= N. D. T. Oliver =

Brazilian cricketer

Norman Dennys Trevor Oliver CavA (1886–1948) played cricket for Bedfordshire and Brazil. He was an accomplished all rounder.

== Life ==
Oliver was born in India in 1886, the son of Norman Robert Dicy Oliver of the Indian Civil Service. He was educated as a boarder at Bedford Modern School where he excelled at cricket and was considered to be one of the best all rounders the school had produced.

Oliver played cricket for Bedfordshire in 1902, 1903 and 1912. At the outbreak of World War I, he served with the Royal Field Artillery where he was mentioned in despatches and in 1918 was made a Knight of the Order of Aviz. In 1920 he attained the rank of Captain.

After the war Oliver became an Official of the São Paulo Railway Company. He played cricket for Brazil against Argentina in 1921, 1922 and 1929. On his first appearance of a two-day match at the Hurlingham Cricket Club in Buenos Aires he took one wicket on five overs and scored 19 runs; in the second innings he was not out for 12. A week later at the Buenos Aires Cricket Club Ground he took a wicket in the first innings. In his final match for Brazil in May 1929, he scored 42 runs and took one wicket.

On 8 September 1923, Oliver married Sylvia Broad at Cobham, Surrey. He died in São Paulo, Brazil on 4 April 1948 and was survived by his wife, a son and daughter.
