= Sport in Brazil =

Sports in Brazil are those that are widely practiced and popular in the country, as well as others which originated there or have some cultural significance. Brazilians are heavily involved in sports. Football is the most popular sport in Brazil. Other than football, sports like volleyball, basketball, Brazilian jiu-jitsu, mixed martial arts, tennis, and motor sports, especially Formula One, enjoy high levels of popularity.

== Sports ==
=== Football ===
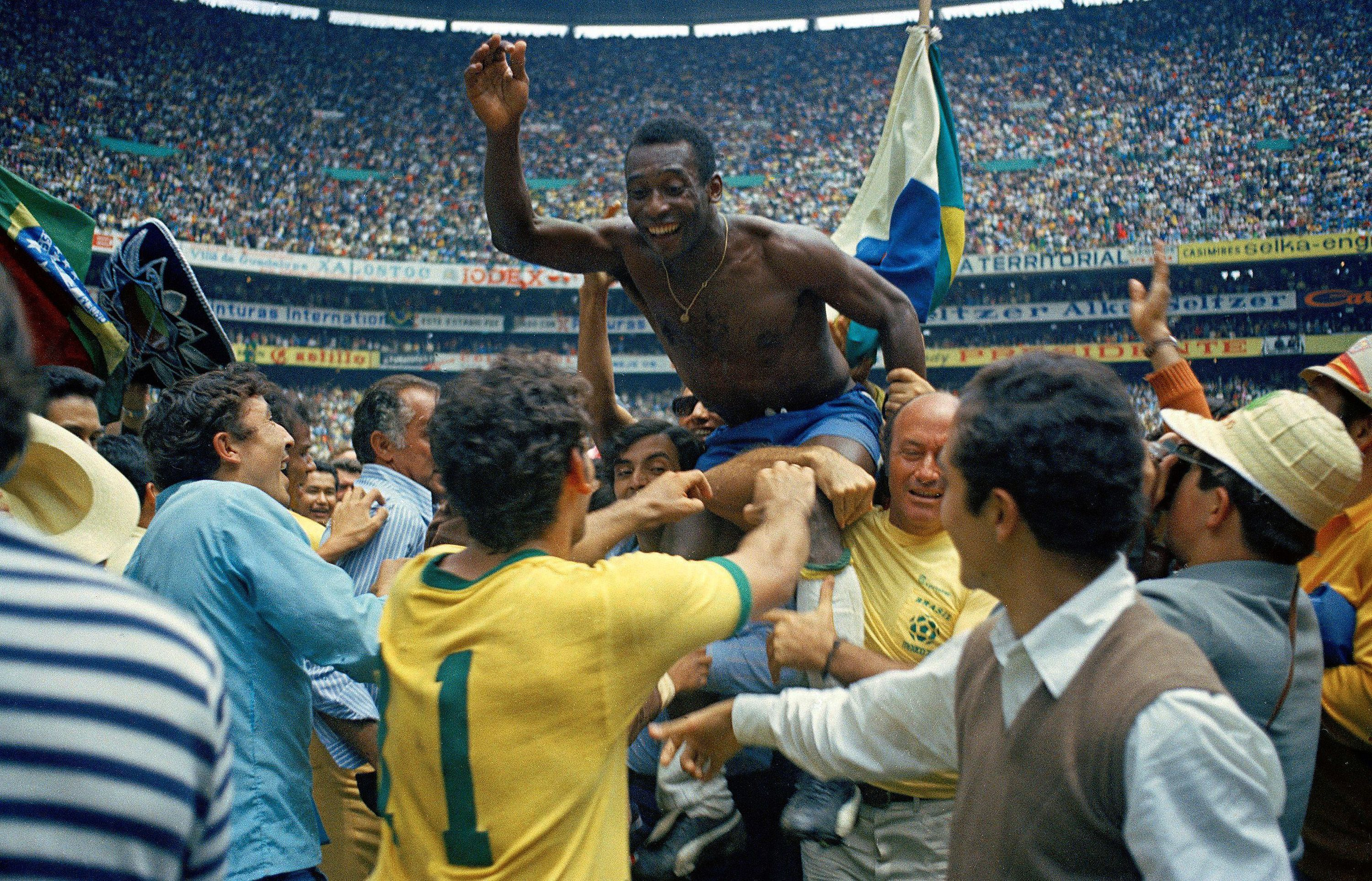
Pelé celebrating the victory of Brazil in the FIFA World Cup.

Football is the most popular sport in Brazil. The Brazil national football team, governed by the Confederação Brasileira de Futebol, has won the FIFA World Cup a record 5 times, in 1958, 1962, 1970, 1994, and 2002, and is the only team to succeed in qualifying for every FIFA World Cup competition ever held. Brazil also hosted the 1950 and 2014 World Cups, becoming the only country in South America to have hosted two World Cups (Argentina, Uruguay, and Chile being the other former hosts). It is among the favorites to win the trophy every time the competition is scheduled. After Brazil won its third World Cup in 1970, they were awarded the Jules Rimet Trophy, when Pelé, one of the most recognized football players in history and all-time top scorer in the sport, led Brazil to three of those championships. The national football team has also won the Copa América 9 times, the Olympic football tournament twice and is the most successful team in the FIFA Confederations Cup, with 4 titles. All of the leading players in the national teams are prominent in the football world, including Pelé, Zico, Garrincha, Ronaldo, Roberto Carlos, Romário, Ronaldinho, Taffarel, Falcão, Rivaldo and Neymar in the men's game, and Marta in the women's game. Some of these players can be considered super-stars, achieving celebrity status internationally and signing multi-million club contracts, as well as advertisement and endorsement deals.

=== Football variations: futsal, beach football, footvolley ===
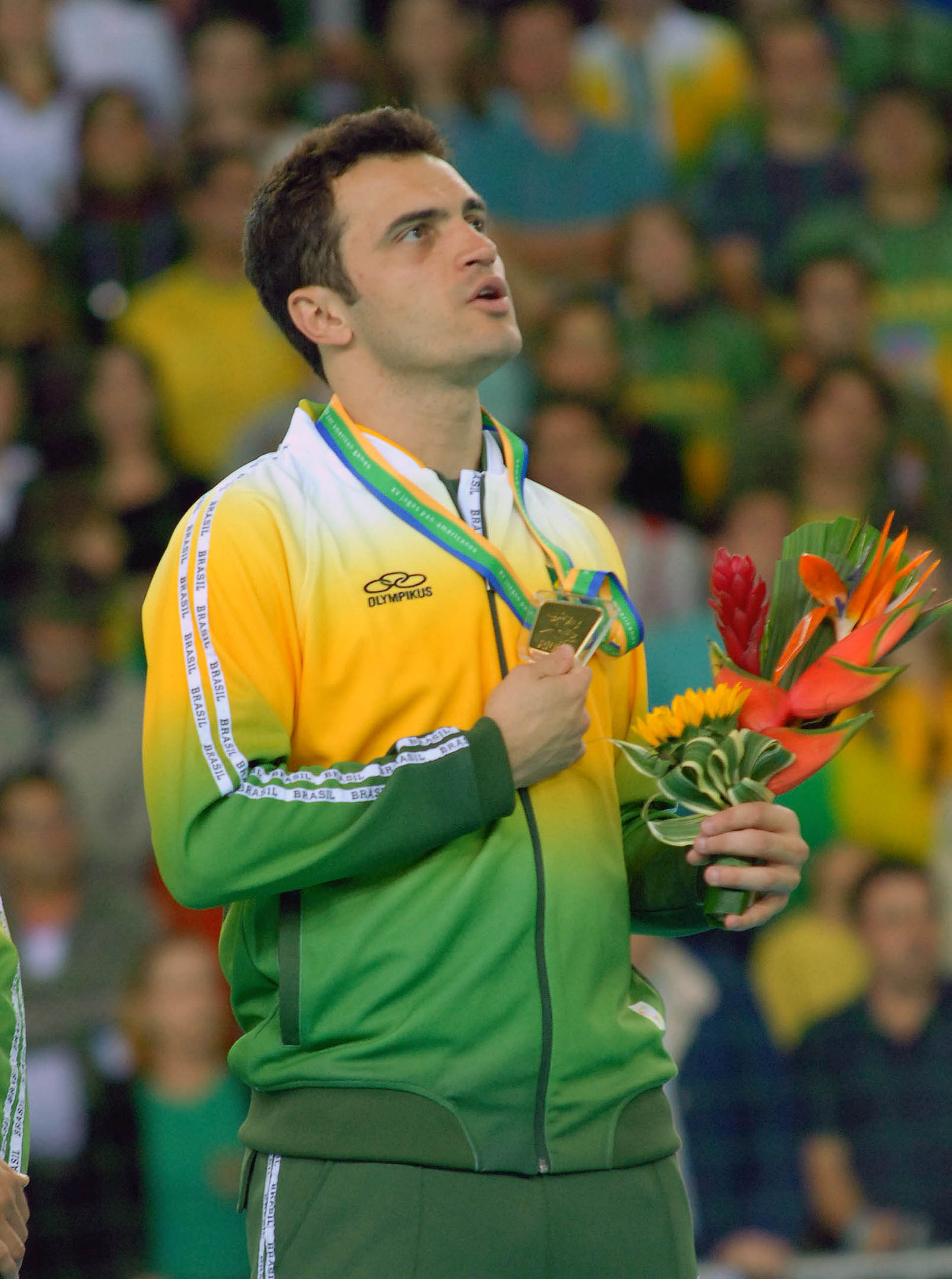
Falcão.

Brazil invented some variations of football, such as beach soccer and footvolley. Futsal, having been invented in Uruguay, neighboring Brazil, is also widely practiced in the country, mainly in the state of Rio Grande do Sul, neighboring Uruguay.

In futsal, Brazil is one of the greatest world powers. Before the Fifa Era, there were three World Cups, organized by the former International Federation of Indoor Soccer (Fifusa), where Brazil was world champion twice. Brazil is the biggest champion of the FIFA Futsal World Cup, with 6 titles. Falcão is the most renowned male Brazilian player.

In beach soccer, Brazil is among the world's greatest powers, being the biggest champion of the FIFA Beach Soccer World Cup, with 6 titles. In addition, it has nine world titles from the former competition organized by Beach Soccer Worldwide (BSWW), the Beach Soccer World Championships.

Footvolley is a recreational sport widely practiced on Brazilian beaches, mainly in Rio de Janeiro, where it was invented. It was created by Octavio de Moraes in the 1970s. It is a mix of football and volleyball, where the players must use their feet and head to get the ball over the net and into the opponent's side, and is played on the beaches. It is one of the most popular beach sports in Brazil. Footvolley started out with 5 players on each team but later got cut to 2 players on each team and is still so to this day.

=== Capoeira ===
Capoeira is an Afro-Brazilian martial art that combines elements of dance and music, and is marked by deft, tricky movements that are often played on the ground or completely inverted. It also has a strong acrobatic component in some versions and is always played with music. It is a culturally significant sport, developed in colonial times by slaves. Nowadays, capoeira is practiced internationally and found its way into popular culture, through many computer games and movies.

=== Brazilian jiu-jitsu, vale tudo, and mixed martial arts ===
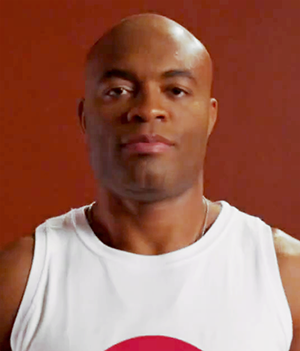
Anderson Silva.

Mixed martial arts is one of the most popular sports in Brazil. It is considered to be only behind football in terms of national popularity.

Brazilian jiu-jitsu originated in Brazil in the 1910s, and emphasizes ground fighting techniques and submission holds involving joint-locks and chokeholds. Hélio Gracie had a rather small build and changed jiu-jitsu (originating from Japan) to be used by anyone in a real fight situation. The belt progression system goes in the following order: White, Blue, Purple, Brown, Black, Red-black, and Red. Gracie Jiu Jitsu became known internationally in the 1990s, due to the very skilled fighters in the Gracie family, namely Hélio Gracie, Royce Gracie, and Rickson Gracie, which are also responsible for spreading the practice of vale tudo, meaning "anything goes", which evolved into mixed martial arts tournaments such as PRIDE, DREAM, and the Ultimate Fighting Championship. Many Brazilian fighters have become significant figures in various mixed martial art tournaments abroad, some notable Brazilian fighters in these tournaments include Anderson Silva, Wanderlei Silva, Antônio Rodrigo Nogueira, Vitor Belfort, Mauricio Rua, José Aldo, Charles Oliveira, Murilo Bustamante, Junior dos Santos, Rafael dos Anjos, Fabricio Werdum, Lyoto Machida, Alex Pereira and Amanda Nunes.

=== Volleyball ===
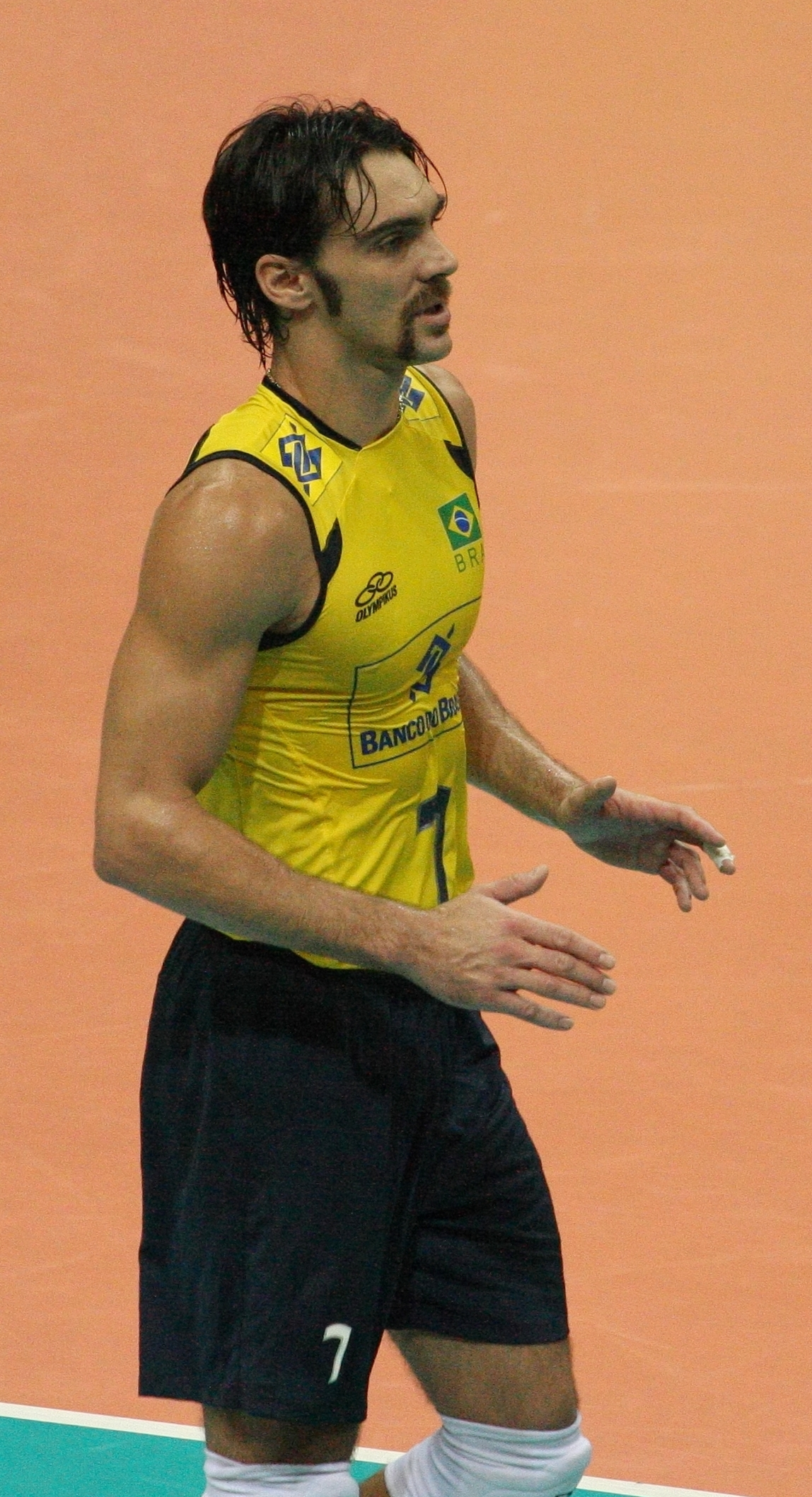
Giba is the most popular volleyball player of Brazil.

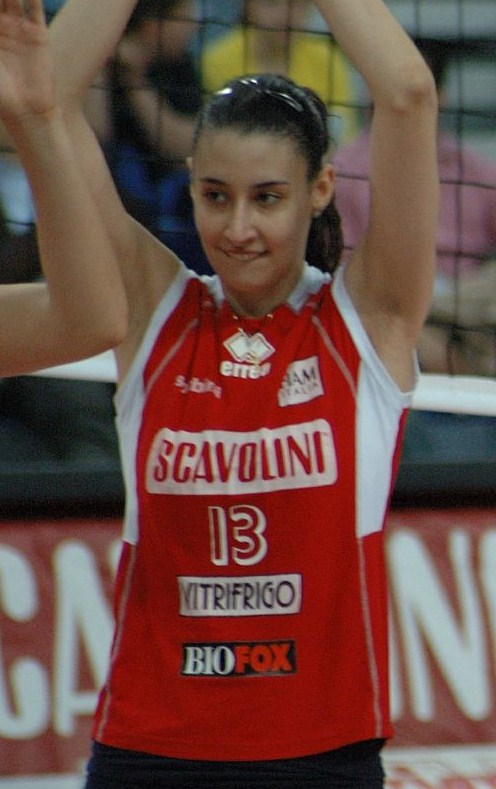
Sheilla is considered one of the greatest players in the country's history.

Brazil is the most successful country in volleyball and it is Brazil's second most popular sport.

The Brazil men's national volleyball team is currently the champion in 3 competitions, the Volleyball World Cup, the Volleyball World Championship and the Olympic Volleyball Tournament, and is ranked number 1 in the FIVB World Rankings

The Brazil women's national volleyball team is ranked number 4 in the FIVB World Rankings.

Brazil has professional volleyball team competitions: the Superliga Masculina de Vôlei and its female counterpart, Superliga Feminina de Vôlei. Among the most successful teams are Minas, Banespa, and Santo André for the male league, and Rexona, Osasco, and Flamengo for the female league.

Brazilian younger teams maintain the same success rate as the senior squads. As of March 25, 2007, in the FIVB men ranking for junior and youth, Brazil is placed first for women, while the men are placed second.

==== Men's national volleyball team achievements ====
Olympics

Gold (1992, 2004, 2016)
Silver (1984, 2008, 2012)

World Championship

Gold (2002, 2006, 2010)
Silver (1982, 2014, 2018)
Bronze (2022)

World Cup

Gold (2003, 2007, 2019)

FIVB World League

Gold (1993, 2001, 2003, 2004, 2005, 2006, 2007, 2009, 2010)

FIVB Volleyball Men's Nations League

Gold (2021)

Volleyball Grand Champions Cup

Gold (1997, 2005, 2009, 2013, 2017)

==== Women's national volleyball team achievements ====
Olympics

Gold (2008, 2012)
Silver (2020)
Bronze (1996, 2000, 2024)

World Championship

Silver (1994, 2006, 2010, 2022)
Bronze (2014)

FIVB World Grand Prix

Gold (1994, 1996, 1998, 2004, 2005, 2006, 2008, 2009, 2013, 2014, 2017)

FIVB Volleyball Women's Nations League

Silver (2019, 2021, 2022)

Volleyball Grand Champions Cup

Gold (2005, 2013)

=== Beach volleyball ===
Brazil is one of the strongest countries in the world in beach volleyball, a sport widely practiced in the country due to its long coastline, mainly in Rio de Janeiro, on the coast of Santa Catarina, and in the Northeast Region of the country. Until the 2024 Olympic Games, the country had 2 golds, 3 silvers and 1 bronze in the men's modality, and 2 golds, 4 silvers and 2 bronzes in the women's modality. In world championships, Brazil has already won numerous titles.

=== Basketball ===
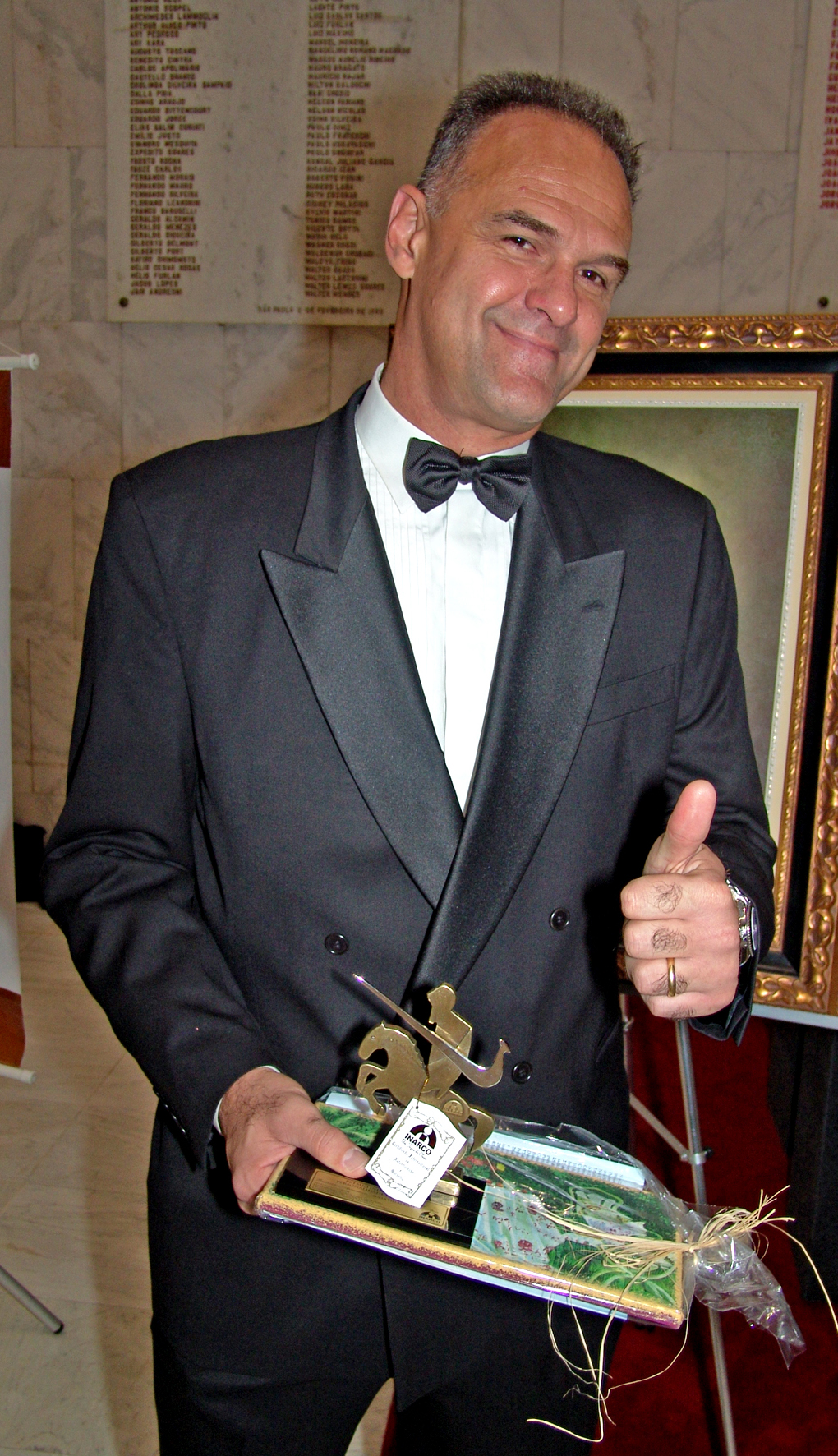
Oscar Schmidt.

Basketball is the third most popular sport in Brazil. The Brazil men's national basketball team won three Olympic bronze medals, in 1948, 1960 and 1964, and has won the Basketball World Championship twice, in 1959 and 1963. They have also been runners-up on two occasions in 1954 and 1970, as well as coming third on two occasions in 1967 and 1978, meaning that the Brazilian national basketball team has won in total six medals at the Basketball World Championship. The Brazilian national basketball team has also won a total of nine medals at the FIBA Americas Championship, three gold (1984, 2005, 2009) two silver (1988, 2001), and four bronze (1989, 1992, 1995, 1997). The Brazil women's national basketball team was Olympic runner-up in 1996 and bronze medalist in 2000, in addition to being world champion in 1994 and bronze in 1971. Oscar Schmidt is the most renowned male Brazilian player, and Hortência Marcari the most renowned female. Both were inducted to the Naismith Memorial Basketball Hall of Fame and the FIBA Hall of Fame.

The major basketball leagues are called Novo Basquete Brasil – the men's tournament – and Liga de Basquete Feminino – the female tournament. Various famous Brazilian players play in those leagues. In addition, on the men's side, various players are competing in the National Basketball Association and European leagues. A record nine Brazilians were on NBA rosters at the start of the 2015–16 season—Leandro Barbosa, Bruno Caboclo, Cristiano Felício, Marcelo Huertas, Nenê, Raul Neto, Lucas Nogueira, Tiago Splitter, and Anderson Varejão.

=== Motorsport ===
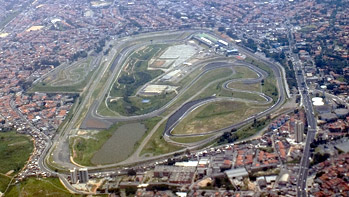
Autódromo José Carlos Pace, venue for the Brazilian Grand Prix.

Brazil has produced three Formula One world champions: Emerson Fittipaldi (1972 and 1974), Nelson Piquet (1981, 1983 and 1987), and Ayrton Senna (1988, 1990 and 1991). In total, Brazilian drivers have won 101 Formula One races (as of the 2024 Abu Dhabi Grand Prix), distributed between Senna (41), Piquet (23), Fittipaldi (14), Felipe Massa (11), Rubens Barrichello (11), and José Carlos Pace (1).

In 1994, Brazil declared three days of national mourning after Senna's death during the 1994 San Marino Grand Prix.

From Emerson Fittipaldi's debut in 1970 to Felipe Massa's retirement in 2017, there were 48 consecutive Formula One seasons with at least one Brazilian driver. As of the 2024 season, Massa is the last Brazilian driver to have competed full-time in Formula One. However, Gabriel Bortoleto is set to join the grid in the 2025 season.

The Brazilian Grand Prix has been on the Formula One calendar since 1972, currently held in October or November. Two circuits have been host to the race: Jacarepagua and Interlagos. The Jacarepagua circuit, located in Rio de Janeiro, hosted the 1978 race, and then between 1981 and 1989. From 1972 to 1977, in 1979 and 1980, and from 1990 to the present, the Grand Prix has been held at the Interlagos circuit in São Paulo.

One Formula One team has been based in Brazil: Fittipaldi Automotive, owned by Emerson Fittipaldi and his brother Wilson. The team competed from 1974 to 1982.

Brazil has produced several notable drivers in American open-wheel car racing, some of whom also competed in Formula One. Emerson Fittipaldi was the 1989 CART champion, Gil de Ferran was the 2000 CART and 2001 CART champion, Cristiano da Matta was the 2002 CART champion and the Tony Kanaan was 2004 IndyCar Series champion. Brazilian drivers have won the Indianapolis 500, the most prestigious race in American open-wheel racing, eight times: Emerson Fittipaldi in 1989 and 1993; Hélio Castroneves in 2001, 2002, 2009 and 2021; Gil de Ferran in 2003; and Tony Kanaan in 2013. Castroneves is one of only four drivers that have won the Indianapolis 500 four times, and the only one from a country other than the United States. Two American open-wheel races have been held in Brazil: CART hosted the Rio 400 (later the Rio 200) at Jacarepagua from 1996 to 2000, and the IndyCar Series hosted the São Paulo Indy 300 from 2010 to 2013.

In the sports car racing scene, Raul Boesel won the 1987 World Sportscar Championship and got close to winning the 1991 Le Mans 24 Hours, when he was second, and Ricardo Zonta won the 1998 FIA GT Championship. Boesel was part of the winning team at the 1988 Daytona 24 Hours, a race which was also won by fellow Brazilians Christian Fittipaldi (twice, in 2004 and 2014), Oswaldo Negri (2012), Kanaan (2015) and Pipo Derani (2016). Fittipaldi also won the United SportsCar Championship in 2014 and 2015, alongside Portuguese team-mate João Barbosa. Also the Mil Milhas Brasil, an endurance race, has the longest history in the Brazilian racing events.

Nelson Piquet Jr. was the inaugural Formula E champion in 2014-15 and Lucas Di Grassi won 2016-17 with Audi Abt Sportsline .

The popularity of auto racing is rising, with the Stock Car Pro Series and Fórmula Truck being broadcast nationally. The South American Formula Three series was mostly held in Brazil until 2013, and developed several South American circuit drivers. In 2014 it was succeeded by a revived Brazilian Formula Three Championship.

In motorcycle racing, the most prominent Brazilian racer in MotoGP as of now is Alex Barros, who is the most experienced racer of all time in the category, with 276 race starts and seven wins. The Brazilian motorcycle Grand Prix was held four times between 1987 and 1992, followed by the Rio de Janeiro motorcycle Grand Prix which was held nine times between 1995 and 2004.

=== Tennis ===
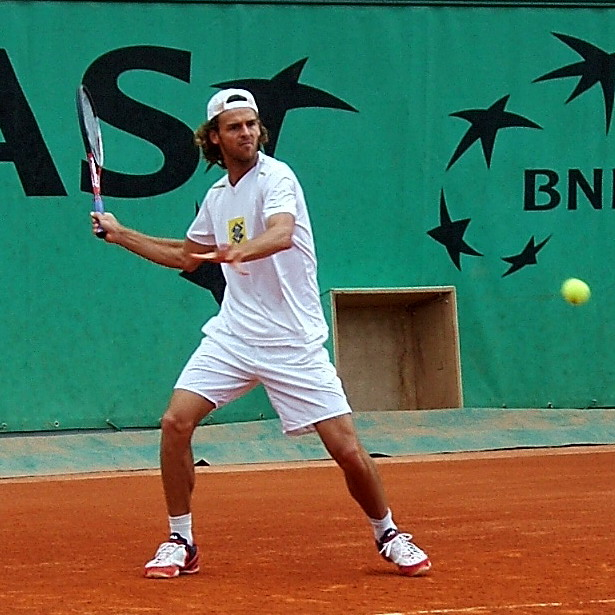
Gustavo Kuerten at the 2005 French Open.

Maria Esther Bueno is the most successful Brazilian tennis player at the Grand Slam tournaments. She won seven single titles (four wins at the US Open and three at Wimbledon) and twelve doubles titles (five at Wimbledon, four at the US Open, two in the Roland Garros, including a mixed doubles title). In the men's game, Gustavo Kuerten is the most successful Brazilian player, with three wins at Roland Garros (1997, 2000, 2001) as well as being ranked number one in the world for almost a full year. However, bad administration and lack of serious support resulted in poor results in the present years and scarcity of national-level competitiveness. Beatriz Haddad Maia is the first Brazilian woman to enter the world's top 20 in the Open Era.

Brazil has also had other historically important players, such as Luiz Mattar, Fernando Meligeni, Thomaz Bellucci and João Fonseca, who were already top 30 in the ATP rankings.

In the country, Doubles has been stronger, especially with Marcelo Melo, Bruno Soares, Luisa Stefani, Rafael Matos and Orlando Luz. Melo has been ranked No. 1 in the ATP Doubles Rankings and Soares has achieved a peak ranking of No. 2. Stefani was the first Brazilian woman to reach the world's top 10 in the Open Era. Melo won his first Grand Slam title in Roland Garros and his second in Wimbledon. He has also reached at least the semifinals of all four Grand Slams, has won 9 Masters 1000 titles and reached the doubles final on the ATP World Tour Finals. In 2009, he reached the mixed doubles final at the French Open with American Vania King, becoming the seventh Brazilian to reach the final of a Grand Slam and the first since Gustavo Kuerten. Soares won the 2016 Australian Open and US Open Men's Doubles with Jamie Murray, 2020 US Open Men's Doubles with Mate Pavić, the US Open Mixed Doubles title in 2012 (with Ekaterina Makarova) and 2014 (with Sania Mirza), and the 2016 Australian Open Mixed Doubles with Elena Vesnina. He also has 4 Masters 1000 titles (a double championship at Canada's Masters 1000 in 2013 and 2014, the Cincinnati Masters 1000 in 2018 and the Shanghai Masters 1000 in 2019).

=== Swimming ===
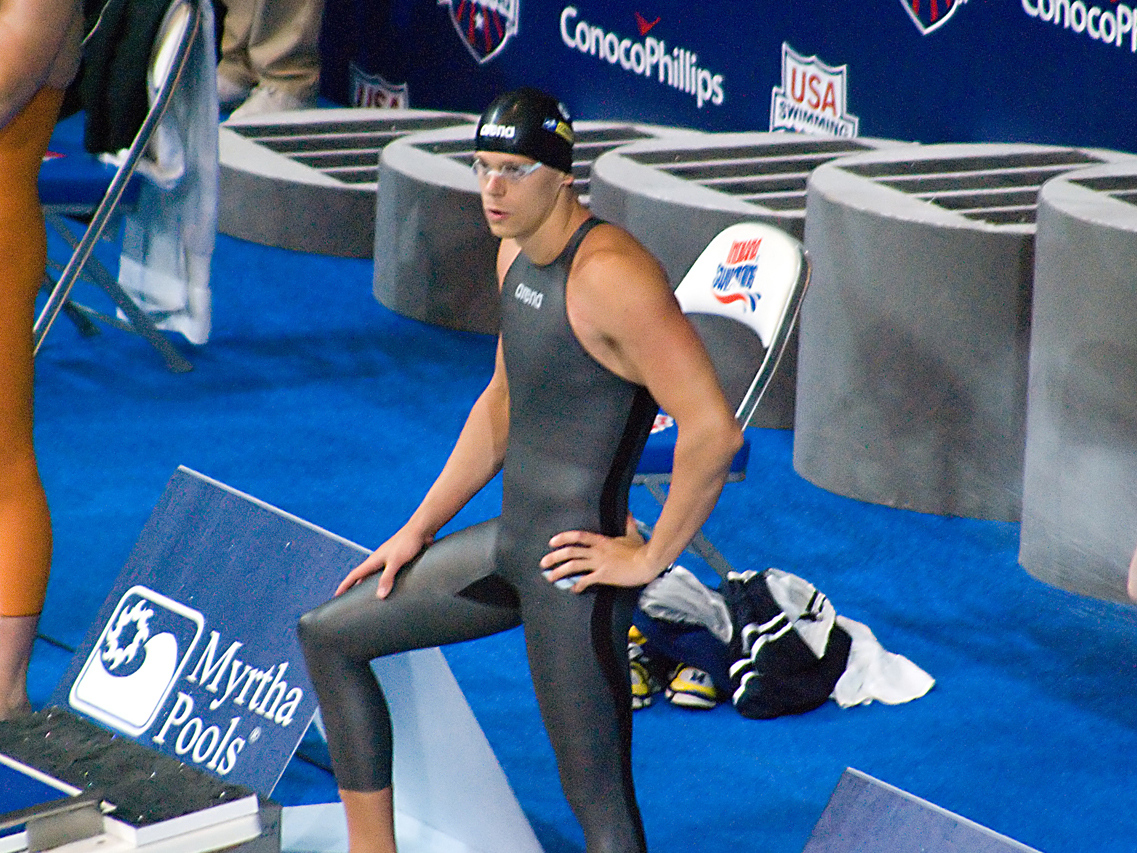
Cielo at the 2009 US National Championships in Indianapolis.

Swimming is very popular in Brazil. Being a sport usually recommended for children, and suitable for a country with a tropical climate like Brazil, swimming has grown and started to produce important sporting icons. Although the country had some success with swimmers like Piedade Coutinho, Tetsuo Okamoto, Manuel dos Santos and José Fiolo, the sport started to become more popular with Djan Madruga, Rômulo Arantes and Ricardo Prado in 1970s and 1980s; going through Gustavo Borges and Fernando Scherer in the 1990s, Brazilian swimming today manufactures great talents in succession.

In the 21st century, Brazil's swimming program was led by César Cielo, an Olympic and world champion who held world records in the 50-meter and 100-meter freestyle events. The country has produced several other Olympic medalists, including Thiago Pereira, Bruno Fratus and Fernando Scheffer, as well as athletes who have set world records or won World Championship medals, such as Felipe França, Kaio de Almeida, Nicholas Santos, João Gomes Júnior, Felipe Lima and Guilherme Costa. In women's swimming, Brazilian competitors have earned international podiums through athletes such as Etiene Medeiros, Poliana Okimoto, and Olympic champion Ana Marcela Cunha. With the increasing emergence of talents, swimming has been standing out and conquering its space.

Beyond individual athletes, Brazil has hosted the 1995 FINA World Swimming Championships (25 m) and, as a team, won the 2014 FINA World Swimming Championships (25 m).

=== Athletics ===
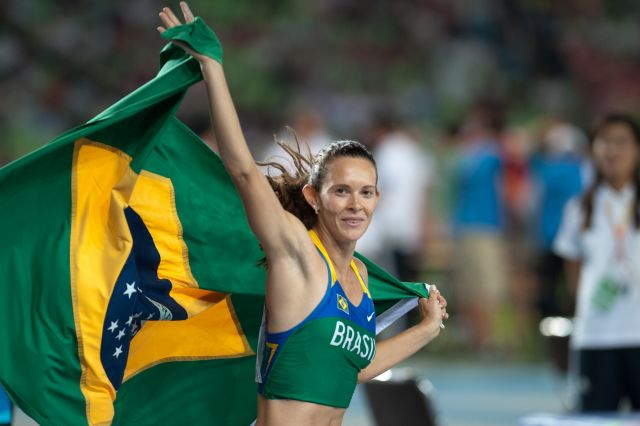
Fabiana Murer in 2011.

Athletics is a traditional sport in Brazil, winning Olympic medals for the country. In athletics, the best known athletes are Adhemar Ferreira da Silva, João Carlos de Oliveira, Joaquim Cruz, Robson Caetano, Maurren Maggi and Fabiana Murer. Other important athletes in the history of Brazil are: Thiago Braz, Alison dos Santos, Nélson Prudêncio, Jadel Gregório, Zequinha Barbosa, Sanderlei Parrela, Claudinei Quirino, Vicente de Lima, André Domingos, Édson Ribeiro, Vanderlei Cordeiro de Lima, Caio Bonfim, Rosângela Santos, Letícia Oro Melo, Mauro Vinícius da Silva and Darlan Romani.

In Brazil, athletics tends to lose many practitioners to football, which grants better salaries to its athletes. It's one of the reasons why the country has less global prominence in events such as the 100 metres. The sport is usually concentrated in some clubs specializing in athletics, and also receives attention and support from the country's Armed Forces. Brazil has a tradition in events such as triple jump and hosts important long-distance running events, such as Saint Silvester Road Race.

=== Judo ===
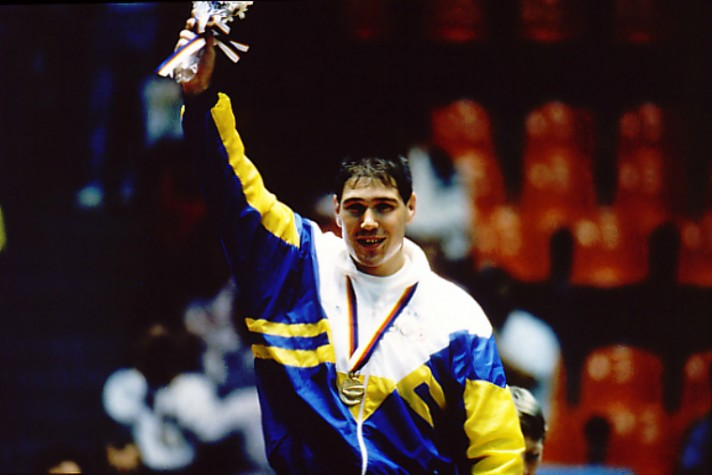
Aurélio Miguel.

Judo is another sport usually recommended for children in Brazil, and therefore it is widely practiced. The country has a growing international tradition in the sport, constantly winning medals and titles. The sport was brought and developed by its large Japanese community. The greatest exponents of the sport until today were Aurélio Miguel, Sarah Menezes, Rogério Sampaio, and Rafaela Silva, Olympic champions. Brazil also had several other important judo athletes, such as the Olympic runners-up Douglas Vieira, Tiago Camilo, Carlos Honorato, Willian Lima, and the Olympic bronze medalists Chiaki Ishii, Luiz Onmura, Walter Carmona, Henrique Guimarães, Leandro Guilheiro, Flávio Canto, Ketleyn Quadros, Felipe Kitadai, Mayra Aguiar, Daniel Cargnin, Rafael Silva and Larissa Pimenta. Brazil also had world champion judokas, such as João Derly, who forced changes to the rules of world judo due to their dominance.

=== Handball ===
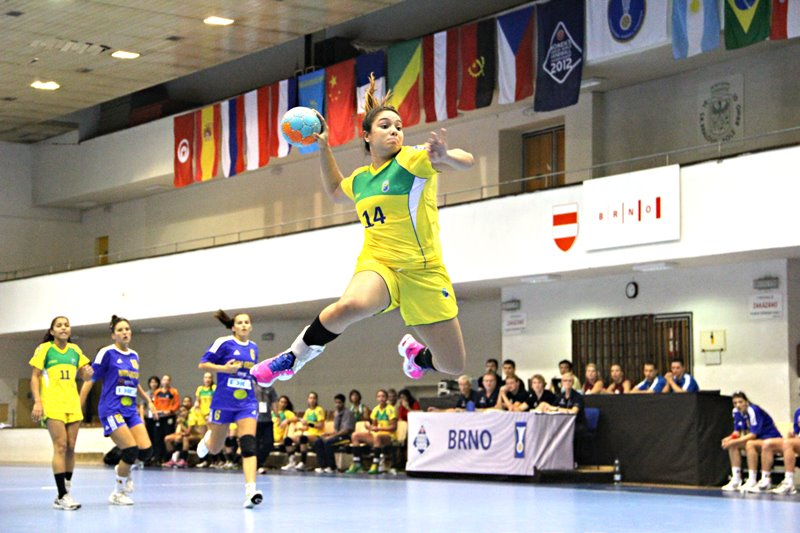
Deborah Pontes.

Handball is a sport that came with German immigrants, which is very popular in schools around the world. It's the second most practiced sport in schools in Brazil, second only to football / futsal. The Brazil women's national handball team is, in terms of results, the best handball team in the Americas. At the 2013 World Women's Handball Championship, they were crowned champions, defeating the host team 22–20. They also finished fifth at the 2016 Olympics. The Brazil men's national handball team has as its great feat having finished in 7th place in the 2025 World Men's Handball Championship, defeating European powerhouses of the sport and being eliminated only by the eventual champion of the tournament, in addition to also having finished in 7th place in the 2016 Summer Olympics.

=== Beach handball ===
At the Beach Handball World Championships Brazil has more titles for both genders than any country.

=== Boxing ===
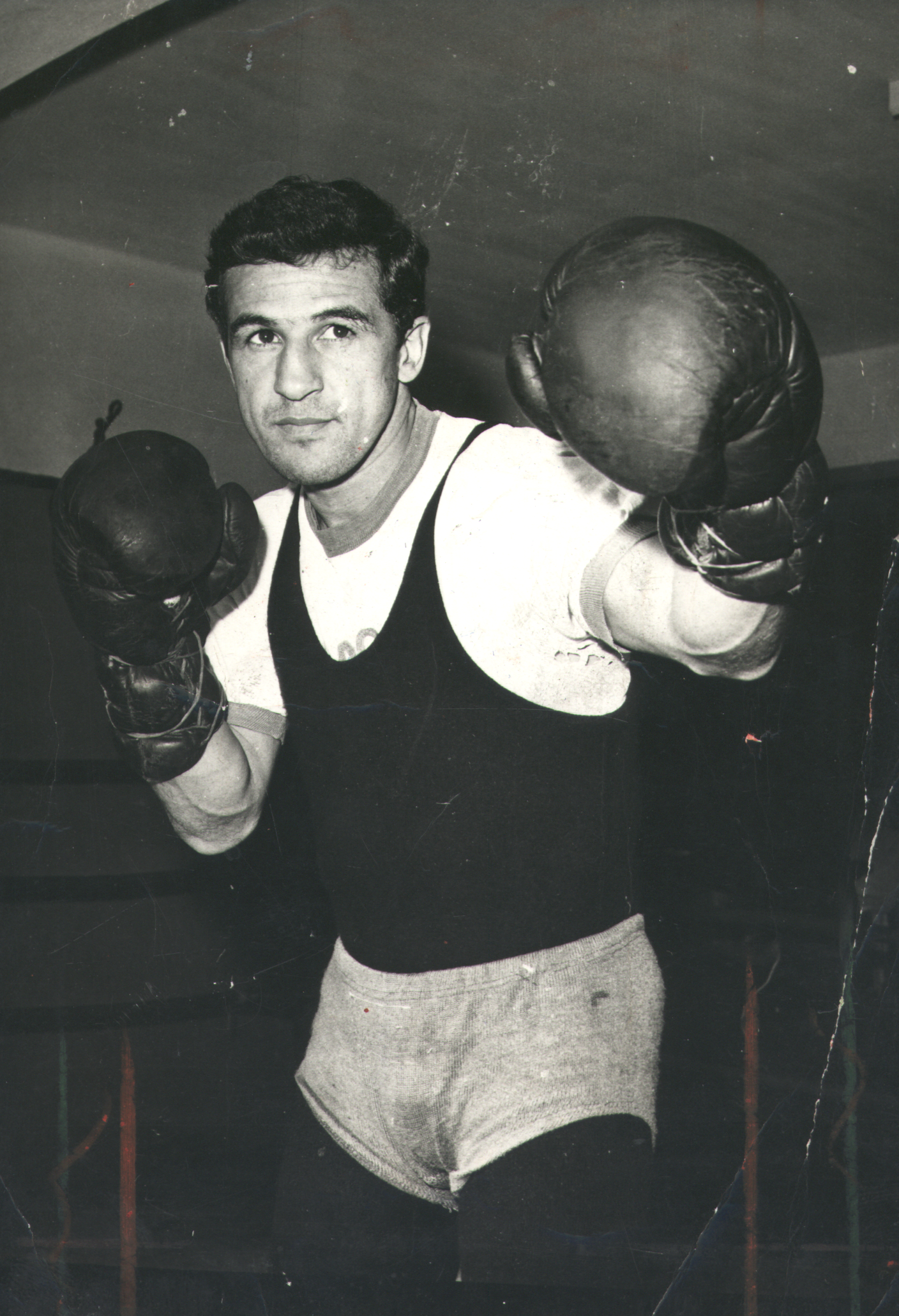
Éder Jofre, former world champion.

Boxing is another popular sport, especially in Northeast Brazil; it's considered a sport of the working class. Eder Jofre, Acelino Freitas, Maguila, Miguel de Oliveira, Valdemir Pereira, Rose Volante and Patrick Teixeira are former world champions. In the Olympics, Brazil won the gold medal in the category of up to 60 kg with the fighter Robson Conceição, being the first Olympic gold in Brazilian boxing. Hebert Conceição was also an Olympic champion. Other Olympic medalists in Brazil were Servílio de Oliveira, Yamaguchi Falcão, Esquiva Falcão, Abner Teixeira, Adriana Araújo and Beatriz Ferreira. Another famous boxer in Brazil was Maguila, a heavyweight who came to face Evander Holyfield and George Foreman.

=== Skateboarding ===
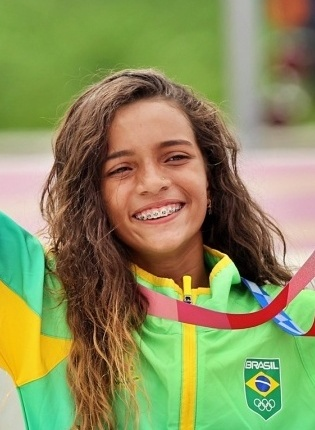
Rayssa Leal.

Skateboarding is a popular sport in Brazil. According to a study of 2019, the estimated number of skateboarders in Brazil was close to 8.5 million (the majority in the state of São Paulo). Many of the world's top skateboarders are Brazilian, including Bob Burnquist, Sandro Dias, Lincoln Ueda, Rodrigo Menezes, Luan de Oliveira, Felipe Gustavo, Rodil Ferrugem, Nilton Neves, Fabrizio Santos, Alex Carolino, Christiano Mateus, Karen Jones, Ricardo Porva, Daniel Vieira, and Og de Souza. Fabiola da Silva is well known for aggressive inline skating.

With the rise of skateboarding to the category of Olympic sport in 2020, Rayssa Leal became famous for her silver medal obtained at the age of 13. Pedro Barros, Kelvin Hoefler and Augusto Akio also won Olympic medals. Other famous skaters like Pâmela Rosa and Letícia Bufoni also stand out.

=== Surfing ===
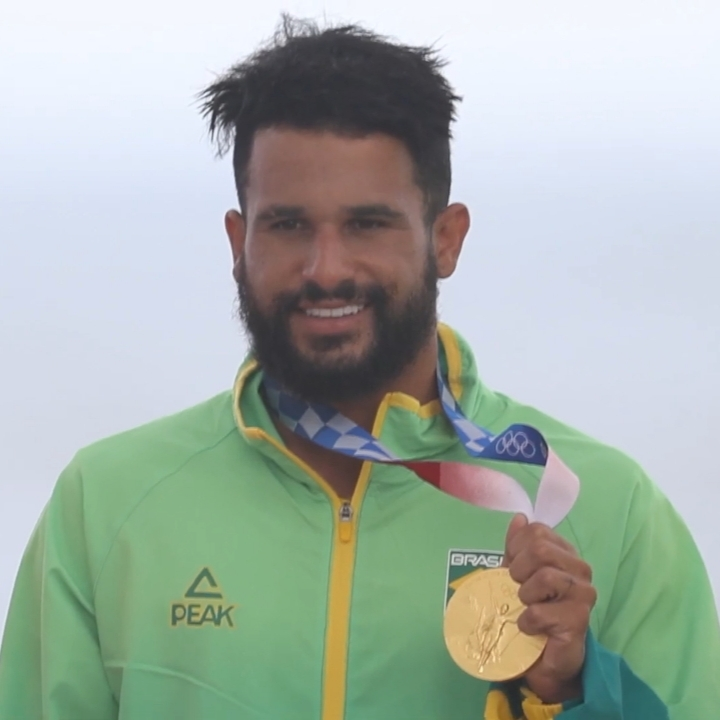
Ítalo Ferreira.

Surfing is one of the most popular aquatic sports in Brazil, with several professional Brazilian surfers competing in the men's and women's ASP World Tour, including former world champions Gabriel Medina and Adriano de Souza. Brazil is known for producing longboard surfers (such as former world champion Phil Razjman), big-rider surfers (such as Carlos Burle and two-time XXL award winner Maya Gabeira) and well-known bodyboarders.

Brazilian surfing has progressively evolved to become one of the biggest forces in the sport in the world. Fábio Gouveia reached number 5 in the world in 1992. In the 2010s, the Brazilian Storm appears, with several Brazilians getting closer and closer to the world title, until Gabriel Medina conquers the same in 2014 and Adriano de Souza wins in 2015. In 2020 surfing ascends to the category of Olympic sport and Ítalo Ferreira becomes Olympic champion. Filipe Toledo was also world champion, in 2022 and 2023.

=== Yachting and Equestrianism ===
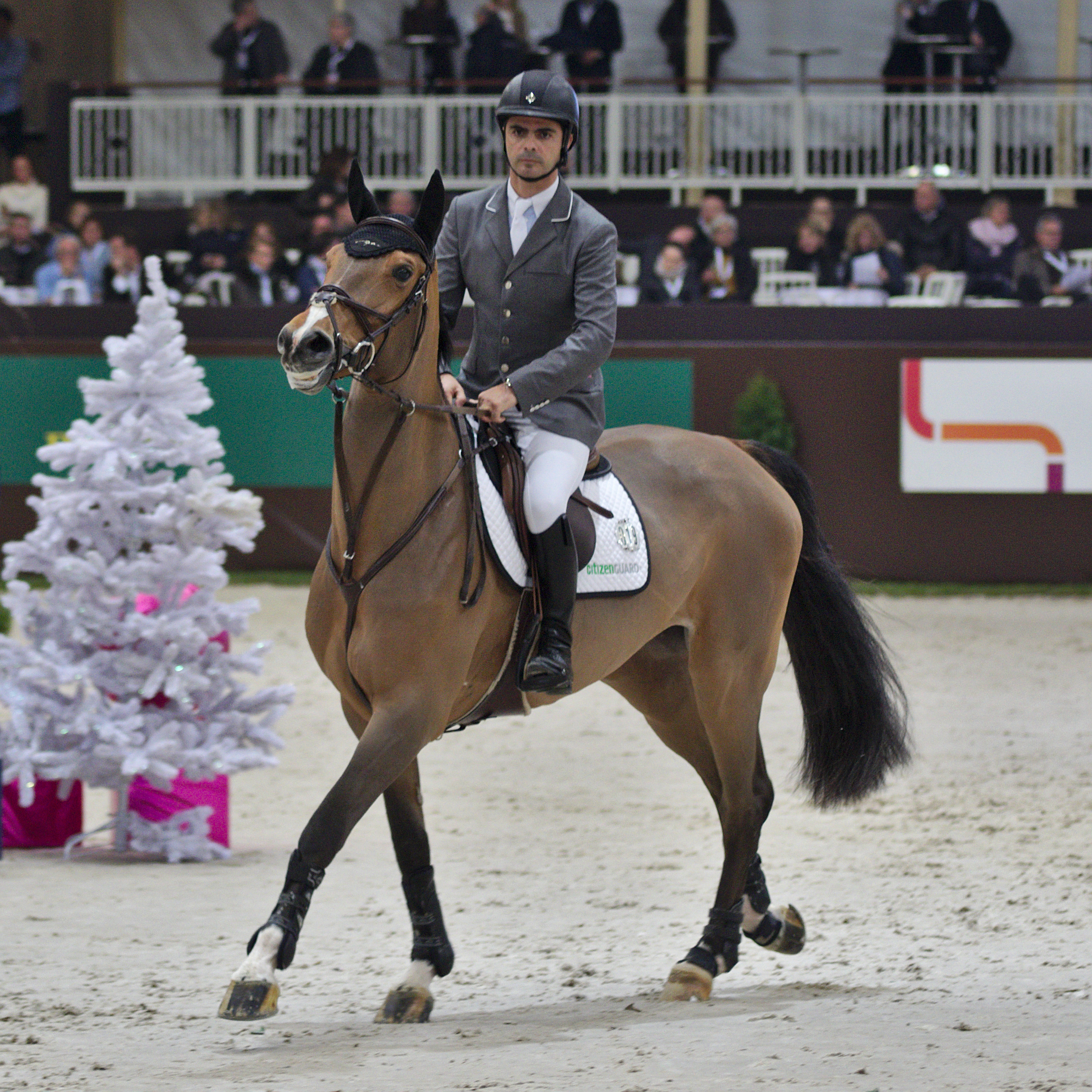
Rodrigo Pessoa.

Despite yachting and equestrianism being inaccessible sports for the general population, Brazil has a great tradition in yachting, and, to a lesser extent, but no less important, tradition in equestrianism. The biggest center for these sports in Brazil is Rio de Janeiro and its neighboring city Niterói. Several Olympic medalists in yachting have trained in Guanabara Bay, such as Martine Grael, Clinio Freitas, Daniel Adler, Eduardo Penido, Isabel Swan, Kiko Pellicano, Marcelo Ferreira, Marcos Soares, Nelson Falcão and Ronaldo Senfft. The country also has olympic medalists from São Paulo Robert Scheidt, Torben Grael, Kahena Kunze, Reinaldo Conrad, Alexandre Welter, Bruno Prada and Peter Ficker. In equestrianism, the Gávea Hippodrome trained athletes such as Rodrigo Pessoa and his father Nelson Pessoa, as well as Luiz Felipe de Azevedo; the country also has olympic medalists from São Paulo Álvaro de Miranda Neto and from Rio Grande do Sul André Johannpeter.

=== Chess ===
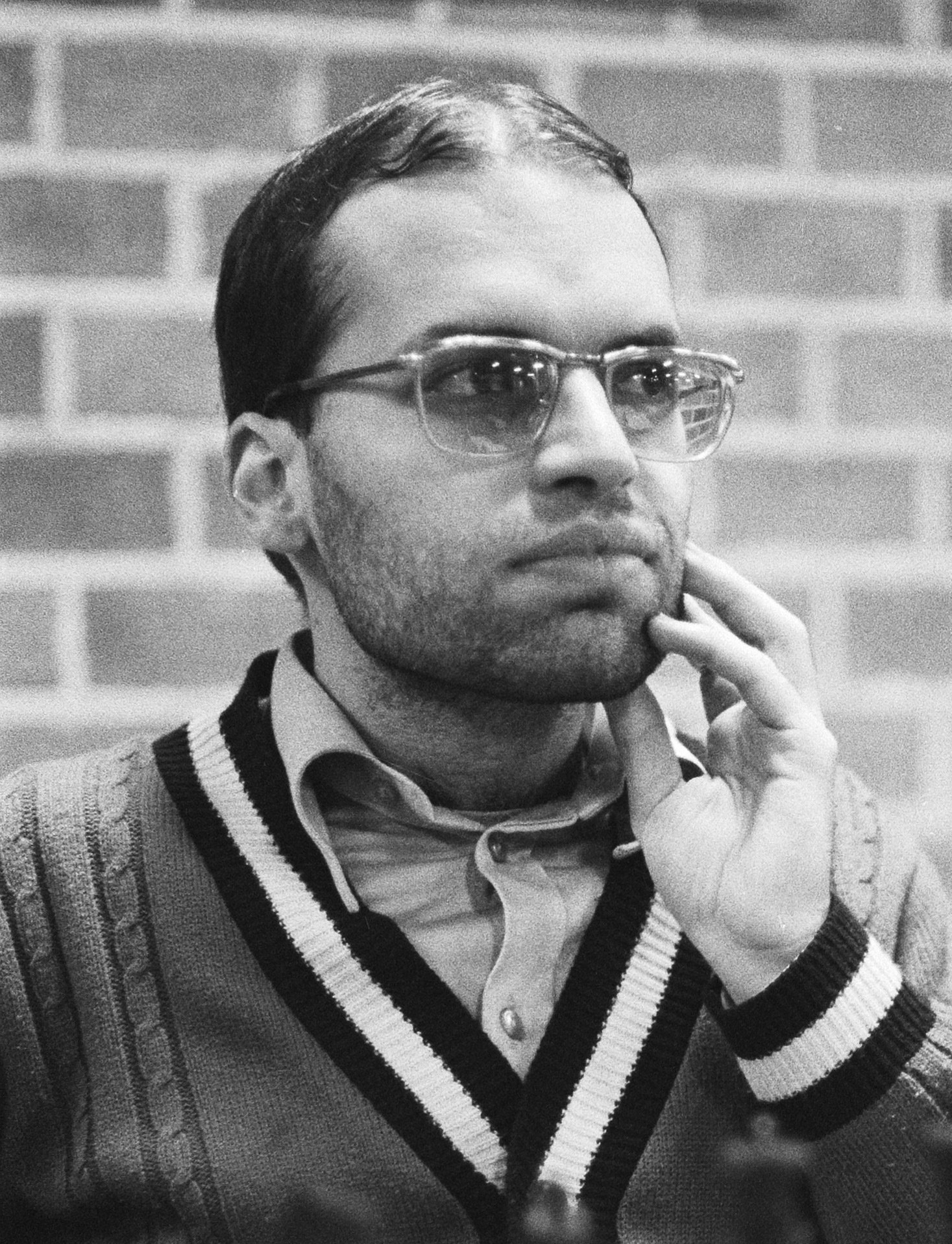
Henrique Mecking

Chess is a sport with many fans in Brazil. Henrique Mecking, known as Mequinho, is considered the most important Brazilian chess player, having reached his peak in 1977, when he was considered the third best player in the world, surpassed only by Anatoly Karpov and Viktor Korchnoi. More recently, in an online blitz game played in May 2020, Luis Paulo Supi defeated reigning World Champion Magnus Carlsen in 18 moves after sacrificing his own Queen. In April 2021, Chess.com awarded that game the first spot in their Chess.com Immortal Game Contest.

=== Table tennis ===
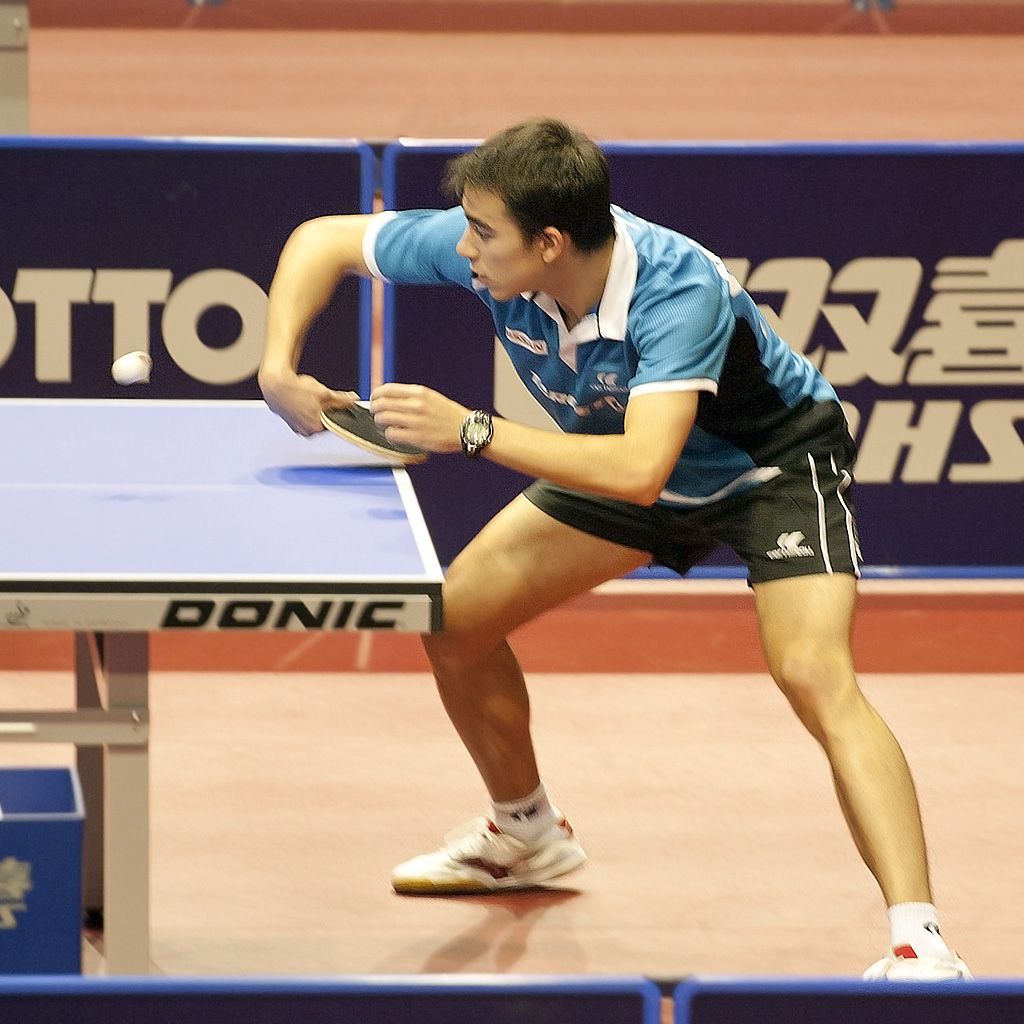
Hugo Calderano.

Table tennis is very popular and widely played in Brazil, and the country has a considerable tradition in this sport. The greatest player in the history of the country is Hugo Calderano, who reached number 2 in the world in 2026 (becoming the greatest Americas player of all time), and was the first male table tennis player from the Americas to win the Table Tennis World Cup, reach the final of the World Table Tennis Championships and reach the semi-finals of the Olympic Games. Other historically important players in the country are Gustavo Tsuboi, Cláudio Kano, Hugo Hoyama, Biriba, Cazuo Matsumoto, Thiago Monteiro and Bruna Takahashi.

=== Taekwondo ===
In taekwondo, Brazilian Natália Falavigna was a bronze medalist at the Olympic Games in 2008 and 4th place in 2004. Maicon Siqueira won bronze in 2016. Diogo Silva finished 4th in 2004 and 2012, Milena Titoneli finished 4th in 2020, and Edival Pontes was a bronze medalist at the Olympic Games in 2024.

==== Karate ====
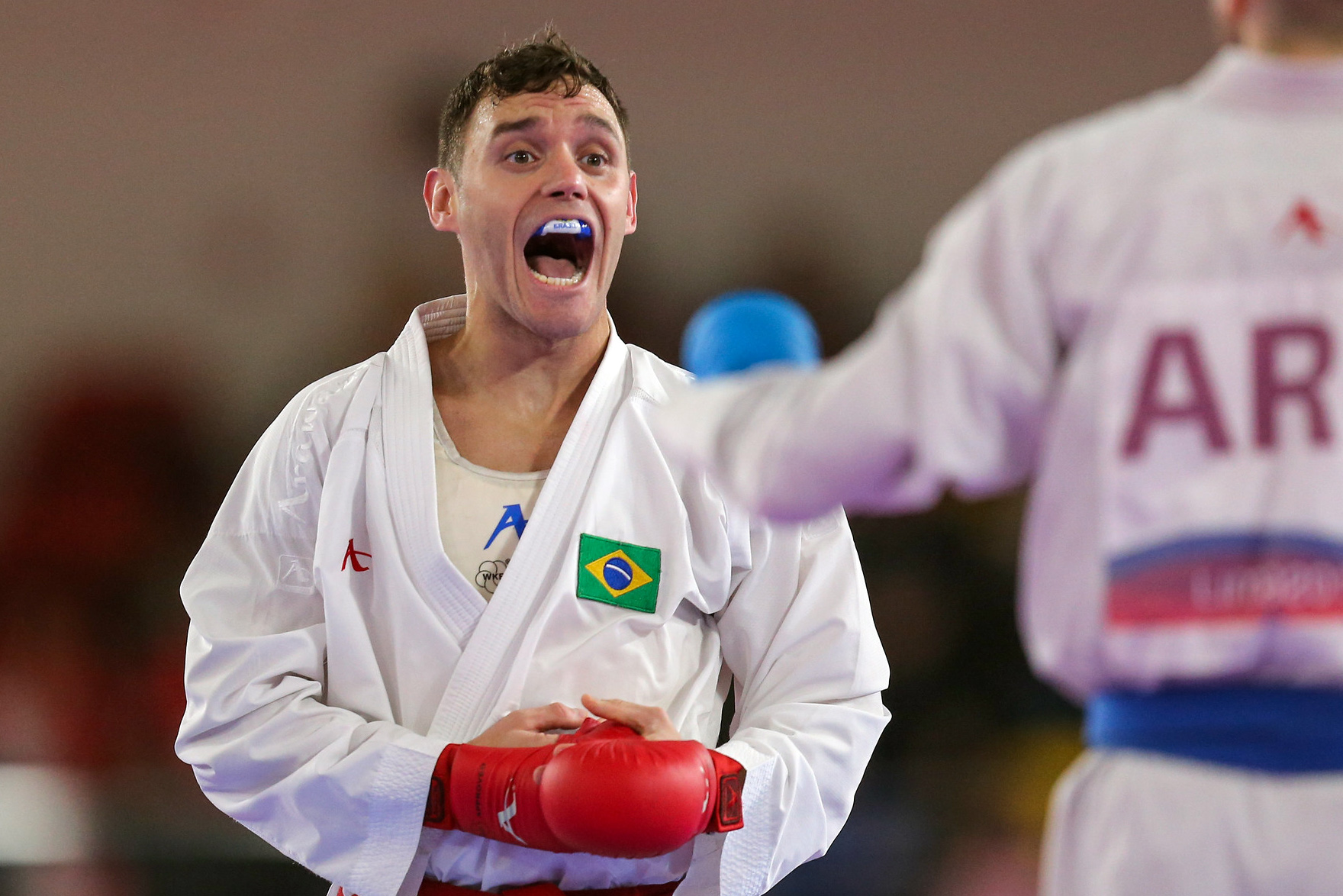
Douglas Brose.

In 2017, Karate had around 250 thousand registered practitioners in Brazil, and at the time, it was the 4th country with the most registered practitioners in the world, in the ranking of the International Karate Federation. In 2019, it was estimated that around 1 million people practiced this sport in the country. Douglas Brose is the biggest name in the history of the sport in Brazil, having been a three-time world champion.

=== Gymnastics ===
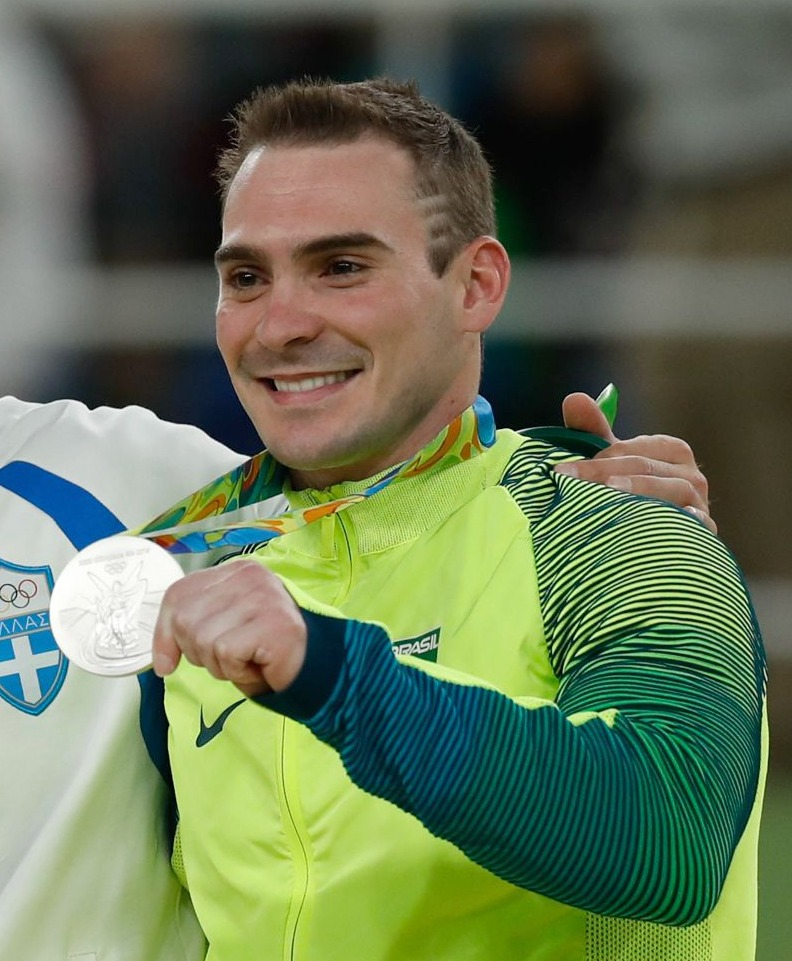
Arthur Zanetti.

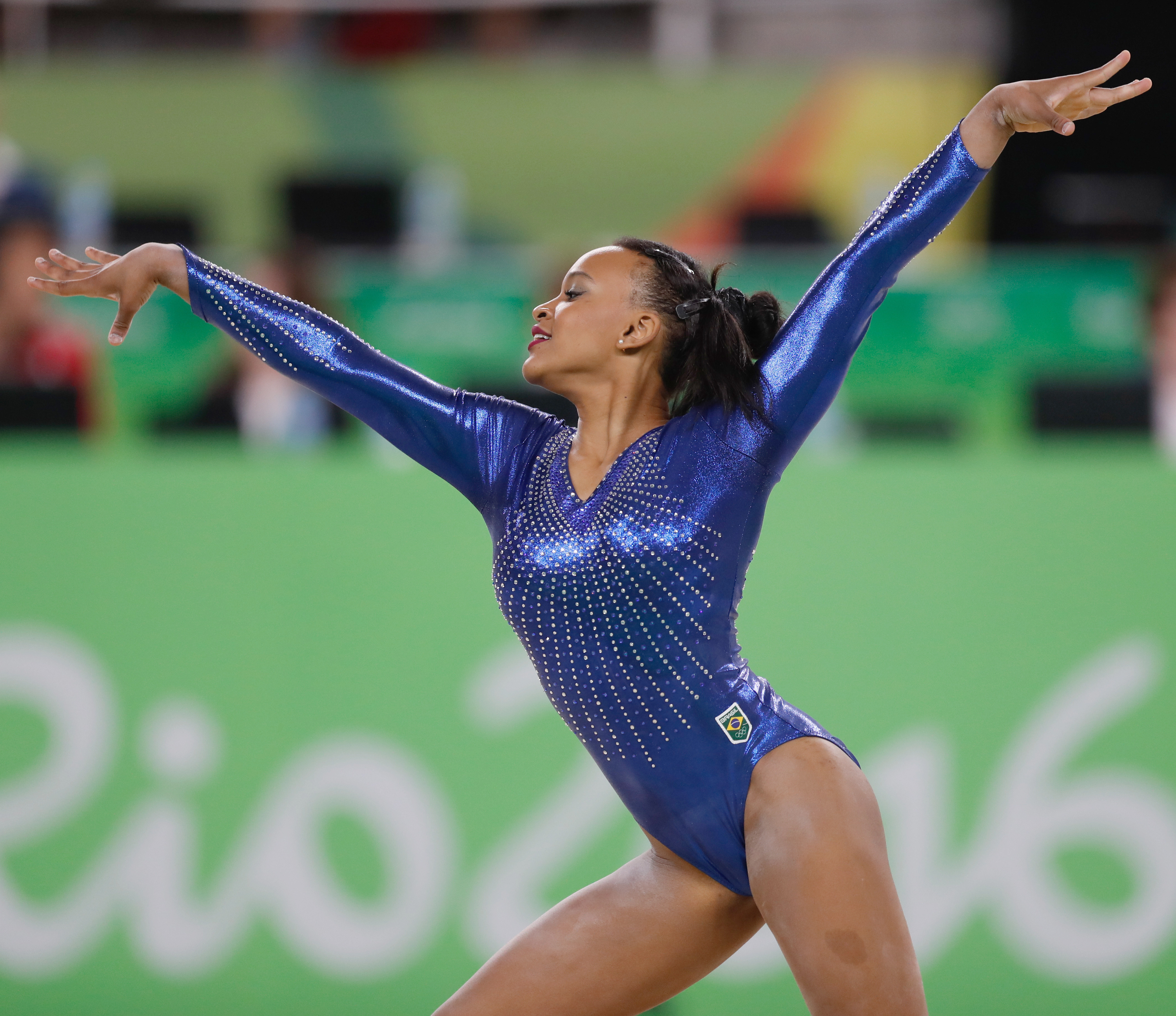
Rebeca Andrade.

Brazil has a large training center for Olympic athletes in artistic gymnastics, which has already revealed athletes such as Rebeca Andrade, Arthur Zanetti, Daiane dos Santos, Jade Barbosa, Flávia Saraiva, Arthur Mariano, Diego Hypólito and Daniele Hypólito. In rhythmic gymnastics, the Brazilian team won an unprecedented bronze in the general event of the Athens, Greece stage of the Rhythmic Gymnastics World Cup, held in March 2023.

=== Modern pentathlon ===
Yane Marques is the only person born in South America to win an Olympic medal in modern pentathlon (until the Tokyo 2020 Olympic Games), having also been the first person in Latin America to do so.

=== Canoeing ===
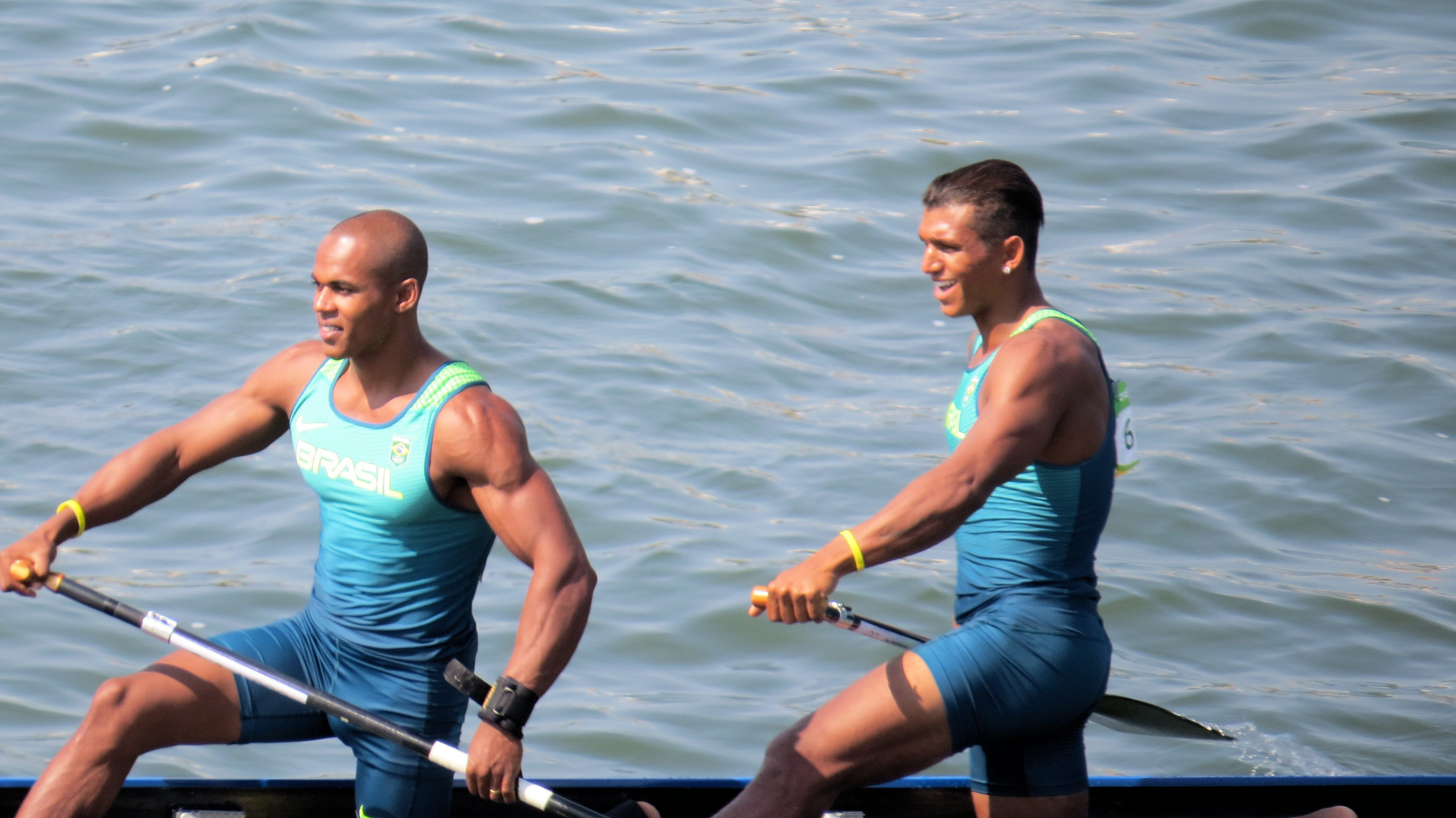
Erlon Silva (front) and Isaquias Queiroz (back).

In sprint canoeing, The Brazilian Isaquias Queiroz is the best canoeist in the history of South America, being the only Olympic champion of this modality on the continent and adding a total of four Olympic medals until the Tokyo 2020 Olympic Games. Erlon Silva also won Olympic silver for Brazil in canoeing.

In slalom canoeing, the best Brazilians in history to date are Ana Sátila and Pepe Gonçalves, who reached the Olympic finals and won medals in World Championships.

=== Archery ===
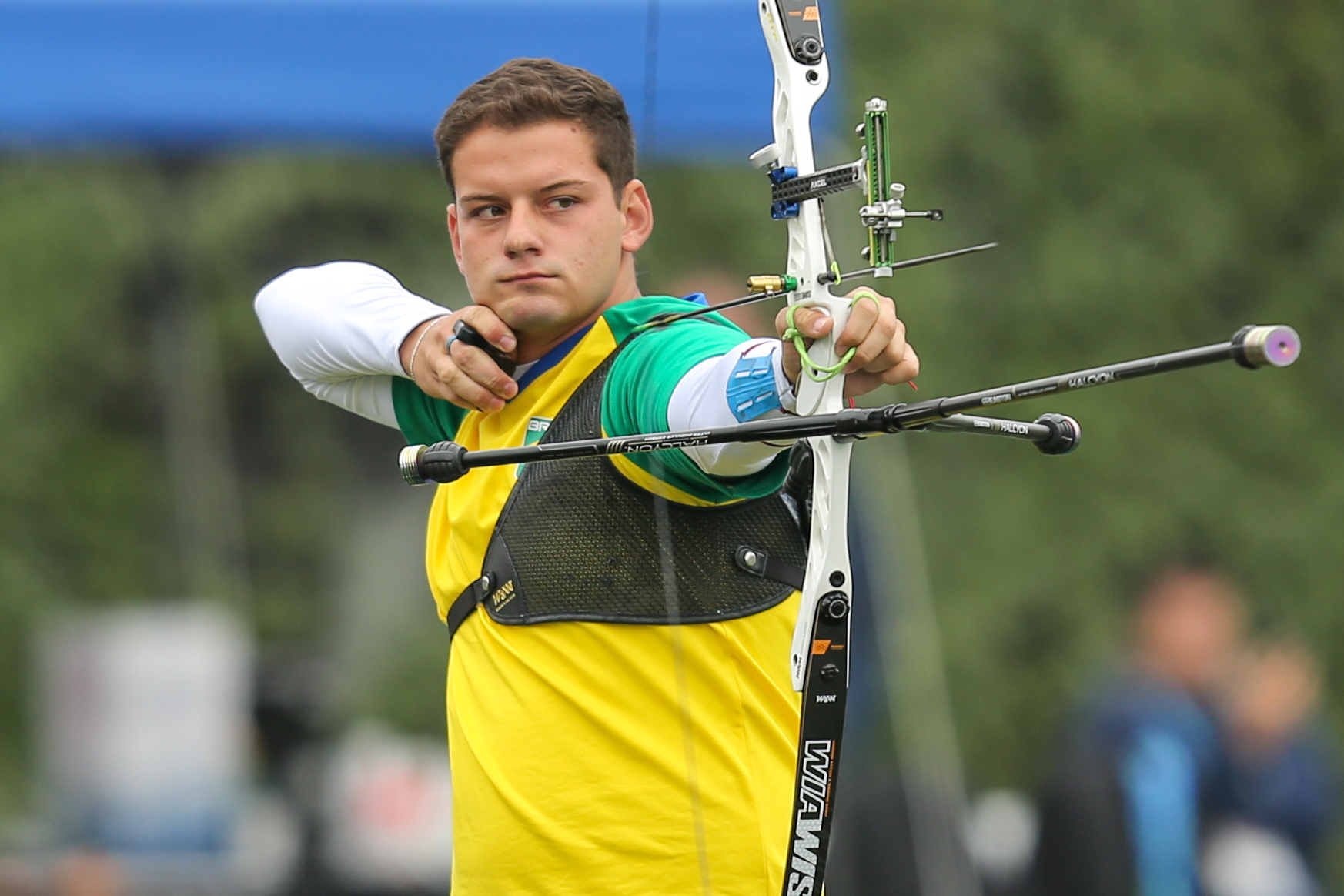
Marcus Vinicius D'Almeida.

Marcus Vinicius D'Almeida, in the recurve bow category, is the greatest male archery athlete in the history of South America, having been number 1 in the world in 2023, and world runner-up in 2021. Ane Marcelle dos Santos went to the 3rd round of the 2016 Olympic Games.

=== Fencing ===
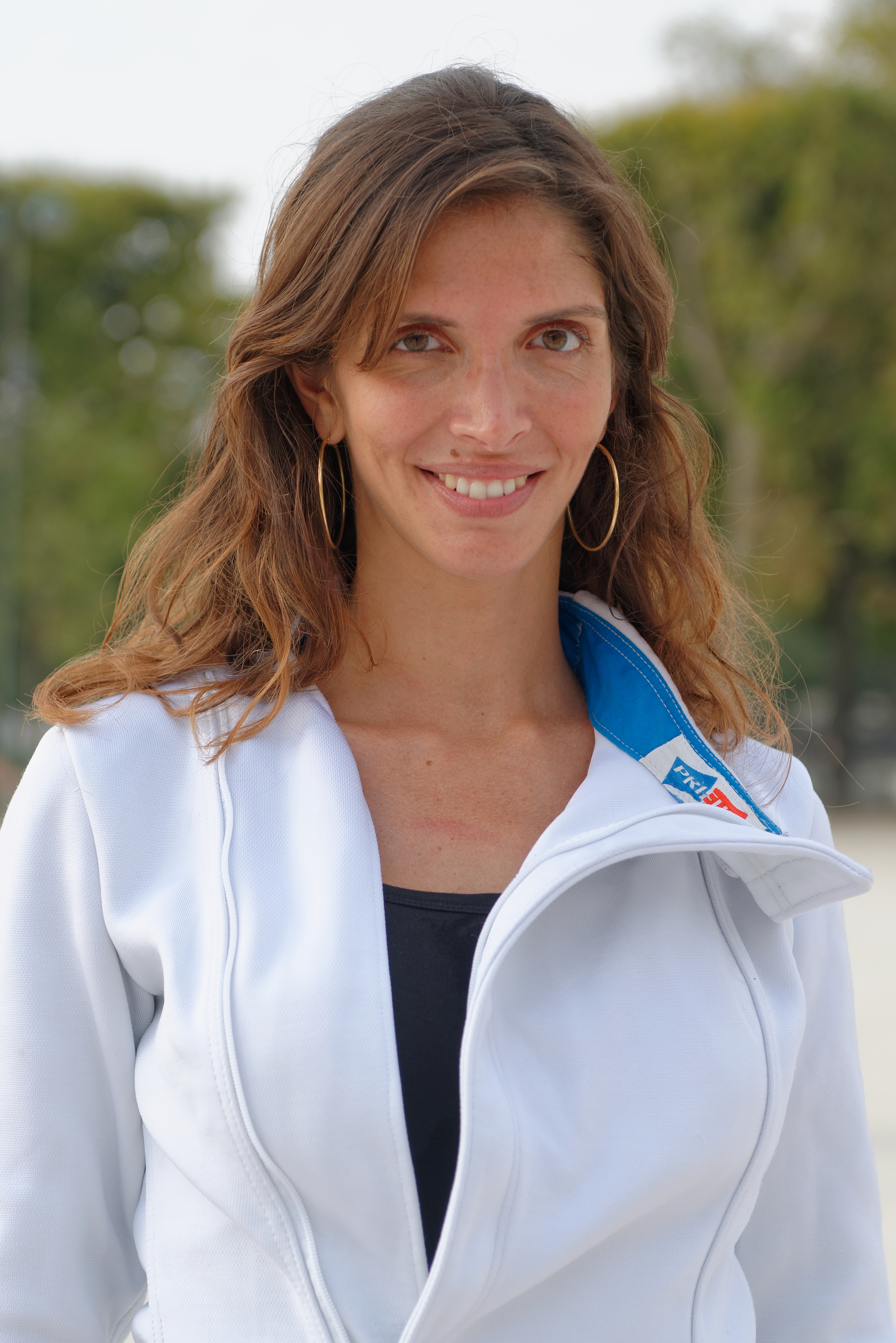
Nathalie Moellhausen.

Although Brazil has little tradition in fencing, the country has produced some renowned athletes. Nathalie Moellhausen was world champion in 2019 and reached the quarter-finals of the 2016 Olympic Games in Women's épée. Guilherme Toldo reached the quarter-finals of the 2016 Summer Olympics in Men's foil.

=== Diving ===
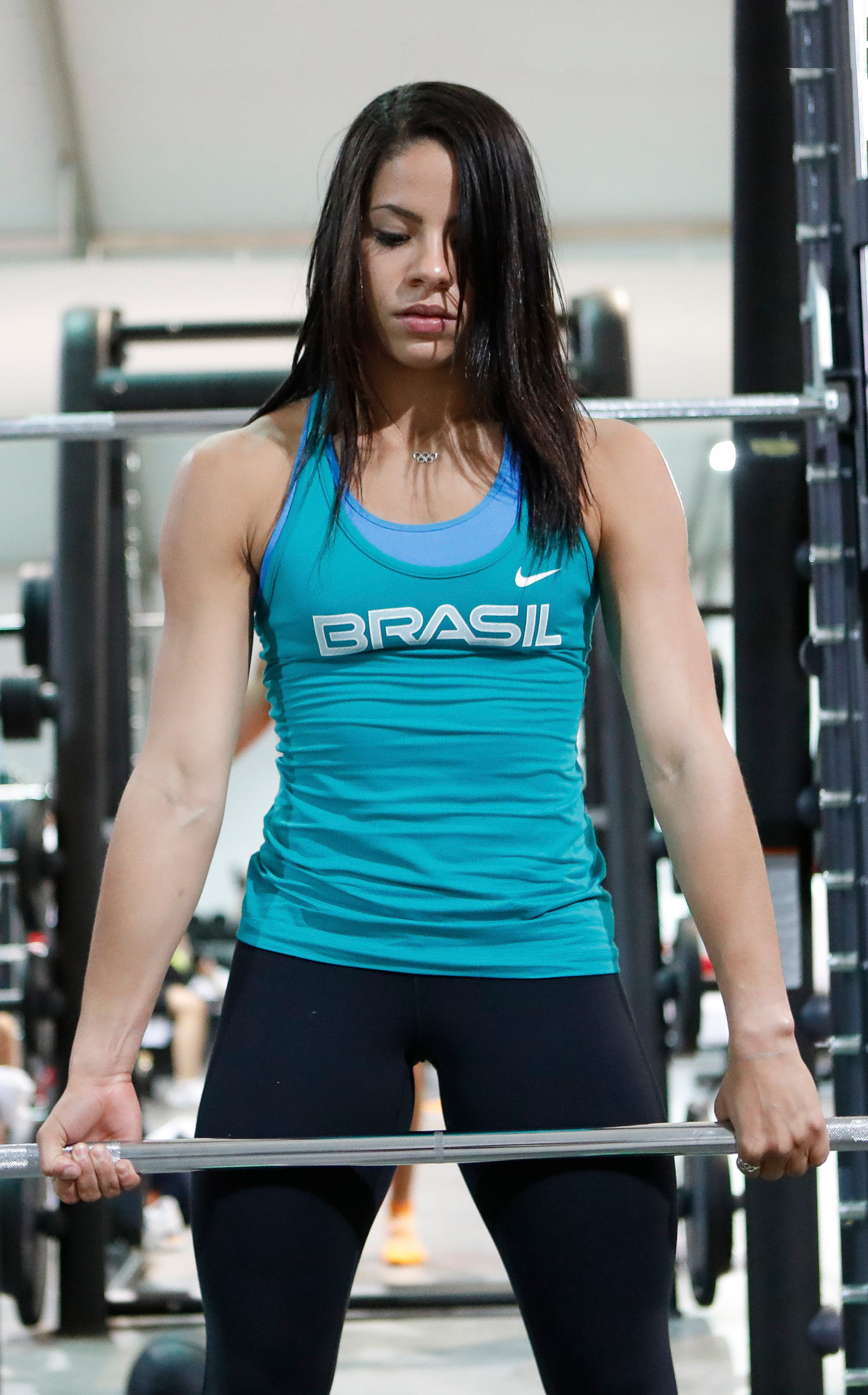
Ingrid de Oliveira.

Brazil also does not have a long tradition in diving, but work carried out over the decades allowed the emergence of some high-level athletes. The most relevant so far are Ingrid de Oliveira, who finished 4th at the 2022 World Aquatics Championships, César Castro, 5th place on the 3-meter springboard at the 2009 Worlds, and Juliana Veloso, 10th place on the platform in 2001.

=== Weightlifting ===
Weightlifting is a sport that began to develop more recently in Brazil. To date, the biggest names in the sport in the country have been Fernando Reis, who won a bronze medal at the 2018 World Weightlifting Championships, and Laura Amaro, who won silver in the subdivision of the event called Snatch, at the 2021 World Weightlifting Championships.

=== American football ===
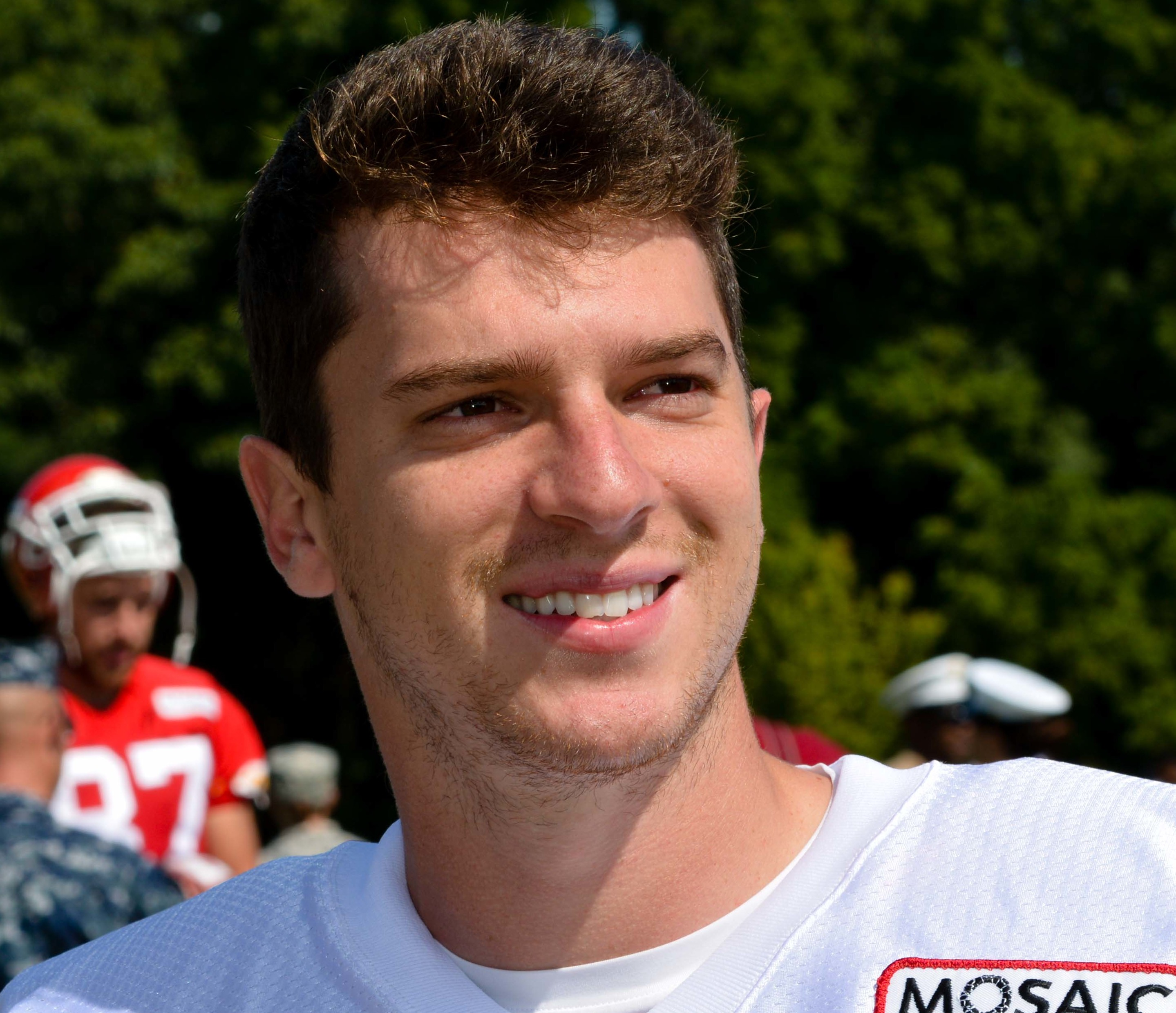
Cairo Santos is the first Brazilian born player in NFL history.

American football is played by young people in some states. The most popular varieties are flag football (especially in São Paulo) and beach American football (played in coastal cities such as Rio de Janeiro, Recife and João Pessoa).

Also, the sport is already one of the most played around the country, with approximately 130 teams. The Superliga Nacional de Futebol Americano (National American Football Superleague) is a recently created Brazilian American football league, created and organized by the Confederação Brasileira de Futebol Americano (Brazilian Confederation of American Football).

=== Rugby union ===
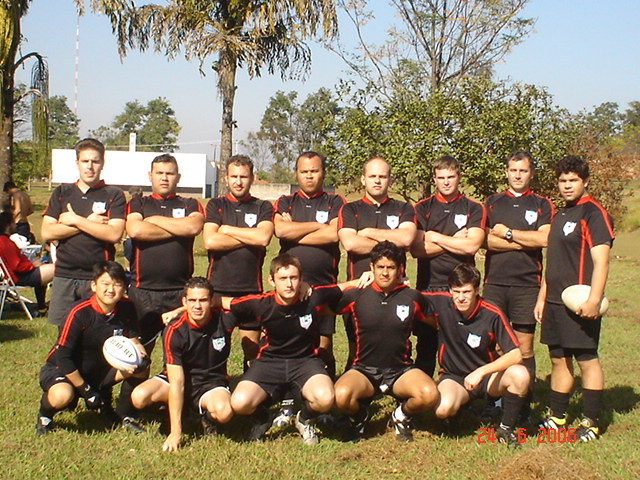
Lobo Bravo, a Brazilian rugby team.

Rugby has been played in Brazil since at least 1888. Although it has been played in Brazil for as long as football, it has never enjoyed its popularity, it's also mostly played amateurly. The Brazil national rugby union team has so far never qualified for a Rugby World Cup, it did secured the South American Rugby Championship for the first time in 2018 and in November the national team had an historical friendly with the Māori All Blacks. A domestic club competition, the Campeonato Brasileiro de Rugby, has been contested annually since 1964. Rugby returned to the Olympics in Rio 2016 (in the 7-a-side tournament form) - see Rugby sevens at the 2016 Summer Olympics. As 2016 Olympic hosts, Brazil men's and women's teams automatically qualified.

The sport is not widely played in schools, but is common in universities. All 27 states were reported to have rugby clubs, but around 50% of the active clubs are located in the São Paulo state. As of 2016, rugby was played by about 60,000 Brazilians and has experienced sizeable growth in the country.

Following the success of their women's programme on the 7s world series, in 2024 the Yaras defeated Colombia, and earned qualification as the South American representative for the 2025 Women's Rugby World Cup held in England.

=== Baseball ===
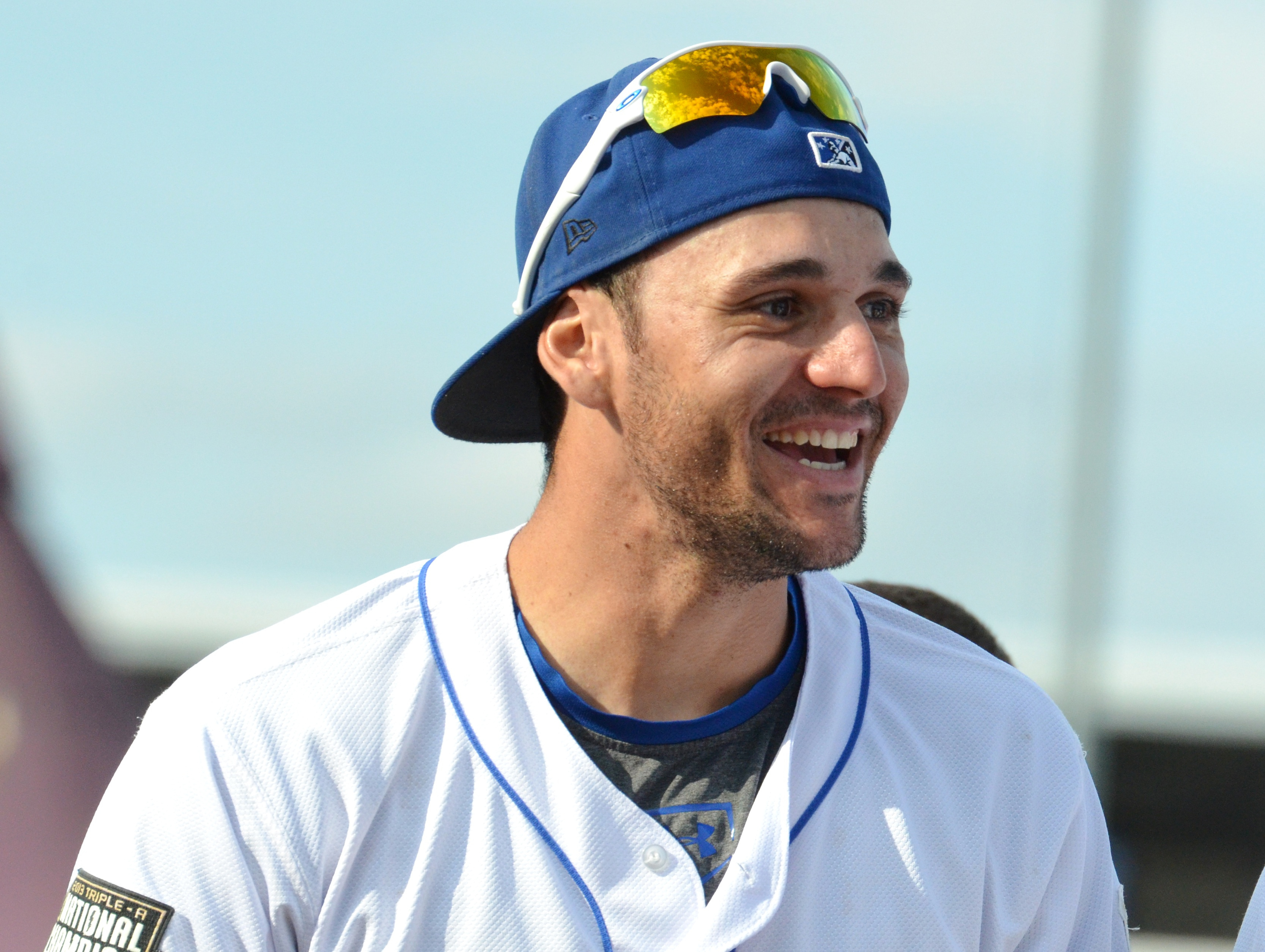
Paulo Orlando became the first Brazilian born player to win the World Series in 2015.

Baseball is traditionally practiced mostly by the Japanese communities in Brazil. It is not very popular in the country, but with the cable TV coverage of the games, baseball is also gaining fans among non-nisseis. There are several regional leagues on the rise in the country, however, the difficulty in finding baseball fields prevents regular practice of the sport that is often played on adapted football fields.

The national team appeared in the 2013 World Baseball Classic. Paulo Orlando and Yan Gomes are the only Brazilians to win the World Series. Brazil returned at the World Baseball Classic at 2026.

The first important feat of Brazilian baseball was achieved in 2023: when participating in the 2023 Pan American Games, the Brazilian team surprised everyone by defeating countries that were in the top 10 in the world and that have a long tradition in the sport, such as Cuba and Venezuela, in addition to Colombia, finishing with the silver medal.

=== Other sports in Brazil ===
In horse racing, Silvestre de Sousa was the British flat racing Champion Jockey in 2015. The Brazilian-bred horse Glória de Campeão won the Dubai World Cup, then the world's richest Thoroughbred race, in 2010 with Brazilian jockey T. J. Pereira aboard.

Curling is a growing sport in Brazil; the creation of a national team was inspired by the audience for the 2010 Winter Olympics in Vancouver. A temporary rink in the Eldorado Shopping Center in São Paulo featured Norwegian curler Linn Githmark and a winter-sports complex is planned, probably in the city of Campos do Jordão.

Frescobol is a native Brazilian sport similar to tennis and cricket, played with a wooden racket and soft rubber ball on the beach with no scoring system. It began during the 1960s on Ipanema beach. Biribol is another native sport created in Birigüi, São Paulo state. It is a kind of volleyball played in a swimming pool. Peteca (shuttlecock) is a native sport which originated from indigenous games.

Rodeo enjoys significant popularity in some rural regions of southern states. The rodeo event of bull riding has become a significant niche sport on its own since the success of Adriano Moraes on the US-based Professional Bull Riders (PBR) circuit in the 1990s and 2000s. PBR now runs a national touring series in Brazil, and Brazilian riders are heavily represented on the main PBR circuit in the US.

Cricket has a Brazilian women's national team, who won the 2018 South American Women's Cricket Championship. See Cricket in Brazil.

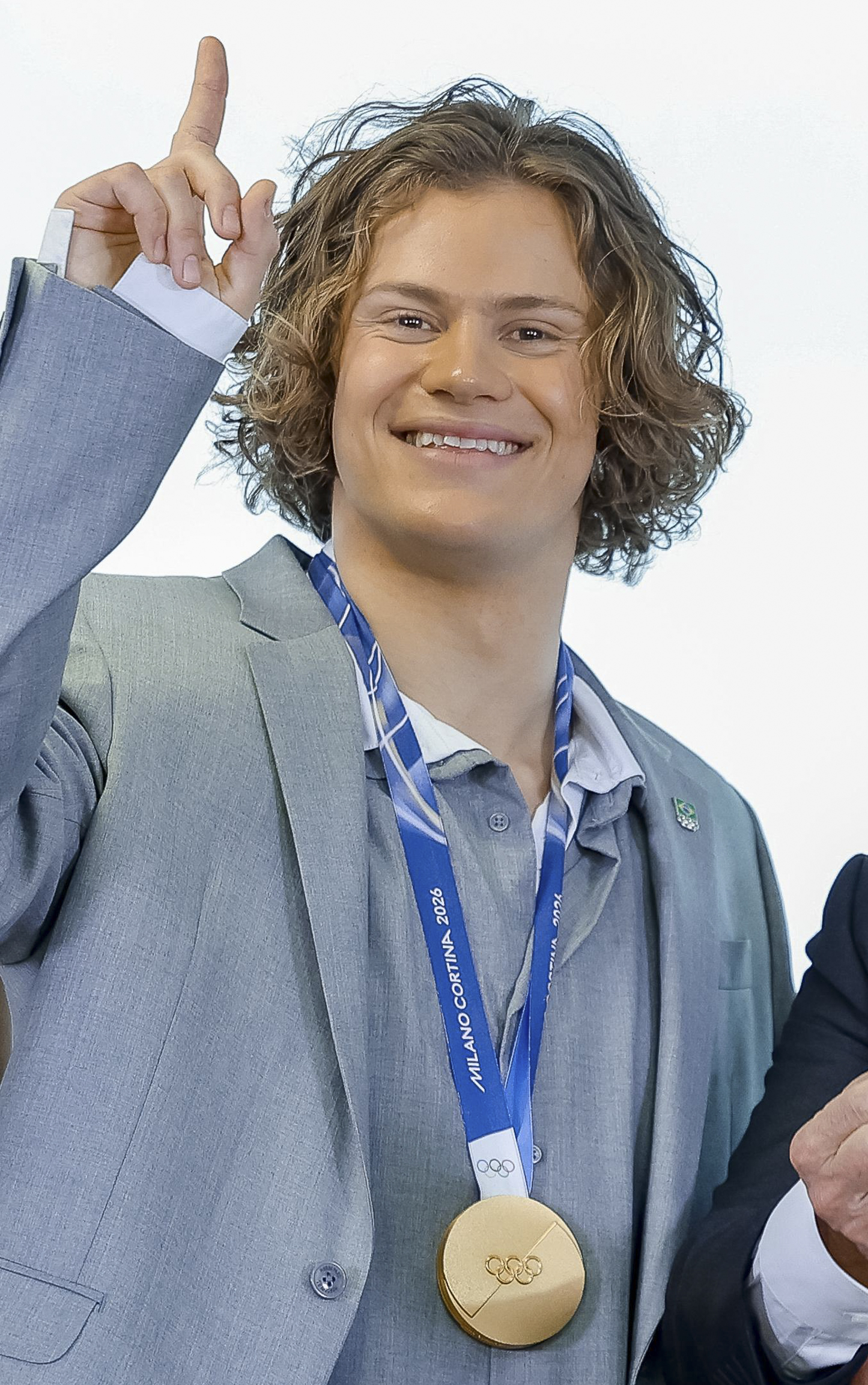
Lucas Pinheiro Braathen

=== Brazil at the Olympics ===
Due to the tropical and subtropical nature of the climate of Brazil, it has not traditionally competed in the Winter Olympics, although it made its first appearance in the 1992 Winter Olympics, and most recently participated in the 2014 Winter Olympics. However, Brazil has been competing in the Summer Olympics since 1920. Brazil is currently ranked 33rd in the overall ranking of medals in the Summer Olympics. Rio de Janeiro hosted the 2016 Summer Olympics, the first Olympic Games held in South America.

In the 2026 Winter Olympics, Brazil took home its first gold medal. This was the first gold medal for any South American at a Winter Games. This was won by Lucas Pinheiro Braathen in the Giant slalom event with a time of 2:25.00.

=== Sports in media ===
On television, football is one of the most watched sports on both free and paid television, games from regional teams often result in top audiences in its cities, also European football (especially UEFA Champions League) are result in high viewing figures.

In motorsport, the main national competitions are Stock Car Brasil and Fórmula Truck. Formula One is considered the second most watched sport in terms of TV audience, behind football. The IndyCar Series also has a good fanbase in Brazil.

MMA in a short period of time has become the second most broadcast sport on Brazilian TV, due mainly to the resounding success of Brazilian fighters in the UFC.

Men's and women's volleyball matches attract substantial viewership, where the national teams, the Superliga, and beach volleyball draw large audiences.

Basketball is also widely broadcast, prominently the national league (NBB), the NBA and FIBA. Basketball's level of popularity is returning to its historical levels.

In recent years, American football has been gaining fast popularity, with NFL games guaranteeing an audience on ESPN Brasil and Esporte Interativo. Also, some Torneio Touchdown (Brazilian League) games are shown by BandSports. In 2016, the two main leagues merged into the Superliga Nacional.

Curling was the latest sporting phenomenon in Brazil in terms of audience. During the 2013 World Women's Curling Championship, held in late March in Canada, about 3.6 million people watched the channel SporTV, leading audiences among sports channels on pay TV. The audience was even greater during the men's worlds that year.

Bossaball is a team sport that originated in Brazil and was conceptualised by Belgian Filip Eyckmans in 2004.[1] Bossaball is a ball game between two teams, combining elements of volleyball, football, and gymnastics with music into a sport. It is played on an inflatable court featuring a trampoline on each side of the net.[2] The trampolines allow the players to bounce high enough to spike the ball over the net.

Major sports leagues on Brazilian television
| League | Sport | TV(s) |
|---|---|---|
| FIFA World Cup | Football | Globo, Band, SporTV, ESPN Brasil, Fox Sports and BandSports |
| Olympic Games | International Olympic Committee; Various Sports | Globo, Record, Band, SporTV, BandSports and ESPN |
| Winter Games | International Olympic Committee; Various Sports | Globo, Record, Band, SporTV and BandSports |
| Pan American Games | Various Sports | Record and SporTV |
| Campeonato Brasileiro Série A | Football | Globo, Band, SporTV and Premiere FC |
| Copa do Brasil | Football | Globo, Band, SporTV, ESPN Brasil and Fox Sports |
| Copa Libertadores | Football | SBT, Fox Sports and SporTV |
| Copa Sudamericana | Football | Fox Sports and SporTV |
| UEFA Champions League | Football | ESPN Brasil, SBT, Band and TV Esporte Interativo |
| UEFA Europa League | Football | SBT, TV Esporte Interativo and ESPN Brasil |
| FIVB Volleyball Men's World Championship | Volleyball | SporTV |
| FIVB Volleyball Women's World Championship | Volleyball | SporTV |
| FIVB Volleyball Men's World Cup | Volleyball | SporTV |
| FIVB Volleyball Women's World Cup | Volleyball | SporTV |
| FIVB Volleyball World Grand Champions Cup | Volleyball | Globo and SporTV |
| FIVB Volleyball World League | Volleyball | Globo and SporTV |
| FIVB Volleyball World Grand Prix | Volleyball | Globo and SporTV |
| FIVB Volleyball Men's Club World Championship | Volleyball | SporTV |
| FIVB Volleyball Women's Club World Championship | Volleyball | SporTV |
| FIVB Beach Volleyball World Tour | Volleyball | SporTV |
| FIVB Beach Volleyball World Championships | Volleyball | SporTV |
| Superliga Brasileira de Voleibol | Volleyball | tv cultura and SporTV |
| CEV Champions League | Volleyball | BandSports |
| Novo Basquete Brasil | Basketball | tv cultura |
| NBA | Basketball | ESPN Brasil, Space and Sports+ |
| FIBA Americas League | Basketball | Fox Sports |
| EuroLeague | Basketball | Sports+ |
| Liga Futsal | Futsal | SporTV and ESPN Brasil |
| NFL | American football | ESPN Brasil and TV Esporte Interativo |
| NCAA Football | College American football | ESPN Brasil |
| National Hockey League | Ice hockey | ESPN Brasil |
| Major League Baseball | Baseball | ESPN Brasil |
| Six Nations Championship | Rugby Union | ESPN Brasil |
| European Rugby Champions Cup | Rugby Union | ESPN Brasil |
| The Rugby Championship | Rugby Union | ESPN Brasil |
| Rugby World Cup | Rugby Union | ESPN Brasil |

== Gallery ==
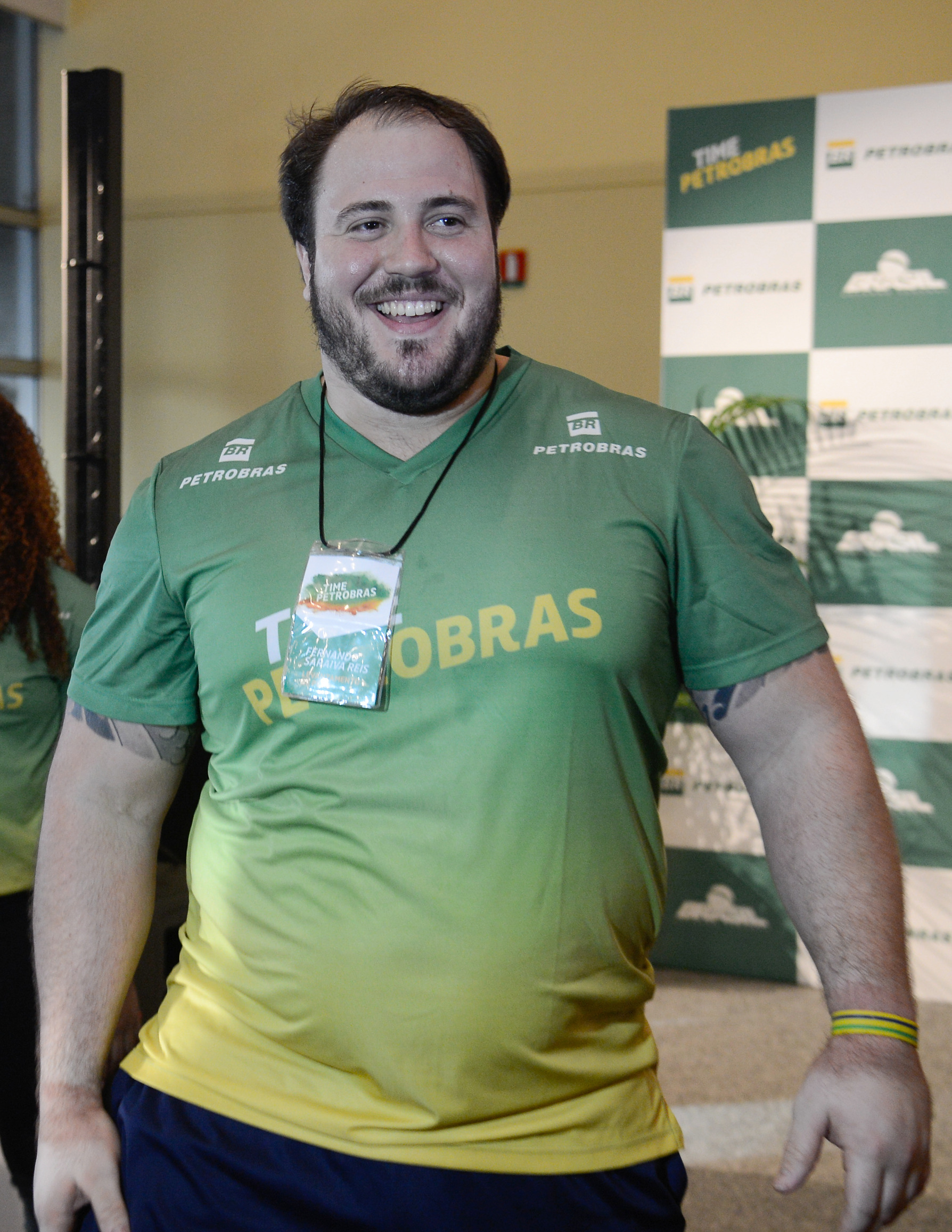
Fernando Reis

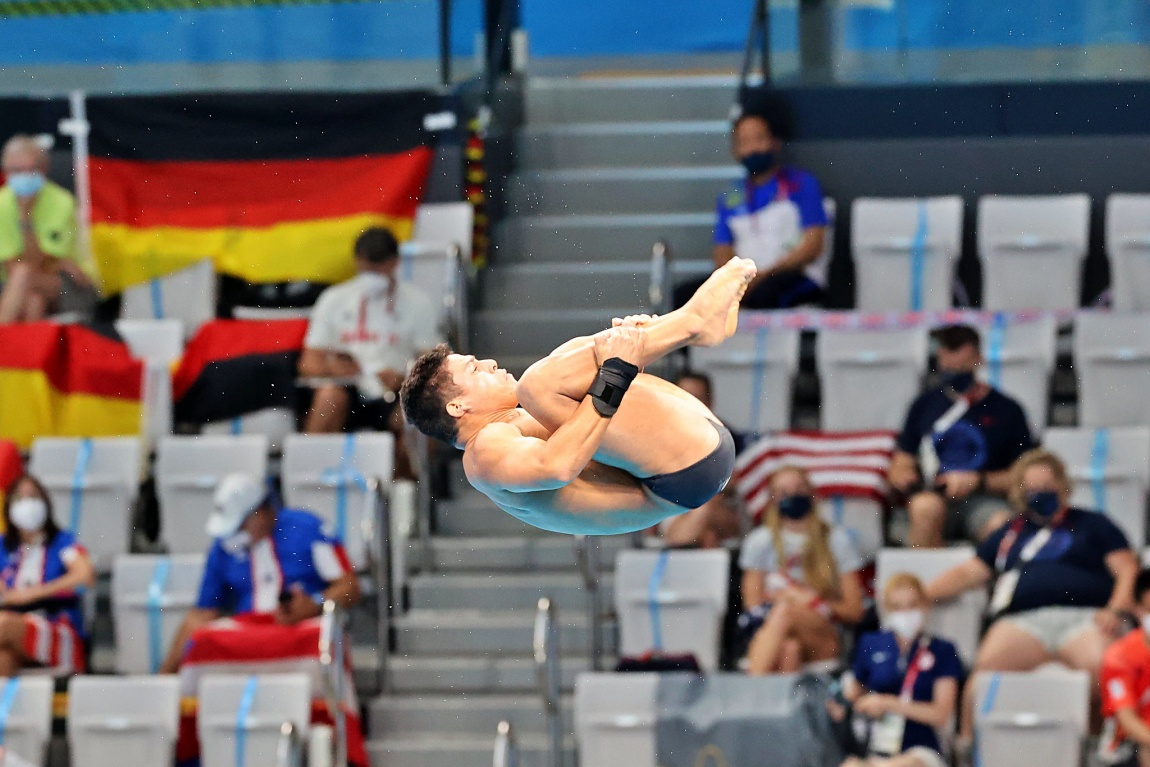
Kawan Pereira

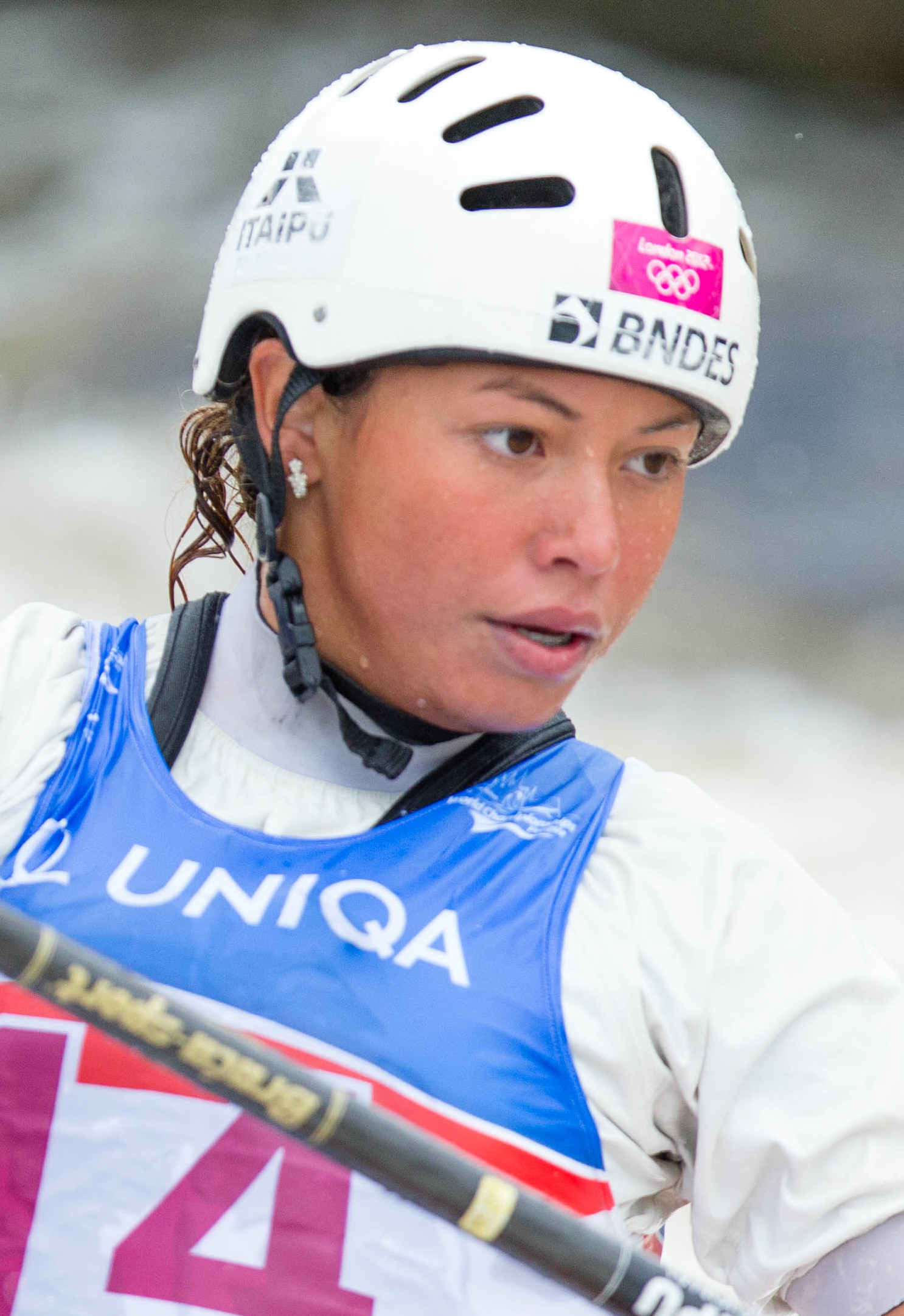
Ana Sátila

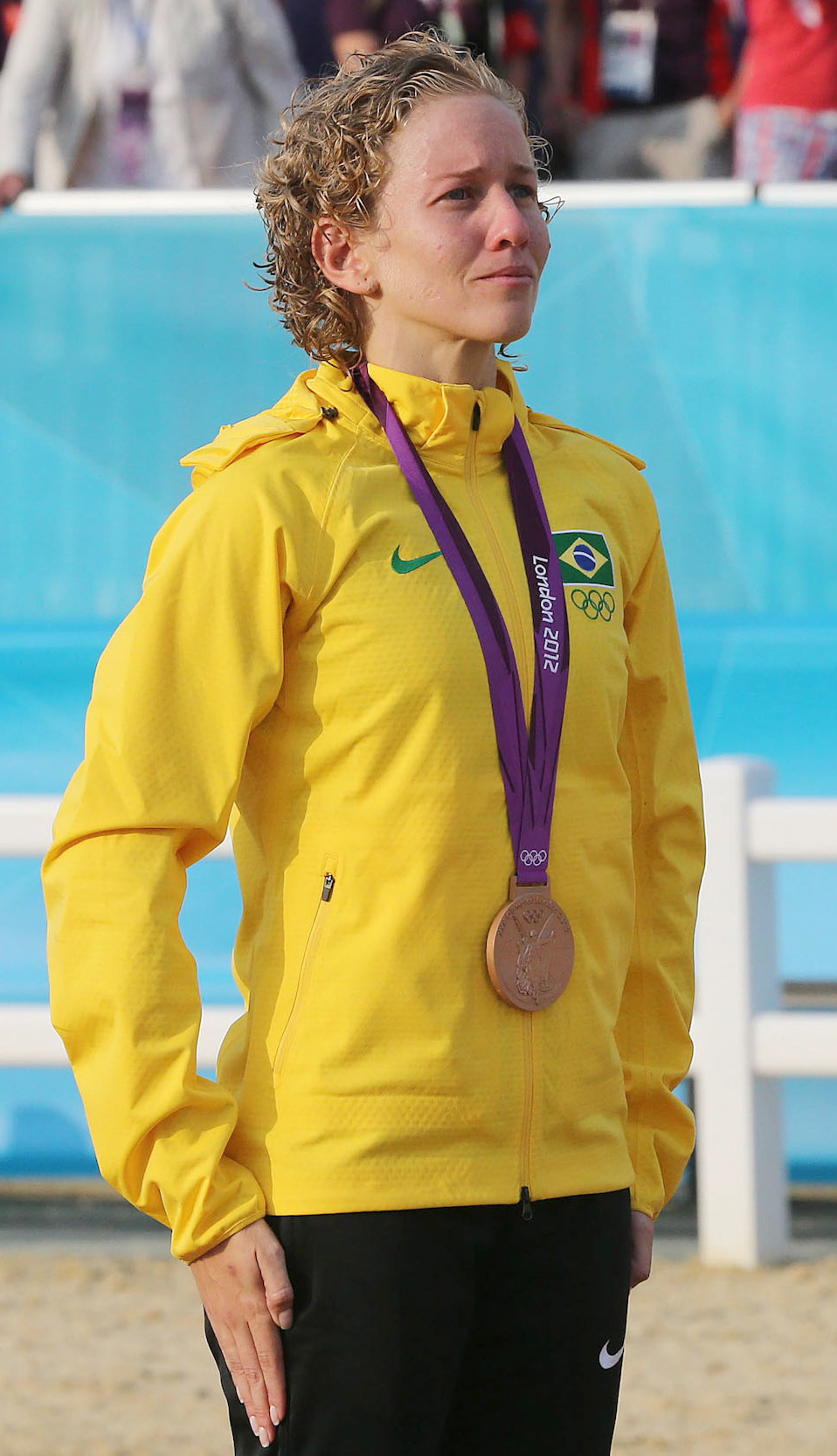
Yane Marques

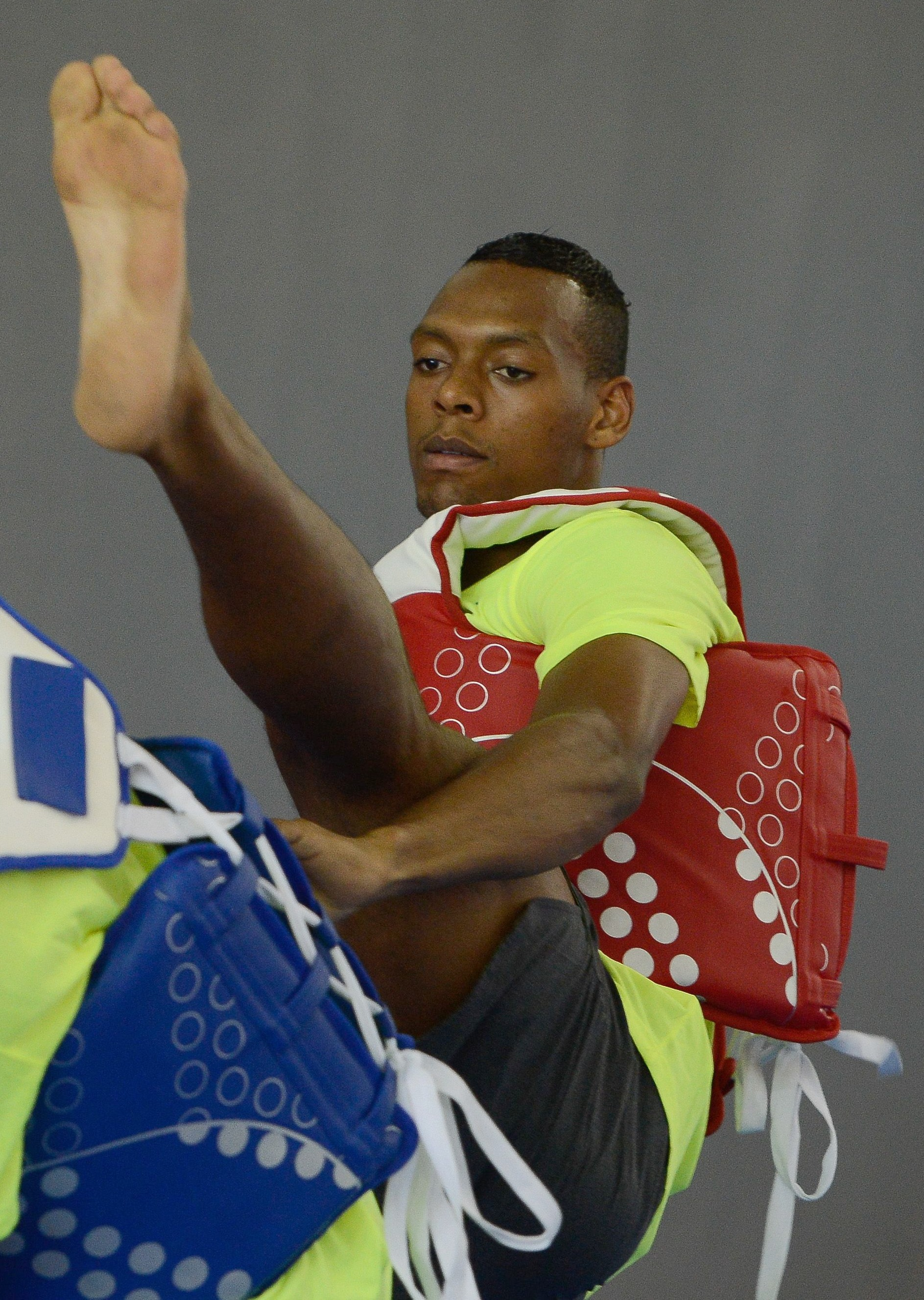
Maicon Andrade

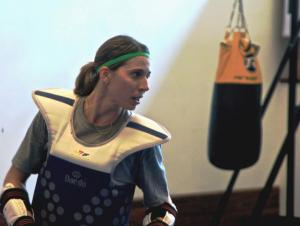
Natália Falavigna

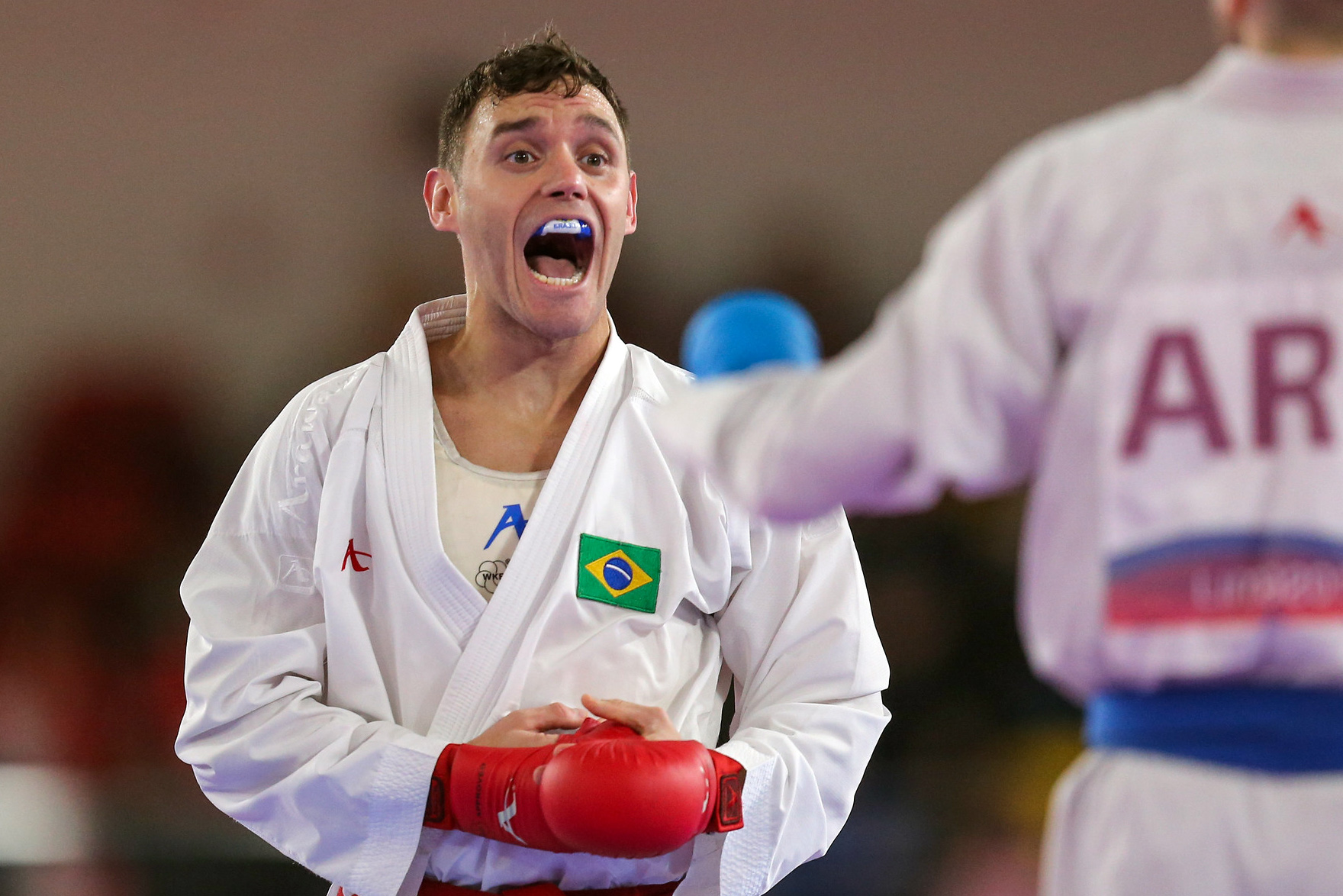
Douglas Brose

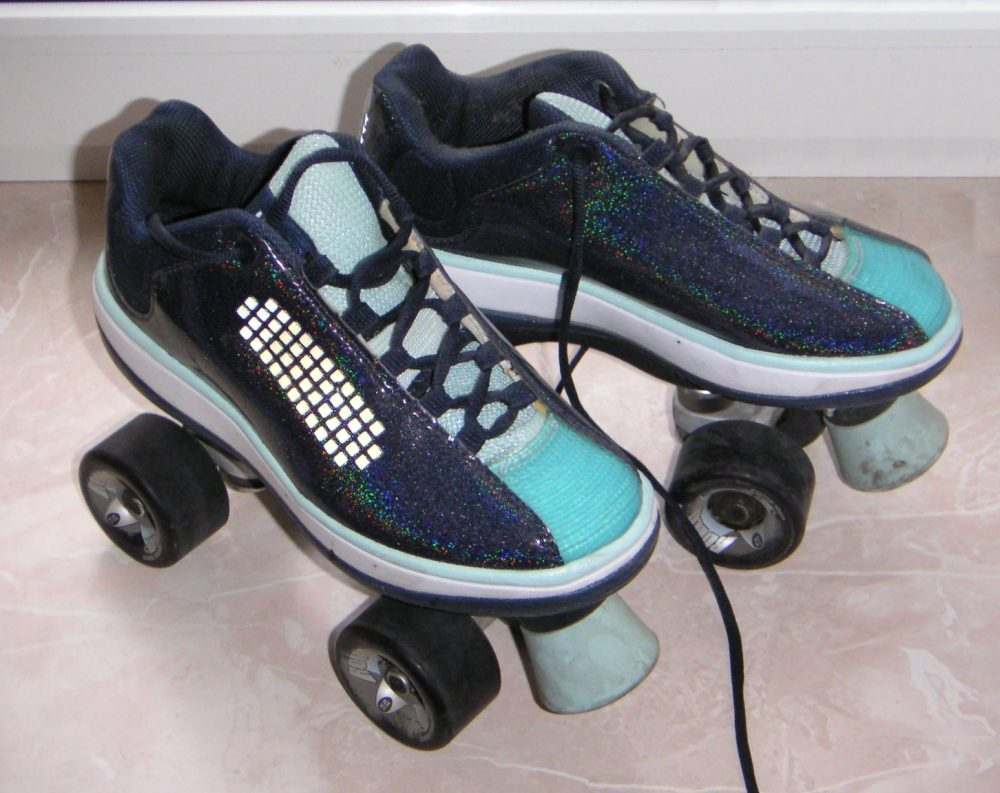
Marcel Stürmer

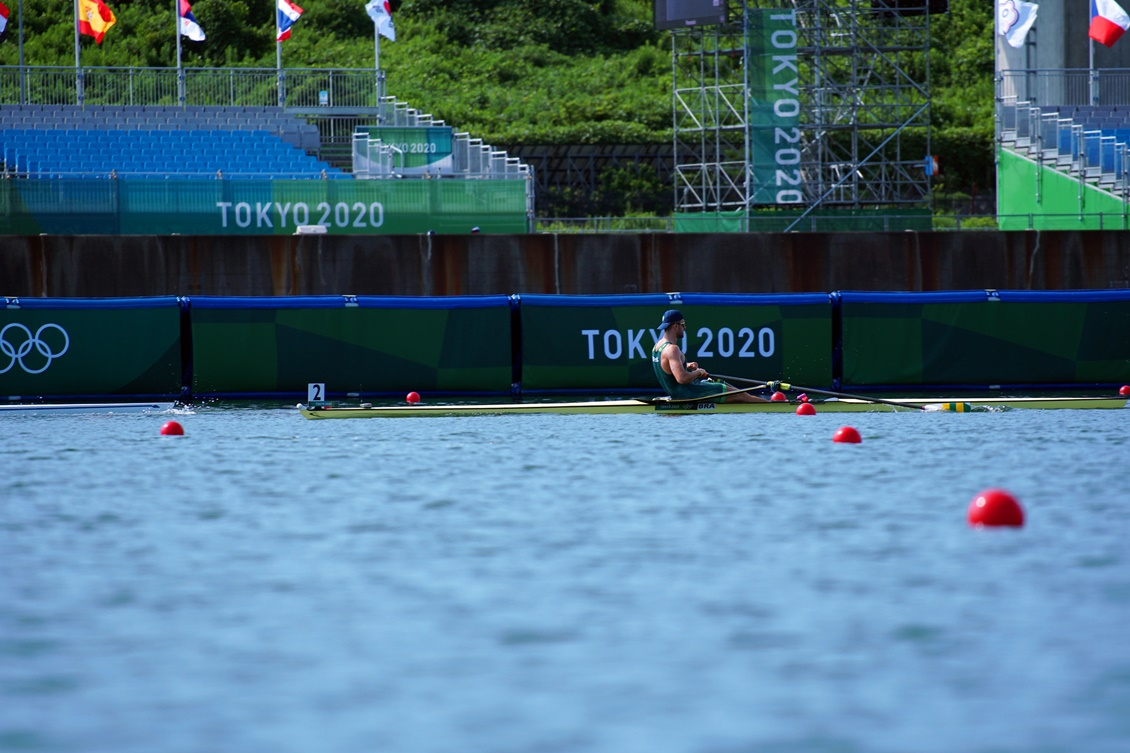
Lucas Verthein

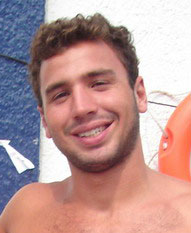
Felipe Perrone

== Competitions hosted by Brazil ==
Some of the most important sports competitions hosted by the country were:

- 2016 Summer Olympics
- 1950 FIFA World Cup
- 2014 FIFA World Cup
- 1963 Pan American Games
- 2007 Pan American Games
- 2002 South American Games
- 1995 FINA World Swimming Championships (25 m)
- 1954 FIBA World Championship
- 1963 FIBA World Championship
- 1957 FIBA World Championship for Women
- 1971 FIBA World Championship for Women
- 1983 FIBA World Championship for Women
- 2006 FIBA World Championship for Women
- 1960 FIVB Volleyball Men's World Championship
- 1990 FIVB Volleyball Men's World Championship
- 1994 FIVB Volleyball Women's World Championship
- 1965 World Judo Championships
- 2007 World Judo Championships
- 2013 World Judo Championships
- 2011 World Women's Handball Championship
- 2016 World Fencing Championships
- 2003 Beach Volleyball World Championships
- 1998 World Karate Championships
- 2008 FIFA Futsal World Cup
- 2005 FIFA Beach Soccer World Cup
- 2006 FIFA Beach Soccer World Cup
- 2007 FIFA Beach Soccer World Cup
- 1997 ICF Canoe Slalom World Championships
- 2007 ICF Canoe Slalom World Championships
- 2018 ICF Canoe Slalom World Championships
- 2019 World Skateboarding Championship
- 1960 Star World Championship (Sailing)
- 1980 Star World Championships (Sailing)
- 1996 Star World Championships (Sailing)
- 1977 Laser World Championships (Sailing)
- 2005 Laser World Championships (Sailing)
- 2005 Laser Radial World Championships (Sailing)
- 1998 Tornado World Championship (Sailing)
- 1980 470 World Championships (Sailing)
- 1996 470 World Championships (Sailing)
- 2013 RS:X World Championships (Sailing)
- 1986 Flying Dutchman World Championship (Sailing)
- 1988 Finn Gold Cup (Sailing)
- 2004 Finn Gold Cup (Sailing)
- 1978 Soling World Championship (Sailing)
- 2004 Soling World Championship (Sailing)
- 1983 Optimist World Championship (Sailing)
- 2009 Optimist World Championship (Sailing)
- 1991 Europe World Championships (Sailing)
- 2000 Europe World Championships (Sailing)
- 2013 FIFA Confederations Cup
- 1919 South American Championship (Copa América)
- 1922 South American Championship (Copa América)
- 1949 South American Championship (Copa América)
- 1989 Copa América
- 2019 Copa América
- 2021 Copa América

Competitions hosted annually:

- Brazilian Grand Prix
- Rio Open (tennis)
- Saint Silvester Road Race
- São Paulo International Marathon
- Grande Prêmio Brasil (Equestrianism)
- WTT Contender Rio / Star Contender Foz do Iguaçu (Table Tennis)

Discontinued events:

- Brazilian motorcycle Grand Prix
- Champ Car event into 1996–1999
- WCT/WQS Surf championships from 1985 to 2001

== See also ==
- Sport in South America
- Button Football
