= Cricket in Brazil =

- Country: Brazil
- Governing body: Brazilian Cricket Association
- National team: Brazil

International competitions
- Cricket World Cup; ICC T20 World Cup; ICC Champions Trophy; Women's Cricket World Cup; Under-19 Cricket World Cup

Cricket is a growing sport in Brazil, presently in nascent stages. Interest in the sport dates back earlier than 1860, which saw the establishment of the country's first official cricket ground, but it wasn't until 2003 that Brazil became a member of the International Cricket Council and emerged onto the world stage. Since then, cricket has become increasingly popular among native Brazilians, with the formation of a women's team and several junior competitions.

== History ==
Cricket in Brazil began in the mid-1800s in Rio de Janeiro, during a period when a substantial portion of the city's population was British or of British descent. By the early 1860s, a number of cricket clubs were in operation, including the British CC, Artisan Amateurs CC, Rio British CC, Anglo-Brazilian CC and the British and American Club, although its playing facilities were limited to makeshift open spaces. Rio's Brazilian residents at the time had little or no interest in sport of any kind.

Beginning in 1860, as part of a much-needed beautification programme for the city, Emperor Dom Pedro II created several new parks, including a large grassed area in front of his daughter Princess Isabel's house, on Rua Paysandu in the Laranjeiras district. Due to good relations between the British community and the Brazilian monarchy, this space eventually became the country's first proper cricket ground, and hosted cricket, tennis and bowls matches for many years. Princess Isabel and her father were frequent spectators, and often called upon to present trophies to the winners.

In 1872, George Cox formed the Rio Cricket Club, which soon began using the field as its home. In 1901, George's son Oscar organized football games on this same ground. In 1889, Brazil became a Republic and Princess Isabel was forced to move from her residence. The cricket ground was taken over by the new government, and although the sport was allowed to continue for a time, a permanent facility was now required. In 1897, the newly renamed Rio Cricket and Athletic Association purchased a large property in Niterói, on the other side of Guanabara Bay. A cricket ground was built and hosted its first match on 19 June 1898. Cricket would continue to be played on this ground for the next 97 years. As the local British population declined steadily through the 1970s and 1980s, however, cricket at the club faded away, and today the Rio Cricket ground is used exclusively for football.

During those early days of cricket in Rio de Janeiro, the sport was also springing up at British sports clubs elsewhere in the country, including: the São Paulo Athletic Club in São Paulo (founded in 1888); the Santos Athletic Club in São Paulo (1889); Clube Internacional de Cricket and Club de Cricket Victoria, both in Salvador, Bahia (both founded in 1899); and the British Country Club in Recife, Pernambuco (1920). Teams and grounds were also created at the British-owned Morro Velho mine just outside Belo Horizonte in Minas Gerais (1887), and at the Frigorífico Anglo plant in Barretos, São Paulo (1913), where cricket was played until the mid-1990s. Cricket was also played at the Fazenda dos Ingleses in Caraguatatuba, on the coast of São Paulo, from 1927 until the Second World War.

It was in São Paulo, however, where the sport really took hold, and the São Paulo Athletic Club (SPAC) remains the country's centre of cricket to this day. In 1894, Charles Miller, the Brazilian-born son of British parents, returned from his studies in England with a football and some cricket equipment, which he immediately used to introduce these sports to the locals. In 1888, the São Paulo Athletic Club was formed, and Charles was a key member, organizing São Paulo's first football and cricket matches at the club's ground in the Consolação district. Football soon caught on, and Charles is known throughout the country as the father of Brazilian football. From 1928 to 1947 the club's cricket matches were held at a ground in Pirituba, before moving to the current site in Veleiros (Santo Amaro), which also houses a collection of Brazilian cricket memorabilia.

== Revival and Governing Body ==
In 1922, the Brazil Cricket Association (BCA) was formed, with R.A. Brooking as its first President. The member clubs were Rio Cricket, the Pernambuco Athletic Club, Santos Athletic Club, São Paulo Athletic Club and the Paysandu Cricket Club. The BCA helped continue the series of matches that had been held between these clubs for many years, as well as interstate and international games. In fact, matches between São Paulo and Rio began in 1878 and continued regularly until 1995.

As cricket in Rio de Janeiro faded from the scene, it was left to São Paulo to carry the torch until 1989, when the Brasília Cricket (BCC) was formed, which today fields three men's teams and two women's teams. In 1999 in Curitiba, Paraná, British bank HSBC built a cricket ground at its staff sports facility, which is now home to three men's teams, while São Paulo has three men's teams as well.

To keep pace with this rejuvenation of cricket activity in Brazil, the national Associação Brasileira de Cricket (ABC) was founded in 2001, and Brazil became an Affiliate Member of the International Cricket Council (ICC) in 2003. The ABC's continuing goal is to grow the sport throughout the country, particularly among Brazilians themselves. Since joining the ICC, cricket in Brazil has grown steadily, thanks primarily to financial and technical support from the ICC.

== International competition ==
Matches between Brazil and Argentina began in 1888, while Rio Cricket began a series of matches with Club Atlético River Plate from Montevideo, Uruguay in 1902. The old Brazil Cricket Association continued to stage matches with Argentina for many years, with Charles Miller playing for the Brazil team until the 1920s. Brazil also hosted the New Zealand XI in the mid-1970s.

With the creation of the South American Championships (SAC) in 1995, Brazilian cricket entered its modern era. The national team has since participated in all eight SACs, hosting the event for the first time in April 2009 (SAC8). In other non-ICC international matches, Brazil has hosted the Chilean team twice (2000 and 2003), the Mexican team once (2009), and the MCC twice (1978 and 2007).

In 2006, Brazil qualified to join the ICC World Cricket League – a pathway to the ICC Cricket World Cup. Brazil competed in the inaugural ICC Americas Division 3 tournament in Suriname in 2006, as well as in Buenos Aires in 2008 and Santiago in 2009.

Brazil won its first ICC tournament at the Americas Division 3 championship in Santiago, Chile in October 2009. As a result of winning this event, Brazil was promoted to Division 2 of the Americas WCL. Unfortunately its first participation in Division 2 in the Bahamas in February resulted in four straight losses and a return to Division 3.

Historically, the national team has consisted solely of expatriates, but this is changing. In recent years, the number of Brazilian cricketers representing their country has steadily increased. The winning Brazil squad in Santiago, for example, included six Brazilian-born players.

== Domestic competition ==
The Brazil national league is made up of nine teams, which compete for the Commonwealth Ambassador's Trophy. The teams are as follows: Candangos, Brasília and Pakistan Plus from the state of Distrito Federal, the Sao Paulo Indians, SPAC and Sao Paulo from Sao Paulo state, while the state of Paraná is represented by Swadisht, Gralha Azul and Parana.

Since 2000, Sao Paulo has won five league titles, while Brasília has won twice and Paraná once. Teams play 40-over-a-side matches from March to October. In November each year, a Twenty20 tournament between the three state representative sides is held. This tournament rotates from year to year between the three major cities.

In addition to this competition, Saquarembo CC is a Sao Paulo-based group of former Brazil players which plays just a few exhibition matches a year against Rest of the World (SP).

== Development programme ==
With Brazil's entry into the ICC came the creation of junior development programmes in Brasília, Sao Paulo and Curitiba.

In Brasília, a big breakthrough came when cricket was offered as an accredited PE course at the national University of Brasília. This led to the formation of the Candangos team, made up wholly of Brazilians. It also created interest amongst female students and resulted in the beginnings of women's cricket in Brasília. In terms of junior development, there is a growing number of boys participating in regular training sessions and games, giving the core of a future U17s team.

In Sao Paulo, progress is being made through a working relationship between St Paul's School and SPAC (the Sao Paulo Athletic Club). Enthusiastic people are in place to develop children's cricket further in Sao Paulo.

In Curitiba the focus has been on teaching children aged 8–12. The Associaçao Brasileira de Cricket employed a local junior development officer/coach for three years, and the success of the programme, which works with about 300 kids at four schools, was recognized by the ICC through the Volunteer of the Year Award presented to Norman Baldwin and to the programme itself for Best Junior Development Programme. This ongoing programme provided the platform for a very successful U13s tournament held in July 2009 in Curitiba, played between Argentina, the eventual winners, Chile and Brazil.

In addition to these three main centres of cricket, there are promising signs of life in the northern city of Fortaleza, and most recently, in Rio de Janeiro, the original home of Brazilian cricket. Development programmes are planned for these cities with a view towards increasing the number of teams in the domestic competition in the near future.

To help ensure the continuity and raise the level of the games, coaching, umpiring and scoring courses are being run throughout the year in all three cities, conducted by the coaches and umpires who have received ICC training. At present there are more than 20 level-one umpires.

In terms of facility development, Brazil is a little behind some of the other countries in the region. In Curitiba, the HSBC ground is very scenic and has a net, but is too small for ICC tournaments. In Brasília, there is still a need for a proper-sized, permanent ground, though the club does have two permanent nets at the Australian embassy. In Sao Paulo, where SAC8 was held, there have been a number of improvements at the full-size SPAC ground, including a new portable net.

== See also ==
- Bete-ombro, a popular Brazilian variant of street cricket
- Sport in Brazil
- Brazil cricket team
- Brazil women's national cricket team
