= Brazil national volleyball team =

Brazil national volleyball team may refer to:

- Brazil men's national volleyball team
- Brazil women's national volleyball team
