= 1995 Star World Championships =

International sailing regatta

The 1995 Star World Championships were held in Laredo, Spain between September 10 and 16, 1995.

== Results ==
Results of individual races
| Pos | Crew | Country | I | II | III | IV | V | VI | Tot | Pts |
|---|---|---|---|---|---|---|---|---|---|---|
| Gold medal | Mark Reynolds (H); Hal Haenel | United States | 20 | 1 | 3 | 8 | 3 | 2 | 37 | 17 |
| Silver medal | Torben Schmidt Grael (H); Marcelo Ferreira | Brazil | 4 | 26 | 9 | 5 | 1 | 1 | 46 | 20 |
| Bronze medal | Christian Rasmussen (H); Kasper Harsberg | Denmark | 7 | 6 | 2 | 7 | 9 | 5 | 36 | 27 |
| 4 | Colin Beashel (H); David Giles | Australia | 8 | 20 | 4 | 2 | 2 | 77; DNF | 113 | 36 |
| 5 | Enrico Chieffi (H); Roberto Sinibaldi | Italy | 16 | 19 | 10 | 4 | 13 | 7 | 69 | 50 |
| 6 | Hans Vogt Jr. (H); Jörg Fricke | Germany | 5 | 10 | 8 | 25 | 22 | 6 | 76 | 51 |
| 7 | Michael Hestbæk (H); Martin Hejlsberg | Denmark | 42 | 2 | 77; PMS | 1 | 4 | 3 | 129 | 52 |
| 8 | Anastasios Boudouris (H); Dimitrios Boukis | Greece | 77; DNF | 3 | 29 | 15 | 7 | 4 | 135 | 58 |
| 9 | Ross MacDonald (H); Eric Jespersen | Canada | 1 | 13 | 1 | 22 | 77; DNF | 22 | 136 | 59 |
| 10 | Peter Bromby (H); Lee White | Bermuda | 6 | 5 | 14 | 13 | 21 | 77; DNF | 136 | 59 |
| 11 | Mats Johansson (H); Mattias Frode | Sweden | 24 | 9 | 25 | 10 | 8 | 10 | 86 | 61 |
| 12 | Vincent Brun (H); Mike Dorgan | United States | 27 | 18 | 15 | 14 | 5 | 13 | 92 | 65 |
| 13 | Roberto Benamati (H); Paolo Busolo | Italy | 70 | 4 | 6 | 23 | 25 | 11 | 139 | 69 |
| 14 | Benny Andersen (H); Karsten Svenningsen | Denmark | 53 | 15 | 5 | 11 | 31 | 8 | 123 | 70 |
| 15 | Frank Butzmann (H); Michael Umlauft | Germany | 10 | 12 | 34 | 9 | 6 | 77; DNF | 148 | 71 |
| 16 | Hubert Raudaschl (H); Andreas Hanakamp | Austria | 3 | 21 | 11 | 32 | 17 | 23 | 107 | 75 |
| 17 | Alexander Hagen (H); Jens Peters | Germany | 48 | 11 | 12 | 20 | 28 | 9 | 128 | 80 |
| 18 | Stephan Schurich (H); F. Xaver Gruber | Austria | 29 | 17 | 36 | 18 | 11 | 10; YMP | 121 | 85 |
| 19 | Ian Murray (H); Steve Jarvin | Australia | 36 | 43 | 18 | 6 | 14 | 16 | 133 | 90 |
| 20 | Richard Grönblom (H); Ville Kurki | Finland | 33 | 7 | 17 | 21 | 29 | 20 | 127 | 94 |
| 21 | Pietro D'Ali (H); Ferdinando Colaninno | Italy | 2 | 30 | 23 | 16 | 24 | 77; DNF | 172 | 95 |
| 22 | Sergey Khoretsky (H); Vladimir Zuev | Belarus | 14 | 35 | 7 | 77; DNF | 18 | 21 | 172 | 95 |
| 23 | Fernando Rita (H); Javier Aguado | Spain | 31 | 36 | 13 | 17 | 20 | 18 | 135 | 99 |
| 24 | Paolo Semeraro (H); Marco Marenco | Italy | 59 | 8 | 32 | 33 | 15 | 19 | 166 | 107 |
| 25 | Jose Doreste (H); Javier Hermida | Spain | 58 | 16 | 16 | 3 | 19 | 77; DNF | 189 | 112 |
| 26 | Rod Davis (H); Don Cowie | New Zealand | 21 | 29 | 21 | 27 | 16 | 77; DNF | 191 | 114 |
| 27 | Anders Lundmark (H); Fredrik Baeck | Sweden | 12 | 77; DNF | 22 | 30 | 33 | 17 | 191 | 114 |
| 28 | Lawrie Smith (H); C. Mason | Great Britain | 41 | 41 | 77; DNF | 12 | 10 | 12 | 193 | 116 |
| 29 | Mike Ilgenstein (H); Kai Falkenthal | Germany | 32 | 25 | 31 | 19 | 26 | 15 | 148 | 116 |
| 30 | Silvio Santoni (H); Sergio Lambertenghi | Italy | 25 | 28 | 28 | 24 | 23 | 77; DNF | 205 | 128 |
| 31 | Philip Graves (H); Barry van Leeuwen | Canada | 9 | 32 | 30 | 41 | 36 | 77; DNF | 225 | 148 |
| 32 | Hubt Merkelbach (H); Dirk Meissner | Germany | 65 | 45 | 19 | 60 | 27 | 14 | 230 | 165 |
| 33 | Hans Wallén (H); Bobby Lohse | Sweden | 23 | 14 | 27 | 26 | 77; DNF | 77; DNC | 244 | 167 |
| 34 | George Szabo III (H); Rick Peters | United States | 43 | 27 | 42 | 35 | 34 | 77; DNF | 258 | 181 |
| 35 | Andreas Dellwig (H); Lutz Boguhn | Germany | 37 | 24 | 57 | 31 | 37 | 77; DNC | 263 | 186 |
| 36 | Riccardo Simoneschi (H); Ermes Costa | Italy | 13 | 47 | 44 | 42 | 43 | 77; DNF | 266 | 189 |
| 37 | Eric Doyle (H); Brian Terhaar | United States | 77; DNF | 40 | 20 | 29 | 30 | 77; DNF | 273 | 196 |
| 38 | Joe Londrigan (H); Phil Trinter | United States | 15 | 34 | 37 | 43 | 77; DNF | 77; DNC | 283 | 206 |
| 39 | Antonio Turner (H); Jaime Tuner | Spain | 22 | 33 | 47 | 28 | 77; DNC | 77; DNC | 284 | 207 |
| 40 | Stuart Hudson (H); Mark Downer | Great Britain | 57 | 22 | 41 | 77; DNC | 12 | 77; DNC | 286 | 209 |
| 41 | Foss Miller (H); Garth Olsen | United States | 28 | 46 | 46 | 77; TLE | 32 | 77; DNC | 289 | 212 |
| 42 | Daniel Stegmeier (H); Beat Stegmeier | Switzerland | 55 | 51 | 39 | 34 | 38 | 77; DNF | 294 | 217 |
| 43 | Vasco Serpa (H); Mario De Sampaio | Portugal | 40 | 23 | 35 | 44 | 77; DNC | 77; DNC | 296 | 219 |
| 44 | Rex Bienz (H); Christian Rossing | Switzerland | 38 | 55 | 61 | 37 | 35 | 77; DNC | 303 | 226 |
| 45 | Halvor Schøyen (H); Petter Fjeld | Norway | 49 | 37 | 26 | 46 | 77; DNF | 77; DNC | 312 | 235 |
| 46 | Vince Graciotti (H); Corrado Cristaldini | Italy | 30 | 31 | 38 | 77; TLE | 77; DNC | 77; DNC | 313 | 236 |
| 47 | Volker Bernicken (H); Bernd Stoll | Germany | 34 | 42 | 24 | 77; TLE | 77; DNC | 77; DNC | 314 | 237 |
| 48 | Alberto La Tegola (H); Giovanni Di Cagno | Italy | 19 | 44 | 55 | 48 | 77; DNC | 77; DNC | 320 | 243 |
| 49 | Rainer Wilhelm (H); Wolfgang Krepcik | Austria | 45 | 60 | 54 | 49 | 42 | 77; DNC | 327 | 250 |
| 50 | Jens Olbrysch (H); Stefan Diestelmann | Netherlands | 11 | 50 | 77; DNF | 39 | 77; DNF | 77; DNC | 331 | 254 |
| 51 | Chuck Lewsadder (H); Scott Zimmer | United States | 18 | 66 | 33 | 77; TLE | 77; DNC | 77; DNC | 331 | 254 |
| 52 | Tibor Tenke (H); Zoltan Sass | Hungary | 67 | 54 | 60 | 40 | 39 | 77; DNC | 337 | 260 |
| 53 | Alberto Scapolo (H); Sergio Mulazzi | Italy | 56 | 36 | 45 | 47 | 77; DNC | 77; DNC | 338 | 261 |
| 54 | Glenn Read (H); Mike Hughes | Australia | 63 | 58 | 40 | 77; TLE | 41 | 77; DNC | 339 | 262 |
| 55 | Philip Baker (H); Philip R. Baker | Australia | 44 | 56 | 52 | 38 | 77; DNF | 77; DNC | 344 | 267 |
| 56 | Regi Schlubach (H); John Schubach | Germany | 66 | 64 | 62 | 36 | 40 | 77; DNC | 345 | 268 |
| 57 | Ingvar Krook (H); Thomas Jansson | Sweden | 17 | 53 | 77; DNF | 45 | 77; DNC | 77; DNC | 346 | 269 |
| 58 | Christoph Gautschi (H); Felix Meier | Switzerland | 46 | 52 | 43 | 53 | 77; DNC | 77; DNC | 348 | 271 |
| 59 | Andrea Folli (H); Massimo Canali | Italy | 26 | 59 | 58 | 77; DNF | 77; DNC | 77; DNC | 374 | 297 |
| 60 | Giampiero Poggi (H); Andrea Klein | Italy | 47 | 61 | 56 | 56 | 77; DNC | 77; DNC | 374 | 297 |
| 61 | Dewitt Morris (H); Tom Olsen | United States | 73 | 39 | 48 | 77; DNF | 77; DNC | 77; DNC | 391 | 314 |
| 62 | Numo Santo Silva (H); F.P. De Mello | Portugal | 50 | 63 | 50 | 77; DNF | 77; DNC | 77; DNC | 394 | 317 |
| 63 | Pelle Petterson (H); Peter Erzberger | Sweden | 64 | 77; PMS | 49 | 51 | 77; DNC | 77; DNC | 395 | 318 |
| 64 | Josef Urban (H); Martin Liebl | Austria | 39 | 49 | 77; DNC | 77; DNF | 77; DNC | 77; DNC | 396 | 319 |
| 65 | Fritz Girr (H); Burghard Majewski | Germany | 72 | 65 | 53 | 52 | 77; DNC | 77; DNC | 396 | 319 |
| 66 | J. Garcia-German (H); Diego Lainz | Spain | 52 | 77; DNF | 59 | 55 | 77; DNC | 77; DNC | 397 | 320 |
| 67 | Tom Londrigan (H); Eric Beckwith | United States | 60 | 62 | 77; DNC | 50 | 77; DNC | 77; DNC | 403 | 326 |
| 68 | Miguel Lopez (H); Juan Seghers | Spain | 62 | 57 | 77; DNF | 54 | 77; DNC | 77; DNC | 404 | 327 |
| 69 | Guram Biganishvili (H); Vladimir Gruzdev | Georgia | 54 | 48 | 77; DNF | 77; DNF | 77; DNC | 77; DNC | 410 | 333 |
| 70 | Karl Schrader (H); Ennio Montonati | Italy | 69 | 68 | 51 | 77; DNF | 77; DNC | 77; DNC | 419 | 342 |
| 71 | German Canosa (H); José Dominguez | Spain | 35 | 77; DNF | 77; DNC | 77; DNC | 77; DNC | 77; DNC | 420 | 343 |
| 72 | Harald Wirth (H); Armin Wiedergut | Austria | 68 | 67 | 63 | 77; DNF | 77; DNC | 77; DNC | 429 | 352 |
| 73 | Milos Laznicka (H); Martin Kvet | Czech Republic | 51 | 77; DNF | 77; DNC | 77; DNF | 77; DNC | 77; DNC | 436 | 359 |
| 74 | Jose M. Acebal (H); Daniel Seghers | Spain | 61 | 77; DNC | 77; DNC | 77; DNS | 77; DNC | 77; DNC | 446 | 369 |
| 75 | Al De Bareno (H); A. Lecumberri | Spain | 71 | 77; DNC | 77; DNC | 77; DNS | 77; DNC | 77; DNC | 456 | 379 |
| 76 | Mario Caprile (H); Ramon Bernar | Spain | 74 | 77; DNC | 77; DNC | 77; DNC | 77; DNC | 77; DNC | 459 | 382 |

Legend: DNC – Did not come to the starting area; DNF – Did not finish; PMS – Premature start; YMP – Yacht materially prejudiced;
