= 1996 Star World Championships =

The 1996 Star World Championships were held in Rio de Janeiro, Brazil between January 9 and 21, 1996. The hosting yacht club was Iate Clube do Rio de Janeiro.

== Results ==
Results of individual races
Pos	Crew	Country	I	II	III	IV	V	VI	Tot	Pts
Gold medal	Enrico Chieffi (H); Roberto Sinibaldi	Italy	62; PMS	2	4	7	1	3	79	17
Silver medal	Mark Reynolds (H); Hal Haenel	United States	4	3	17	1	6	5	36	19
Bronze medal	Torben Schmidt Grael (H); Marcelo Ferreira	Brazil	3	1	6	8	8	4	30	22
4	Paul Cayard (H); George Iverson	United States	7	8	5	3	2	10	35	25
5	Alan Adler (H); Rodrigo Meirleles	Brazil	2	12	7	4	3	12	40	28
6	Ross MacDonald (H); Eric Jespersen	Canada	11	13	8	2	7	1	42	29
7	Hans Wallén (H); Bobby Lohse	Sweden	9	7	2	5	11	8	42	31
8	Jose Doreste (H); Javier Hermida	Spain	12	10	1	17	5	11	56	39
9	Mats Johansson (H); Stefan Hemlin	Sweden	5	5	10	13	9	14	56	42
10	Frank Butzmann (H); Kai Falkenthal	Germany	8	15	12	6	31	6	78	47
11	Colin Beashel (H); David Giles	Australia	10	9	3	10	16	62; PMS	110	48
12	Joe Londrigan (H); Phil Trinter	United States	14	14	22	11	4	9	74	52
13	Roberto Benamati (H); Giuseppe Devoti	Italy	16	62; DNF	9	9	13	13	122	60
14	Peter Bromby (H); Lee White	Bermuda	1	17	11	20	26	18	93	67
15	Peter E. Siemsen (H); Pedro Camargo	Brazil	6	6	16	12	32	62; PMS	134	72
16	George Szabo III (H); Rick Peters	United States	20	16	16; YMP	16	19	7	94	74
17	Paolo Semeraro (H); Mario Marenco	Italy	17	11	19	62; DSQ	15	26	150	88
18	Enrico Passoni (H); Ermes Costa	Italy	19	21	15	19	22	62; PMS	158	96
19	Vincent Brun (H); Magnus Liljedahl	United States	62; DSQ	4	20	62; DNF	14	2	164	102
20	Foss Miller (H); Garth Olsen	United States	22	41	21	24	20	22	150	109
21	Jurg Ryffel (H); Cyrille Fullemann	Switzerland	15	33	37	14	29	25	153	113
22	Rob Maine III (H); Gary Applebaum	United States	33	19	23	18	35	24	152	117
23	Riccardo Simoneschi (H); Corrado Cristaldini	Italy	23	29	14	30	25	27	148	118
24	Urs Hunkeler (H); Markus Lauber	Switzerland	32	25	18	31	23	21	150	118
25	Richard Grönblom (H); Ville Kurki	Finland	26; YMP	28	34	32	21	17	158	124
26	John King (H); Wellington de Barros	Brazil	62; DNF	20	62; PMS	21	10	15	190	128
27	Anders Lundmark (H); Niklas Olsson	Sweden	21	22	33	41	44	11	172	133
28	Daniel Stegmeier (H); Beat Stegmeier	Switzerland	28	23	27	29	50	28	185	135
29	Gastao Brun (H); Ricardo Nunes Ermel	Brazil	26	30	24	25	38	62; PMS	205	143
30	Pietro D'Ali (H); Ferdinando Colaninno	Italy	35	62; DND	59; YMP	23	18	20	217	155
31	Philip Graves (H); Kai Bjorn	Canada	25	31	62; PMS	22	17	62; DNS	219	157
32	Augusto Barrozo (H); Paulo Fabriani	Brazil	18	42	62; DSQ	34	37	31	224	162
33	Peter King (H); Andre Lekszycki	Brazil	37	35	29	33	28	62; PMS	224	162
34	Peter Moeckl (H); Christian Nehammer	Germany	33	39	26	44	24	35	201	163
35	Anastasios Boudouris (H); Dimitrios Boukis	Greece	13	62; DND	62; DSQ	15	12	62; DNF	226	164
36	Jorge Zarif (H); Guilherme De Almeida	Brazil	31	18	62; PMS	27	27	62; DNF	227	165
37	Daniel A. Wilcox (H); Silvio De Luca	Brazil	29	62; DNF	13	28	24	62; PMS	230	168
38	Christoph Gautschi (H); Kurt Freuis	Switzerland	38	32	42	37	45	19	213	168
39	Diogo Cayolla (H); Miguel Costa	Portugal	27	37	35	35	47	62; RET	243	181
40	Alberto Zanetti (H); Alejandro Colla	Argentina	30	26	62; PMS	62; DNF	41	23	244	182
41	Dieter Schön (H); Thomas Auracher	Germany	62; PMS	27	25	43	55	32	245	183
42	Alberto La Tegola (H); Giovanni Di Cagno	Italy	35	46	32	42	40	33	228	183
43	Rainer Wilhelm (H); Scott Zimmer	Austria	40	47	40	40	30	34	231	184
44	Jose Dias (H); Arnaldo Coochi	Brazil	24	38	38	46	43	62; PMS	249	187
45	Regi Schlubach (H); John Schlubach	Germany	47	24	38	45	51	38	243	190
46	Rainer R. Roellenbleg (H); Jörg Fricke	Germany	62; DNF	36	62; DNF	26	39	29	254	192
47	Davide Degennaro (H); Segrio Lambertenghi	Italy	46	44	44	36	48	30	248	200
48	Rolf Beck (H); Jurgen Eiermann	Netherlands	45	62; DNF	30	39	46	42	264	202
49	Ingvar Krook (H); Hugo Oljemark	Sweden	41	43	31	62; DSQ	33	62; PMS	272	210
50	Urs Ryffel (H); Markus Thomet	Switzerland	44	45	41	38	42	62; PMS	272	210
51	Rudi Houdek (H); Wolfgang Rappel	Germany	40	40	28	48	62; DNC	40	275	213
52	Alfred Weber (H); Harry Hoeferer	Austria	34	49	62; DNF	51	54	39	289	227
53	Gerhard Meyer (H); Ronald Seifert	Brazil	42	48	39	57	60	44	290	230
54	Peter D. Siemsen (H); Andre Mirsky	Brazil	43	52	48	54	53	37	287	231
55	Paulo Duarte (H); Luis Amaro	Brazil	48; YMP	50	43	49	58	41	289	231
56	Dierk Thomsen (H); Jorge B. de Mattos	Germany	49	62; DNF	45	52	52	38	298	236
57	Alessandro Pascolato (H); Nelson Falcao	Brazil	62; PMS	34	62; RET	47	38	62; PMS	303	241
58	Antonio Tamburini (H); Giambatista Giacchetti	Italy	50	53	48	50	59	45	305	246
59	Harald Wirth (H); Paul Samonig	Austria	48	51	47	53	49	62; DNF	310	248
60	Harry W. Walker (H); Juan Pablo Engelhard	United States	51	62; DNF	50	56	57	43	319	257
61	Chris Reckmann (H); Markus Schmid	Switzerland	52	62; DNF	49	55	58	46	320	258

Legend: DNC – Did not come to the starting area; DNF – Did not finish; DNS – Did not start; DSQ – Disqualified; PMS – Premature start; RET – Retired; YMP – Yacht materially prejudiced;
