= 1989 Star World Championships =

International sailing competition

The 1989 Star World Championships were held in Porto Cervo, Italy in 1989.

== Results ==
Results of individual races
Pos	Boat name	Crew	Country	I	II	III	IV	V	VI	Pts
Gold medal	Era Ora	Alan Adler (H); Nelson Falcão	Brazil	DNF	5	3	1	3	YMP	43.4
Silver medal		Werner Fritz (H); Ulrich Seeberger	West Germany	5	41	7	17	5	4	64.0
Bronze medal	C-Ya	Ross MacDonald (H); Bruce MacDonald	Canada	3	19	10	2	9	36	64.7
4		Mark Reynolds (H); Hal Haenel	United States	6	7	2	36	16	15	70.7
5		Vincent Hoesch (H); Robert Stark	West Germany	13	3	34	28	10	5	84.7
6	Dollar Limpo	Andrew Menkart (H); Peter Erzberger	United States	DNF	9	8	8	20	11	86.0
7	Tine	Hubert Raudaschl (H); Stefan Puxkandl	Austria	9	6	DNF	3	21	23	88.4
8		Anders Geert Jensen (H); Mogens Just Mikkelsen	Denmark	1	20	40	12	28	6	89.7
9		Giorgio Gorla (H); Alfio Peraboni	Italy	31	21	22	10	12	3	94.7
10	Mistral	Paul Cayard (H); Steve Erickson	United States	2	30	PMS	14	15	9	95.0
11		Johansson (H); Stefan Hemlin	Sweden	20	PMS	14	26	1	16	100.0
12	Far Niente	Vicente Brun (H); Joel Kew	United States	10	27	17	6	33	18	107.7
13	Innocent Erendira	Ed Adams (H); Rick Hennig	United States	34	13	15	33	5	14	113.0
14	Gnegen	Roberto Ferrarese (H); Giorgio Argenti	Italy	40	55	13	4	4	27	114.0
15		Stephen G. Gould (H); Greg Sieck	United States	16	25	20	9	14	DNF	114.0
16		Hans Wallén (H); Stephan Kallin	Sweden	PMS	12	42	5	7	26	121.0
17	Sekret	Viktor Soloviev (H); Aleksandr Zybin	Soviet Union	7	DNF	30	25	13	19	124.0
18	Vida Bandida	Torben Grael (H); Marcelo Ferreira	Brazil	37	32	1	62	38	1	125.0
19	Is Was	Hans Vogt Jr. (H); Scheibmeier	West Germany	28	51	26	13	26	12	135.0
20	De Stijl	Vince Locatelli (H); Daniele Bresciano	Italy	12	26	16	22	37	30	136.0
21	Rato Veloz	Gastão Brun (H); Christoph Bergmann	Brazil	73	15	4	7	PMS	10	137.0
22	Romeo	Josef Steinmayer (H); Reto Heilig	Switzerland	18	18	12	45	DNF	21	144.0
23		Joachim Hellmich (H); Martin Nixdorf	West Germany	22	29	6	40	31	29	146.7
24	Moira	Uwe von Below (H); Franz Wehofsich	West Germany	11	59	21	11	46	38	157.0
25		Joe Londrigan (H); Mark Busch	United States	19	47	DNF	43	17	8	164.0
26		Rita (H); Rita	Spain	14	38	29	61	18	35	164.0
27	Mancha Negra	Peter E. Siemsen (H); Camilo Carvalho	Brazil	15	DNF	PMS	20	2	2	165.0
28		Peter Peet (H); Dolf Peet	United States	4	PMS	9	55	45	31	172.0
29	Lella-St Constancia	Luca A. Pascolato (H); Sinclair	Brazil	42	PMS	25	58	6	22	152.7
30	Westwind	Roberto Benamati (H); Andrea Veggetti	Italy	25	17	PMS	73	27	13	185.0
31	Cocolocco	Moeckl (H); Schmid	West Germany	63	34	YMP	37	23	33	188.8
32	Tata	Albino Fravezzi (H); Giuseppe Devoti	Italy	PMS	DSQ	19	18	11	7	191.0
33	Agor XIII	Randazzo (H); Cristaldini	Italy	39	62	18	42	22	43	194.0
34	Chorao	Pedro Bulhoes (H); Garcia	Brazil	23	48	45	47	43	17	205.0
35	Keep Smiling	Patrick Haegeli (H); Xavier Rohart	France	27	50	35	16	48	DNF	206.0
36	Shrew	William Parks (H); Londrigan	United States	51	1	57	29	PMS	46	207.0
37		Antolini Ossi (H); Cuccotti	Italy	44	34	38	31	56	52	209.0
38	Hakuna Matata	Doug Smith (H); Marty Dalton	United States	85	43	32	56	19	32	212.0
39	Tina	Hunkeler (H); Leseck	Switzerland	32	52	49	27	42	34	214.0
40	Dopio Ti	Percossi (H); Calegari	Argentina	8	39	60	34	57	47	215.0
41	Serman	Paolo Semeraro (H); Lambertenghi	Italy	24	49	DNF	35	40	44	222.0
42	Fram	Gautschi (H); Muller-Crepon	West Germany	80	24	53	24	41	53	225.0
43	Nate	Pieper (H); Waechter	Austria	49	16	DNS	65	25	42	227.0
44	Cantabria	Alejandro Abascal (H); Javier Hermida	Spain	DSQ	25	23	21	24	28	232.0
45	Adrenalin	Richard Grönblom (H); Rauhala	Finland	50	11	47	49	47	49	233.0
46	Blacky	Jochen Schwarz (H); Dieter Wuerdig	West Germany	70	YMP	28	54	39	56	251.3
47	Grace	Greenwood (H); Paris	Great Britain	PMS	42	27	53	52	50	254.0
48	Haeschen	Reiner Haase (H); Borowy	Netherlands	67	58	33	59	36	39	255.0
49	Scrogneneu	Fauroux (H); Pascalini	France	59	46	39	69	30	55	259.0
50		Miller (H); Miller	United States	45	4	PMS	30	51	DNF	264.0
51	Bettan	Ingvar Bengtson (H); Fredrik Werner	Sweden	47	PMS	31	64	73	20	265.0
52	Marathon	M. van Leeuwen (H); P. Vollebregt	Netherlands	52	64	PMS	48	35	37	266.0
53	Dumbo	Peter-Alexander Wacker (H); Sten Risom	West Germany	64	54	37	39	54	DNF	278.0
54	Era Fado	Patrick de Barros (H); Henrique Anjos	Portugal	77	PMS	44	41	53	40	255.0
55		Alexander Hagen (H); Fritz Girr	West Germany	21	PMS	5	19	PMS	DNS	286.0
56	Dollar Pesto	Peter Erzberger (H); Vaile	Great Britain	46	61	55	50	44	DNF	286.0
57	Penelope	Peter U. Wyss (H); Urs Joss	Switzerland	DNF	35	DNF	44	29	48	292.0
58	Crazy Horse	Beck (H); Meissner	Netherlands	41	DNF	46	57	64	54	292.0
59	Lump	Stefan Vogt (H); Carlo Loos	West Germany	75	23	36	70	63	DNF	297.0
60	Shorebreak	Kim Fletcher (H); William Kreysler	United States	43	PMS	61	60	49	57	300.0
61	Le Baron	Luigi Monaco (H); Giancarlo Squintani	Italy	79	2	51	88	55	DNF	300.0
62	Jani-Kuka	Juan Costas (H); Boni Bejar	Spain	26	PMS	11	PMS	PMS	25	304.0
63	Double Dutch	Ben Staartjes (H); Rob Douze	Netherlands	82	78	56	32	34	DNF	312.0
64	Old Fox	Bruni (H); Caldarella	Italy	61	53	54	96	59	59	316.0
65	Buff	Schulte (H); Schulte	West Germany	68	22	63	66	DNF	67	316.0
66	Orbis II	Schaedla (H); Klippert	West Germany	PMS	33	68	52	79	60	322.0
67	Nidhoegg	Schröder (H); Stefan Sundquist	Sweden	29	PMS	50	81	32	DNF	328.0
68	Paragon	Peter Wright (H); Greg Cook	United States	35	36	DNF	15	DNC	DNC	328.0
69	Simba	Maurer (H); Scheidegger	Switzerland	48	63	PMS	86	60	45	333.0
70	Serena	Ric. Simoneschi (H); Salani	Italy	17	DNF	PMS	DNF	50	24	333.0
71		Migliaccio (H); Menoni	Italy	60	70	41	38	DNF	DNC	315.0
72	I-Form	Fritjofsson (H); Nilsson	Sweden	62	10	PMS	80	58	DNF	346.0
73	Marianne	Beek (H); Oggioni	United States	55	44	64	PMS	61	DNF	360.0
74		Gunnar Dahl (H); Korlin	Sweden	72	PMS	52	76	65	64	362.0
75	Lariofam	Mario Caprile (H); Folli	Spain	54	76	67	54	70	65	362.0
76	Kruzituerkn	W. Kersten (H); Wagner	West Germany	91	PMS	71	46	67	55	363.0
77	Piazzawa VI	Vang-Mathisen (H); Bruni	Switzerland	88	68	DNF	63	65	51	365.0
78	Arbre du Tenere	Janz (H); Hartmann	West Germany	78	81	43	93	71	62	365.0
79	Bingo VII	Harry W. Walker (H); John Terrell	United States	71	65	65	85	72	63	366.0
80	Ali Baba	Navy (H); Novak	France	33	77	24	DNF	DNC	DNC	376.0
81	Egli	Merkelbach (H); Mueller	West Germany	36	DNF	48	51	DNC	DNC	377.0
82	PA 2	Fioroni (H); Gilardoni	Italy	DNF	40	59	74	69	DNC	318.0
83	Violence	Wirth (H); Gratzer	Austria	86	57	66	82	77	66	378.0
84	Top Gun	David Cornes (H); Gross	United States	56	PMS	PMS	77	62	61	392.0
85	Eunice III	Canali (H); Canali	Italy	35	73	DNF	79	66	DNF	392.0
86	Kjappfot	Bjordal (H); Bjelke	Norway	65	45	55	92	DNC	DNC	396.0
87	Arlecchino	Ryffel (H); Thomet	Switzerland	59	66	PMS	67	DNF	41	399.0
88		Dolfei (H); Lindholm	Sweden	30	PMS	PMS	23	DNC	DNC	401.0
89	Andemat	Cereda (H); Annoni	Italy	53	75	72	95	80	DNF	405.0
90	Trident	Cyrill Dvorak (H); Elsener	West Germany	58	56	DNF	71	DNC	DNF	421.0
91		Albino Fravezzi (H); Rubini	Italy	DNC	8	PMS	72	DNC	DNC	428.0
92	Rhum	Santo (H); Santo, Jr.	Portugal	87	71	62	75	DNC	DNC	431.0
93	Gigolette	Sigoli (H); Loda	Italy	DNF	79	70	DNF	75	68	434.0
94	Tiramsu	Rainer Klostermann (H); Hanspeter Kistler	Switzerland	74	74	69	91	DNF	DNC	444.0
95	Via Domani II	Joseph Pro (H); Daniele Gini	United States	DNF	67	DSQ	78	75	DNF	452.0
96		Antonio Cosentino (H); Leonetti	Italy	57	PMS	DNF	78	75	DNF	452.0
97	Champagne	Lanfranchi (H); Mattiello	Italy	66	60	DNF	90	DNF	DNC	458.0
98		Flavio Scala (H); Alberto Rossari	Italy	81	31	PMS	DNF	DNC	DNC	460.0
99	Boerschi	Gerd Neumann (H); Urbach	West Germany	53	50	DNF	94	76	DNF	469.0
100	Elile X	Grirani (H); Capozzi	Italy	DNF	37	DNF	57	DNC	DNC	472.0
101	Geraldine	Castelli (H); Polti	Italy	54	YMP	YMP	53	DNC	DNC	485.0
102	La Niña	Lopez Jimenez (H); Augusto Sanguinetti	Spain	90	72	PMS	59	DNC	DNC	493.0
103		Sami Mykkänen (H); Ivenson	Finland	DSQ	69	DNF	DNC	DNC	DNC	523.0
104	Adamaria	Bottagisio (H); Ottone	Italy	69	PMS	DNF	PMS	DNC	DNC	523.0
105	Mari	Josef Urban (H); Urban Schulz	Austria	76	DSQ	PMS	DNC	DNC	DNC	530.0

Legend: DNC – Did not come to the starting area; DNF – Did not finish; DNS – Did not start; DSQ – Disqualified; PMS – Premature start; YMP – Yacht materially prejudiced;
