= 1998 Star World Championships =

The 1994 Star World Championships were held in Portorož, Slovenia between September 13 and 18, 1998.

== Results ==
Results of individual races
Pos	Crew	Country	I	II	III	IV	V	VI	Tot	Pts
Gold medal	Colin Beashel (H); David Giles	Australia	5	2	8	3	4	98; DNF	120	22
Silver medal	Torben Schmidt Grael (H); Marcelo Ferreira	Brazil	11	3	18	5	1	3	41	23
Bronze medal	Alexander Hagen (H); Thorsten Helmert	Germany	8	5	6	12	15	47	93	46
4	Mats Johansson (H); Leif Möller	Sweden	12	4	7	17	33	6	79	46
5	Vincent Hoesch (H); Florian Fendt	Germany	4	15	1	19	46	17; RDG	102	56
6	José Maria van der Ploeg (H); Javier Hermida	Spain	98; OCS	11	12	18	5	11	155	57
7	Frank Butzmann (H); Jens Peters	Germany	16	9	30	25	3	8	91	61
8	Reinhard Schmidt (H); Jochen Wolfram	Germany	2	30	45	14	14	2	107	62
9	Ross MacDonald (H); Kai Bjorn	Canada	1	98; OCS	2	4	8	49	162	64
10	Peter Vessella (H); Mike Dorgan	United States	38	7	15	6	2	61	129	68
11	Pietro D'Alì (H); Roberto Sinibaldi	Italy	98; OCS	35	22	10	12	1	178	80
12	Mark Neeleman (H); Jos Schrier	Netherlands	10	98; OCS	24	1	34	12	179	81
13	Silvio Santoni (H); Ferdinando Colaninno	Italy	15	27	5	9	50	27	133	83
14	Olle Johansson (H); Martin Abenius	Sweden	6	10	26	29	21	98; DSQ	190	92
15	Vincent Brun (H); Rodrigo Meirleles	United States	20	6	19	26	24	98; DNF	193	95
16	Peter Bromby (H); Lee White	Bermuda	32	22; RDG	25	11	37	7	112	97
17	Luca Modena (H); Giuseppe Devoti	Italy	17	18	41	15	9	98; DSQ	198	100
18	Glyn Charles (H); Mark Covell	Great Britain	22	22	20	8	30	37	139	102
19	Hubert Raudaschl (H); Gerd Matuschek	Austria	3	36	23	21	57	21	161	104
20	John A. MacCausland (H); Phil Trinter	United States	98; OCS	31	14	20	6	35	204	106
21	Howard Shiebler (H); Rick Peters	United States	21	1	11	41	55	33	162	107
22	Roberto Benamati (H); Luca Maffezzoli	Italy	44	24	21	7	16	39	151	107
23	John King (H); Guilharme Almeida	Brazil	27	28	33	24	63	9	184	121
24	Mark Reynolds (H); Magnus Liljedahl	United States	13	98; OCS	4	2	45	63	225	127
25	Rob Douze (H); Vincent Geysen	Netherlands	36	20	10	39	60	23	188	128
26	Stuart Hudson (H); Chris Gowers	Great Britain	9	19	52	30	48	24	182	130
27	Christian Scheinecker (H); Robert Steinkogler	Austria	30	33	13	43	40	19	178	135
28	Markus Reger (H); Marcus Becker	Germany	14	38	53	33	64	10	212	148
29	Mitja Kosmina (H); Evgenij Komianec	Slovenia	49	45	98; DNF	23	10	22	247	149
30	Urs Hunkeler (H); Jurg Schneider	Switzerland	42	13	29	72	52	18	226	154
31	Thomas Jungblut (H); Gerrit Bartel	Germany	46	21	59	34	25	28	213	154
32	Riccardo Simoneschi (H); Corrado Cristaldini	Italy	60	65	16	27	41	13	222	157
33	Cuyler Morris (H); Doug Brophy	United States	56	8	28	48	17	98; DNF	255	157
34	Eric Doyle (H); Brian Terhaar	United States	98; OCS	25	9	16	81	30	259	161
35	Daniel Stegmeier (H); Beat Stegmeier	Switzerland	58	14	47	44	13	51	227	169
36	Eizens Cepurnieks (H); Aleksey Rostchin	Latvia	19	56	37	61	79	17	269	190
37	Marin Lovrovic Jr. (H); Marin Lovrovic Sr.	Croatia	43	47	66	70	11	25	262	192
38	Sergey Khoretsky (H); Horst Seitz	Belarus	34	44	50	49	66	20	263	197
39	Josef Urban (H); Christian Nehammer	Austria	35	55	58	56	19	32	255	197
40	James A. Freeman (H); Chris Rogers	United States	50	12	56	55	42	38	253	197
41	Giulio Gatti (H); Ermes Costa	Italy	25	75	61	50	22	40	273	198
42	Mathias Dahlman (H); Claus Gerkman	Finland	23	68	43	60	23	55	272	204
43	Ingvar Krook (H); Thomas Jansson	Sweden	33	43	65	40	28	60	269	204
44	Rainer R. Roellenbleg (H); Mario Salani	Germany	98; OCS	64	39	53	7	46	307	209
45	Jurg Ryffel (H); Roland Kniel	Switzerland	7	63	44	71	39	56	280	209
46	Giampiero Poggi (H); Manuele La Porta	Italy	39	34	62	28	58	52	273	211
47	Peter van Veen (H); Ab Ekels	Netherlands	45	98; OCS	32	52	80	4	311	213
48	Gerald Kershbaumer (H); Helmuth Mosheimer	Austria	24	62	84	68	44	16	298	214
49	Vince Graciotti (H); Igor Kaptourovitch	Italy	18	73	40	32	53	98; DNF	314	216
50	Hubt Merkelbach (H); Dirk Meissner	Germany	98; OCS	50	38	51	72	5	314	216
51	Glenn Tucker (H); Mike Hughes	Australia	31	98; OCS	17	36	71	62	315	217
52	Carlo Loos (H); Thomas Chromecek	Germany	29	46	82	35	62	50	304	222
53	Carl Schröder (H); Peter Ebel	Sweden	41	17	57	58	54	98; DNF	325	227
54	Luca Simeone (H); Mauro Riccieri	Italy	98; OCS	41	35	31	65	59	329	231
55	Volker Bernicken (H); Sebastian Dentler	Germany	51	26	67	98; DNF	59	31	332	234
56	Roeland Wentholt (H); Joost Houweling	Netherlands	59	61	36	62	18	98; DNF	334	236
57	Leif Carlsson (H); Nilkas Olsson	Sweden	28	23	64	98; DNF	27	98; DNS	338	240
58	Marc A. Pickel (H); Thomas Auracher	Germany	98; OCS	98; OCS	3	22	26	98; DNF	345	247
59	Tibor Tenke (H); Jozsef Bendicsek	Hungary	98; OCS	69	27	59	89	14	356	258
60	Benny Andersen (H); Karsten Svenningsen	Denmark	98; OCS	16	34	37	74	98; DNF	357	259
61	Alberto Zanetti (H); Juan Pablo Engelhard	Argentina	98; OCS	98; OCS	31	38	51	42	358	260
62	Juan Percossi (H); Oscar Gabriel Meyer	Argentina	40	76	51	73	67	29	336	260
63	Kim Fletcher (H); Scott Zimmer	United States	64	54	68	67	43	36	332	264
64	Antonio Tamburini (H); Renzo Ricci	Italy	67	51	71	46	91	34	360	269
65	Christoph Gautschi (H); Kurt Freuis	Switzerland	74	42	54	54	84	45	353	269
66	Regi Schlubach (H); John Schlubach	Germany	63; RDG	57	49	80	29	98; DNF	376	278
67	Manuel Modena (H); Giorgio Montresor	Italy	61	77	75	47	47	48	355	278
68	Andrea Veggetti (H); Franco Coppo	Italy	98; OCS	32	42	42	68	98; DNS	380	282
69	Larry Whipple (H); Barry van Leeuwen	United States	98; OCS	29	48	13	98; DNF	98; DNS	384	286
70	Carlo Falcone (H); Shannon Falcone	Netherlands Antilles	63	70	78	76	20	58	365	287
71	Martin Ingold (H); Erika Ingold	Switzerland	73	53	87	82	31	53	379	292
72	Albert Sturm (H); Peter Moeckl	Austria	57	98; OCS	46	65	32	98; DNS	396	298
73	Andreas Hermann (H); Nils Hollweg	Germany	37	49	60	64	98; DNF	98; DNF	406	308
74	Sune Carlsson (H); Benny Nilsson	Sweden	54	72	73	75	36	98; DNS	408	310
75	Gerhard Meyer (H); Ronald Seifert	Brazil	55	87	83	74	78	26	403	316
76	Donald McLean (H); John Gleed	Cayman Islands	77	80	72	98; DNF	49	41	417	319
77	Davide Degennaro (H); Sergio Lambertenghi	Spain	47	37	55	98; DSQ	86	98; DNS	421	323
78	Philippe Battaglia (H); David Lajoux	Monaco	26	83	63	83	70	98; DNS	423	325
79	Thomas Lyckåsen (H); Tomas Johanson	Sweden	98; OCS	40	81	69	38	98; DNS	424	326
80	Rob Niemczewski (H); Michael Umlauft	Germany	48	48	98; DNS	98; DNS	35	98; DNS	425	327
81	Renato Irrera (H); Alessandro Caldarella	Italy	98; OCS	81	86	45	76	43	429	331
82	Hans Otto Engel (H); Andreas Engel	Germany	52	39	70	98; DNS	75	98; DNS	432	334
83	Mariano Lucca (H); Sergio Bonelli	Argentina	98; OCS	86	76	98; DNS	61	15	434	336
84	Daniel Wyss (H); Jurg Walter	Switzerland	66	71	77	78	85	44	421	336
85	Mario Caprile (H); Federico Medolago	Spain	72	52	90	81	83	54	432	342
86	Hermann Weiler (H); Klaus Breitlow	Germany	76	58	85	77	82	57	435	350
87	Harry W. Walker (H); Cicio Canali	United States	53	85	74	63	87	98; DNS	460	362
88	Sergii Shevchenko (H); Olexandr Maslo	Ukraine	69	82	94	98; DNF	56	64	463	365
89	Pelle Petterson (H); Peter Erzberger	Sweden	71	98; OCS	69	57	73	98; DNS	466	368
90	Hans H. Geim (H); E. G. Oeser	Germany	65	60	89	79	88	98; DNS	479	381
91	Albert Sporer (H); Heinz P. Nersinger	Germany	70	66	88	84	77	98; DNS	483	385
92	Ed Sprague Jr. (H); Kyle Henehan	United States	75	59	91	98; DNS	69	98; DNS	490	392
93	Josef Steinmayer (H); Dieter Ertl	Switzerland	98; OCS	67	79	66	92	98; DNS	500	402
94	Felice Bortolo (H); Ivano Petoletti	Italy	62	74	80	98; DNS	90	98; DNS	502	404
95	Claude Bonanni (H); Arthur Anosov	United States	68	79	98; DNS	98; DNS	98; DNS	98; DNS	539	441
96	Franco Dazzi (H); Muzio Scacciati	Italy	98; OCS	78	92	98; DNS	98; DNC	98; DNC	562	464
97	Igor Sterba (H); Jiri Tancer	Czech Republic	98; OCS	84	93	98; DNS	98; DNS	98; DNS	569	471

Legend: DNC – Did not come to the starting area; DNF – Did not finish; DNS – Did not start; DSQ – Disqualified; OCS – On the course side of the starting line; RDG – Redress given;
