= Sailing at the 1996 Summer Olympics – Star =

Star at the Games of the XXVI Olympiad
- Star
- Venue: Savannah
- Dates: 22 to 29 July
- Competitors: 50 from 25 nations
- Teams: 25

Medalists
1st place, gold medalist(s)		Torben Grael; Marcelo Ferreira	Brazil
2nd place, silver medalist(s)		Hans Wallén; Bobby Lohse	Sweden
3rd place, bronze medalist(s)		Colin Beashel; David Giles	Australia

The Star Competition was a sailing event on the program at the 1996 Summer Olympics that was held from 22 to 29 July 1996 in Savannah, Georgia, United States. Points were awarded for placement in each race. Eleven races were scheduled. Ten were sailed. Each team had two discards.

== Results ==
Rank	Helmsman (Country)	Crew	Race I		Race II		Race III		Race IV		Race V		Race VI		Race VII		Race VIII		Race IX		Race X		Total Points	Total -1
Rank	Helmsman (Country)	Crew	Rank	Points	Rank	Points	Rank	Points	Rank	Points	Rank	Points	Rank	Points	Rank	Points	Rank	Points	Rank	Points	Rank	Points	Total Points	Total -1
1st place, gold medalist(s)	Torben Grael (BRA)	Marcelo Ferreira	1	1.0	6	6.0	2	2.0	~~7~~	~~7.0~~	1	1.0	4	4.0	~~9~~	~~9.0~~	2	2.0	6	6.0	3	3.0	41.0	25.0
2nd place, silver medalist(s)	Hans Wallén (SWE)	Bobby Lohse	4	4.0	7	7.0	7	7.0	~~8~~	~~8.0~~	2	2.0	1	1.0	3	3.0	4	4.0	~~8~~	~~8.0~~	1	1.0	45.0	29.0
3rd place, bronze medalist(s)	Colin Beashel (AUS)	David Giles	~~11~~	~~11.0~~	1	1.0	1	1.0	1	1.0	8	8.0	3	3.0	2	2.0	7	7.0	9	9.0	~~PMS~~	~~26.0~~	69.0	32.0
4	Anastasios Bountouris (GRE)	Dimitrios Boukis	6	6.0	8	8.0	~~14~~	~~14.0~~	3	3.0	6	6.0	6	6.0	1	1.0	~~16~~	~~16.0~~	4	4.0	11	11.0	75.0	45.0
5	Rod Davis (NZL)	Don Cowie	2	2.0	4	4.0	~~17~~	~~17.0~~	~~11~~	~~11.0~~	10	10.0	9	9.0	4	4.0	6	6.0	1	1.0	10	10.0	74.0	46.0
6	Enrico Chieffi (ITA)	Roberto Sinibaldi	~~15~~	~~15.0~~	3	3.0	6	6.0	6	6.0	3	3.0	2	2.0	5	5.0	13	13.0	14	14.0	~~PMS~~	~~26.0~~	93.0	52.0
7	José Doreste (ESP)	Javier Hermida	5	5.0	5	5.0	11	11.0	13	13.0	9	9.0	11	11.0	~~PMS~~	~~26.0~~	1	1.0	~~15~~	~~15.0~~	2	2.0	98.0	57.0
8	Mark Reynolds (USA)	Hal Haenel	3	3.0	2	2.0	5	5.0	5	5.0	5	5.0	~~21~~	~~21.0~~	15	15.0	~~22~~	~~22.0~~	18	18.0	5	5.0	101.0	58.0
9	Michael Hestbæk (DEN)	Martin Hejlsberg	7	7.0	9	9.0	8	8.0	2	2.0	12	12.0	10	10.0	6	6.0	10	10.0	~~12~~	~~12.0~~	~~13~~	~~13.0~~	89.0	64.0
10	Frank Butzmann (GER)	Kai Falkenthal	8	8.0	13	13.0	4	4.0	4	4.0	~~17~~	~~17.0~~	12	12.0	8	8.0	~~15~~	~~15.0~~	2	2.0	15	15.0	98.0	66.0
11	Glyn Charles (GBR)	George Skuodas	~~14~~	~~14.0~~	14	14.0	10	10.0	17	17.0	4	4.0	7	7.0	7	7.0	3	3.0	~~16~~	~~16.0~~	9	9.0	101.0	68.0
12	Mark Mansfield (IRL)	David Burrows	~~22~~	~~22.0~~	~~PMS~~	~~26.0~~	12	12.0	9	9.0	16	16.0	13	13.0	10	10.0	8	8.0	3	3.0	4	4.0	123.0	75.0
13	Peter Bromby (BER)	Lee White	9	9.0	~~20~~	~~20.0~~	9	9.0	10	10.0	11	11.0	~~19~~	~~19.0~~	14	14.0	11	11.0	11	11.0	6	6.0	120.0	81.0
14	Ross MacDonald (CAN)	Eric Jespersen	~~DSQ~~	~~26.0~~	~~PMS~~	~~26.0~~	3	3.0	18	18.0	7	7.0	8	8.0	11	11.0	5	5.0	23	23.0	7	7.0	134.0	82.0
15	Hubert Raudaschl (AUT)	Andreas Hanakamp	12	12.0	12	12.0	13	13.0	~~19~~	~~19.0~~	13	13.0	5	5.0	13	13.0	~~20~~	~~20.0~~	13	13.0	8	8.0	128.0	89.0
16	Guram Biganishvili (GEO)	Vladimer Gruzdevi	13	13.0	10	10.0	22	22.0	14	14.0	~~23~~	~~23.0~~	~~24~~	~~24.0~~	21	21.0	9	9.0	5	5.0	18	18.0	159.0	112.0
17	Viktor Solovyov (RUS)	Anatoly Mikhaylin	10	10.0	16	16.0	~~21~~	~~21.0~~	~~DNF~~	~~26.0~~	14	14.0	15	15.0	19	19.0	19	19.0	7	7.0	21	21.0	168.0	121.0
18	Csaba Haranghy (HUN)	András Komm	~~21~~	~~21.~~0	18	18.0	20	20.0	16	16.0	~~20~~	~~20.0~~	17	17.0	17	17.0	14	14.0	10	10.0	16	16.0	169.0	128.0
19	Mark Holowesko (BAH)	Myles Pritchard	~~20~~	~~20.0~~	11	11.0	15	15.0	20	20.0	21	21.0	18	18.0	12	12.0	~~23~~	~~23.0~~	20	20.0	12	12.0	172.0	128.0
20	Richard Grönblom (FIN)	Ville Kurki	16	16.0	~~19~~	~~19.0~~	18	18.0	12	12.0	15	15.0	16	16.0	16	16.0	~~DNF~~	~~26.0~~	17	17.0	19	19.0	174.0	129.0
21	Diogo Cayolla (POR)	Miguel Costa	19	19.0	15	15.0	16	16.0	15	15.0	18	18.0	14	14.0	~~20~~	~~20.0~~	18	18.0	~~21~~	~~21.~~0	14	14.0	170.0	129.0
22	Guillermo Calegari Jr. (ARG)	Mauro Maiola	17	17.0	17	17.0	~~23~~	~~23.0~~	~~22~~	~~22.0~~	19	19.0	22	22.0	18	18.0	17	17.0	19	19.0	17	17.0	191.0	146.0
23	Sergey Khoretsky (BLR)	Vladimir Zuyev	18	18.0	21	21.0	19	19.0	21	21.0	~~22~~	~~22.0~~	20	20.0	~~22~~	~~22.0~~	21	21.0	22	22.0	20	20.0	206.0	162.0
24	Robert Lowrance (ASA)	Fua Logo Tavui	23	23.0	23	23.0	~~DNF~~	~~26.0~~	24	24.0	~~25~~	~~25.0~~	25	25.0	23	23.0	12	12.0	25	25.0	22	22.0	228.0	177.0
25	Donald McLean (CAY)	Carson Ebanks	~~24~~	~~24.0~~	22	22.0	24	24.0	23	23.0	24	24.0	23	23.0	~~PMS~~	~~26.0~~	24	24.0	24	24.0	23	23.0	237.0	187.0

=== Daily standings ===
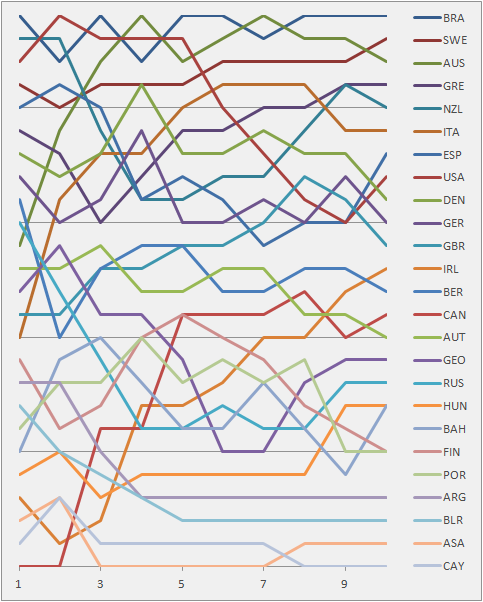
Graph showing the daily standings in the Star during the 1996 Summer Olympics

== Conditions at the Star course areas ==
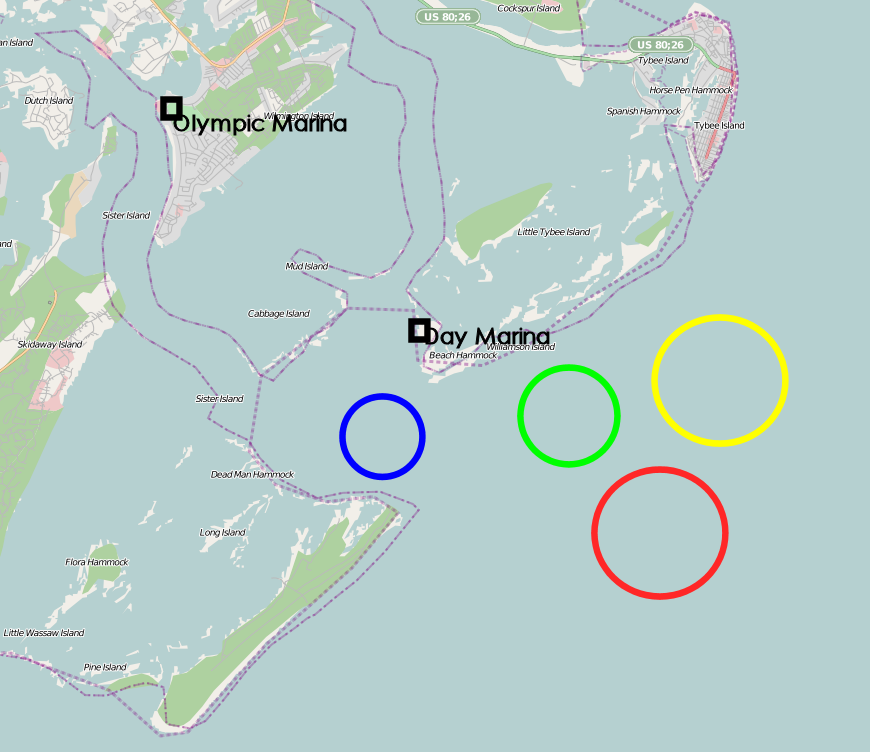
Black: Marinas
Blue: Alpha course
Green: Bravo course
Yellow: Charly course
Red: Delta course

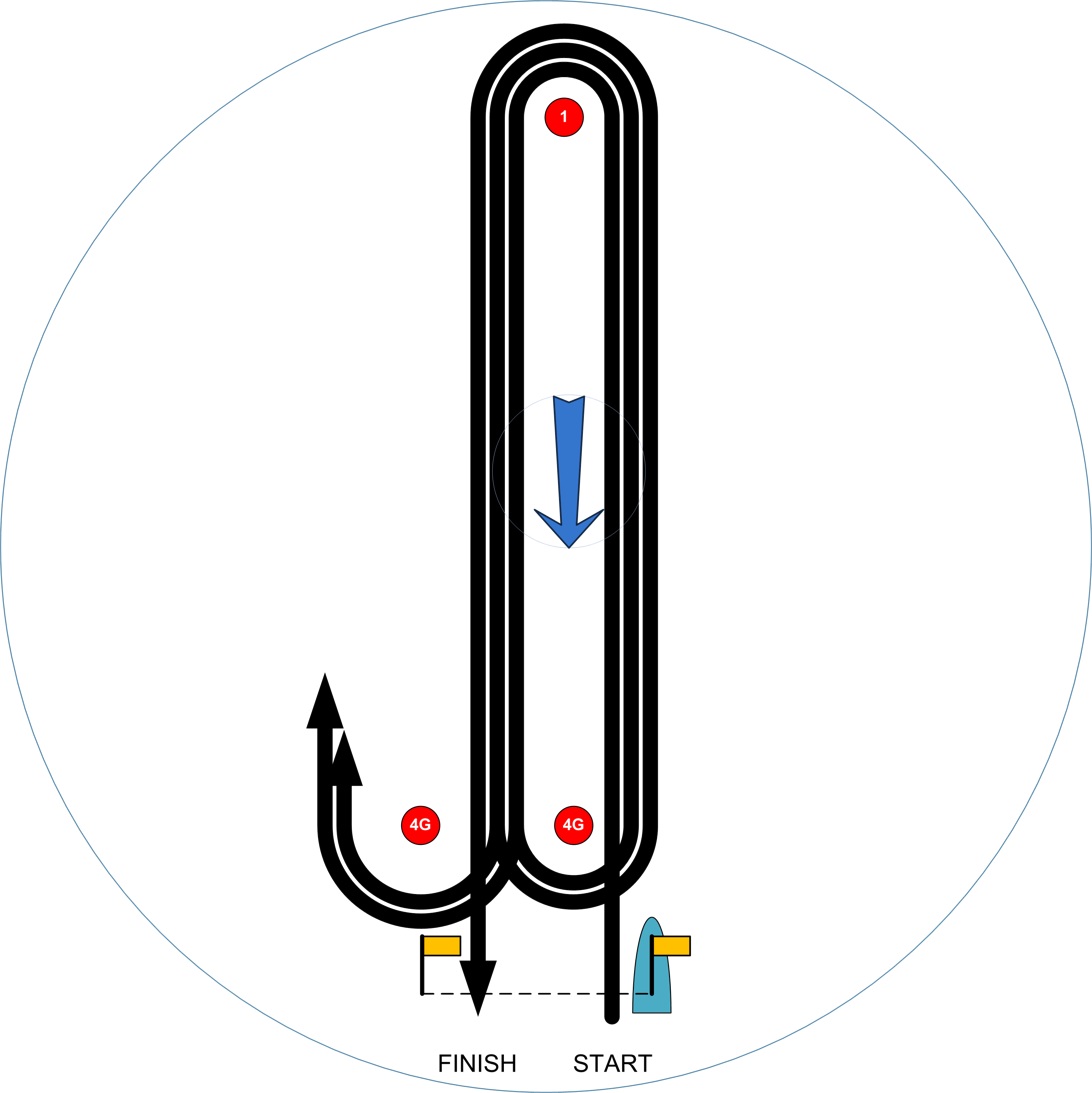
Olympic course WX.
S(Start) - 1 - 4G - 1 - 4G - 1 - F(Finish downwind)

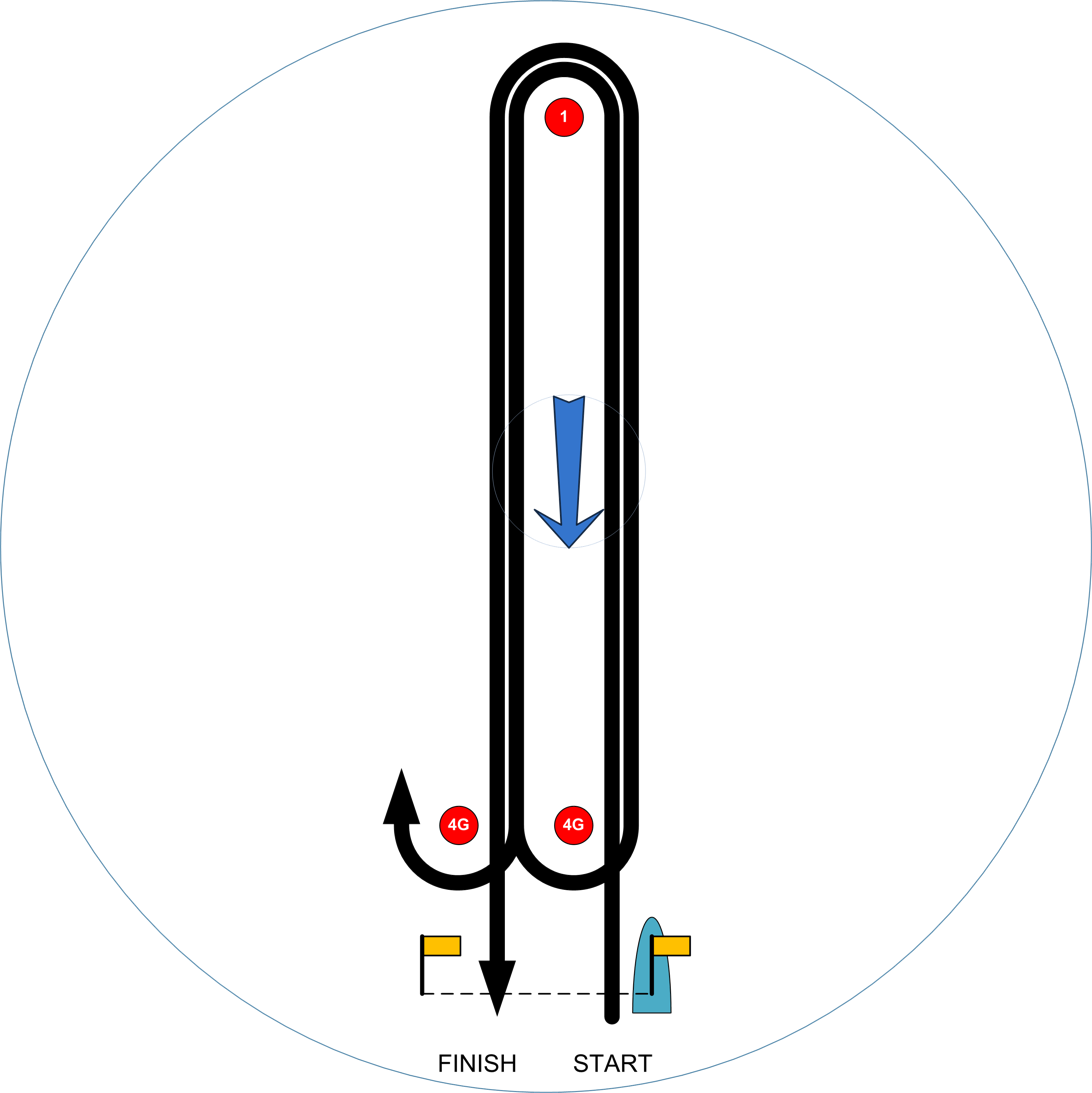
Olympic course WD.
S(Start) - 1 - 4G - 1 - F(Finish downwind)

Date	Race	°C	Knot	Meter	Course	Course area
22 July 1996	I					Charly
23 July 1996	II	29	10	0.6	WX	Charly
23 July 1996	III	29	13	0.8	WX	Charly
24 July 1996	IV	28	11	0.7	WX	Delta
25 July 1996	V	29	13	0.7	WX	Delta
26 July 1996	VI	27	7	0.5	WD	Charly
26 July 1996	VII	27	10	0.5	WX	Charly
27 July 1996	VIII	28	5	0.6	WX	Charly
28 July 1996	IX	29	6	0.7	WD	Charly
29 July 1996	X	28	11	0.6	WX	Charly
