= Sailing at the 1992 Summer Olympics – Star =

Star at the Games of the XXV Olympiad
- Star
- Venue: Barcelona
- Dates: 27 July to 2 August
- Competitors: 52 from 26 nations
- Teams: 26

Medalists
| 1st place, gold medalist(s) | | Mark Reynolds; Hal Haenel | United States |
| 2nd place, silver medalist(s) | | Rod Davis; Don Cowie | New Zealand |
| 3rd place, bronze medalist(s) | | Ross MacDonald; Eric Jespersen | Canada |

The Star Competition at the 1992 Summer Olympics was held from 27 July to 4 August 1992, in Barcelona, Spain. Points were awarded for placement in each race. The best six out of seven race scores did count for the final placement.

== Results ==
| Rank | Helmsman (Country) | Crew | Race I | | Race II | | Race III | | Race IV | | Race V | | Race VI | | Race VII | | Total Points | Total -1 |
| Rank | Helmsman (Country) | Crew | Rank | Points | Rank | Points | Rank | Points | Rank | Points | Rank | Points | Rank | Points | Rank | Points | Total Points | Total -1 |
|---|---|---|---|---|---|---|---|---|---|---|---|---|---|---|---|---|---|---|
| 1 | Mark Reynolds (USA) | Hal Haenel | 2 | 3.0 | 1 | 0.0 | 3 | 5.7 | 1 | 0.0 | 3 | 5.7 | 11 | 17.0 | ~~DNC~~ | ~~33.0~~ | 64.4 | 31.4 |
| 2 | Rod Davis (NZL) | Donald Cowie | 4 | 8.0 | 3 | 5.7 | 5 | 10.0 | ~~12~~ | ~~18.0~~ | 6 | 11.7 | 7 | 13.0 | 5 | 10.0 | 76.4 | 58.4 |
| 3 | Ross Macdonald (CAN) | Eric Jespersen | 3 | 5.7 | 12 | 18.0 | ~~PMS~~ | ~~33.0~~ | 2 | 3.0 | 19 | 25.0 | 4 | 8.0 | 2 | 3.0 | 95.7 | 62.7 |
| 4 | Mark Neeleman (NED) | Jos Schrier | 14 | 20.0 | 7 | 13.0 | 7 | 13.0 | 5 | 10.0 | ~~23~~ | ~~29.0~~ | 1 | 0.0 | 4 | 8.0 | 93.0 | 64.0 |
| 5 | Hans Wallén (SWE) | Bobby Lohse | 19 | 25.0 | 4 | 8.0 | 1 | 0.0 | 8 | 14.0 | 2 | 3.0 | 9 | 15.0 | ~~20~~ | ~~26.0~~ | 91.0 | 65.0 |
| 6 | Hans Vogt (GER) | Jörg Fricke | 7 | 13.0 | ~~17~~ | ~~23.0~~ | 2 | 3.0 | 3 | 5.7 | 16 | 22.0 | 2 | 3.0 | 17 | 23.0 | 92.7 | 69.7 |
| 7 | Colin Beashel (AUS) | David Giles | ~~12~~ | ~~18.0~~ | 10 | 16.0 | 6 | 11.7 | 9 | 15.0 | 5 | 10.0 | 3 | 5.7 | 7 | 13.0 | 89.4 | 71.4 |
| 8 | Iakovos Kiseoglou (GRE) | Dimitrios Boukis | 18 | 24.0 | 8 | 14.0 | 11 | 17.0 | ~~21~~ | ~~27.0~~ | 7 | 13.0 | 10 | 16.0 | 1 | 0.0 | 111.0 | 84.0 |
| 9 | Benny F. Andersen (DEN) | Mogens Just Mikkelsen | ~~21~~ | ~~27.0~~ | 6 | 11.7 | 19 | 25.0 | 4 | 8.0 | 1 | 0.0 | 19 | 25.0 | 10 | 16.0 | 112.7 | 85.7 |
| 10 | Fernando Rita (ESP) | Jaime Piris | 5 | 10.0 | 13 | 19.0 | 14 | 20.0 | 7 | 13.0 | 14 | 20.0 | ~~15~~ | ~~21.0~~ | 3 | 5.7 | 108.7 | 87.7 |
| 11 | Torben Grael (BRA) | Marcelo Ferreira | 8 | 14.0 | 2 | 3.0 | 17 | 23.0 | 6 | 11.7 | ~~PMS~~ | ~~33.0~~ | DNC | 33.0 | 8 | 14.0 | 131.7 | 98.7 |
| 12 | Fernando Bello (POR) | Francisco de Mello | 1 | 0.0 | 9 | 15.0 | ~~PMS~~ | ~~33.0~~ | 19 | 25.0 | 8 | 14.0 | 21 | 27.0 | 14 | 20.0 | 134.0 | 101.0 |
| 13 | Guram Biganishvili (EUN) | Vladimer Gruzdevi | 24 | 30.0 | 19 | 25.0 | ~~DNC~~ | ~~33.0~~ | 15 | 21.0 | 4 | 8.0 | 5 | 10.0 | 6 | 11.7 | 138.7 | 105.7 |
| 14 | David John Howlett (GBR) | Phil Lawrence | 6 | 11.7 | 5 | 10.0 | 4 | 8.0 | 18 | 24.0 | 20 | 26.0 | 20 | 26.0 | ~~DSQ~~ | ~~33.0~~ | 138.7 | 105.7 |
| 15 | Mark Mansfield (IRL) | Tom McWilliam | 11 | 17.0 | 11 | 17.0 | 15 | 21.0 | ~~16~~ | ~~22.0~~ | 12 | 18.0 | 6 | 11.7 | 15 | 21.0 | 127.7 | 105.7 |
| 16 | Roberto Benamati (ITA) | Mario Salani | 16 | 22.0 | 16 | 22.0 | 8 | 14.0 | 10 | 16.0 | ~~22~~ | ~~28.0~~ | 8 | 14.0 | 12 | 18.0 | 134.0 | 106.0 |
| 17 | Steven Kelly (BAH) | Billy Holowesko | 17 | 23.0 | 14 | 20.0 | 10 | 16.0 | ~~22~~ | ~~28.0~~ | 9 | 15.0 | 12 | 18.0 | 18 | 24.0 | 144.0 | 116.0 |
| 18 | Patrick Haegeli (FRA) | Yannick Adde | 9 | 15.0 | 15 | 21.0 | 13 | 19.0 | 14 | 20.0 | 13 | 19.0 | ~~22~~ | ~~28.0~~ | 16 | 22.0 | 144.0 | 116.0 |
| 19 | Peter Bromby (BER) | Paul Fisher | 10 | 16.0 | ~~20~~ | ~~26.0~~ | 16 | 22.0 | 13 | 19.0 | 15 | 21.0 | 18 | 24.0 | 11 | 17.0 | 145.0 | 119.0 |
| 20 | Hubert Raudaschl (AUT) | Friedrich Gruber | 15 | 21.0 | 18 | 24.0 | 18 | 24.0 | 11 | 17.0 | 11 | 17.0 | 14 | 20.0 | ~~22~~ | ~~28.0~~ | 151.0 | 123.0 |
| 21 | Andreas Bienz (SUI) | Beat Stegmeier | 20 | 26.0 | ~~PMS~~ | ~~33.0~~ | 9 | 15.0 | 20 | 26.0 | 10 | 16.0 | 17 | 23.0 | 13 | 19.0 | 158.0 | 125.0 |
| 22 | Tibor Tenke (HUN) | Ferenc Nagy | 13 | 19.0 | 22 | 28.0 | 12 | 18.0 | 17 | 23.0 | 18 | 24.0 | 16 | 22.0 | ~~PMS~~ | ~~33.0~~ | 167.0 | 134.0 |
| 23 | Alberto Zanetti (ARG) | Carlos Gabutti | ~~PMS~~ | ~~33.0~~ | 21 | 27.0 | 20 | 26.0 | 23 | 29.0 | 21 | 27.0 | 13 | 19.0 | 9 | 15.0 | 176.0 | 143.0 |
| 24 | Carlo Falcone (ANT) | Paola Vittoria | ~~25~~ | ~~31.0~~ | 25 | 31.0 | 21 | 27.0 | 26 | 32.0 | 17 | 23.0 | 25 | 31.0 | 21 | 27.0 | 202.0 | 170.0 |
| 25 | John Foster (ISV) | John Foster Jr. | 23 | 29.0 | 23 | 29.0 | 22 | 28.0 | 24 | 30.0 | ~~24~~ | ~~30.0~~ | 23 | 29.0 | 19 | 25.0 | 200.0 | 170.0 |
| 26 | John Patrick Bodden (CAY) | Byron Marsh | 22 | 28.0 | 24 | 30.0 | 23 | 29.0 | ~~25~~ | ~~31.0~~ | 25 | 31.0 | 24 | 30.0 | 23 | 29.0 | 208.0 | 177.0 |

DNF = Did not finish, DSQ = Disqualified, PMS = Premature start
Crossed out results did not count for the total result.
= Male, = Female

=== Daily standings ===
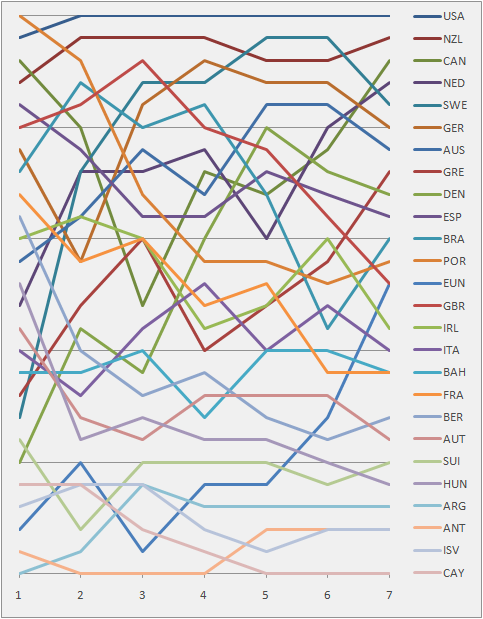
Graph showing the daily standings in the Star during the 1992 Summer Olympics
