= Sailing at the 1988 Summer Olympics – Star =

Star at the Games of the XXIII Olympiad
- Star
- Venue: Busan 부산 釜山
- Dates: 20–27 September
- Competitors: 43 from 21 nations
- Teams: 21

Medalists
1st place, gold medalist(s)		Michael McIntyre; Bryn Vaile	Great Britain
2nd place, silver medalist(s)		Mark Reynolds; Hal Haenel	United States
3rd place, bronze medalist(s)		Torben Grael; Nelson Falcão	Brazil

The Star was a sailing event on the Sailing at the 1988 Summer Olympics program in Pusan, South Korea. Seven races were scheduled. 43 sailors, on 21 boats, from 21 nations competed.

== Results ==
Rank	Helmsman (Country)	Crew	Race I		Race II		Race III		Race IV		Race V		Race VI		Race VII		Total Points	Total -1
Rank	Helmsman (Country)	Crew	Rank	Points	Rank	Points	Rank	Points	Rank	Points	Rank	Points	Rank	Points	Rank	Points	Total Points	Total -1
1st place, gold medalist(s)	Michael McIntyre (GBR)	Bryn Vaile	6	11.7	1	0.0	4	8.0	7	13.0	13	19.0	7	13.0	1	0.0	64.7	45.7
2nd place, silver medalist(s)	Mark Reynolds (USA)	Hal Haenel	8	14.0	4	8.0	1	0.0	5	10.0	4	8.0	4	8.0	RET	28.0	76.0	48.0
3rd place, bronze medalist(s)	Torben Grael (BRA)	Nelson Falcão	1	0.0	7	13.0	2	3.0	11	17.0	2	3.0	RET	28.0	8	14.0	78.0	50.0
4	Mats Johansson (SWE)	Mats Hansson	12	18.0	5	10.0	9	15.0	1	0.0	5	10.0	10	16.0	3	5.7	74.7	56.7
5	Giorgio Gorla (ITA)	Alfio Peraboni	10	16.0	2	3.0	6	11.7	3	5.7	6	11.7	11	17.0	9	15.0	80.1	63.1
6	David Ross MacDonald (CAN)	Bruce MacDonald	3	5.7	11	17.0	12	18.0	2	3.0	1	0.0	14	20.0	RET	28.0	91.7	63.7
7	Colin Beashel (AUS)	Gregory Torpy	4	8.0	8	14.0	13	19.0	6	11.7	12	18.0	6	11.7	2	3.0	85.4	66.4
8	Viktor Soloviev (URS)	Alexandre Zybine	5	10.0	14	20.0	16	22.0	8	14.0	3	5.7	3	5.7	7	13.0	90.4	68.4
9	Steven Bakker (NED)	Kobus Vandenberg	9	15.0	3	5.7	7	13.0	13	19.0	10	16.0	8	14.0	4	8.0	90.7	71.7
10	Alexander Hagen (FRG)	Fritz Girr	2	3.0	6	11.7	5	10.0	4	8.0	DSQ	28.0	DSQ	28.0	6	11.7	100.4	72.4
11	Anders Geert-jensen (DEN)	Mogens Just	PMS	28.0	10	16.0	10	16.0	9	15.0	8	14.0	2	3.0	5	10.0	102.0	74.0
12	Helias Hadjipavlis (GRE)	Konstantinos Manthos	7	13.0	9	15.0	3	5.7	DSQ	28.0	17	23.0	5	10.0	14	20.0	114.7	86.7
13	Hubert Raudaschl (AUT)	Stephan Puxkandl	13	19.0	RET	28.0	11	17.0	15	21.0	9	15.0	1	0.0	13	19.0	119.0	91.0
14	Michael Green (BAR)	Howard Palmer	RET	28.0	18	24.0	14	20.0	12	18.0	7	13.0	17	23.0	10	16.0	142.0	114.0
15	Patrick de Barros (POR)	Henrique Anjos	16	22.0	13	19.0	8	14.0	16	22.0	14	20.0	16	22.0	12	18.0	137.0	115.0
16	Alberto Zanetti (ARG)	Julio Labandeira	15	21.0	16	22.0	15	21.0	10	16.0	15	21.0	13	19.0	15	21.0	141.0	119.0
17	Juan Costas (ESP)	José Pérez	11	17.0	12	18.0	RET	28.0	14	20.0	19	25.0	9	15.0	PMS	28.0	151.0	123.0
18	Jean-Claude Vuithier Jr. (SUI)	Marco Calderari, Christian Hayner	14	20.0	15	21.0	19	25.0	YMP	21.0	16	22.0	DNC	28.0	11	17.0	154.0	126.0
19	Durward Knowles (BAH)	Steven Kelly	18	24.0	19	25.0	17	23.0	17	23.0	11	17.0	18	24.0	DNC	28.0	164.0	136.0
20	John Foster (ISV)	John Jr. Foster	17	23.0	17	23.0	20	26.0	18	24.0	18	24.0	15	21.0	16	22.0	163.0	137.0
21	Bernd Knuppel (URU)	Alejandro Ferreiro	RET	28.0	DNC	28.0	18	24.0	19	25.0	20	26.0	12	18.0	RET	28.0	177.0	149.0

DNF = Did Not Finish, DSQ = Disqualified, PMS = Premature Start
Crossed out results did not count for the total result.
= Male, = Female

=== Daily standings ===
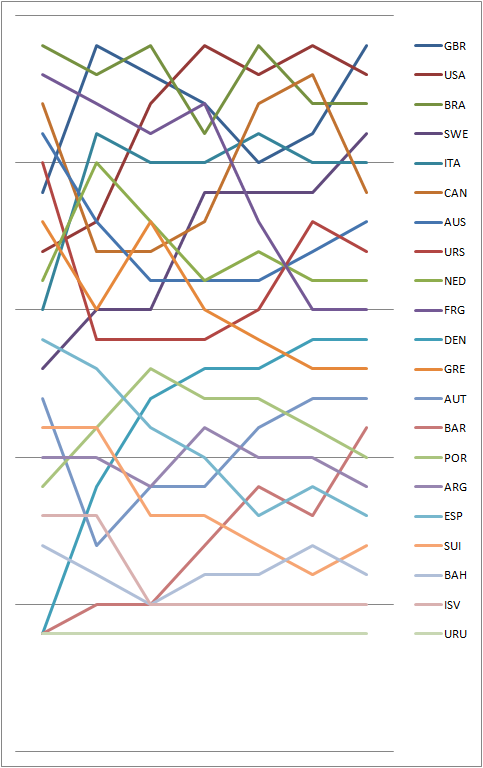
Graph showing the daily standings in the Star during the 1988 Summer Olympics
