= Sailing at the 1932 Summer Olympics – Star =

Star at the Games of the X Olympiad
- Line drawing of the Star
- Venue: Los Angeles Harbor
- Dates: First race: August 5, 1932; Last race: August 12, 1932
- Competitors: 14 from 7 nations
- Teams: 7

Medalists
1st place, gold medalist(s)		Gilbert Gray; Andrew Libano	United States
2nd place, silver medalist(s)		George Colin Ratsey; Peter Jaffe	Great Britain
3rd place, bronze medalist(s)		Gunnar Asther; Daniel Sundén-Cullberg	Sweden

The Star was a sailing event on the Sailing at the 1932 Summer Olympics program in Los Angeles Harbor. Seven races were scheduled, plus possible tiebreakers. Fourteen sailors, on seven boats, from seven nations competed.

== Race schedule ==
●	Event competitions	●	Sail off (3rd, 4th)

Date	August							
Date	5th Fri	6th Sat	7th Sun	8th Mon	9th Tue	10th Wed	11th Thu	12th Fri
Star	●	●	●	●	●	●	●	●
Total gold medals								1

== Course area and course configuration ==
The courses had been well prepared. The marks were laid by the United States Lighthouse Service in the form of large Government. Visiting yachts were kept at a safe distance from the racing boats by the US Coast Guard. Tows were arranged by the US Navy to and from Los Angeles Harbor to the race area. The Star event took place outside the breakwater.

1932 Olympic Course Areas and Course Configurations

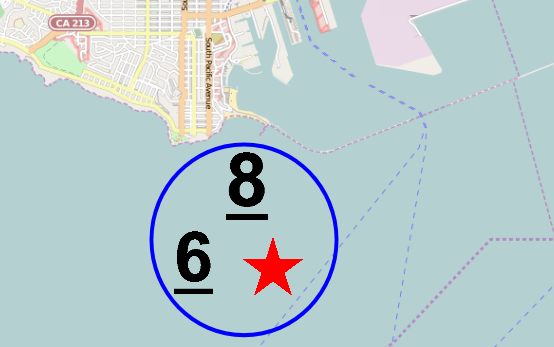
OpenStreetMap view of the current map of Los Angeles. Projected are the 1932 Olympic courses of the Star (Blue Area).

Star course used during race 1 (8nm).

Star course used during race 2 & 5 (10nm).

Star course used during race 3 & 4 (8nm).

Star course used during race 6 & 7 (6nm).

== Weather conditions ==
Date	Race	Wind	Wind direction	Details
5-AUG-1932	1st Race	Heavy		Most Stars reef
6-AUG-1932	2nd Race	Light		Freshening to
7-AUG-1932	3rd Race	Fresh		Increased to 20 knots (10 m/s)
8-AUG-1932	4th Race	20 knots (10 m/s)		
9-AUG-1932	5th Race	Light		
10-AUG-1932	6th Race	Light		Freshening
11-AUG-1932	7th Race	Light		
12-AUG-1932	8th Race	No data available		

== Final results ==
Rank	Country	Helmsman	Crew	Boat	Race 1		Race 2		Race 3		Race 4		Race 5		Race 6		Race 7		Race 8		Total
Rank	Country	Helmsman	Crew	Boat	Pos.	Pts.	Pos.	Pts.	Pos.	Pts.	Pos.	Pts.	Pos.	Pts.	Pos.	Pts.	Pos.	Pts.	Pos.	Pts.	Total
1st place, gold medalist(s)	United States	Gilbert Gray	Andrew Libano	Jupiter	1	7	3	5	1	7	1	7	1	7	2	6	1	7			46
2nd place, silver medalist(s)	Great Britain	George Colin Ratsey	Peter Jaffe	Joy	2	6	4	4	4	4	4	4	3	5	1	7	3	5			35
3rd place, bronze medalist(s)	Sweden	Gunnar Asther	Daniel Sundén-Cullberg	Swedish Star	3	5	7	1	5	3	5	3	4	4	3	5	2	6	SOL	1	28
4	Canada	Harry Wylie	Henry Simmonds	Windor	5	3	5	3	2	6	2	6	6	2	4	4	5	3	DNS	0	27
5	France	Jean-Jacques Herbulot	Jean Peytel	Tramontane	DNF	0	2	6	3	5	3	5	2	6	DSQ	0	4	4			26
6	Netherlands	Bob Maas	Jan Maas	Holland	4	4	6	2	6	2	DNF	0	5	3	5	3	DNS	0			14
7	South Africa	Cecil Goodricke	Arent van Soelen	Springbok	DNF	0	1	7	DNF	0	DNS	0	DNS	0	DNS	0	DNS	0			7

Legend: DNF – Did not finish; DNS – Did not start; DSQ – Disqualified; SOL – Sailed one lap;

== Daily standings ==
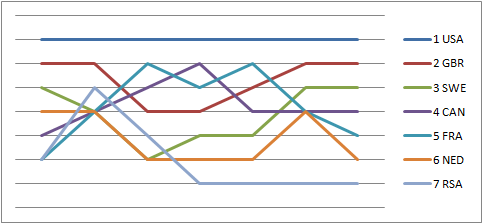
Graph showing the daily standings in the Star during the 1932 Summer Olympics

== Notes ==
- For this event one yacht from each country, crewed by 2 amateurs (maximum number of substitutes 2) was allowed.
- This event was a gender independent event. However it turned out that only men participated.

== Other information ==
During the Sailing regattas at the 1932 Summer Olympics among others the following persons were competing in the Star:

Star victors at the 1932 Olympic Games
Gilbert Gray
Andrew Libano (USA)
