= Greece at the 1988 Summer Olympics =

- IOC code: GRE
- NOC: Committee of the Olympic Games

in Seoul South Korea
- Competitors: 56 (44 men and 12 women) in 12 sports
- Flag bearer: Charalambos "Babis" Cholidis
- Medals Ranked 46th: Gold 0 Silver 0 Bronze 1 Total 1

Summer Olympics appearances (overview)
- 1896; 1900; 1904; 1908; 1912; 1920; 1924; 1928; 1932; 1936; 1948; 1952; 1956; 1960; 1964; 1968; 1972; 1976; 1980; 1984; 1988; 1992; 1996; 2000; 2004; 2008; 2012; 2016; 2020; 2024; 2028

Other related appearances
- 1906 Intercalated Games

Greece competed at the 1988 Summer Olympics in Seoul, South Korea. Greek athletes have competed in every Summer Olympic Games.

== Medalists ==
Medal	Name	Sport	Event	Date
Bronze	Babis Kholidis	Wrestling	Men's Greco-Roman 57 kg	22 September

== Competitors ==
The following is the list of number of competitors in the Games.

Sport	Men	Women	Total
Athletics	0	6	6
Boxing	1	–	1
Gymnastics	0	3	3
Rowing	6	1	7
Sailing	8	0	8
Shooting	1	1	2
Swimming	4	0	4
Tennis	2	1	3
Water polo	13	–	13
Weightlifting	4	–	4
Wrestling	5	–	5
Total	44	12	56

== Athletics ==
Women's Javelin Throw

- Anna Verouli

- Qualification – 58.52m (→ did not advance)

== Sailing ==
Men

Athlete	Event	Race							Net points	Final rank
Athlete	Event	1	2	3	4	5	6	7	Net points	Final rank
Stelios Georgousopoulos	Division II	19	27	~~RET~~	27	RET	RET	RET	247.0	36
Armanto Ortolano	Finn	11	15	17	15	~~DNF~~	15	10	119.0	14

Open

Athlete	Event	Race							Net points	Final rank
Athlete	Event	1	2	3	4	5	6	7	Net points	Final rank
Helias Hadjipavlis; Konstantinos Manthos	Star	7	9	3	~~DSQ~~	17	5	14	86.7	12
Tassos Boudouris; Dimitrios Deligiannis; Antonios Bountouris; Georgios Prekas	Soling	14	~~RET~~	9	18	DSQ	14	RET	133.0	18

== Swimming ==
Men's 100m Backstroke

- Helias Malamas
  1. Heat – 59.24 (→ did not advance, 34th place)

Men's 200m Backstroke

- Charalambos Papanikolaou
  1. Heat – DSQ (→ did not advance, no ranking)

Men's 100m Breaststroke

- Nikolaos Fokianos
  1. Heat – 1:06.30 (→ did not advance, 47th place)

Men's 200m Breaststroke

- Nikolaos Fokianos
  1. Heat – 2:28.91 (→ did not advance, 45th place)

Men's 100m Butterfly

- Theodoras Griniazakis
  1. Heat – 57.56 (→ did not advance, 36th place)

Men's 200m Individual Medley

- Charalambos Papanikolaou
  1. Heat – 2:05.53
  2. B-Final – 2:06.61 (→ 14th place)

Men's 400m Individual Medley

- Charalambos Papanikolaou
  1. Heat – 4:26.72
  2. B-Final – 4:27.95 (→ 16th place)

Men's 4 × 100 m Medley Relay

- Helias Malamas, Nikolaos Fokianos, Theodoros Griniazakis, and Charalambos Papanikolaou
  1. Heat – 4:07.71 (→ did not advance, 23rd place)

== Tennis ==
Women's Singles Competition

- Olga Tsarbopoulou
  1. First Round – Lost to Mercedes Paz (Argentina) 6-7, 3-6

== Water polo ==
=== Men's team competition ===
- Preliminary round (group B)

- Lost to Hungary (10-12)
- Defeated China (10-7)
- Lost to Yugoslavia (7-17)
- Lost to United States (9-18)
- Lost to Spain (9-12)

- Classification Round (Group E)

- Defeated South Korea (17-7)
- Defeated France (10-7) → 9th place

- Team roster

- Nikolaos Christoforidis
- Filippos Kaiafas
- Epaminondas Samartzidis
- Anastasios Tsikaris
- Kyriakos Giannopoulos
- Aristidis Kefalogiannis
- Nikolaos Venetopoulos
- Dimitrios Seletopoulos
- Antonios Aronis
- Evangelos Pateros
- George Mavrotas
- Evangelos Patras

- Head coach: Iosifidis Koulis
