= Michael McIntyre (sailor) =

British sailor

Personal information
- Born: Michael Mackay McIntyre; 29 June 1956 (age 70) Glasgow, Scotland

Sailing career
- Sport: Sailing
- Class(es): Star, Finn
Medal record
Men's sailing
Representing Great Britain
Olympic Games
Gold medal – first place	1988 Seoul	Star

Michael Mackay McIntyre MBE (born 29 June 1956) is a British sailor, who was the Olympic champion in the Star class event at the 1988 Summer Olympics in Seoul. He also competed at the 1984 Summer Olympics in Los Angeles, and won multiple British Finn class championships. In 1989, McIntyre was awarded an MBE for services to yachting.

== Career ==
At the age of 12, McIntyre was a Scottish schools swimming champion. He was a member of Helensburgh and Bosham Sailing Clubs. McIntyre won the British Finn class Championships in 1980, 1981, and 1984.

McIntyre competed at the 1984 Summer Olympics in Los Angeles, finishing seventh in the Finn class. McIntyre competed at the 1988 Summer Olympics in Seoul and won a gold medal in the Star class, together with Bryn Vaile. McIntyre was the skipper of the team, and the pair had been in fourth place going into the final race. The pair won the event after the American pair of Mark Reynolds and Hal Haenel had to retire in the final race due to a broken mast; the Canadian team who were ahead of the Britons also retired from the race, due to a damaged backstay. It was the first Olympic Star class medal by a British team since 1932, when Colin Ratsey and Peter Jaffe finished second in the event.

McIntyre retired from sailing after the 1988 Olympics. In 2012, McIntyre made a one-off return to sailing for an event at the Weymouth and Portland National Sailing Academy on the 2012 Summer Olympics course. His race was ended by a collision with another yacht.

== Personal life ==
McIntyre was born in Glasgow, and his father was a veterinary surgeon. He grew up in Shandon, Dunbartonshire and attended Hermitage Academy, and later the University of Glasgow. McIntyre later lived in Salisbury, England, where he worked in sales management. Despite living in England, McIntyre is an honorary president of Helensburgh Sailing Club in Scotland, and he is also a lifetime honorary member of the Hayling Island Sailing Club.

McIntyre was appointed MBE in the 1989 New Year Honours, for services to yachting. McIntyre is married, and has multiple children. His daughter Eilidh is a former sailor, who won a gold medal in the 470 event at the delayed 2020 Summer Olympics.
