= Shannon Falcone =

Shannon Falcone is a sailor who has competed in multiple America's Cups and Volvo Ocean Races.

Born in England in 1981, Falcone moved to Antigua with his family at the age of 3. He was educated at Clayesmore School.

Falcone originally sailed Stars with his father, Olympian Carlo Falcone, and they competed at the 1998, 1999 and 2000 Star World Championships.

Falcone sailed with Mascalzone Latino at the 2003 Louis Vuitton Cup and Luna Rossa Challenge at the 2007 Louis Vuitton Cup. He then joined Oracle Racing in 2008.

Falcone sailed on Il Mostro during the 2008–09 Volvo Ocean Race and on Mar Mostro during the 2011–12 Volvo Ocean Race.

He sailed on Oracle Team USA 17 during the 2013 America's Cup, where he sailed in all 19 races, before re-joining Luna Rossa.
