= Hejlsberg =

Hejlsberg is a surname. Notable people with the surname include:

- Anders Hejlsberg (born 1960), Danish software engineer
- Martin Hejlsberg (born 1963), Danish sailor
