= Arent van Soelen =

South African sailor

Arent Van Soelen
Personal information
- Full name: Arent Izak van Soelen
- Nationality: South African
- Born: 11 July 1898 Kokstad, Cape Colony
- Died: About 1981 Transvaal, South Africa
- Height: 5 ft 10.5 in (179.1 cm)

Sport

Sailing career
- Class: Star
- Updated on 22 March 2015

Arent Izak van Soelen (July 1898 – c. 1981) was a sailor from South Africa, who represented his country at the 1932 Summer Olympics in Los Angeles, United States.

== Sources ==
- "Arent Van Soelen Bio, Stats, and Results". Olympic Sports. Sports-Reference.com. Archived from the original on 18 April 2020.
