= Jean-Claude Vuithier =

Jean-Claude Vuithier can refer to:

- Jean-Claude Vuithier Sr. (born 1951), Swiss Olympic sailor
- Jean-Claude Vuithier Jr. (born 1968), Swiss Olympic sailor
