= Guillermo Calegari =

Guillermo Calegari can refer to:

- Guillermo Calegari Sr. (1924–2023), Argentine Olympic sailor
- Guillermo Calegari Jr. (born 1951), Argentine Olympic sailor
