= Simo Nikolić =

Simo Nikolić may refer to:

- Simo Nikolić (footballer) (born 1954), Yugoslav former footballer
- Simo Nikolić (sailor) (1941–2012), Croatian sailor

== See also ==
- Sima Nikolić
