= Gabutti =

Gabutti is a surname of Italian origin. Notable people with the surname include:

- Carlos Gabutti (born 1951), Argentine sailor
- Raymond Gabutti (1908–1985), French art director
