= Jos Schrier =

Dutch sailor (born 1960)

Personal information
- Full name: Johannes Leo Jozef Schrier
- Nationality: Dutch
- Born: 28 March 1960 (age 66) Hilversum
- Height: 1.98 m (6.5 ft)
- Weight: 110

Sport

Sailing career
- Class: Star
Competition record
Representing Netherlands
Olympic Games
4th	1992 Barcelona	Star
6th	2000 Sydney	Star
- Updated on 15 February 2014

Johannes Leo Jozef "Jos" Schrier (born 28 March 1960 in Hilversum) is a sailor from the Netherlands, who represented his country at the 1992 Summer Olympics in Barcelona. With Mark Neeleman as helmsman, Schrier took the 4th place in the Star. In the 2000 Sydney Olympics, Schrier made his second Olympic appearance and performed with the Dutch Star Mark Neeleman. Together, they took 6th place in the Star.
