= Harry Wylie =

Canadian sailor

Personal information
- Full name: Henry Edmund "Harry" Wylie
- Nationality: Canadian
- Born: June 3, 1878 Ireland
- Died: April 26, 1951 (aged 72) Vancouver

Sailing career
- Sport: Sailing
- Class: Star
Competition record
Sailing
Representing Canada
Olympic Games
4th	1932 Los Angeles	Star
- Updated on 22 March 2015

Henry Edmund Wylie (1878–1951) was a sailor from Canada, who represented his country at the 1932 Summer Olympics in Los Angeles, US.

== Sources ==
- "Harry Wylie Bio, Stats, and Results". Olympic Sports. Sports-Reference.com. Archived from the original on 18 April 2020.
