= Snipe European Championship =

International sailing competition

The Snipe European Championship is an international sailing regatta in the Snipe class and the most important European competition of the class. It was previously called the Europe and Africa Snipe Class Championship.

It takes place every two years, on alternate years with the World Championship, since 1950, when the first edition was sailed in Santa Margherita Ligure (Italy). The trophy has evolved over the years from 1 representative per country to an open event since 2014. The trophy is awarded to the fleet of the first European boat.

== Champions ==
Year	Host	Skipper	Crew	Fleet
1950	(Italy) Yacht Club Italiano	Raymond Martin du Pan	A. Bestrzynski	(Switzerland) Club Nautique des Faces Pâles
1952	(Denmark) Skovshoved Sejlklub	Eric Barfod	H. P. Fretheim	(Norway) Vestfjordens Seilforening
1954	(France) Cercle de la Voile d'Arcachon	Didier Poissant	G. Bossuet	(France) Cercle de la Voile du Noroit
1956	(Belgium) Royal North Sea Yacht Club	Frank Penman	J. Marsden	(United Kingdom) Northwich Sailing Club
1958	(United Kingdom) Port of Plymouth Sailing Association	Raymond Fragnière	René Glutz	(Switzerland) Société Nautique de Genève
1960	(Sweden) Landskrona Segelsällskap	Raymond Fragnière	Marcel Kaenel	(Switzerland) Société Nautique de Genève
1962	(Spain) Real Club Náutico de Palma	Viggo Lison Almkvist	Bobo Almkvist	(Sweden) Stockholm Snipe Club
1964	(Italy) Yacht Club Sanremo	Nils Monstad	Thor Borgen	(Norway) Vestfjordens Seilforening
1966	(Sweden) Karlshamns Segelsällskap	Antun Grego	Simo Nikolić	(Socialist Federal Republic of Yugoslavia) Jedriličarski Klub Galeb
1968	(Turkey) Karşıyaka Spor Kulübü	Paulo da Silva Santos	Fernando da Silva	(Portugal) Clube Desportivo Nun’Alvares
1970	(Socialist Federal Republic of Yugoslavia) Jedriličarski Klub Galeb	Paulo da Silva Santos	Fernando da Silva	(Portugal) Clube Desportivo Nun’Alvares
1972	(Portugal) Clube de Vela Atlântico	Félix Gancedo	Rafael Parga	(Spain) Real Club Mediterráneo
1974	(Finland) Hangö Segelförening	Félix Gancedo	Javier Otero	(Spain) Real Club Mediterráneo
1976	(France) Société des Régates du Havre	Per Brosted	Jan Skotte	(Denmark) Skanderborg Sejl- & Motorbådsklub
1978	(Spain) Real Club Náutico de Valencia	Félix Gancedo	Carlos Llamas	(Spain) Real Club Mediterráneo
1980	(Denmark) Espergærde Sejlklub	Flemming Rasmussen	Keld Schultz	(Denmark) Espergærde Sejlklub
1982	(Italy) Società Triestina della Vela	Jorge Haenelt	Laureano Wizner	(Spain) Real Club Mediterráneo
1984	(Sweden) Göteborgs Kungliga Segelsällskap	Jorge Haenelt	Laureano Wizner	(Spain) Real Club Mediterráneo
1986	(Spain) Real Club de Regatas de Santiago de la Ribera	Fernando Rita	Antonio Andreu	(Spain) Club Marítimo de Mahón
1988	(Denmark) Juelsminde Sejlklub	Jorge Haenelt	Martín Wizner	(Spain) Real Club Mediterráneo
1990	(Portugal) Clube de Vela Atlântico	Félix Gancedo	Jesús Vilar	(Spain) Real Club Mediterráneo
1992	(Finland) Gamlakarleby Segelförening	Carlos Llamas	Javier Gutiérrez	(Spain) Real Club Mediterráneo
1994	(Spain) Club Marítimo de Mahón	Damián Borrás	Javier Magro	(Spain) Club Marítimo de Mahón
1996	(Denmark) Kolding Sejlklub	Kristoffer Spone	Janett Krefting	(Norway) Kongelig Norsk Seilforening
1998	(Portugal) Sport Club do Porto	Aureliano Negrín	David Martín	(Spain) Real Club Náutico de Arrecife
2000	(Norway) Åsgårdstrand Seilforening	Birger Jansen	Liv Ulveie	(Norway) Vestfjordens Seilforening
2002	(Italy) Reale Circolo Canottieri Tevere Remo	Alexey Krylov	Evgenyi Ryzhikov	(Russia) Moscow Sailing School
2004	(France) Société Nautique de Larmor-Plage	Francisco Sánchez Ferrer	Javier Jiménez	(Spain) Real Club de Regatas de Santiago de la Ribera
2006	(Finland) Segelföreningen i Björneborg	Pablo Fresneda	César Travado	(Spain) Club Náutico Roquetas de Mar
2008	(Spain) Real Club Náutico de Gran Canaria	Gustavo del Castillo	Felipe Llinares	(Spain) Real Club Náutico de Gran Canaria
2010	(Norway) Vestfjordens Seilforening	Francisco Sánchez Ferrer	Marina Sánchez Ferrer	(Spain) Real Club de Regatas de Santiago de la Ribera
2012	(Italy) Circolo Nautico Cervia "Amici della Vela”	Raúl de Valenzuela Santaella	Antolín Alejandre de Oña	(Spain) Club de Mar de Almería
2014	(Poland) Yacht Club Kamień Pomorski	Raúl de Valenzuela Santaella	Antolín Alejandre de Oña	(Spain) Club de Mar de Almería
2016	(Spain) Real Club de Regatas de Santiago de la Ribera	Gustavo del Castillo	Rafael del Castillo	(Spain) Real Club Náutico de Gran Canaria
2018	(Finland) Segelföreningen i Björneborg	Gustavo del Castillo	Rafael del Castillo	(Spain) Real Club Náutico de Gran Canaria
2021^	(Croatia) Jedriličarski klub ˝Split˝	Jordi Triay	Cristian Vidal Carbonell	(Spain) Club Marítimo de Mahón
2023	(Italy) Circolo Vela Gargnano	Jordi Triay	Enric Noguera Serra	(Spain) Club Marítimo de Mahón
2025	(Portugal) Capable Planet Clube Náutico	Jordi Triay	Lluís Mas Barceló	(Spain) Club Marítimo de Mahón

^In 2021 the open regatta was won by Ernesto Rodriguez and Kathleen Tocke (USA), not eligible for the European title.

^^In 2025 the open regatta was won by Julio Alsogaray and Malena Sciarra (ARG), not eligible for the European title.

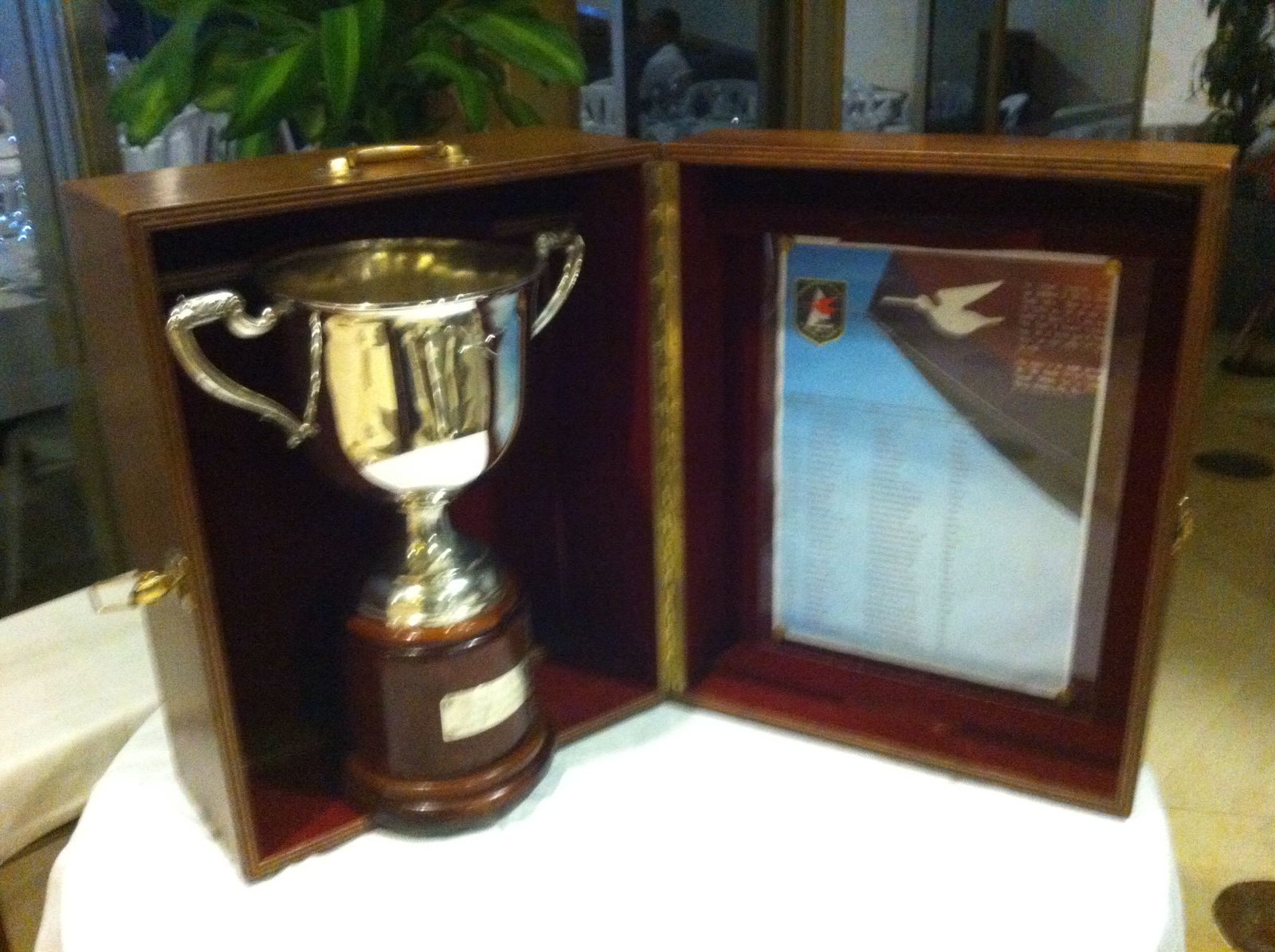
European Championship Trophy.
