= Henry Simmonds =

Canadian architect and sailor

- Born: Henry Holdsby Simmonds; August 25, 1883; Moyhu, Victoria, Australia
- Died: August 1, 1954 (aged 70); Vancouver, Canada
- Sports career
- Sport: Sailing
- Class: Star
Competition record
Sailing
Representing Canada
Olympic Games
4th	1932 Los Angeles	Star
- Updated on 22 March 2015

Henry Holdsby Simmonds sailed for Canada at the 1932 Summer Olympics in Los Angeles, US. He subsequently became an architect who specialized in neighbourhood movie theatres. His Odeon Theatre in Victoria, British Columbia is on the Canadian National Register of Historic Places. He is also known for designing industrial facilities and apartment buildings. Most of his projects were in the Vancouver area.
