= Gilbert Gray =

American sailor

Personal information
- Full name: Gilbert T. Gray
- Born: June 1, 1902 Ruston, Louisiana, U.S.
- Died: July 27, 1981 (aged 79) New Orleans, Louisiana, U.S.

Sailing career
- Sport: Sailing
- Club: Southern Yacht Club
- Class: Star
Medal record
Sailing
Representing United States
Olympic Games
Gold medal – first place	1932 Los Angeles	Star class
World Championships
Gold medal – first place	1928 Newport Harbor	Star class
Silver medal – second place	1929 New Orleans	Star class

Gilbert T. Gray (June 1, 1902 – July 27, 1981) was an American sailor who competed in the 1932 Summer Olympics.

That year, he was a crew member of the American boat Jupiter, which won the gold medal in the Star class event.
