= Phil Lawrence (sailor) =

British sailor

Personal information
- Nationality: British
- Born: 23 June 1955 (age 69); Bournemouth, England

Sport
- Sport: Sailing

Phil Lawrence (born 23 June 1955) is a British sailor. He competed in the Star event at the 1992 Summer Olympics.
