= Andreas Bienz =

Swiss sailor

Personal information
- Nationality: Swiss
- Born: 16 June 1960 (age 64)

Sport
- Sport: Sailing

Andreas Bienz (born 16 June 1960) is a Swiss sailor. He competed in the Star event at the 1992 Summer Olympics.
