= Paul Fisher (sailor) =

Bermudian sailor

Personal information
- Nationality: Bermudian
- Born: 2 June 1962 (age 63)

Sport
- Sport: Sailing

Paul Fisher (born 2 June 1962) is a Bermudian sailor. He competed in the Star event at the 1992 Summer Olympics.
