= Birger Jansen =

Norwegian ice hockey player and sailor

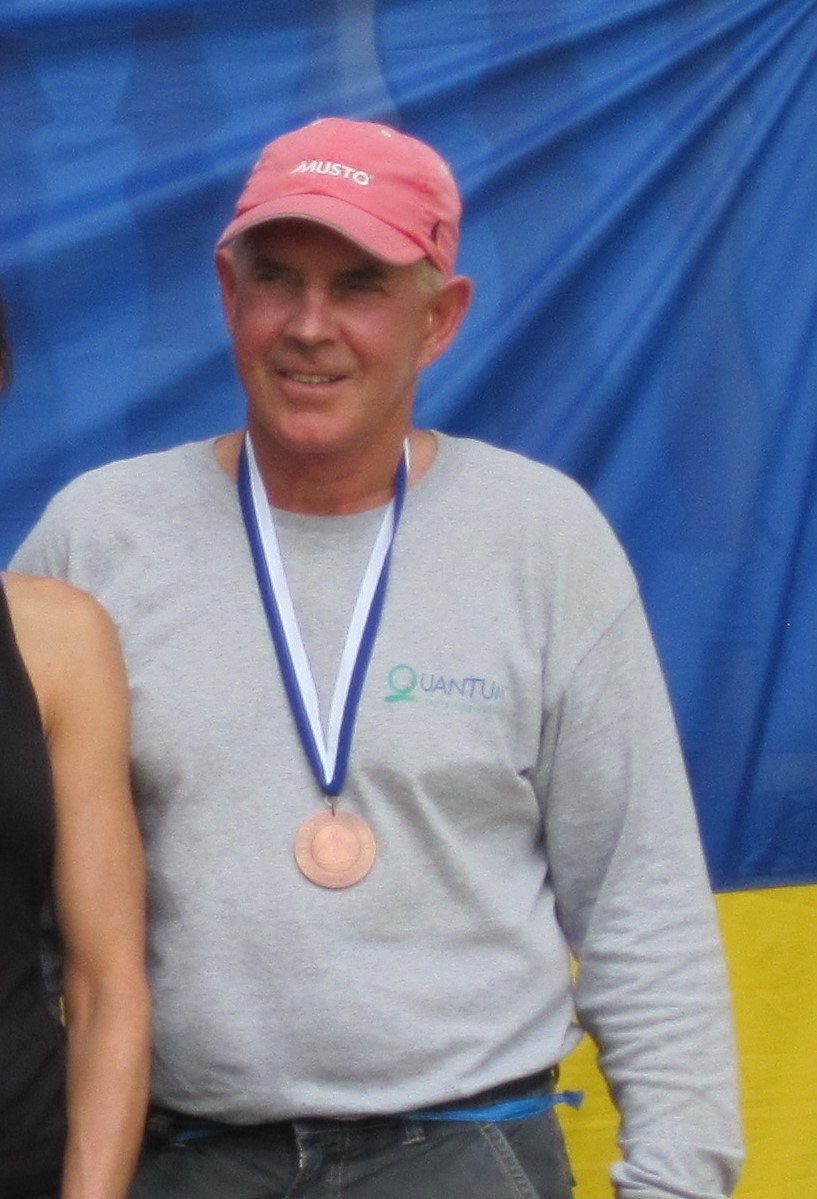
- Birger Jansen at the award ceremony at the Nordic Championships in Snipe 2014 in Motala. Jansen placed third.

Personal information
- Born: 7 January 1948; Bærum, Norway
- Died: 7 November 2016 (aged 68)

Sport
- Country: Norway
- Sport: Ice hockey; Sailing
- Club: Jar IL; IF Frisk Asker

Birger Jansen (7 January 1948 – 7 November 2016) was a Norwegian ice hockey player and sailor.

He was born in Bærum and represented the clubs Jar IL and IF Frisk Asker. He played for the Norwegian national ice hockey team, and participated at the Winter Olympics in Sapporo in 1972, where the Norwegian team placed 8th out of 11 teams.

He was European champion in the Snipe class in 2000, Masters World Champion in 1996, and many times Norwegian champion. He also placed third at the 1991 Snipe Worlds. Birger was also SCIRA commodore in 2002. He died in 2016.
