= George Skuodas =

British sailor (born 1970)

Personal information
- Nationality: British
- Born: 16 August 1970 (age 55) Helensburgh, Scotland

Sport
- Sport: Sailing

George Skuodas (born 16 August 1970) is a British sailor. He competed in the Star event at the 1996 Summer Olympics.
