= Paola Vittoria =

Antigua and Barbuda sailor

Personal information
- Born: 11 November 1960 (age 64); Naples, Italy

Sport
- Country: Antigua and Barbuda
- Sport: Sailing

Paola Vittoria (born 11 November 1960) is an Antigua and Barbuda sailor. She competed in the Star event at the 1992 Summer Olympics.
