= Ferenc Nagy (sailor) =

Hungarian sailor

Personal information
- Nationality: Hungarian
- Born: 19 August 1956 (age 68); Budapest, Hungary

Sport
- Sport: Sailing

Ferenc Nagy (born 19 August 1956) is a Hungarian sailor. He competed in the Star event at the 1992 Summer Olympics.
