= Marco Calderari =

Swiss sailor

Personal information
- Nationality: Swiss
- Born: 15 October 1953 (age 71)

Sport
- Sport: Sailing

Marco Calderari (born 15 October 1953) is a Swiss sailor. He competed in the Star event at the 1988 Summer Olympics.
