= Billy Holowesko =

Bahamian sailor

Personal information
- Nationality: Bahamian
- Born: 14 August 1965 (age 59)

Sport
- Sport: Sailing

Billy Holowesko (born 14 August 1965) is a Bahamian sailor. He competed in the Star event at the 1992 Summer Olympics.
