= Didier Poissant =

French sailor (1923–2021)

Didier Vital Poissant (30 September 1923 – 27 February 2021) was a French sailor who competed in the 1956 Summer Olympics, and won the Snipe European Championship in 1954. He died in February 2021 at the age of 97.
