= Jaime Piris =

Spanish competitive sailor

Personal information
- Nationality: Spanish
- Born: 17 February 1962 (age 63); Cantabria, Spain

Sport
- Sport: Sailing

Jaime Piris (born 17 February 1962) is a Spanish sailor. He competed in the Star event at the 1992 Summer Olympics.
