= Iakovos Kiseoglou =

Greek sailor

Personal information
- Native name: Ιάκωβος Κισέογλου
- Nationality: Greek
- Born: 17 September 1967 (age 58) Athens, Greece

Sport
- Sport: Sailing

Iakovos Kiseoglou (born 17 September 1967) was a Greek sailor. He competed in the Star event at the 1992 Summer Olympics.
