= András Komm =

Hungarian sailor

Personal information
- Nationality: Hungarian
- Born: 8 January 1974 (age 51); Budapest, Hungary

Sport
- Sport: Sailing

András Komm (born 8 January 1974) is a Hungarian sailor. He competed in the Star event at the 1996 Summer Olympics.
