= Andrew Libano =

American sailor

Medal record

Sailing

Representing the United States

Olympic Games
Gold medal – first place	1932 Los Angeles	Star class

Andrew Jackson Libano Jr. (January 19, 1903 – June 22, 1935) was an American sailor who competed in the 1932 Summer Olympics.

== Career ==
In 1932 he was a crew member of the American boat Jupiter, which won the gold medal in the Star class.

== Death ==
He died as result of a Streptococcal infection in New Orleans, Louisiana.
