= Simo Nikolić (sailor) =

Croatian sailor

Personal information
- Born: 29 January 1941 Novi Sad, Yugoslavia
- Died: 9 April 2012 (aged 71) Rijeka, Croatia

Sport
- Sport: Sailing

Simo Nikolić (29 January 1941 – 9 April 2012) was a Croatian sailor. He competed for Yugoslavia at the 1968 and 1972 Summer Olympics. He became European Champion in 1966, runner-up in 1968, and bronze medallist in the 1967 World Championship of the Snipe class, in all cases as a crew of Anton Grego.
