= Gregory Torpy =

Australian sailor

Personal information
- Nationality: Australian
- Born: 28 January 1962 (age 64)

Sport
- Sport: Sailing

Gregory Torpy (born 28 January 1962) is an Australian sailor. He competed in the Star event at the 1988 Summer Olympics.
