= Stephan Puxkandl =

Austrian sailor

Personal information
- Nationality: Austrian
- Born: 8 April 1962 (age 62)

Sport
- Sport: Sailing

Stephan Puxkandl (born 8 April 1962) is an Austrian sailor. He competed in the Star event at the 1988 Summer Olympics.
