= Anatoly Mikhaylin =

Russian sailor

Personal information
- Nationality: Russian
- Born: 19 August 1958 (age 66)

Sport
- Sport: Sailing

Anatoly Mikhaylin (born 19 August 1958) is a Russian sailor. He competed in the Star event at the 1996 Summer Olympics.
