= Csaba Haranghy =

Hungarian sailor

Personal information
- Nationality: Hungarian
- Born: 20 September 1963 (age 61); Budapest, Hungary

Sport
- Sport: Sailing

Csaba Haranghy (born 20 September 1963) is a Hungarian sailor. He competed in the Star event at the 1996 Summer Olympics.
