= Mark Neeleman =

Dutch sailor (born 1959)

Personal information
- Full name: Mark Jacobus Louis Neeleman
- Nationality: Dutch
- Born: 16 April 1959 (age 67) Baghdad, Iraq
- Height: 1.84 m (6.0 ft)

Sailing career
- Sport: Sailing
- Club: Roei- en Zeilvereniging "Gouda"
- Classes: Laser, Finn, O-Jolle, Star, Dragon
Medal record
Representing NED
World Championships
| Bronze medal – third place | 1977 Cabo Frio | Laser |
| Bronze medal – third place | 1979 Weymouth | Finn |
| Bronze medal – third place | 1983 Milwaukee | Finn |
European Championships
| Silver medal – second place | 1995 | Finn |
| Silver medal – second place | 2003 Cascais | Star |
| Silver medal – second place | 2004 L'Escala | Star |
- Updated on 15 February 2014

Mark Jacobus Louis Neeleman (born 16 April 1959, in Baghdad, Iraq) is a sailor from the Netherlands. Since the Netherlands did boycott the Moscow Olympic Games Neeleman represented his National Olympic Committee at the 1980 Summer Olympics in Tallinn, USSR under the Dutch NOC flag. Neeleman took 8th place in the 1980 Summer Olympics, which was boycotted by several countries. In 1984 Summer Olympics, Los Angeles Neeleman did a second attempt in the Finn and finished on the 9th place. Neeleman missed the selection for the 1988 Olympics, Pusan.

After that he switched to the Star. With crew member Jos Schrier at the 1992 Summer Olympics in Barcelona Neeleman took 4th place. Again in the Star and again with Jos Schrier, Neeleman took 6th place in the 2000 Summer Olympics, Sydney. His last Olympic appearance was in the 2004 Athens Olympics. This time with crew member Peter van Niekerk, Neeleman took 14th place in the Star.

Besides his Olympic sailing career Mark Neeleman won the 1995 J/22 World Championship and became in total 16 times Dutch Champion over several different classes. Among them there were titles in the Youth class, O-Jolle, Finn, Regenboog, J/22, Dragon. Neeleman was tactician on Favonius Swann 8o ft 3rd worlds and tactician/co-helmsman on Rainbow J-Class 2012/2013
