= Friedrich Gruber =

Austrian sailor

Personal information
- Nationality: Austrian
- Born: 14 July 1968 (age 56); Klagenfurt, Austria

Sport
- Sport: Sailing

Friedrich Gruber (born 14 July 1968) is an Austrian sailor. He competed in the Star event at the 1992 Summer Olympics.
