= Christian Hayner =

Swiss sailor

Personal information
- Nationality: Swiss
- Born: 14 October 1965 (age 59)

Sport
- Sport: Sailing

Christian Hayner (born 14 October 1965) is a Swiss sailor. He competed in the Star event at the 1988 Summer Olympics.
