= Byron Marsh =

Caymanian sailor

Personal information
- Nationality: Caymanian
- Born: 29 June 1950 (age 74)

Sport
- Sport: Sailing

Byron Marsh (born 29 June 1950) is a Caymanian sailor. He competed in the Star event at the 1992 Summer Olympics.
