= Vladimir Zuyev (sailor) =

Belarusian sailor

Personal information
- Nationality: Belarusian
- Born: 11 January 1961 (age 64)

Sport
- Sport: Sailing

Vladimir Zuyev (born 11 January 1961) is a Belarusian sailor. He competed in the Star event at the 1996 Summer Olympics.
