= Leif Möller =

Swedish sailor (born 1958)

Leif Åke Möller (born 11 April 1958 in Lund) is a retired Swedish Olympic sailor in the Star class. He competed in the 2000 Summer Olympics together with Mats Johansson, where they finished 13th.
