= Mauro Maiola =

Argentine sailor

Personal information
- Nationality: Argentine
- Born: 24 January 1968 (age 57)

Sport
- Sport: Sailing

Mauro Maiola (born 24 January 1968) is an Argentine sailor. He competed in the Star event at the 1996 Summer Olympics.
