= Francisco de Mello =

Portuguese sailor

Personal information
- Nationality: Portuguese
- Born: 14 October 1963 (age 61)

Sport
- Sport: Sailing

Francisco de Mello (born 14 October 1963) is a Portuguese sailor. He competed in the Star event at the 1992 Summer Olympics.
