= Fritz Girr =

German sailor

Personal information
- Nationality: German
- Born: 3 October 1963 Augsburg, Germany
- Died: 12 September 2021 (aged 57)

Sport
- Sport: Sailing

Fritz Girr (3 October 1963 – 12 September 2021) was a German sailor. He competed in the Star event at the 1988 Summer Olympics.
