= Theodoros Griniazakis =

Greek swimmer

Personal information
- Born: 17 January 1968 (age 58)

Sport
- Sport: Swimming

Theodoros Griniazakis (born 17 January 1968) is a Greek swimmer. He competed in two events at the 1988 Summer Olympics.
