= Konstantinos Manthos =

Greek sailor

Personal information
- Nationality: Greek
- Born: 16 October 1965 (age 59)

Sport
- Sport: Sailing

Konstantinos Manthos (born 16 October 1965) is a Greek sailor. He competed in the Star event at the 1988 Summer Olympics.
