= Fernando Rita =

Spanish sailor

Personal information
- Nationality: Spanish
- Born: 30 November 1961 (age 64) Barcelona, Spain

Sport
- Country: Spain
- Sport: Sailing
- Club: Club Marítimo de Mahón
Medal record
Sailing
Representing Spain
World Championships
Bronze medal – third place	1999 Santiago de la Ribera	Snipe
European Championships
Gold medal – first place	1986 Santiago de la Ribera	Snipe
Bronze medal – third place	1988 Juelsminde	Snipe

Fernando Rita (born 30 November 1961) is a Spanish sailor. He competed in the Star event at the 1992 Summer Olympics. In the Snipe class he was third at the World's in 1999, European champion in 1986, and third in 1988.
