= Patrick de Barros =

Portuguese sailor

Personal information
- Nationality: Portuguese
- Born: 3 February 1945 (age 80)

Sport
- Sport: Sailing

Patrick de Barros (born 3 February 1945) is a Portuguese sailor. He competed in the Star event at the 1988 Summer Olympics.
