= Ville Kurki =

Finnish sailor (1968–2022)

Personal information
- Nationality: Finnish
- Born: 24 March 1968; Kerava, Finland
- Died: 12 July 2022 (aged 54)

Sailing career
- Class: Star
- Club: Naantalin Purjehdusseura

Ville Kurki (24 March 1968 – 12 July 2022) was a Finnish sailor. He competed in the Star event at the 1996 Summer Olympics.

Kurki represented Naantalin Purjehdusseura.
