= Carlos Gabutti =

Argentine sailor

Personal information
- Nationality: Argentine
- Born: 13 August 1951 (age 73)

Sport
- Sport: Sailing

Carlos Gabutti (born 13 August 1951) is an Argentine sailor. He competed in the Star event at the 1992 Summer Olympics.
