= Daniel Sundén-Cullberg =

Swedish sailor

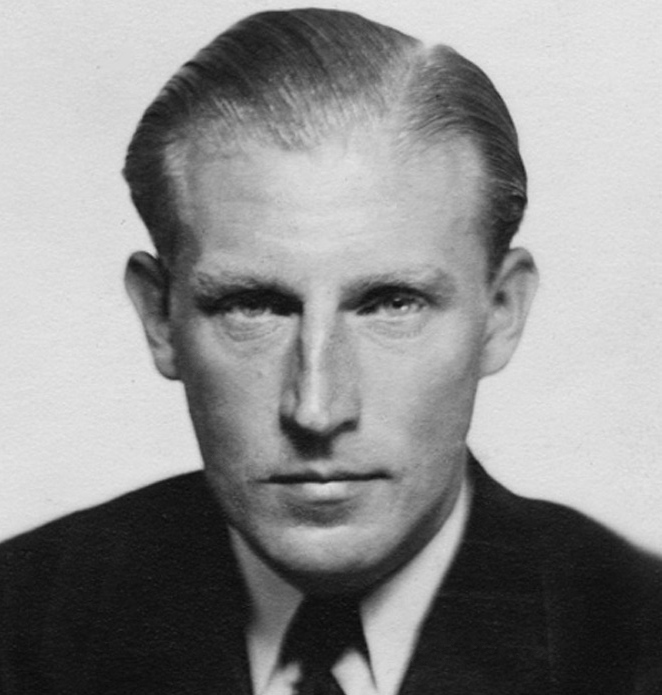

Personal information
- Full name: Daniel Alrik Sundén-Cullberg
- Born: 6 April 1907 Stockholm, Sweden
- Died: 27 January 1982 (aged 74) Veinge, Sweden

Sport

Sailing career
- Class: Star
- Club: Royal Swedish Yacht Club
Medal record
Sailing
Representing Sweden
Olympic Games
Bronze medal – third place	1932 Los Angeles	Star class

Daniel Alrik "Dan" Sundén-Cullberg (6 April 1907 – 27 January 1982) was a Swedish sailor. He was a crew member of the boat Swedisk Star that won the bronze medal in the Star class at the 1932 Summer Olympics.
