= Nikolaos Fokianos =

Greek swimmer

Personal information
- Born: 18 April 1965 (age 61)

Sport
- Sport: Swimming

Nikolaos Fokianos (born 18 April 1965) is a Greek swimmer. He competed in three events at the 1988 Summer Olympics.
