= Antun Grego =

Croatian sailor

Personal information
- Nationality: Croatian
- Born: 8 December 1940 (age 85) Omišalj, Yugoslavia

Sport
- Sport: Sailing

Antun Grego (born 8 December 1940) is a Croatian sailor. He competed at the 1968 Summer Olympics and the 1972 Summer Olympics. In the Snipe class, Grego was the European champion in 1966, runner-up in 1968, and bronze medallist in the 1967 World Championship.
