= Jean-Claude Vuithier Jr. =

Swiss sailor

Personal information
- Nationality: Swiss
- Born: 25 October 1968 (age 56)

Sport
- Sport: Sailing

Jean-Claude Vuithier Jr. (born 25 October 1968) is a Swiss sailor. He competed in the Star event at the 1988 Summer Olympics.
