= Bruce MacDonald (sailor) =

Canadian sailor

Personal information
- Nationality: Canadian
- Born: 2 July 1960 (age 66) Penticton, British Columbia, Canada

Sport
- Sport: Sailing

Bruce MacDonald (born 2 July 1960) is a Canadian sailor. He competed in the Star event at the 1988 Summer Olympics.
