= Real Club Náutico de Gran Canaria =

Coordinates: 28.1333°N 15.4283°W

- Emblem

- Burgee
- Short name: RCNGC
- Founded: 1908
- Location: Las Palmas, Spain
- Website: http://www.clubnauticogc.com

Real Club Náutico de Gran Canaria (Royal Gran Canaria Yacht Club in English) is a private yacht club located in Las Palmas, Gran Canaria (Canary Islands, Spain). The club has around 6,000 members and their families.

== History ==
It was established in 1908 and royal patronage was granted by king Alfonso XIII of Spain.

In 1965, the club organized the Snipe World Championship and dinghy sailing took off at the club.

Since then, it has become one of the world's winningest dinghy racing club, as the club's yacht racers have won 5 olympic gold medals (470 in 1984, Finn in 1988, Flying Dutchman in 1992, women's 470 in 1992 and Tornado in 1996), and 42 world championships (as of the end of 2015).

The club has had 18 olympic sailors. Six of them won gold medals:

- Luis Doreste in Los Angeles 1984 (470) and Barcelona 1992 (Flying Dutchman)
- Roberto Molina in Los Angeles 1984 (470)
- Domingo Manrique in Barcelona 1992 (Flying Dutchman)
- José Doreste in Seoul 1988 (Finn)
- Patricia Guerra in Barcelona 1992 (women's 470)
- Fernando Léon in Atlanta 1996 (Tornado)
