= Diogo Cayolla =

Portuguese sailor

Personal information
- Full name: Diogo Furtado de Antas de Almeida Cayolla
- Nationality: Portuguese
- Born: 6 August 1974 (age 50); Porto, Portugal

Sport
- Sport: Sailing

Diogo Cayolla (born 6 August 1974) is a Portuguese sailor. He competed at the 1996 Summer Olympics, the 2000 Summer Olympics, and the 2004 Summer Olympics.
