= Gunnar Asther =

Swedish sailor (1892–1974)

Olympic medal record

Men's Sailing
Bronze medal – third place	1932 Los Angeles	Star class

Gunnar Anton Edvard Asther (March 4, 1892 – February 28, 1974) was a Swedish sailor who competed in the 1932 Summer Olympics.

In 1932, he was a crew member of the Swedish boat Swedish Star which won the bronze medal in the Star class.
