= Bryn Vaile =

British sailor

Medal record

Men's sailing

Representing United Kingdom

Olympic Games
| Gold medal – first place | 1988 Seoul | Star |

Philip Bryn Vaile MBE (born 16 August 1956) is an English sailor and Olympic champion. He competed at the 1988 Summer Olympics in Seoul and won a gold medal in the Star class, together with Michael McIntyre representing Great Britain.
