= Martin Hejlsberg =

Danish sailor

Personal information
- Nationality: Danish
- Born: 26 July 1963 (age 61)

Sport
- Sport: Sailing

Martin Hejlsberg (born 26 July 1963) is a Danish sailor. He competed in the Star event at the 1996 Summer Olympics.
