= Jörg Fricke =

German sailor (born 1966)

Jörg Fricke (born March 13, 1966, in Gräfelfing, West Germany) is a German Olympic sailor in the Star class. He competed in the 1992 Summer Olympics, where he finished 6th together with Hans Vogt Jr.
