= Sergey Khoretsky =

Belarusian sailor

Personal information
- Nationality: Belarusian
- Born: 31 March 1956 (age 68); Minsk, Belarus

Sport
- Sport: Sailing

Sergey Khoretsky (born 31 March 1956) is a Belarusian sailor. He competed in the Star event at the 1996 Summer Olympics.
