= Peter Jaffe =

British competitive sailor

Personal information
- Full name: James Peter Jaffe
- Nationality: Great Britain
- Born: 22 November 1913 Richmond, Greater London, Great Britain
- Died: 20 August 1982 (aged 68) Orange, California, U.S.

Sport
- Sport: Sailing
Medal record
Sailing
Representing Great Britain
Olympic Games
Silver medal – second place	1932 Los Angeles	Star class

James Peter Jaffe (22 November 1913 – 20 August 1982, in Orange, California) was a British competitive sailor and Olympic medalist.

He won a silver medal in the Star class mixed two-person keelboat at the 1932 Summer Olympics in Los Angeles, at the age of 18.

Jaffe was Jewish, and was born in Richmond, in Greater London.

== See also ==
- List of select Jews in sailing
- List of British Jewish sportspeople
