= Carlo Falcone =

Antigua and Barbuda sailor

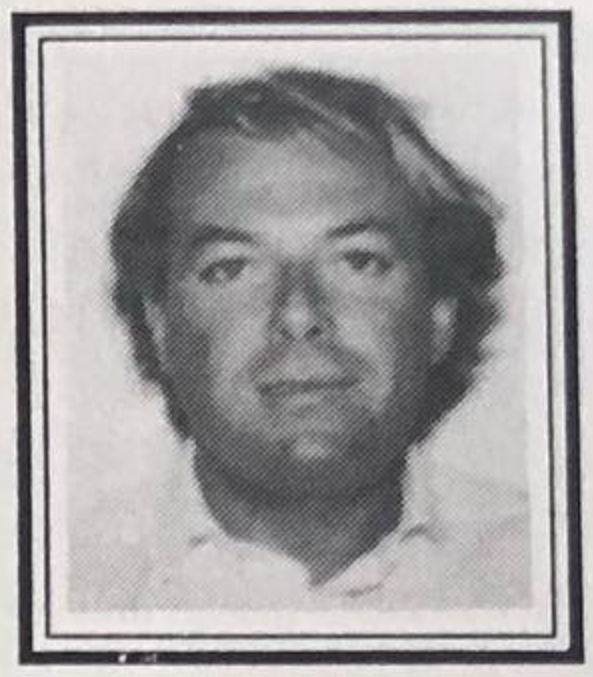

Personal information
- Born: 10 March 1954 (age 71); Livorno, Italy

Sport
- Country: Antigua and Barbuda
- Sport: Sailing

Carlo Falcone (born 10 March 1954) is an Antigua and Barbuda sailor. He competed in the Star event at the 1992 Summer Olympics.
