= Hans Vogt Jr. =

German sailor (born 1962)

Hans Vogt (born 15 January 1962) is a German Olympic sailor in the Star class. He competed in the 1992 Summer Olympics, where he finished 6th together with Jörg Fricke.
