= Beat Stegmeier =

Swiss sailor (born 1962)

Personal information
- Nationality: Swiss
- Born: 11 October 1962 (age 62)

Sport
- Sport: Sailing

Beat Stegmeier (born 11 October 1962) is a Swiss sailor. He competed in the Star event at the 1992 Summer Olympics.
