= Paolo Semeraro =

Italian sailor

Personal information
- Nationality: Italian
- Born: 15 March 1962 (age 63); Bari, Italy

Sport
- Sport: Sailing

Paolo Semeraro (born 15 March 1962) is an Italian sailor. He competed at the 1984 Summer Olympics and the 1988 Summer Olympics.
