= Nelson Falcão =

Brazilian sailor

Personal information
- Nationality: Brazilian
- Born: 30 April 1946 (age 80) Rio de Janeiro, Brazil

Sailing career
- Sport: Sailing
- Class: Star
Medal record
Sailing
Representing Brazil
Olympic Games
Bronze medal – third place	1988 Seoul	Star class

Nelson Falcão (born 30 April 1946) is a Brazilian sailor. He received a bronze medal in the Star Class at the 1988 Summer Olympics in Seoul, South Korea with Torben Grael.
