= Richard Grönblom =

Finnish sailor

Personal information
- Nationality: Finnish
- Born: 17 July 1948 (age 76); Helsinki, Finland

Sport
- Sport: Sailing

Richard Grönblom (born 17 July 1948) is a Finnish sailor. He competed at the 1976 Summer Olympics and the 1996 Summer Olympics.
