= Javier Hermida =

Spanish sailor

Personal information
- Nationality: Spanish
- Born: 8 April 1968 (age 57)

Sport
- Sport: Sailing

Javier Hermida (born 8 April 1968) is a Spanish sailor. He competed in the Star event at the 1996 Summer Olympics.
