= Roberto Sinibaldi =

Italian yacht racer

Roberto Sinibaldi (born 2 August 1973) is an Italian former yacht racer who competed in the 1996 Summer Olympics. He was born in Orbetello, Grosseto, Italy.
