= Eric Jespersen =

Canadian sailor

Personal information
- Full name: Eric Albert Jespersen
- Born: October 18, 1961 (age 65) Port Alberni, British Columbia
- Height: 187 cm (6 ft 2 in)
- Weight: 113 kg (249 lb)

Sailing career
- Sport: Sailing
- Club: Royal Vancouver Yacht Club
Medal record
Men's sailing
Representing Canada
Olympic Games
Bronze medal – third place	1992 Barcelona	Star

Eric Albert Jespersen (born October 18, 1961, in Port Alberni, British Columbia) is a Canadian sailor.

He won a bronze medal with Ross MacDonald in the men's Star event at the 1992 Summer Olympics and finished 14th at the 1996 Summer Olympics in the same event.
