= Hal Haenel =

American sailor

Personal information
- Full name: Hal H. Haenel
- Born: October 18, 1958 (age 67) St. Louis, Missouri, U.S.

Sailing career
- Sport: Sailing
- Club: California Yacht Club
- Class: Star
Medal record
Men's sailing
Representing the United States
Olympic Games
Gold medal – first place	1992 Barcelona	Star
Silver medal – second place	1988 Seoul	Star
World Championships
Gold medal – first place	1995 Laredo	Star class
Silver medal – second place	1988 Buenos Aires	Star class
Silver medal – second place	1996 Rio de Janeiro	Star class
Bronze medal – third place	1991 Cannes	Star class
Bronze medal – third place	2013 San Diego	Star class

Hal H. Haenel (born October 18, 1958 in St. Louis, Missouri) is an American sailor and Olympic Champion. He competed at the 1992 Summer Olympics in Barcelona and won a gold medal in the Star class with Mark Reynolds. He received a silver medal at the 1988 Summer Olympics in Seoul.
