= Star (keelboat) =

International one-design racing sailing keelboat class

- Class symbol

Development
- Designer: Francis Sweisguth
- Year: 1910

Boat
- Crew: 2 (Skipper + Crew); S + 1.5 C ≤ 250 kg (550 lb)
- Draft: 1.016 m (3 ft 4 in)

Hull
- Type: keelboat
- Hull weight: ≥ 671 kg (1,479 lb) (including keel)
- LOA: 6.922 m (22 ft 9 in)
- LWL: 4.724 m (15 ft 6 in)
- Beam: 1.734 m (5 ft 8 in) at deck 1.372 m (4 ft 6 in) at chine

Hull appendages
- Keel: bulb keel 401.5 ± 7 kg (885 ± 15 lb)

Rig
- Rig type: sloop
- Mast height: 9.652 m (31 ft 8 in)

Sails
- Mainsail area: 20.5 m^{2} (221 sq ft)
- Jib/genoa area: 6.0 m^{2} (65 sq ft)
- Upwind sail area: ≤ 26.5 m^{2} (285 sq ft)

The Star is a 6.9 metres (23 ft) one-design racing keelboat for two people designed by Francis Sweisguth in 1910. The Star was an Olympic sailboat class from 1932 through to 2012, the last year keelboats appeared at the Summer Olympics.

It is sloop-rigged, with a mainsail larger in proportional size than any other boat of its length. Unlike most modern racing boats, it does not use a spinnaker when sailing downwind. Instead, when running downwind a whisker pole is used to hold the jib out to windward for correct wind flow. Early Stars were built from wood, but modern boats are generally made of fiberglass. The boat must weigh at least 671 kg (1,479 lb) with a maximum total sail area of 26.5 m^{2} (285 sq ft). The Star class pioneered an unusual circular boom vang track, which allows the vang to effectively hold the boom down even when the boom is turned far outboard on a downwind run. Another notable aspect of Star sailing is the extreme hiking position adopted by the crew and at times the helmsman, who normally use a harness to help hang low off the windward side of the boat with only their lower legs inside.

== History ==
Original sail plan (pre-1922)

The Star was designed in 1910 by Francis Sweisguth, a draftsman at the William Gardner Marine Architect office. Over the course of his career Sweisguth designed a variety of yachts. A more traditional example of his work is Silent Maid, a Barnegat Bay B-class catboat designed shortly after the Star. The first 22 stars were built in Port Washington, New York by Ike Smith during the winter of 1910–11. Since that time, over 8,600 boats have been built, with more than 2,000 actively racing in 170 fleets.

The hull is a hard chine design with a slight curve to the bottom section, and a bulb keel. The Star was originally rigged with a large, low-aspect-ratio gunter mainsail and jib, which was replaced by a short bermuda rig gradually during the early 1920s, before the current tall bermuda sail plan was adopted in 1930. In 1965, fiberglass replaced wood as the primary hull material. Other changes to the strict design rules for the Star class, include adding flexible spars, an innovative circular-track boom vang, and self-bailers.

== Events ==
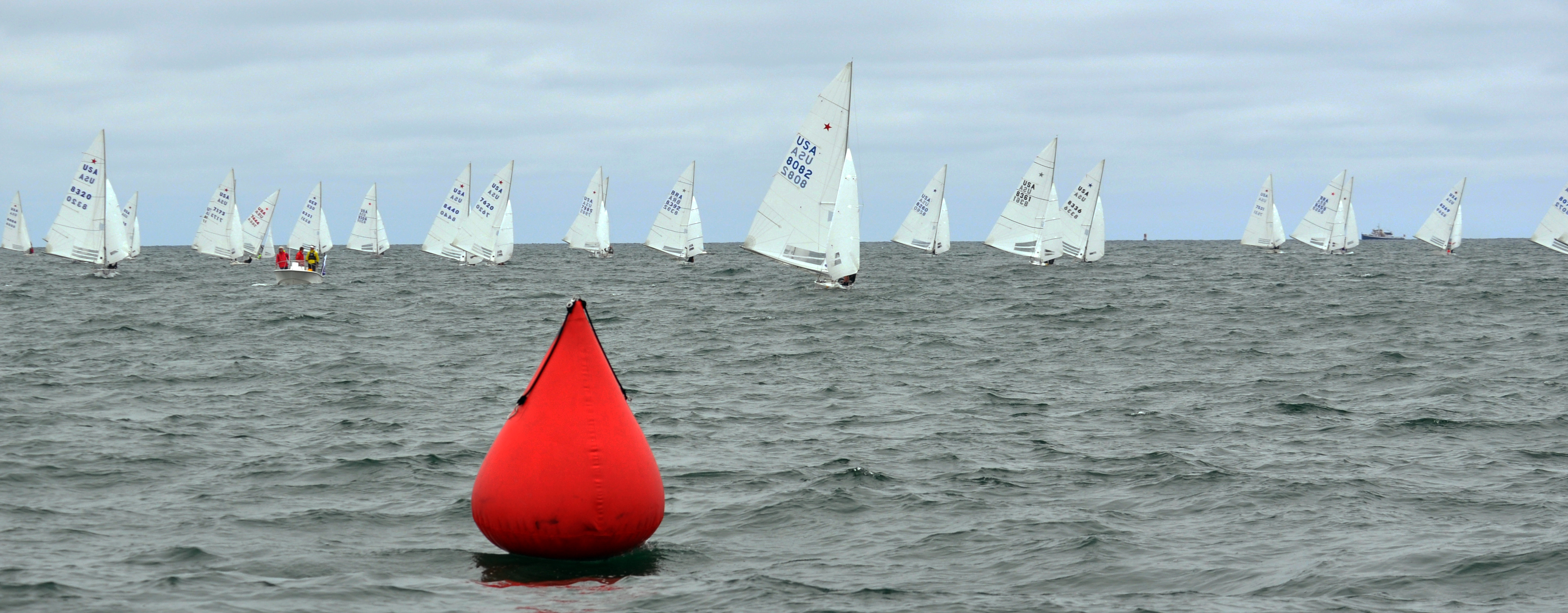
Star Boats North American Championships June 2013

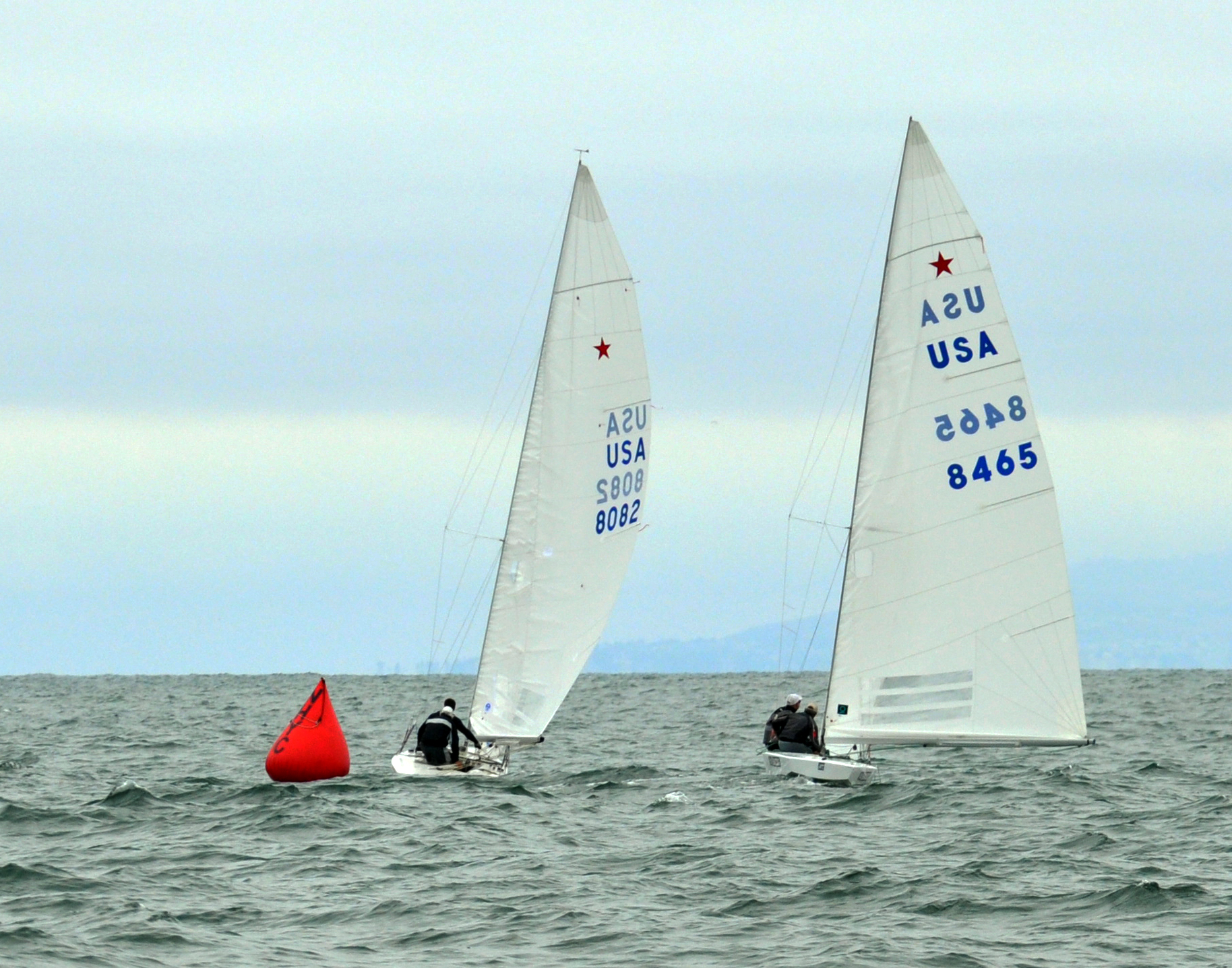
Star Boats NHYC North American Championships June 2013

=== Olympics ===
The Star was added to the Olympic roster for the 1932 Summer Olympics in Los Angeles. Due to World War II, there were no Olympic games held in 1940 or 1944, and for 1976, the Star was replaced by the Tempest for keelboat competition. In 2011 keelboats were removed from sailing at the 2016 Summer Olympics in Rio de Janeiro. The last keelboat Olympics competition was at the 2012 London Summer Olympics.

Games	Gold	Silver	Bronze
1932 Los Angeles: Open	United States; Gilbert Gray; Andrew Libano	Great Britain; George Colin Ratsey; Peter Jaffe	Sweden; Gunnar Asther; Daniel Sundén-Cullberg
1936 Berlin: Open	Germany; Peter Bischoff; Hans-Joachim Weise	Sweden; Arvid Laurin; Uno Wallentin	Netherlands; Bob Maas; Willem de Vries Lentsch
1948 London: Male	United States; Hilary Smart; Paul Smart	Cuba; Carlos de Cárdenas; Carlos de Cárdenas Jr.	Netherlands; Adriaan Maas; Edward Stutterheim
1952 Helsinki: Open	Italy; Agostino Straulino; Nicolò Rode	United States; John Price; John Reid	Portugal; Joaquim Fiúza; Francisco de Andrade
1956 Melbourne: Open	United States; Herbert Williams; Lawrence Low	Italy; Agostino Straulino; Nicolò Rode	Bahamas; Durward Knowles; Sloane Farrington
1960 Rome: Open	Soviet Union; Timir Pinegin; Fyodor Shutkov	Portugal; Mário Quina; José Manuel Quina	United States; William Parks; Robert Halperin
1964 Tokyo: Open	Bahamas; Durward Knowles; Cecil Cooke	United States; Richard Stearns; Lynn Williams	Sweden; Pelle Petterson; Holger Sundström
1968 Mexico City: Open	United States; Lowell North; Peter Barrett	Norway; Peder Lunde Jr. Per Wiken	Italy; Franco Cavallo; Camillo Gargano
1972 Munich: Open	Australia; David Forbes; John Anderson	Sweden; Pelle Petterson; Stellan Westerdahl	West Germany; Wilhelm Kuhweide; Karsten Meyer
1980 Moscow: Open	Soviet Union (URS); Valentin Mankin; Aleksandr Muzychenko	Austria; Hubert Raudaschl; Karl Ferstl	Italy (ITA); Giorgio Gorla; Alfio Peraboni
1984 Los Angeles	United States; William Earl Buchan; Steven Erickson	West Germany; Joachim Griese; Michael Marcour	Italy; Giorgio Gorla; Alfio Peraboni
1988 Seoul: Open	Great Britain; Michael McIntyre; Bryn Vaile	United States; Mark Reynolds; Harold Haenel	Brazil; Torben Grael; Nelson Falcão
1992 Barcelona: Open	United States; Mark Reynolds; Harold Haenel	New Zealand; Rod Davis; Don Cowie	Canada; Ross MacDonald; Eric Jespersen
1996 Atlanta: Open	Brazil; Torben Grael; Marcelo Ferreira	Sweden; Hans Wallén; Bobby Lohse	Australia; Colin Beashel; David Giles
2000 Sydney: Open	United States; Mark Reynolds; Magnus Liljedahl	Great Britain; Ian Walker; Mark Covell	Brazil; Torben Grael; Marcelo Ferreira
2004 Athens: Male	Brazil; Torben Grael; Marcelo Ferreira	Canada; Ross MacDonald; Mike Wolfs	France; Pascal Rambeau; Xavier Rohart
2008 Beijing: Male	Great Britain; Iain Percy; Andrew Simpson	Brazil; Robert Scheidt; Bruno Prada	Sweden; Fredrik Lööf; Anders Ekström
2012 London: Male	Sweden; Fredrik Lööf; Max Salminen	Great Britain; Iain Percy; Andrew Simpson	Brazil; Robert Scheidt; Bruno Prada

=== World Championships ===
The Star World Championships has been held annually since 1923. Most titles has American sailor Lowell North won, with five titles between 1945 and 1973 and another seven podiums. The most crowned skipper-crew combination is Italian duo Agostino Straulino and Nicolò Rode and Brazilian duo Robert Scheidt and Bruno Prada with three titles each. Also, American Mark Reynolds has three titles, but with different crew.

=== Star Vintage Gold Cup ===
The Star Vintage Gold Cup is an annual regatta for vintage Star-class yachts, administered as a sanctioned special event by the International Star Class Yacht Racing Association. Established in 2017, the event is hosted by the Gull Lake Star Fleet and is sailed in vintage Star boats, including restored wooden hulls. In addition to the Vintage Gold Cup trophy, the winner is awarded a gold laurel wreath honor in accordance with Star Class tradition. The laurel wreath may be displayed on the sail and is retained by the recipient following their victory.

=== Star Sailors League ===
The Star Sailors League was created in 2013 by athletes to establish a sustainable sailing circuit.

== Famous Star sailors ==
- Ralph Craig (Olympic 100 and 200 meter Champion: 1912)
- Duarte Bello (Championship competitor, 1947–1970s. Invented auto-bailers and circular boom-vang track)
- John F. Kennedy (Nantucket Sound Star Class Championship: 1936)
- Agostino Straulino (Olympic Champion: 1952; World Champion: 1952, 1953, 1956; Olympic Silver: 1956)
- Robert Halperin (Olympic Bronze: 1960; Pan American Games Gold: 1963)
- Paul Elvstrøm (World Champion: 1966, 1967)
- Dennis Conner (World Champion: 1971, 1977)
- Buddy Melges (World Champion: 1978, 1979)
- Iain Percy (Olympic Champion: 2008; World Champion: 2010; Olympic Silver: 2012)
- Robert Scheidt (Olympic Silver: 2008; Olympic Bronze: 2012; World Champion: 2008, 2011, 2012; SSL Finals: 2013)
- Fredrik Lööf (World Champion: 2001, 2004; Olympic Champion: 2012)

== See also ==
- Comet (dinghy), a smaller and more easily transported sailboat, based upon the Star design
