= List of Star class sailors at the Summer Olympics =

This is list of Star class sailors at the Summer Olympics.

== 1932 Los Angeles ==
Boat name	Helmsman	Crew	Nationality
Windor	Henry Wylie	Henry Simmonds	Canada
Tramontane	Jean-Jacques Herbulot	Jean Peytel	France
Joy	George Colin Ratsey	Peter Jaffe	Great Britain
Holland	Bob Maas	Jan Maas	Netherlands
Springbok	Cecil Goodricke	Arent van Soelen	South Africa
Swedish Star	Gunnar Asther	Daniel Sundén-Cullberg	Sweden
Jupiter	Gilbert Gray	Andrew Libano	United States

== 1936 Berlin ==
Boat name	Helmsman	Crew	Nationality
Freddy	Victor Godts	Albert Vos	Belgium
Fada	Jean-Jacques Herbulot	Pierre de Montaut	France
Wannsee	Peter Bischoff	Hans-Joachim Weise	Germany
Paka	Keith Leslie Grogono	William Rupert Welply	Great Britain
Pegaso	Riccardo De Sangro Fondi	Federico De Luca	Italy
Myojo	Minoru Takarabe	Takuo Mitsui	Japan
BEM II	Bob Maas	Willem de Vries Lentsch	Netherlands
KNS	Øivind Christensen	Sigurd Fredrik Herbern	Norway
Vicking	Joaquim Mascarenhas de Fiúza	António de Herédia	Portugal
Sunshine	Arvid Laurin	Uno Wallentin	Sweden
Marmara	Harun Ülman	Behzat Baydar	Turkey
Three Star Too	William Glenn Waterhouse	Woodbridge Metcalf	United States

== 1948 London ==
Boat name	Helmsman	Crew	Nationality
Acturus	J. Piacentini	A. Carrasco	Argentina
Moorina	Jock Sturrock	Leslie A. Fenton	Australia
Donar III	Georg Obermüller	Hans Schachinger; Horst Obermüller	Austria
Buscape II	João José Bracony	Carlos Melo Bittencourt Filho	Brazil
Ariel	Bill Gooderham	Gerald Fairhead	Canada
Kurush III	Carlos de Cárdenas	Carlos de Cárdenas Jr.	Cuba
Lucky Star	René Israel Nyman	Bror-Christian Ilmoni	Finland
Aloha II	Yves Lorion	Jean Peytel	France
Starita	Durward Knowles	Sloane Elmo Farrington	Great Britain
Nephos I	Georgios Calambokidis	C. Carolou; Nikolaos Vlangalis; Konstantinos Potamianos	Greece
Legionario	Agostino Straulino	Nicolò Rode	Italy
BEM II	Bob Maas	Eddy Stutterheim	Netherlands
Espadarte	Joaquim Fiúza	Júlio Gourinho	Portugal
Galerna	José Luis Allende	Eduardo Aznar Y Coste	Spain
Lotta IV	Bengt Melin	Yngve Engkvist	Sweden
Ali Baba II	Hans Bryner	Kurt Bryner	Switzerland
Hilarious	Hilary Smart	Paul Smart	United States

== 1952 Helsinki ==
Boat name	Helmsman	Crew	Nationality
Arcturus	Jorge Emilio Brauer	Alfredo Vallebona	Argentina
Hornet	Barton Harvey	Kevin Robert Wilson	Australia
30. February	Harald Musil	Harald Fereberger	Austria
Gem III	Durward Knowles	Sloane Elmo Farrington	Bahamas
Bu III	Tacariju de Paula	Cid Nascimento	Brazil
Whirlaway	Douglas Woodward	Andy Hugessen	Canada
Kurush IV	Carlos de Cárdenas	Carlos de Cárdenas Jr.	Cuba
Lucky Star	René Israel Nyman	Bror-Christian Ilmoni	Finland
Eissero VI	Édouard Chabert	Jean-Louis Dauris	France
Paka V	Paul Elmar Fischer	Claus Eckbert Wunderlich	Germany
Fortuna	Stanley Arthur Potter	Trevor Jon Stutely	Great Britain
Marie-Tim	Timoleon Razelos	Andreas Ziro	Greece
Merope	Agostino Straulino	Nicolò Rode	Italy
Hirondelle	Victor Henri de Sigaldi	Michel Auréglia	Monaco
Bem II	Bob Maas	Eddy Stutterheim	Netherlands
Espadarte	Joaquim Mascarenhas de Fiúza	Francisco de Andrade	Portugal
Uragan	Aleksandr Tshumakov	Konstantin Meljgunov	Soviet Union
Lotta IV	Bengt Melin	Börje Carlsson	Sweden
Ali-Baba IV	Hans Robert Bryner	Kurt Bryner	Switzerland
Comanche	John Price	John Reid	United States
Primorka	Mario Fafangeli	Karlo Bašić	Yugoslavia

== 1956 Melbourne ==
Boat name	Helmsman	Crew	Nationality
Covunco III.	Ovidio Manuel Lagos	Jorge Diego Brown	Argentina
Naiad	Robert French	Jack Downey	Australia
Gem IV.	Durward Knowles	Sloane Farrington	Bahamas
Mariana	Eugene Pennell	George Parsons	Canada
Kurush IV.	Carlos de Cárdenas	Jorge de Cárdenas	Cuba
Gam II.	Philippe Chancerel	Michel Parent	France
Starlight III.	Bruce Bernard Banks	Stanley Arthur Potter	Great Britain
Merope III.	Agostino Straulino	Nicolò Rode	Italy
Faneca	Duarte de Almeida Bello	José Bustorff Silva	Portugal
Tulilind	Timir Pinegin	Fyodor Shutkov	Soviet Union
Tichiboo	Prinz Bira Bhanubanda	Luang Pradiyat Navayudh	Thailand
Kathleen	Herbert Williams	Lawrence Low	United States

== 1960 Rome ==
Boat name	Helmsman	Crew	Nationality
Mizar	Roberto C. Mieres	Victor H. Fragola	Argentina
Pakaria	Robert French	Jack Downey	Australia
May-Be 1960	Harald Musil	Franz Eisl	Austria
Gem VII	Durward Knowles	Sloane E. Farrington	Bahamas
Pimm	Jorge Pontual	Cid Nascimento	Brazil
Scram	William Burgess	William West	Canada
Vesania	Jorge de Cárdenas	Carlos de Cárdenas Jr.	Cuba
Bellatrix IX	Fredrik A. Ehrström	Rolf B. A. Zachariassen	Finland
Frip IV	Georges Pisani	Noël M. Desaubliaux	France
Bellatrix IX	Bruno Splieth	Eckart Wagner	United Team of Germany
Twinkle	Roy Mitchell	Jean Mitchell	Great Britain
Zefyros	Nikolaos Vlangalis	Spyros Makridakis	Greece
Olimpia	István Telegdy	István Jutasi	Hungary
Merope III	Agostino Straulino	Carlo Rolandi	Italy
Danaldo	Mizuki Yamada	Yoshimatsu Sakaibara	Japan
Merope	Paul Ripard	John Ripard	Malta
Chamukina	Carlos Braniff	Mauricio de la Lama	Mexico
Ma' Lindo	Mário Quina	José Manuel Quina	Portugal
Tornado	Timir Pinegin	Fyodor Shutkov	Soviet Union
Pasodoble	Carrión José A. Ocejo	Emilio Gurruchaga	Spain
Mari	Sune Carlsson	Per-Olof Karlsson	Sweden
Ali Babà VI	Hans Bryner	Urs-Ulrich Bucher	Switzerland
Siames-Cat	Prince Bira Bhanubanda	Boonpuen Chomvith	Thailand
Shrew II	William W. Parks	Robert Sherman Halperin	United States
Espuma del Mar	Octavio Daniel Camejo	Peter Camejo	Venezuela
Cha-Cha III	Mario Fafangel	Janko Kosmina	Yugoslavia

== 1964 Tokyo ==
Boat name	Helmsman	Crew	Nationality
Rampage	Roberto Sieburger	Arnoldo Pekelharing	Argentina
Maryke	Martinus Visser	Thomas Owens	Australia
Gem	Durward Knowles	Cecil Cooke	Bahamas
Clementine V	Harry Adler	Luiz Ramos	Brazil
Gyoshu II	An Dandara	Kim Tal	Cambodia
Glisten	Dave Miller	William West	Canada
Squid III	Peter Tallberg	Henrik Tallberg	Finland
Bellatrix XIII	Bruno Splieth	Karsten Meyer	United Team of Germany
Umberta V	Luigi Croce	Luigi Saidelli	Italy
Mita II	Masayuki Ishii	Takafumi Okubo	Japan
Nausikaa 4	Carlos Braniff	Andres Gerard	Mexico
Faneca	Duarte de Almeida Bello	Fernando Pinto Coelho Bello	Portugal
Taifun	Timir Pinegin	Fyodor Shutkov	Soviet Union
Humbug V	Pelle Petterson	Holger Sundström	Sweden
Ali-Baba IX	Hans Bryner	Urs-Ulrich Bucher	Switzerland
Glider	Richard Stearns	Lynn Williams	United States
Espuma del Mar	Daniel Camejo	Juan Feld	Venezuela

== 1968 Mexico City ==
Helmsman	Crew	Nationality
Roberto Sieburger	Jorge Vago	Argentina
David Forbes	Richard Williamson	Australia
Durward Knowles	Percival Knowles	Bahamas
Erik Schmidt-Preben	Axel Schmidt-Preben	Brazil
Bruce Kirby	Oswald Blouin	Canada
Paul Elvstrøm	Poul Mik-Meyer	Denmark
Hartmann Bogumil	Udo Springsklee	East Germany
Peter Tallberg	Henrik Tallberg	Finland
Stuart Jardine	James Ramus	Great Britain
Kálmán Tolnai	Laszlo Farkas	Hungary
Franco Cavallo	Camillo Gargano	Italy
Andrés Gerard	Marcos Gerard	Mexico
Peder Lunde Jr.	Per Wiken	Norway
Mário Gentil Quina	José Gentil Quina	Portugal
Timir Pinegin	Fyodor Shutkov	Soviet Union
Juan Alonso Allende	Juan Alonso Aznar	Spain
John Albrechtson	Ulf Norrman	Sweden
Edwin Bernet	Rolf Amrein	Switzerland
Lowell North	Peter Barrett	United States
Eckart Wagner	Fritz Kopperschmidt	West Germany

== 1972 Kiel ==
Helmsman	Crew	Nationality
Guillermo Calegari	Luis Hector Schenone	Argentina
David Forbes	John Anderson	Australia
Manfred Stelzl	Peter Luschan	Austria
Durward Knowles	Montague Roscoe Higgs	Bahamas
Jörg Bruder	Jan Willem Aten	Brazil
Ian Bruce	Peter Björn	Canada
Herbert Weichert	Hans-Joachim Lange	East Germany
Stuart Jardine	John Wastall	Great Britain
András Gosztonyi	György Holovits	Hungary
Flavio Scala	Mauro Testa	Italy
Bjørn Lofterød	Odd Roar Lofterød	Norway
António Correia (sailor)	Ulrich Henrique Anjos	Portugal
Boris Budnikov	Vladimir Vassiliev	Soviet Union
Pelle Petterson	Stellan Westerdahl	Sweden
Edwin Bernet	Rolf Amrein	Switzerland
Alan Holt	Richard Gates	United States
Kenith Klein	Peter B. Jackson	Virgin Islands
Wilhelm Kuhweide	Karsten Meyer	West Germany

== 1980 Moscow ==
Helmsman	Crew	Nationality
Hubert Raudaschl	Karl Ferstl	Austria
Eduardo de Souza Ramos	Peter Erzberger	Brazil
Jens Hakon Christensen	Morten Nielsen	Denmark
Wolf-Eberhard Richter	Olaf Engelhardt	East Germany
Peter Tallberg	Mathias Tallberg	Finland
György Holovits	Tamás Holovits	Hungary
Giorgio Gorla	Alfio Peraboni	Italy
Boudewijn Binkhorst	Kobus Vandenberg	Netherlands
Tomasz Holc	Zbigniew Malicki	Poland
Valentin Mankin	Aleksandr Muzychenko	Soviet Union
Antonio Gorostegui	José Benavides	Spain
Peter Sundelin	Håkan Lindström	Sweden
Jean-Claude Vuithier	Heinz Maurer	Switzerland

== 1984 Los Angeles ==
Helmsman	Crew	Nationality
Colin Beashel	Richard Coxon	Australia
Hubert Raudaschl	Karl Ferstl	Austria
Steven Kelly	Montague Higgs	Bahamas
Howard Palmer	Bruce Bayley	Barbados
Eduardo Ramos	Roberto Souza	Brazil
Lawrence Lemieux	Witold Gesing	Canada
Rodrigo Zuazola	Carlos Rossi	Chile
lain Woolward	John Maddocks	Great Britain
Ilias Hatzipavlis	Leonidas Pelekanakis	Greece
Giorgio Gorla	Alfio Peraboni	Italy
Boudewijn Binkhorst	Willem van Walt Meijer	Netherlands
Antonio Correia	Henrique Anjos	Portugal
Antonio Gorostegui	José Luis Doreste	Spain
Kent Carlson	Henrik Eyermann	Sweden
Josef Steinmayer	Reto Heilig	Switzerland
William E. Buchan	Steven Erickson	United States
John Drew-Bear	Christian Flebbe	Venezuela
John F. Foster Sr.	John Foster Jr.	Virgin Islands
Joachim Griese	Michael Marcour	West Germany

== 1988 Seoul ==
Helmsman	Crew	Nationality
Alberto E. A. Zanetti	Julio A. Labandeira	Argentina
Colin Beashel	Gregory Torpy	Australia
Hubert Raudaschl	Stephan Puxkandl	Austria
Durward Knowles	Steven Kelly	Bahamas
Michael Green	Howard Palmer	Barbados
Torben Grael	Nelson Falcão	Brazil
David Ross MacDonald	Donald Bruce MacDonald	Canada
Anders Geert Jensen	Mogens Just	Denmark
Michael McIntyre	Bryn Vaile	Great Britain
Helias Hadjipavlis	Constandinos Manthos	Greece
Giorgio Gorla	Alfio Peraboni	Italy
Steven Bakker	Kobus Vandenberg	Netherlands
Patrick de Barros	Henrique Anjos	Portugal
Viktor Soloviev	Alexandre Zybine	Soviet Union
Juan Costas	Jose Perez	Spain
Mats Johansson	Mats Hansson	Sweden
Jean-Claude Vuithier	Marco Calderari	Switzerland
Bernd Knuppe	Alejandro Ferreiro	Uruguay
Mark Reynolds	Hal Haenel	United States
John Foster	John Foster Jr.	Virgin Islands
Alexander Hagen	Fritz Girr	West Germany

== 1992 Barcelona ==
Helmsman	Crew	Nationality
Carlo Falcone	Paola Vittoria	Antigua and Barbuda
A. Zanetti Spaggiari	Carlos Felix Gabutti	Argentina
Colin Kenneth Beashel	David James Giles	Australia
Hubert Raudaschl	Friedrich Xaver Gruber	Austria
Steven K. Kelly	William M. Holowesko	Bahamas
Peter Bromby	Paul William Fisher	Bermuda
Torben Grael	Marcelo Ferreira	Brazil
D. Ross Macdonald	Eric Albert Jespersen	Canada
John Patrick Bodden	Byron Timothy Marsh	Cayman Islands
Benny F. Andersen	Mogens Just Mikkelsen	Denmark
Patrick Haegeli	Yannick Adde	France
Hans Vogt	Jörg Fricke	Germany
David John Howlett	Phil Lawrence	Great Britain
Iakovos Kiseoglou	Dimitrios Boukis	Greece
Tibor Tenke	Ferenc Nagy	Hungary
Mark Mansfield	Tom McWilliam	Ireland
Roberto Benamati	Mario Salani	Italy
Mark Neeleman	Jos Schrier	Netherlands
Roderick Hopkins Davis	Donald John Cowie	New Zealand
Fernando Bello	F. Pinheiro De Melo	Portugal
Fernando Rita	Jaime Piris	Spain
Hans Wallén	Bobby Lohse	Sweden
Andreas Bienz	Beat Stegmeier	Switzerland
Gouram BiganichvilI	Vladimer Gruzdevi	Unified Team
Mark J. Reynolds	Hal H. Haenel	United States
John Frederick Foster	John Parry Foster Jr.	Virgin Islands

== 1996 Atlanta ==
Helmsman	Crew	Nationality
Robert Lowrance	Fua Logo Tavui	American Samoa
Guillermo Calegari	Mauro Maiola	Argentina
Colin Beashel	David Giles	Australia
Hubert Raudaschl	Andreas Hanakamp	Austria
Mark Holowesko	Myles Pritchard	Bahamas
Sergey Khoretsky	Vladimir Zuyev	Belarus
Peter Bromby	Lee White	Bermuda
Torben Grael	Marcelo Ferreira	Brazil
Ross MacDonald	Eric Jespersen	Canada
Donald Mclean	Carson Ebanks	Cayman Islands
Michael Hestbæk	Martin Hejlsberg	Denmark
Richard Grönblom	Ville Kurki	Finland
Guram Biganishvili	Vladimer Gruzdevi	Georgia
Frank Butzmann	Kai Falkenthal	Germany
Glyn Charles	George Skuodas	Great Britain
Anastasios Bountouris	Dimitrios Boukis	Greece
Csaba Haranghy	András Komm	Hungary
Mark Mansfield	David Burrows	Ireland
Enrico Chieffi	Roberto Sinibaldi	Italy
Rod Davis	Don Cowie	New Zealand
Diogo Cayolla	Raul Costa	Portugal
Viktor Solovyov	Anatoly Mikhaylin	Russia
José Luis Doreste	Javier Hermida	Spain
Hans Wallén	Bobby Lohse	Sweden
Mark Reynolds	Hal Haenel	United States

== 2000 Sydney ==
Helmsman	Crew	Nationality
Eduardo Farré	Mariano Daniel Lucca	Argentina
Colin Beashel	David Giles	Australia
Peter Bromby	Lee White	Bermuda
Torben Grael	Marcelo Ferreira	Brazil
Ross MacDonald	Kai Bjorn	Canada
Marc Aurel Pickel	Thomas Auracher	Germany
Ian Walker	Mark Covell	Great Britain
Leonidas Pelekanakis	Dimitrios Boukis	Greece
Mark Mansfield	David O'Brien	Ireland
Pietro D'Alì	Ferdinando Colaninno	Italy
Mark Neeleman	Jos Schrier	Netherlands
Gavin Brady	Jamie Gale	New Zealand
José van der Ploeg	Rafael Trujillo	Spain
Mats Johansson	Leif Möller	Sweden
Flavio Marazzi	Renato Marazzi	Switzerland
Mark Reynolds	Magnus Liljedahl	United States

== 2004 Athens ==
Helmsman	Crew	Nationality
Colin Beashel	David Giles	Australia
Hans Spitzauer	Andreas Hanakamp	Austria
Peter Bromby	Lee White	Bermuda
Torben Grael	Marcelo Ferreira	Brazil
David Ross MacDonald	Mike Wolfs	Canada
Nicklas Holm	Claus Olesen	Denmark
Xavier Rohart	Pascal Rambeau	France
Alexander Hagen	Jochen Wolfram	Germany
Iain Percy	Steve Mitchell	Great Britain
Leonidas Pelekanakis	Georgios Kontogouris	Greece
Mark Mansfield	Killian Collins	Ireland
Francesco Bruni	Guido Vignar	Italy
Mark Neeleman	Peter van Niekerk	Netherlands
Roberto Bermúdez	Pablo Arrarte	Spain
Fredrik Lööf	Anders Ekström	Sweden
Flavio Marazzi	Enrico De Maria	Switzerland
Paul Cayard	Phil Trinter	United States

== 2008 Beijing ==
Helmsman	Crew	Nationality
Iain Murray	Andrew Palfrey	Australia
Hans Spitzauer	Hans Christian Nehammer	Austria
Robert Scheidt	Bruno Prada	Brazil
Li Hongquan	Wang He	China
Marin Lovrovic	Siniša Mikuličić	Croatia
Xavier Rohart	Pascal Rambeau	France
Marc Pickel	Ingo Borkowski	Germany
Iain Percy	Andrew Simpson	Great Britain
Peter O'Leary	Stephen Milne	Ireland
Diego Negri	Luigi Viale	Italy
Hamish Pepper	Carl Williams	New Zealand
Mateusz Kusznierewicz	Dominik Życki	Poland
Afonso Domingos	Bernardo Plantier Santos	Portugal
Fredrik Lööf	Anders Ekström	Sweden
Flavio Marazzi	Enrico De Maria	Switzerland
John Dane III	Austin Sperry	United States

== 2012 London ==
Helmsman	Crew	Nationality
Robert Scheidt	Bruno Prada	Brazil
Richard Clarke	Tyler Bjorn	Canada
Marin Lovrović Jr.	Dan Lovrović	Croatia
Michael Hestbæk	Claus Olesen	Denmark
Xavier Rohart	Pierre-Alexis Ponsot	France
Robert Stanjek	Frithjof Kleen	Germany
Iain Percy	Andrew Simpson	Great Britain
Aimilios Papathanasiou	Adonis Tsotras	Greece
Peter O'Leary	David Burrows	Ireland
Hamish Pepper	Jim Turner	New Zealand
Eivind Melleby	Petter Mørland Pedersen	Norway
Mateusz Kusznierewicz	Dominik Życki	Poland
Afonso Domingos	Frederico Melo	Portugal
Fredrik Lööf	Max Salminen	Sweden
Flavio Marazzi	Enrico De Maria	Switzerland
Mark Mendelblatt	Brian Fatih	United States
