= 2000 Star World Championships =

The 2000 Star World Championships were held in Annapolis, United States between May 14 and 20, 2000.

== Results ==
Results of individual races
Pos	Crew	Country	I	II	III	IV	V	VI	Tot	Pts
Gold medal	Mark Reynolds (H); Magnus Liljedahl	United States	1	3	22	3	1	28	58	30
Silver medal	Ross MacDonald (H); Kai Bjorn	Canada	16	2	6	2	113; DNF	19	158	45
Bronze medal	Mark Mansfield (H); David O'Brien	Ireland	10	17	11	30	6	9	83	53
4	Doug Schofield (H); Rob Schofield Jr.	United States	7	6	15	21	64	8	121	57
5	Ian Walker (H); Mark Covell	Great Britain	6	60	8	18	15	10	117	57
6	José Maria van der Ploeg (H); Rafael Trujillo Villar	Spain	14	16	14	9	11	12	76	60
7	Gavin Brady (H); Jamie Gale	New Zealand	5	1	10	52	13	37	118	66
8	Vincent Hoesch (H); Florian Fendt	Germany	15	19	19	8	25	5	91	66
9	Colin Beashel (H); David Giles	Australia	36	31	23	7	3	6	106	70
10	Pietro D'Alì (H); Ferdinando Colaninno	Italy	11	5	31	13	22	21	103	72
11	Ross Adams (H); Chuck Nevel	United States	39	36	7	4	23	4	113	74
12	Mark Neeleman (H); Jos Schrier	Netherlands	17	9	16	26	9	113; DNC	190	77
13	Marc A. Pickel (H); Thomas Auracher	Germany	18	113; DNF	4	44	5	7	191	78
14	Brain Ledbetter (H); Alan Ledbetter	United States	113; DNF	14	5	29	16	15	192	79
15	Flavio Marazzi (H); Renato Marazzi	Switzerland	78	13	3	15	34	26	169	91
16	Peter Bromby (H); Lee White	Bermuda	9	20	26	49	42	2	148	99
17	Eric Doyle (H); Tom Olsen	United States	4	26	34	25	14	31	134	100
18	Torben Schmidt Grael (H); Marcelo Ferreira	Brazil	8	54	32	54	8	3	159	105
19	Frank Butzmann (H); Jens Peters	Germany	25	63	9	28	44	1	170	107
20	Halvor Schøyen (H); Asmund Tharaldsen	Norway	34	24	44	17	18	14	151	107
21	John A. MacCausland (H); Phil Trinter	United States	3	12	37	35	35	21	143	108
22	L. Pelekanakis (H); Dimitrios Boukis	Greece	113; DNF	30	12	31	19	20	225	112
23	Luca Modena (H); Sergio Lambertenghi	Italy	35	18	43	11	21	30	158	115
24	Joe Londrigan (H); Mark Strube	United States	20	79	1	66	7	29	202	123
25	Roberto Benamati (H); Luca Maffezzoli	Italy	19	83	113; OCS	1	2	25	243	130
26	Augie Diaz (H); Rick Peters	United States	27	50	41	24	30	11	183	133
27	Riccardo Simoneschi (H); Marco Marenco	Italy	23	88	40	19	4	57	231	143
28	Roberto Ferrarese (H); Stefano Pisciottu	Italy	65	82	24	14	24	22	231	149
29	Larry Whipple (H); Barry van Leeuwen	United States	113; DNF	46	17	40	29	24	269	156
30	Eduardo Farre (H); Lucca	Argentina	57	67	46	22	31	13	236	169
31	Silvio Santoni (H); Giuseppe Devoti	Italy	41	64	113; DNF	10	37	18	283	170
32	Roeland Wentholt (H); Joost Howeling	Netherlands	24	56	25	27	41	113; DNC	286	173
33	Marko Dahlberg (H); Ville Kurki	Finland	49	21	49	71	26	32	248	177
34	Benny Andersen (H); Mogens Just	Denmark	46	91	2	23	113; DNC	17	292	179
35	Steven Kelly (H); Bill Holowesko	Bahamas	31	44	36	47	28	40	226	179
36	Paolo Semeraro (H); Paolo Fulvio	Italy	51	10	27	33	59	113; DNF	293	180
37	Marin Lovrovic Jr. (H); Marin Lovrovic Sr.	Croatia	43	73	20	69	33	16	254	181
38	Rob Douze (H); Vincent Geysen	Netherlands	30	72	29	12	39	113; DNC	295	182
39	Tony Snell (H); Dave Caesar	Canada	13	22	54	43	66	55	253	187
40	Ingvar Krook (H); Verus Thelander	Sweden	44	15	62	45	32	53	251	189
41	Alberto Zanetti (H); Juan Pablo Engelhard	Argentina	21	42	65	65	20	46	259	194
42	Bill Buchan Jr. (H); Scott Leppert	United States	64	38	113; OCS	6	45	48	314	201
43	Viktor Soloviev (H); Anatoly Mikhailin	Russia	55	49	18	46	81	34	283	202
44	Giampiero Poggi (H); Giovanni Stilo	Italy	113; DNF	32	55	37	43	35	315	202
45	John Finch (H); Kevin Murphy	Canada	54	28	38	36	50	113; DNC	319	206
46	John Virtue (H); Austin Sperry	United States	113; DNF	4	42	78	46	38	321	208
47	Ben Staartjes (H); Ko van den Berg	Netherlands	42	11	58	51	49	58	269	211
48	Jeremy Davidson (H); Jeff Davidson	United States	61	43	39	16	63	113; DNC	335	222
49	Daniel Stegmeier (H); Beat Stegmeier	Switzerland	58	85	13	67	27	59	309	224
50	Carlo Loos (H); Nehammer	Germany	12	113; DSQ	61	80	12	61	339	226
51	Phil Rotermund (H); Tim Krämer	Germany	47	35	21	90	74	51	318	228
52	Federico Strocchi (H); Gianni Torboli	Italy	75	57	28	5	84	66	315	231
53	Giulio Gatti (H); Paolo Busolo	Italy	69	48	45	59	40	43	304	235
54	Lee Kellerhouse (H); Brian Terhaar	United States	28	37	81	72	58	47	323	242
55	Peter Vessella (H); Brian Fatih	United States	29	113; DNF	51	34	17	113; DNC	357	244
56	John Sherwood (H); John Avis	United States	73	55	53	53	47	36	317	244
57	Jimmie Lowe (H); Andrew Higgs	Bahamas	85	94	30	55	55	27	346	252
58	Mats Johansson (H); Leif Moller	Sweden	2	25	113; DSQ	113; DNF	10	113; DNC	376	263
59	Arthur Anosov (H); Chris Rogers	Ukraine	97	58	59	70	36	45	365	268
60	Jon Bartlett (H); Shane Zwingleberg	United States	37	99	47	63	77	44	367	268
61	Kevin McNeil (H); Arnis Baltins	United States	90	65	56	61	52	39	363	273
62	G. Calegari (H); Enrique Irueta	Argentina	99	8	113; OCS	58	62	54	394	281
63	Josh Phypers (H); Ted Lavery	United States	72	41	73	41	70	60	357	284
64	Dave Watt (H); Mike Wurm	United States	113; DSQ	23	113; DNF	48	71	33	401	288
65	Barton Beek (H); Chuck Beek	United States	32	100	77	57	60	64	390	290
66	Peter Costa (H); Jessica Costa	United States	38	90	57	39	95	67	386	291
67	Paul Sustronk (H); Dag Nyhof	Canada	50	76	33	20	113; DSQ	113; DNC	405	292
68	Stefan Lehnert (H); Peter Menning	Germany	66	33	71	42	80	113; DNC	405	292
69	James A. Freeman (H); Eric van Olst	United States	74	87	50	74	54	41	380	293
70	Jack Rickard (H); Bob Carlson	United States	96	40	74	62	75	49	396	300
71	John Vanderhoff (H); Rowan Perkins	United States	40	52	89	113; DSQ	69	50	413	300
72	James Allsopp (H); Jim Kavle	United States	113; OCS	29	78	32	57	113; DNC	422	309
73	Manuel Bunge (H); Marco Lagoa	Brazil	48	92	113; DNF	77	53	42	425	312
74	Eizens Cepurnieks (H); A. Muziceniko	Latvia	77	81	52	73	48	63	394	313
75	Antonio Tamburini (H); Renzo Ricci	Italy	62	45	72	97	76	62	414	317
76	Drik Sommer Jr. (H); Lars Kiewning	Germany	22	47	113; DNF	113; DNF	68	68	431	318
77	Mitja Kosmina (H); Evgenji Komlianec	Slovenia	33	7	113; DNF	85	85	113; DNC	436	323
78	Klaus Meyer (H); Jens Hannemann	Germany	79	62	48	79	61	113; DNC	442	329
79	David Chittick (H); Mike Whitford	United States	76	66	60	99	79	74	454	355
80	Gene McCarthy (H); Glenn McCarthy	United States	91	39	93	68	65	113; DNC	469	356
81	Steve Braverman (H); Ron Rezac	United States	56	68	76	89	113; DSQ	69	471	358
82	Bill Culberson (H); Matt Mowad	United States	59	84	80	64	73	113; DNC	473	360
83	Rick Dhein (H); Keith Gardner	United States	84	98	95	93	38	52	460	362
84	Elliott Oldak (H); Sean Delaney	United States	100	74	68	75	90	56	463	363
85	John Lombard (H); Kurt Larson	United States	113; DNF	27	113; OCS	76	83	65	477	364
86	John Foster (H); Michael Lawlor	U.S. Virgin Islands	71	89	67	81	56	113; DNC	477	364
87	Richard Burgess (H); John Wulff	United States	63	105	35	84	78	113; DNC	478	365
88	Steve Kling (H); Calthorp	United States	52	104	84	38	88	113; DNC	479	366
89	Kim Fletcher (H); Kyle Henehan	United States	86	51	82	60	94	113; DNC	486	373
90	J. Svendsen (H); J.C. Jurlander	Denmark	26	70	69	96	113; DSQ	113; DNC	487	374
91	Carlo Falcone (H); Shannon Falcone	Netherlands Antilles	45	113; DNF	86	87	51	113; DNC	495	382
92	Guy Brierre (H); Buddy Clarke	United States	53	59	113; DNF	94	72	113; DNC	504	391
93	John Chiarella (H); Terry Fletcher	United States	60	77	113; OCS	100	82	73	505	392
94	John Jenkins (H); Will Bacon	United States	70	69	64	98	93	113; DNC	507	394
95	J. Joseph Bainton (H); Bowne	United States	87	93	63	95	67	113; DNC	518	405
96	Rick Brethorst (H); Mark Lewis	United States	80	61	66	91	113; DNF	113; DNC	524	411
97	Jeff Schaefer (H); John Goode	United States	67	75	70	113; DSQ	96	113; DNC	534	421
98	Christian Scheinecker (H); Gerd Habermueller	Austria	113; OCS	34	113; DNF	56	113; DNF	113; DNC	542	429
99	Jack Button (H); Chris Batchelor	United States	93	101	79	92	97	72	534	433
100	Joseph Pro (H); Guy Avellon	United States	82	103	91	88	113; DSQ	71	548	435
101	Dierk Thomsen (H); Jakob Just	Germany	92	80	92	82	92	113; DNC	551	438
102	Wulf Kahl (H); Theo Petersen	Germany	95	97	75	83	91	113; DNC	554	441
103	John J. Bainton Jr. (H); Will Christenson	United States	113; DNF	107	97	50	87	113; DNC	567	454
104	Juan Percossi (H); Gabriel Meyer	Argentina	68	78	83	113; DSQ	113; DNF	113; DNC	568	455
105	Roger Turner (H); Tony Collard	United States	98	71	94	103	89	113; DNC	568	455
106	Davis Buckley (H); Gregory Gahlinger	United States	88	53	90	113; DNC	113; DNC	113; DNC	570	457
107	Jukka Jaskari (H); Mikael Wahrn	Finland	89	95	85	86	113; DNF	113; DNC	581	468
108	Steve Andrews (H); Ailene Rogers	United States	113; DNF	106	96	104	98	70	587	474
109	Throny Cook (H); Mike Young	United States	113; DNF	86	87	102	86	113; DNC	587	474
110	Brad Anderson (H); Ryan Smith	Canada	83	96	88	105	113; DNF	113; DNC	598	485
111	Larry Parrotta (H); Scott Karr	United States	94	102	98	101	113; DNF	113; DNC	621	508
112	Renato Irrera (H); A. Calbarella	Italy	113; MAN	113; DSQ	113; DSQ	113; DSQ	113; DSQ	113; DSQ	678	565

Legend: DNC – Did not come to the starting area; DNF – Did not finish; DSQ – Disqualified; OCS – On the course side of the starting line;
