= 1967 Star World Championship =

Event title
- Edition: 45th
- Host: Skovshoved Sejlklub

Event details
- Venue: Skovshoved
- Yachts: Star
- Titles: 1

Competitors
- Competitors: 124
- Competing nations: 15

Results
- (gold) Gold: (Denmark) Elvstrøm & Mik-Meyer
- (silver) Silver: (United States) North & Barrett
- (bronze) Bronze: (United States) Trask & Kreysler

The 1967 Star World Championship was held in Skovshoved, Copenhagen, Denmark in 1967, organised by Skovshoved Sejlklub.

Danish Paul Elvstrøm defended his title from the 1966 Star World Championship.

== Results ==
Results of individual races
Pos	Boat name	Crew	Country	I	II	III	IV	V	Tot
Gold medal	Scandale	Paul Elvstrøm; Poul Mik-Meyer	Denmark	2	12	4	5	4	288
Silver medal	North Star	Lowell North; Peter Barrett	United States	5	4	2	2	17	285
Bronze medal	Swingin' Star	Donald J. Trask; William Kreysler	United States	10	5	1	14	2	283
4	Star of the Sea	Joseph R. Duplin; Francis Dolan	United States	8	1	13	6	5	282
5	Humbug VI	Pelle Petterson; Stellan Westerdahl	Sweden	7	19	6	4	1	278
6	Taphoon	Timir Pinegin; Fyodor Shutkov	Soviet Union	1	6	3	8	20	277
7	Glider	Richard Stearns; Lynn Williams	United States	4	10	12	28	10	251
8	Good Grief!	Tom Blackaller; Gary Mull	United States	19	16	16	1	13	250
9	Osprey XI	Erik Schmidt; Axel Schmidt	Brazil	30	3	7	16	11	248
10	Subbnboana	Eckart Wagner; Fritz Kopperschmidt	West Germany	13	17	5	29	3	247
11	Blue Monk	Göran Tell; Börje Larsson	Sweden	34	2	15	9	12	243
12	Shrew VII	William Parks; Robert Halperin	United States	20	20	17	3	15	240
13	Argo	Vladimir Vasilyev; Eduard Shugai	Soviet Union	15	13	23	11	19	234
14	Ma' Lindo	Mário Quina; Francisco Quina	Portugal	14	11	30	15	27	218
15	Hilarius	Hilary Smart; John C. Weston	United States	22	22	20	20	14	217
16	Mystere	Edwin Bernet; Rolf Amrein	Switzerland	25	39	31	7	6	207
17	Zucker Kaninchen	Chuck Lewsadder; Kim Fletcher	United States	6	18	9	17	DNS	202
18	Hannah	Barton S. Beek; Ron Anderson	United States	17	23	22	12	9	202
19	Squid IV	Peter Tallberg; Henrik Tallberg	Finland	3	29	19	40	36	193
20	Hero	Uwe von Below; Will von Below	West Germany	24	14	26	44	16	191
21	Chatterbox	Malin Burnham; James Reynolds	United States	11	8	18	25	DNF	190
22	Desiree	Carlo Rolandi; Angelo Marino	Italy	12	45	37	23	8	190
23	Roulette III	Lars Bjerkander; Hans Hultman	Sweden	21	26	8	47	25	188
24	Krangel	John Albrechtson; Ulf Norrman	Sweden	17	32	WDR	10	7	187
25	Umberta VI	Luigi Croce; Carlo Croce	Italy	40	15	19	27	34	185
26	Cherie VI	Rudi Bechtold; Ludwig Buedel	West Germany	9	38	21	53	33	161
27	Ta Fatt VII	Jacob Engwall; Anders Holmgren	Sweden	36	33	11	46	30	159
28	Star de la Cote	J. C. de Bokay; Paul Badelon	France	16	DSQ	34	26	21	155
29	Monique	K. A. Rydqvist; Sune Carlsson	Sweden	29	7	DSQ	36	26	154
30	Blott IX	Max Kastinger; Peter Schaup	Austria	49	46	32	13	23	152
31	Clambambes	Peter Adolff; Hans Morrell	West Germany	23	31	46	19	45	151
32	Chantal	Ricco Giesbrecht; Gubi Leemann	Switzerland	18	28	44	37	40	148
33	Snafu	Stuart Jardine; James Ramus	Great Britain	26	30	28	48	35	148
34	Nuppes	Peter Engler; Karl Gehringer	West Germany	44	9	35	41	38	148
35	Nappis-Ueli	Paul J. Bischof; Albert Lechner	West Germany	39	56	27	22	24	147
36	Pummel VII	Detlef Kuke; Christian Koch	West Germany	31	37	DSQ	18	22	144
37	Ginger	David J. Forbes; Ronald S. Toft	Australia	38	41	10	21	DNF	142
38	Peau de Chagrin	Andre Chaudoye; Christian Buguel	France	57	35	24	30	41	128
39	Bumser III	S. Scheuregger; Hans H. Geim	West Germany	58	43	29	32	29	124
40	Bahia IV	Herman Thelen; Carl-Johan Ådahl	Finland	27	44	41	52	28	123
41	Toucas	Jose Q. Saldanha; Espirito Santo	Portugal	43	23	40	43	49	117
42	Goggolori	Peter Schmid; Rainer Schmid	West Germany	28	48	49	31	44	115
43	Domino	Hanspeter Roost; Heinz Sager	Switzerland	32	34	25	49	DNF	112
44	Fair Lady	Hannes Schwarz; Heinz Loichinger	West Germany	48	21	39	35	DNF	109
45	Lotus	Hans Hedlund; Sven Hedlund	Sweden	33	54	51	54	18	105
46	Clementine	Harry Adler; Daniel Schwartz	Brazil	42	27	42	39	DNF	102
47	Espuma del Mar	Daniel Camejo; Juan Feld	Venezuela	62	49	33	42	31	98
48	Pummel	Michael Kuke; Herbert Baer	West Germany	46	50	45	38	39	97
49	Colomba IV	A. Osterwalder; Werner Landau	Switzerland	35	57	50	34	42	97
50	Alnilan	Klaus Zistl; Peter Stockmayr	West Germany	36	WDR	24	43		90
51	Baladin	U. Strohschneider; Peter Denzel	Austria	37	58	47	45	50	78
52	Jessica	G. Scheder-B. Hinner Entzian	Portugal	52	35	DSQ	33	DSQ	78
53	Delphin	Rudolf Lange; Karl Heitzinger	Austria	41	DNS	55	55	37	64
54	Ballett	Jan Andersson; Hans Bernström	Sweden	50	51	43	59	48	64
55	Epoca	Dieter Laubmann; Karl H. Laubmann	West Germany	55	42	36	50	47	63
56	Bahia II	Georges Mueller; Mario Dengler	Switzerland	56	47	WDR	56	32	61
57	Gratia II	H. J. Finkeldei; Rolf Roettger	West Germany	54	52	38	51	DSQ	57
58	Katia III	Michel Gautier; Gerard Dubout	France	45	53	54	57	51	55
59	Schambes	Ludwig M. Knoll; H. Michels	West Germany	51	40	52	60	DNF	49
60	Claudia II	K. Nordenberg; Carl Nordenberg	Sweden	52	55	48	58	DSQ	39
61	Perhaps	Jørgen Herlevsen; Klaus Linbaek	Denmark	61	59	53	WDR	46	33
62	Boeing	Ingvar Jonsson; Bo Olofsson	Sweden	60	DNS	WDR	DNS	DNS	3

Legend: DNF – Did not finish; DNS – Did not start; DSQ – Disqualified; WDR – Withdrew;
