= 2004 Star World Championships =

The 2004 Star World Championship was held in Gaeta, Italy between April 23 and May 1, 2004.

== Results ==
Results of individual races
Pos	Crew	Country	I	II	III	IV	V	VI	Tot	Pts
Gold medal	Fredrik Lööf (H); Anders Ekström	Sweden	3	2	7	3	8	27^{†}	50	23
Silver medal	Flavio Marazzi (H); Enrico De Maria	Switzerland	4	56^{†}	8	13	3	4	88	32
Bronze medal	Iain Percy (H); Steve Mitchell	Great Britain	1	22	2	9	4	28^{†}	66	38
4	Mark Neeleman (H); Peter van Niekerk	Netherlands	10	1	1	19	11	29^{†}	71	42
5	Paul Cayard (H); Phil Trinter	United States	103^{†} DNF OCS	8	14	15	2	3	145	42
6	Peter Bromby (H); Lee White	Bermuda	16	3	5	11	10	103^{†} DNS	148	45
7	Roberto Bermudez (H); Pablo Arrarte	Spain	6	15	6	28^{†}	13.8; RDG	13.8; RDG	82.6	54.6
8	Stig Westergaard (H); Dann Neergaard	Denmark	9	12	17	36^{†}	20	2	96	60
9	Xavier Rohart (H); Pascal Rambeau	France	103^{†} OCS	26	20	2	9	6	166	63
10	Roy Heiner (H); Alex Breuseker	Netherlands	20^{†}	11	13	12	13	15	84	64
11	Mark Mansfield (H); Killian Collins	Ireland	2	16	37^{†}	6	19	22	102	65
12	Ross MacDonald (H); Mike Wolfs	Canada	21	17	36^{†}	5	17	5	101	65
13	Colin Beashel (H); David Giles	Australia	8	43^{†}	3	18	5	33	110	67
14	Maxwell Treacy (H); Anthony Shanks	Ireland	5	6	103^{†} DNF	27	16	18	175	72
15	Torben Grael (H); Marcelo Bastos Ferreira	Brazil	7	4	4	34	103^{†} DNF	26	178	75
16	Leonidas Pelekanakis (H); George Kodogouris	Greece	15	10	21	23	33^{†}	7	109	76
17	Francesco Bruni (H); Guido Antar Vigna	Italy	13	59^{†}	12	26	6	24	140	81
18	Mark Pickel (H); Ingo Borkovski	Germany	14	13	33	10	12	36^{†}	118	82
19	Rohan Lord (H); Andrew Taylor	New Zealand	11	9	25	17	22	41^{†}	125	84
20	Mark Reynolds (H); Steve Erickson	United States	103^{†} OCS	31	18	16	1	21	190	87
21	George Szabo (H); Christian Finnsgård	United States	103^{†} DNF	32.2; DNC RDG	11	1	23	23	193.2	90.2
22	Alexander Hagen (H); Jochen Wolfram	Germany	19	27^{†}	23	4	21	25	119	92
23	Iain Murray (H); Andrew Palfrey	Australia	23	64^{†}	34	22	7	11	161	97
24	Jali Makila (H); Erkki Heinonen	Finland	26	19	9	30	103^{†} DNF	13	200	97
25	Alfonso Domingos (H); Bernardo Santos	Portugal	12	36	103^{†} OCS	24	18	14	207	104
26	Hans Spitzauer (H); Andreas Hanakamp	Austria	25	39^{†}	32	14	24	10	144	105
27	Michael Koch (H); Markus Koy	Germany	28	20	29	51^{†}	28	1	157	106
28	Pietro Dali (H); Piero Romeo	Italy	65^{†}	18	10	40	27	19	179	114
29	Niklas David Holm (H); Claus Olesen	Denmark	103^{†} DNF	40	26	20	14	16	219	116
30	Marin Lovrovic Jr. (H); Marin Lovrovic Sr.	Croatia	36^{†}	7	31	35	36	9	154	118
31	Giampiero Poggi (H); Giovanni Stilo	Italy	22	14	16	41^{†}	39	32	164	123
32	Julio Labandeira (H); Valentin Thomsom	Argentina	29	32	15	21	31	37^{†}	165	128
33	Daniel Stegmeier (H); Beat Stegmeier	Switzerland	31	5	42	8	46	52^{†}	184	132
34	Mahesh Ramchandran (H); Nitin Mongia	India	35^{†}	29	35	32	25	12	168	133
35	Stayros Aleyras (H); George Stylianos	Greece	30	50^{†}	28	25	43	8	184	134
36	Ferdinando Colaninno (H); Giuseppe Brizzi	Italy	18	34	24	37	32	61^{†}	206	145
37	Hubert Merkelbach (H); Oliver Vitzthum	Germany	17	68^{†}	22	33	26	48	214	146
38	Paolo Semeraro (H); Vittorio Landolfi	Italy	32	53^{†}	19	43	29	35	211	158
39	Nicola Celon (H); Sergio Lambertenghi	Italy	27	63	45	7	34	103^{†} DNS	279	176
40	Sergey Pitchugin (H); Sergey Timokhov	Ukraine	40	35	48	49^{†}	37	17	226	177
41	Philipp Rotermund (H); Markus Mehles	Germany	39	25	68^{†}	48	35	39	254	186
42	Georgy Shayduko (H); Nikolai Smirnow	Russia	103^{†} OCS	41	47	44	41	20	296	193
43	Roeland Wentholt (H); Gert Van Der Heidjen	Netherlands	54^{†}	28	39	38	49	49	257	203
44	Giulio Gatti (H); Corrado Cristallini	Italy	42	24	75^{†}	42	52	50	285	210
45	Luca Simeone (H); Leone Rocca	Italy	44	30	57^{†}	53	51	34	269	212
46	Marko Dahlberg (H); Ville Kurki	Finland	47	37	40	66^{†}	44	44	278	212
47	Albino Fravezzi (H); Mario Salani	Italy	37	44	46	47	40	103^{†} DNS	317	214
48	Juan Kouyoumdjian (H); Austin Sperry	Argentina	38	66^{†}	38	52	42	45	281	215
49	Theodore Tsoulfas (H); Jakovos Loudaros	Greece	60	23	30	45	70^{†}	64	292	222
50	Tibor Tenke (H); Jozsef Bendicsek	Hungary	33	74^{†}	27	49.4; RDG	47	66	296.4	222.4
51	Michael Jones (H); Peter Merrington	Australia	34	55	41	54	58^{†}	40	282	224
52	Enrico Chieffi (H); Agostino Sommariva	Italy	43	21	103^{†} OCS	29	30	103; DNS	329	226
53	Alberto Zanetti (H); Mariano Lucca	Argentina	103^{†} DNF	71	43	57	45	30	349	246
54	Valerio Chinca (H); Massimo Ciano	Italy	103^{†} DNF	59; DNC RDG	56	31	62	43	354	251
55	Pierpaolo Cristofori (H); Carlo Fogliazza	Italy	45	52	81	103^{†} DSQ	48	38	367	264
56	Alejandro Chometowski (H); Manuel Bunge	Argentina	49	47	74^{†}	50	66	56	342	268
57	Ante Razmilovic (H); Edmund Peel	Great Britain	48	48	103^{†} DNF	62	53	59	373	270
58	Vitaly Tarakanov (H); Alexey Bushvev	Russia	58	45	51	60	61^{†}	57	332	271
59	Stefano Fusco (H); Alessandro Meloni	Italy	72	58	62^{†}	58	55	42	347	275
60	Lucio Boggi (H); Andrea Tarabella	Italy	59	69^{†}	55	58.6; RDG	63	47	351.6	282.6
61	Yuri Firsov (H); Sergei Kramskoi	Russia	103^{†} OCS	84	49	68	60	31	395	292
62	Regis Berenguier (H); Vincent Berenguier	France	103^{†} DNF	62	69	56	54	51	395	292
63	Ronald Palleschitz (H); Gerhard Weinreich	Austria	68	61	72^{†}	64	56	46	367	295
64	Daniel Wyss (H); Brian Fatih	Switzerland	66	103^{†} DNC	59	65	59	54	406	303
65	Pieter Jongerius (H); Freark Zandstra	Netherlands	55	103^{†} DNC	44	71	71	63	407	304
66	Roberto Benamati (H); Filippo Domenicali	Italy	103^{†} OCS	54	103; OCS	39	15	103; DNS	417	314
67	Luca Filippi (H); Paolo Cisbani	Italy	46	67	84^{†}	75	69	58	399	315
68	Vasyl Gureyev (H); Volodymyr Korotkov	Ukraine	24	33	53	103^{†} DNF	103; DNF	103; DNF	419	316
69	Marco Minghetti (H); Nicolas Moget	Italy	103^{†} DNF OCS	70.8; DNC RDG	54	63	65	69	424.8	321.8
70	Paolo Nazzaro (H); Riccardo Marullo	Italy	64	75	78^{†}	69	50	65	401	323
71	Ingvar Krook (H); Erik Gamner	Sweden	57	83	67	59	57	103^{†} DNS	426	323
72	Eizens Cepurnieks (H); Alexander Muzicenko	Latvia	50	70	85	70	103^{†} DNF	53	431	328
73	Alexey Lavrov (H); Alexander Kuleshov	Russia	79	42	80	61	103^{†} DNF	67	432	329
74	Riccardo Simoneschi (H); Mario Marenco	Italy	41	103^{†} DNF	103; DNC	46	38	103; DNF	434	331
75	Joni Leeve (H); Timo Lamberg	Finland	71	65	79^{†}	77	72	60	424	345
76	Davide Degennaro (H); Stefano Pisciottu	Italy	62	75.2; DNC RDG	70	76	64	103^{†} DNS	450.2	347.2
77	Peter Katay (H); Nazer Csaba	Hungary	74	73	76	86^{†}	75	55	439	353
78	Sune Carlsson (H); Benny Nilsson	Sweden	61	72	82	78	67	103^{†} DNS	463	360
79	Andrea Racchelli (H); Massimiliano Ferrari	Italy	53	57	52	103^{†} DNF	103; DNF	103; DNS	471	368
80	Marco Testa (H); Livio Giacummo	Italy	67	103^{†} DNC	60	72	103; DNF	68	473	370
81	Henrik Dannesboe (H); Antoine Lombard	Switzerland	103^{†} DNF	51	61	55	103; DNF	103; DNS	476	373
82	Nello Oliviero (H); Daniele Pisa	Italy	103^{†} DNF OCS	38	63	67	103; DNF	103; DNS	477	374
83	Christian Paucksh (H); Peter Andra	Germany	77	82	88^{†}	74	73	70	464	376
84	Hans Stockli (H); Axel Erbe	Switzerland	78	80	66	81	74	103^{†} DNS	482	379
85	Eugen Avksentiev (H); Mykola Shapovalov	Ukraine	51	60	71	103^{†} DNF	103; DNF	103; DNS	491	388
86	Antoni Balderi (H); Amerigo Anguillesi	Italy	81	85	90^{†}	85	76	62	479	389
87	Hubert Rauch (H); Christian Conrads	Germany	80	78	50	80	103^{†} DNF	103; DNS	494	391
88	Renato Irrera (H); Federico Medolago	Italy	75	81	89	82	68	103^{†} DNS	498	395
89	Roman Timm (H); Kaspar Huber	Switzerland	73	76	65	83	103^{†} DNF	103; DNS	503	400
90	Andreas Oehlwein (H); Gert Matushek	Austria	69	77	83	73	103^{†} DNF	103; DNS	508	405
91	Christoph Gautschi (H); Uli Seeberger	Switzerland	52	46	103^{†} OCS	103; DNF	103; DNF	103; DNS	510	407
92	Bostjan Antoncic (H); Gennadi Strahk	Slovenia	63	49	103^{†} DNF	103; DNF	103; DNF	103; DNS	524	421
93	Albert Sturm (H); Bernhard Rottner	Austria	56	88.4; DNC RDG	77	103^{†} DNF	103; DNF	103; DNS	530.4	427.4
94	Claude Bonanni (H); Steve Cutting	United States	103^{†} DNF	79	58	103; DNF	103; DNF	103; DNS	549	446
95	Marc Friedrich (H); Paul De Wit	Switzerland	103^{†} DNF	103; DNF	73	84	103; DNF	103; DNS	569	466
96	Salvatore Pisanelli (H); Massimo Fullone	Italy	76	103^{†} DNC	87	103; DNF	103; DNF	103; DNS	575	472
97	Pierpaolo Di Russo (H); Pierluigi Lucciola	Italy	103^{†} DNF	103; DNF	86	79	103; DNF	103; DNS	577	474
98	Andreas Denk (H); Wolfang Brenner	Austria	103^{†} DNF	103; DNC	64	103; DNF	103; DNF	103; DNS	579	476
99	Walter Passenger (H); Martin Kropfitsch	Austria	70	103^{†} DNC	103; DNF	103; DNF	103; DNF	103; DNS	585	482
100	Klaus Kapper (H); Steffen Rutz	Germany	103^{†} DNF	83; DNC RDG	103; OCS	103; DNF	103; DNF	103; DNS	598	495
101	Riccardo Improta (H); Andrea Lupoli	Italy	103^{†} DNF	103; DNC	103; DNF	103; DNF	103; DNF	103; DNS	618	515
101	Antonio Tamburrini (H); Renzo Ricci	Italy	103^{†} OCS	103; DNC RDG	103; OCS	103; DNF	103; DNF	103; DNS	618	515

Legend: DNC – Did not come to the starting area; DNF – Did not finish; DNS – Did not start; DSQ – Disqualified; OCS – On the course side of the starting line; RDG – Redress given;
