= 1962 Star World Championship =

Event title
- Edition: 40th

Event details
- Venue: Cascais, Portugal
- Yachts: Star
- Titles: 1

Competitors
- Competitors: 146
- Competing nations: 19

Results
- (gold) Gold: (United States) Stearns & Williams
- (silver) Silver: (Portugal) Bello & Bello
- (bronze) Bronze: (United States) Etchells & Allan

The 1962 Star World Championship was held in Cascais, Portugal in 1962.

== Results ==
Results of individual races
| Pos | Boat name | Crew | Country | I | II | III | IV | V | Tot |
|---|---|---|---|---|---|---|---|---|---|
| Gold medal | Glider | Richard Stearns; Lynn Williams | United States | 4 | 3 | 4 | 6 | 6 | 347 |
| Silver medal | Faneca | Duarte de Almeida Bello; Fernando Bello | Portugal | 3 | 5 | 1 | 12 | 10 | 339 |
| Bronze medal | Shanty | E. W. Etchells; Robert M. Allan III | United States | 16 | 9 | 11 | 2 | 1 | 331 |
| 4 | Frolic | Bill Buchan Jr. Douglas Knight | United States | 14 | 1 | 14 | 9 | 9 | 323 |
| 5 | Cyrano | Joseph G. Burbeck; Donald Dowd | United States | 2 | 2 | 30 | 5 | 14 | 317 |
| 6 | Big Daddy | Donald K. Edler; Kent D. Edler | United States | 5 | 4 | 26 | 7 | 13 | 315 |
| 7 | Espadarte | Joaquim Fiúza; Jose Reis | Portugal | 7 | 12 | 3 | 11 | 22 | 315 |
| 8 | Tornado | Timir Pinegin; Fyodor Shutkov | Soviet Union | 1 | 30 | 39 | 1 | 3 | 296 |
| 9 | Cirrus | Howard Lippincott; W. Mason Shehan | United States | 11 | 8 | 41 | 8 | 7 | 295 |
| 10 | Ma' Lindo | Mário Quina; Francisco Quina | Portugal | 35 | 10 | 23 | 15 | 2 | 285 |
| 11 | Dingo | Ding Schoonmaker; John Boyer | United States | 29 | 14 | 31 | 13 | 4 | 279 |
| 12 | Razor | Robert Lippincott; Robert Halperin | United States | 9 | 31 | 35 | 3 | 17 | 275 |
| 13 | Illusion | Paul E. Fischer; Kai Krüger | West Germany | 6 | 38 | 34 | 17 | 8 | 267 |
| 14 | Mystere | Edwin Bernet; J. Peter Schmid | Switzerland | 8 | 40 | 6 | 26 | 24 | 266 |
| 15 | Gale | Harry Gale Nye Jr. John B. Lechner | United States | 12 | 16 | 37 | 10 | 31 | 264 |
| 16 | Flying Star V | Lars Berg; Göran Tell | Sweden | 22 | 19 | 2 | 35 | 30 | 262 |
| 17 | Vagspel | Börje Larsson; Göran Dahl | Sweden | 27 | 27 | 7 | 19 | 28 | 262 |
| 18 | North Star IV | Lowell North; Kim Fletcher | United States | 15 | 11 | 10 | WDR | 12 | 248 |
| 19 | Tantrum | Samuel S. Beard; James Black | United States | 21 | 25 | WDR | 4 | 11 | 235 |
| 20 | Evergreen II | Bengt G. Elfvin; Holger Sundström | Sweden | 30 | 42 | 15 | 18 | 32 | 233 |
| 21 | Flamingo IV | Paul Woodbury; Joseph Duplin | United States | 31 | 23 | 8 | DSA | 5 | 229 |
| 22 | Tijuca | Charles W. Lyon Jr. Frank G. Lyon | United States | 41 | 29 | 25 | 27 | 21 | 227 |
| 23 | Brise | Angelo Marino; Arnaldo Panico | Italy | 18 | 20 | 47 | 14 | 45 | 226 |
| 24 | Caprice | Carlo Rolandi; Alfonso Marino | Italy | 39 | 32 | 12 | 47 | 20 | 220 |
| 25 | Merope III | Franco Cavallo; Vincenso Fania | Italy | 40 | 44 | 28 | 16 | 23 | 219 |
| 26 | Cam III | Philippe Chancerel; Michel Parent | France | 13 | 7 | 32 | 25 | DSQ | 219 |
| 27 | Alvo II | Charles H. Dole; Everett Temme | United States | 33 | 33 | 45 | 23 | 19 | 217 |
| 28 | Umberta V | Luigi Croce; Luigi Saidelli | Italy | 19 | 52 | 16 | 31 | 41 | 211 |
| 29 | Pimm | Walter von Hütschler; Gerd Fisher | Brazil | 37 | 6 | 20 | 52 | 44 | 211 |
| 30 | Mechtild | Josef Pankofer; Eckart Wagner | West Germany | 17 | 18 | 21 | DSQ | 35 | 205 |
| 31 | Frip | Georges Pisani; Noël Desaubliaux | France | 50 | 46 | 5 | 44 | 34 | 191 |
| 32 | Pakaria | Robert J. Smith; K. Mumford | Australia | 46 | 24 | 64 | 20 | 27 | 189 |
| 33 | Malabar | Jorge Pontual; Cid Nascimento | Brazil | 23 | 15 | 57 | DNF | 15 | 186 |
| 34 | Katia II | Michel Gautier; Fernand Thieck | Morocco | 28 | 55 | 36 | 40 | 26 | 185 |
| 35 | Merry | Erich Schrauder; Gubi Leemann | Switzerland | DSQ | 21 | 19 | 32 | 40 | 184 |
| 36 | Cetus | Bonar Davis; Charles Rickard | Canada | 45 | 34 | 27 | 42 | 43 | 179 |
| 37 | Petrea VII | Peter Hansohm; Duwald Dotzer | West Germany | 56 | 47 | 18 | 22 | 48 | 179 |
| 38 | Gipsy | Lars-Johan Nygren; C.-J. Fogelholm | Finland | 10 | 43 | 49 | WDR | 16 | 178 |
| 39 | Noni | A. Mardel Correia; Antonio Rocha | Portugal | 32 | 39 | 17 | 36 | DSQ | 172 |
| 40 | Juvelen | Håkan Carlsson; Jan Good | Sweden | 43 | 60 | 48 | 30 | 18 | 171 |
| 41 | Damoiselle II | Andre Chaudoye; Didier de Rolland | France | 34 | 37 | 70 | 34 | 29 | 166 |
| 42 | Fram III | Ernst Gautschi; Emil Widmer | Switzerland | 42 | 56 | 42 | 29 | 38 | 163 |
| 43 | Aloha | Roger Bourdon; Simone Gallesio | Monaco | 24 | 63 | 22 | 53 | 47 | 161 |
| 44 | Clambambes | Jurgen Adolff; Franz Inselkammer | West Germany | 20 | 35 | 58 | 48 | 49 | 160 |
| 45 | Audaz | Antonio de Menezes; Fernando Lima Bello | Portugal | 25 | 13 | 52 | 49 | DNF | 157 |
| 46 | Posillipo IV | Antonio Cosentino; M. Florenzano | Italy | 36 | 26 | 40 | 37 | DNF | 157 |
| 47 | Larico | Joao M. Tito; J. C. Crombrugghe | Belgium | 51 | 50 | 24 | 38 | 51 | 156 |
| 48 | T. de Tarascon | Urs Bucher; Rolfe Amrein | Switzerland | 44 | 22 | 43 | 33 | DNF | 154 |
| 49 | Titila | Roberto Mieres; Eduardo Bruno | Argentina | 63 | 28 | 56 | 41 | 39 | 143 |
| 50 | Gemini | Richard G. Hahn; J. E. Munroe | United States | 65 | 17 | 51 | 21 | DNF | 142 |
| 51 | May Be | Harald Musil; Peter Schaup | Austria | 26 | 53 | 9 | DNF | DNF | 134 |
| 52 | Pasodoble | Enrique Urrutia; Emil Gurruchaga | Spain | DSQ | 36 | 63 | 39 | 25 | 133 |
| 53 | Grola III | Luigi Viacava; Giorgio Falck | Italy | 49 | 45 | 60 | 45 | 53 | 118 |
| 54 | Lenou V | Louis Mouret; M. Gaubert | France | 58 | 54 | 29 | DSA | 37 | 118 |
| 55 | Astrid | Chr. Buguel; Arnold Mabille | France | 38 | 57 | 62 | 28 | DNF | 111 |
| 56 | Monique | K. A. Rydqvist; Sune Carlsson | Sweden | DNF | DSQ | 13 | 24 | DNF | 111 |
| 57 | Rocinante | G. de Souza Ramos; Pierre de Mattos | Brazil | 52 | 51 | 33 | DNF | 50 | 110 |
| 58 | Ali Baba | Hans Bryner; Fredy Portier | Switzerland | 57 | 61 | 65 | 50 | 33 | 104 |
| 59 | Espuma del Mar | Daniel Camejo; Robert Bruce | Venezuela | 54 | 62 | 61 | 55 | 42 | 96 |
| 60 | Tifourki | Francois Ecot; Gisele Ecot | France | 53 | 65 | 69 | 43 | 46 | 94 |
| 61 | Egir | Jan Andersson; Bo Wickström | Sweden | 47 | 41 | 46 | DNF | DNF | 88 |
| 62 | Clambambes | Peter Adolff; Bernhard Frey | West Germany | 48 | 48 | 38 | DSA | DNF | 88 |
| 63 | Rena | Hannes Schwarz; Fritz Kocourek | West Germany | 64 | 58 | 59 | 54 | 54 | 81 |
| 64 | Zouz | Andre Lillo; Lars Lanke | Morocco | 66 | 49 | 68 | 56 | 55 | 76 |
| 65 | Orsa II | Mario Rivelli; Neri Stella | Italy | 60 | DSQ | 44 | 46 | DNF | 72 |
| 66 | Ninotchka | Peter D. Siemsen; Henrique Hall | Brazil | 59 | 64 | 66 | DSQ | 36 | 71 |
| 67 | Whisky | Jakob Itten; Peter Erzberger | Switzerland | DSQ | 59 | 53 | 51 | DNF | 59 |
| 68 | Disparate | Conde de Zubiria; Luis Aguirre | Spain | 68 | 66 | 54 | DNF | 52 | 56 |
| 69 | Raja III | Ulrich Pieschel; Horst Krohne | West Germany | 62 | 67 | 50 | DNF | DNS | 43 |
| 70 | Luti | Luiz Roboredo; Joaquim Ferreira | Portugal | 61 | DSQ | 67 | DNS | DNS | 20 |
| 71 | Coringa II | Cyril Milbourne; C. V. Reade | Brazil | 55 | DSA | DNS | DNS | DNS | 19 |
| 72 | Mexilhao | Manuel Ricciardi; Miguel Castanha | Portugal | DSQ | DSQ | 55 | DSA | DNS | 19 |
| 73 | Flamingo II | Ramon Canosa; Adolfo Navarette | Spain | 67 | 68 | DNS | DNS | DNS | 13 |

Legend: DNF – Did not finish; DNS – Did not start; DSA – Disabled; DSQ – Disqualified; WDR – Withdrew;
