= 1994 Star World Championships =

The 1994 Star World Championships were held in San Diego, United States between September 7 and 18, 1994. The hosting yacht club was San Diego Yacht Club.

== Results ==
Results of individual races
Pos	Crew	Country	I	II	III	IV	V	VI	Tot	Pts
Gold medal	Ross MacDonald (H); Eric Jespersen	Canada	4	1	7	14^{†}	1	8	35	21
Silver medal	Alan Adler (H); Rodrigo Meirleles	Brazil	6	2	26^{†}	1	6	7	48	22
Bronze medal	Torben Schmidt Grael (H); Marcelo Ferreira	Brazil	12	23^{†}	3	7	13	2	60	37
4	John Kostecki (H); Tom Olsen	United States	1	9	4	8	22^{†}	21	65	43
5	Eric Doyle (H); Bill Bennett	United States	5	14	29^{†}	12	8	5	73	44
6	Carl Buchan (H); Fritz Lanzinger	United States	20	12	23^{†}	10	4	1	70	47
7	George Szabo III (H); Rick Peters	United States	9	98^{†} DSQ	20	17	7	3	154	56
8	Hans Wallén (H); Bobby Lohse	Sweden	2	13	2	22	41^{†}	22	102	61
9	Michael Hestbæk (H); Martin Hejlsberg	Denmark	3	26	12	9	34^{†}	15	99	65
10	Mark Reynolds (H); Hal Haenel	United States	18	21^{†}	5	18	18	6	86	65
11	Albino Fravezzi (H); Paolo Busolo	Italy	24	8	43	28	61^{†}	9	173	112
11	Joe Londrigan (H); Phil Trinter	United States	7	98^{†} DNF	10	20	17	18	170	72
12	Peter Bromby (H); Lee White	Bermuda	28	4	8	26	15	48^{†}	129	81
13	Jose Doreste (H); Javier Hermida	Spain	29	30	1	16	10	36^{†}	122	86
14	Bill Buchan Jr. (H); Brian Ledbetter	United States	19	25	42^{†}	11	20	14	131	89
15	Enrico Chieffi (H); Hermes Costa	Italy	11	98^{†} DSQ	27	6	2	46	190	92
16	Urs Hunkeler (H); Markus Lauber	Switzerland	16	24	13	38^{†}	29	13	133	95
17	Pietro D'Ali (H); Corrado Cristaldini	Italy	33	27	6	30	3	58^{†}	157	99
19	Joachim Hellmich (H); Dirk Schwaertzel	Germany	27	7	31^{†}	27	26	26	144	113
20	Ross Adams (H); Chuck Nevel	United States	14	18	24	24	33^{†}	33	146	113
21	John King (H); Wellington de Barros	Brazil	39^{†}	23; YMP	36	29	19	11	157	118
22	Frank Butzmann (H); Michael Umlauft	Germany	13	6	98^{†} DSQ	2	24	78	221	123
23	Fernando Bello (H); Mario Sampaio	Portugal	10	28	60^{†}	36	32	17	183	123
24	Alexander Hagen (H); Kai Falkenthal	Germany	46^{†}	5	14	42	36	28	171	125
25	Kevin Miller (H); John Curnutte	United States	22	98^{†} DSQ	9	65	12	19	225	127
26	John A. MacCausland (H); Robert MacCausland	United States	34	16	35	35	9	54^{†}	183	129
27	Vincent Brun (H); Mike Dorgan	United States	15	3	98^{†} DNF	3	98; DSQ	12	229	131
28	Eckart Wagner (H); Hugo Schreiner	Germany	30	61^{†}	15	23	37	27	193	132
29	Rob Maine III (H); Greg Alm	United States	32	20	16	49^{†}	45	25	187	138
30	Benny Andersen (H); Mogens Just	Denmark	35	10	21	5	67	82^{†}	220	138
31	James Brett (H); Scott Warnes	Australia	17	45	25	46	11	66^{†}	210	144
32	Brian Carmet (H); Alex Camet	United States	25	15	65	72^{†}	39	4	220	148
33	Paolo Semeraro (H); Ferdinando Colaninno	Italy	57^{†}	46	38	37	5	29	212	155
34	Ben Mitchell (H); Bill Stump	United States	78^{†}	53	27	19	25	42	244	156
35	Rex Bienz (H); Beat Stegmeier	Switzerland	8	34	62	33	28	84^{†}	249	165
35	Peter E. Siemsen (H); Andre Lekszycki	Brazil	23	49	44	34	14	98^{†} DNF	262	164
37	Ron Sandstrom (H); Chris Rogers	United States	53^{†}	43	33	4	43	45	221	168
38	Lee Kellerhouse (H); Marco Columbo	United States	59^{†}	36	47	21	35	37	235	176
39	Mark Mansfield (H); Owen Dennis	Ireland	31	39	22	41	53^{†}	43	229	176
40	Jack Kisseoglou (H); Dimitrios Boukis	Greece	83	98^{†} DSQ	30	31	31	10	283	185
41	Dewitt Morris (H); Forrest Williams	United States	61^{†}	47	53	15	42	32	250	189
42	Arthur Anosov (H); Myrchuk Alexander	Ukraine	44	50^{†}	39	53	27	34	247	194
43	Mats Johansson (H); Mattias Frode	Sweden	45	22	28	48	52	79^{†}	274	195
44	Luis F.L. Simao (H); Felipe Lobao Rudge	Brazil	42	29	50	45	30	60^{†}	256	196
45	Larry Whipple (H); Garth Olsen	United States	43	55^{†}	19	51	48	41	257	202
46	Stephan Schurich (H); F. Xaver Gruber	Austria	58	42	11	50	51	76^{†}	288	212
47	Pelle Petterson (H); Joel Kew	Sweden	72^{†}	37	48	25	66	47	295	223
48	Jurg Ryffel (H); Daniel Roth	Switzerland	21	44	56	67	38	70^{†}	296	226
49	Ross Miller (H); Jed Miller	United States	50	58	49	13	56	63^{†}	289	226
50	Glyn Charles (H); Simon Fry	Great Britain	48	19	41	98^{†} PMS	40	80	326	228
51	Nicolo Saidelli (H); Nicola Menoni	Italy	82	33	18	40	98^{†} DSQ	56	327	229
52	Steven Bakker (H); Peter Peet	Netherlands	76	17	89^{†}	64	23	53	322	233
53	Sergey Khoretsky (H); Hermann Weiler	Belarus	26	64	64	66^{†}	21	61	302	236
54	Kevin McNeil (H); Chris Higgs	United States	36	81^{†}	52	62	16	75	322	241
55	Augusto Barrozo (H); Paulo Fabriani	Brazil	41	60	37	78^{†}	49	55	320	242
56	Douglas Smith (H); Garth Miller	United States	37	32	68	39	70^{†}	68	314	244
57	Jochen Diercks (H); Herbert Braasch	Germany	69^{†}	48	55	68	46	30	316	247
58	Philip Graves (H); Barry van Leeuwen	Canada	67	98^{†} DSQ	34	44	72	31	346	248
59	Albert Schweizer (H); Perret Mathias	Germany	40	63	81	32	98^{†} DSQ	35	349	251
60	Roberto Benamati (H); Giuseppe Devoti	Italy	98^{†} DSQ	11	45	98; PMS	47	57	356	258
61	Rainer Wilhelm (H); Wolfgang Krepcik	Austria	64	83^{†}	72	58	50	23	350	267
62	Andreas Sellwig (H); Lutz Boguhn	Germany	66	40	67	98^{†} PMS	57	44	372	274
63	Charles Beek (H); Edward V. Lyon	United States	49	67^{†}	59	63	54	52	344	277
64	Pat Londrigan (H); Brian Terhaar	United States	70	41	79^{†}	56	65	49	360	281
65	Ben Staartjes (H); Peter Brinkgrave	Netherlands	79^{†}	62	71	71; YMP	44	38	365	286
66	Guram Biganishvili (H); Vladimir Gruzdev	Georgia	38	31	51	98^{†} PMS	69	98; DNC	385	287
67	Richard Grönblom (H); Ville Kurki	Finland	73	66	73	98^{†} DNS	59	16	385	287
68	Ingvar Krook (H); Magnus Henriksson	Sweden	62	79	83^{†}	74	55	20	373	290
69	Logan Farrar (H); Gill Cole	United States	71	56	32	54	98^{†} DSQ	77	388	290
70	Henning Voigt (H); Dirk Struve	Germany	54	38	76	55	76	83^{†}	382	299
71	James L. Butler (H); Mark D. Butler	United States	90^{†}	75	80	43	79	24	391	301
72	Glenn Read (H); Mark Fisher	Australia	92^{†}	57	54	59	81	51	394	302
73	Jon Little (H); Mike Claxton	Canada	63	98^{†} DSQ	46	73	63	59	402	304
74	Ian E. Johnson (H); Tim Ede	Australia	74	76^{†}	70	47	48	40	355	307
75	Trig Liljestrand (H); Herb Magney	United States	55	35	63; YMP	77	83	90^{†}	403	313
76	Josef Pieper (H); Werner Staufer	Germany	52	72	58	98^{†} DSQ	64	74	418	320
77	Kim Fletcher (H); Bill Kreysler	United States	87^{†}	71	40	52	80	81	411	324
78	Christoph Gautschi (H); Ronald Braun	Switzerland	68	52	86^{†}	57	77	71	411	325
79	Mike Ilgenstein (H); Haymo Jepsen	Germany	47	68	57	98^{†} PMS	98; DSQ	67	435	337
80	Sune Carlsson (H); Eric Beckwith	Sweden	81	69	66	98^{†} PMS	84	39	437	339
81	Chris Nielson (H); Ed Hughes	United States	98^{†} DNS	51	69	71	62	87	438	340
82	Don Krippendorf (H); Chris Lanza	United States	65	54	98^{†} DNF	81	68	73	439	341
83	Otto Zieglmeier (H); Peter Girr	Germany	51	65	82	98^{†} DNF	86	62	444	346
84	Riccardo Simoneschi (H); Ardrea Vegetti	Italy	84	74	61	98^{†} PMS	58	72	447	349
85	John Foster (H); Mark Strube	U.S. Virgin Islands	89^{†}	82	77	69	75	50	442	353
86	Hans Fendt (H); Florian Fendt	Germany	75	59	88	61	73	93^{†}	449	356
87	Dierk Thomsen (H); Lars Thomsen	Germany	93^{†}	70	63	80	90	65	461	368
88	Ed Sprague Jr. (H); Bruce Cameron	United States	88	98^{†} DSQ	84	79	60	64	473	375
89	Gerhard Hobiger (H); Robert Ullrich	Austria	60	98^{†} DSQ	91	76	71	88	484	386
90	Mario Caprile (H); Ramon Bernar	Spain	85	80	78	70	82	94^{†}	489	390
91	George Szabo Jr. (H); Fritz Kunzel	United States	80	80	78	70	82	94^{†}	484	390
92	Flavio Scala (H); Alberto Rossari	Italy	77	98^{†} DSQ	74	60	98; DNC	98; DNC	505	407
93	John Allen (H); John Ahlquist	United States	94^{†}	78	75	83	87	89	506	412
94	Rainer R. Roellenbleg (H); Mario Salani	Germany	56	98^{†} PMS	98; DNF	75	98; DSQ	86	511	413
95	Joseph Pro (H); David Bird	United States	86	73	87	98^{†} PMS	89	92	525	427
96	E. F. Atkinson (H); Tom Seeling	United States	95	98^{†} DSQ	92	82	85	85	537	439
97	J. Joseph Bainton (H); Michael Marcel	United States	91	98^{†} DSQ	90	98; DSQ	88	91	556	458

Legend: DNC – Did not come to the starting area; DNF – Did not finish; DSQ – Disqualified; PMS – Premature start; YMP – Yacht materially prejudiced;
