= 1966 Star World Championship =

Event title
- Edition: 44th
- Host: Kieler Yacht-Club

Event details
- Venue: Kiel
- Yachts: Star
- Titles: 1

Competitors
- Competitors: 156
- Competing nations: 17

Results
- (gold) Gold: (Denmark) Elvstrøm & Albrechtson
- (silver) Silver: (United States) North & Barrett
- (bronze) Bronze: (United States) Stearns & Williams

The 1966 Star World Championship was held in Kiel, West Germany, in 1966, organised by Kieler Yacht-Club.

== Results ==
Results of individual races
Pos	Boat name	Crew	Country	I	II	III	IV	V	Tot
Gold medal	Scandale	Paul Elvstrøm; John Albrechtson	Denmark	1	3	2	1	11	377
Silver medal	North Star	Lowell North; Peter Barrett	United States	8	1	1	8	3	374
Bronze medal	Glider	Richard Stearns; Lynn Williams	United States	4	2	6	4	7	372
4	Goldstar	Joseph R. Duplin; Francis Dolan	United States	2	16	3	2	1	371
5	Taifun	Timir Pinegin; Fyodor Shutkov	Soviet Union	6	7	8	10	4	360
6	Squid III	Peter Tallberg; Henrik Tallberg	Finland	3	9	9	9	15	350
7	Humbug VI	Pelle Petterson; Holger Sundström	Sweden	7	5	10	16	10	347
8	Subbnboana	Eckart Wagner; Fritz Kopperschmidt	West Germany	36	4	4	5	2	344
9	Romance	Franco Cavallo; Camillo Gargano	Italy	24	14	19	6	12	320
10	Gem IX	Durward Knowles; Robert Levin	Bahamas	10	8	12	3	49	313
11	Flambeau	Miles P. Wynn; C. Schneider	United States	30	11	11	25	6	312
12	Mystere	Edwin Bernet; Rolf Amrein	Switzerland	34	10	22	12	9	308
13	Desiree	Angelo Marino; Enzo Fania	Italy	20	30	13	34	5	293
14	Kathleen	Herbert Williams; Bengt Hellsten	United States	18	6	24	19	42	286
15	Shandry	E. W. Etchells; Kim Fletcher	United States	25	13	21	36	14	286
16	Illusion	Paul E. Fischer; Ottomar Lampe	West Germany	21	19	29	18	23	285
17	Tempest	Bruce Kirby; David Kirby	Canada	22	15	23	42	21	272
18	Mari	Sune Carlsson; Arne Carlsson	Sweden	12	DNF	15	17	13	259
19	Peau de Chagrin	Andre Chaudoye; Armel Ducreux	France	38	25	28	23	26	255
20	Blott IX	Stig Wennerström; Jan Lybeck	Sweden	17	DNS	5	11	30	253
21	Dingo	Ding Schoonmaker; John Boyer Jr.	United States	23	DNF	7	7	28	251
22	Ta Fatt VI	Jacob Engwall; Anders Holmgren	Sweden	15	DNF	18	15	17	251
23	Caprice III	Carlo Rolandi; Alfonso Marino	Italy	39	41	16	31	19	249
24	Pummel VI	Detlef Kuke; Christian Koch	West Germany	5	21	DSQ	20	24	246
25	Epoca	Hans Wiklund; Bengt Brusberg	Sweden	35	23	35	14	44	244
26	Avoltore	Antonio Cosentino; Alfonso Mele	Italy	37	40	32	22	20	244
27	Aloha	Roger Bourdon; N. Bondaletoff	France	16	28	41	41	25	244
28	Alnilam	Klaus Zistl; Peter Stockmayr	West Germany	40	17	40	26	32	240
29	Olimpia III	Kálmán Tolnai; Erno Rumi	Hungary	26	34	27	29	39	240
30	Bellatrix XIV	Bruno Splieth; Karsten Meyer	West Germany	13	24	14	32	DNF	233
31	Pimm	Walter von Hütschler; Arnaldo Lopes	Brazil	14	18	62	35	40	226
32	Schwerker	Börje Larsson; Bo Johansson	Sweden	32	DNF	25	21	22	216
33	Nortada	P. Migliaccio; Alberto Penta	Italy	28	35	37	30	52	213
34	Dorrit VI	Esbjörn Bruske; Leif Rosenquist	Sweden	9	DSQ	20	46	35	206
35	Tove	Sture Christensson; Jan Andersson	Sweden	41	12	DNF	28	31	204
36	Kamaaina	Emil Widmer; Albert Lechner	Switzerland	33	DNF	34	40	27	182
37	Tantrum	Ricardo Salgado; Jose E. Santo	Portugal	50	29	45	33	56	182
38	Star de la Cote	J. C. de Bokay; Patrick Warluzel	France	DNF	22	38	43	33	180
39	Susan III	Dieter Laubmann; Karl H. Laubmann	West Germany	43	33	42	50	53	169
40	Black Star	Max Kastinger; H. Kastinger	Austria	29	46	DNS	56	18	167
41	Faneca	Duarte de Almeida Bello; Antonio Rocha	Portugal	42	27	43	60	54	166
42	Flamingo IV	Jose Q. Saldanha; Donald Coleman	Portugal	11	DNF	DNF	24	38	164
43	Pasodoble	Enrique Urrutia; Angel Mateo	Spain	DNF	20	30	61	48	157
44	Mizar III	Heinz Lambeck; Jochen Barry	West Germany	DNF	31	33	38	58	156
45	Windy	Jay C. Winberg; Lars Gunner Dahl	United States	19	DNF	26	DNF	37	155
46	Clambambes	Jurgen Adolff; Manfred Meier	West Germany	61	44	46	54	43	147
47	Skorpion II	Werner Nowak; Dieter Meier	West Germany	46	DNS	DNS	39	8	144
48	Napadelix	Michele Briand; M. Cremauld	France	DNF	DNF	31	27	36	143
49	Goggolori	Rainer Schmid; Peter Schmid	West Germany	60	37	DNF	44	34	141
50	Fair Lady	Hannes Schwarz; Heinz Loichinger	West Germany	27	DNF	39	64	45	141
51	Fram VI	Ernst Gautschi; Walter Benz	Switzerland	58	47	52	37	61	140
52	Ma' Lindo	Mário Quina; Manuel Ricciardi	Portugal	31	DNF	48	47	51	139
53	Nadia	Jurg Christen; C. Christen	Switzerland	54	45	DSQ	52	29	136
54	Huli	Charles H. Dole; Thomas Carpenter	United States	45	DNF	42	51	46	132
55	Ingenue	George F. Thomas; Ross Campbell	United States	57	42	50	59	55	132
56	Sugar Rabbit	Chuck Lewsadder; Don Davis	United States	DNF	DNF	DNF	13	16	129
57	Flying Star V	Lars Berg; Dag Blidbäck	Sweden	59	43	49	49	68	127
58	Argo	V. Vasilyev; Eduard Shugai	Soviet Union	51	DNF	17	45	DNF	124
59	Amethyst	John Sherwood; John J. Jenkins	United States	DNF	26	36	53	DNF	122
60	Jaguar	Klaus Kappes; Robert Bohler	West Germany	47	DNF	57	57	41	114
61	Mistral	Zygfryd Perlicki; Adam Petecki	Poland	63	38	56	65	59	114
62	Ariel	Max Schatzmann; Tibor Demeny	Switzerland	DNF	48	44	55	62	107
63	Annalisa II	Pino Tosi; Toni Vascotto	Spain	52	DNF	54	58	50	102
64	Claudia	Hans Bernström; Ken Nordenberg	Sweden	55	39	DNF	63	60	99
65	Balaton	István Telegdy; Jozsef Ribianzky	Hungary	DNS	36	53	69	64	94
66	Nappis-Ueli	Paul J. Bischof; Primus Wirsch	West Germany	65	49	61	70	63	87
67	Aramis	Victor Wittmann; J. J. Wittmann	France	53	DSQ	DNS	48	54	82
68	Fiamma	Oskar A. Meier; Dany Weiss	Switzerland	48	32	DNS	DNS	DNS	78
69	Sharen	A. Meray-Horvath; Martin Walker	Canada	64	DNF	60	66	66	60
70	Tanaquil III	Jan Both; Albert Hollinger	Switzerland	49	DNF	51	DNF	DNS	58
71	Lucky Liz	Roberto Mieres; G. Calegari	Argentina	DNF	DNF	DNS	62	47	49
72	Gwenaelle	Georges Dantoine; Christian Buguel	France	62	DNF	58	71	DNF	46
73	Bahiall	Georges Mueller; Heinz Eger	Switzerland	67	DNF	59	DNF	67	44
74	Geisha III	Wolfgang Creutz; Mathias Wahl	West Germany	66	DNF	DNS	68	65	38
75	Raju VI	Ulrich Pieschel; Heiner Diekmann	West Germany	WDR	DNF	55	67	DNF	36
76	Cherie VI	Rudi Berchtold; Klaus Wehner	West Germany	44	DNF	DNS	DNS	DNS	35
77	Filistar	V. Marttinen; H. Svartström	Finland	56	DNF	DNF	DNF	DNS	23
78	Floh III	Erich Stoll; G. Steinlechner	West Germany	DNF	DNS	DNS	DNS	DNS	0

Legend: DNF – Did not finish; DNS – Did not start; DSQ – Disqualified; WDR – Withdrew;
