= Sailing at the 2000 Summer Olympics – Star =

Sailing at the Olympics

Open Two Person Keelboat at the Games of the XXVII Olympiad
- Star
- Venue: Sydney
- Dates: First race: 23 September 2000; Last race: 30 September 2000
- Competitors: 32 from 16 nations
- Teams: 16

Medalists
1st place, gold medalist(s)		Mark Reynolds; Magnus Liljedahl	United States
2nd place, silver medalist(s)		Ian Walker; Mark Covell	Great Britain
3rd place, bronze medalist(s)		Torben Grael; Marcelo Ferreira	Brazil

The Open Two Person Keelboat at the 2000 Summer Olympics was held from 23 to 30 September 2000 in Sydney in Australia. Points were awarded for placement in each race. Eleven races were scheduled and sailed. Each sailor had two discards.

== Results ==
Results of individual races
Position	Nation	Name	Role	1	2	3	4	5	6	7	8	9	10	11	Total	Net
Gold medal	United States	Mark Reynolds; Magnus Liljedahl	Helm; Crew	-14	3	-10	5	6	10	1	2	4	1	2	58	34
Silver medal	Great Britain	Ian Walker; Mark Covell	Helm; Crew	1	-9	-11	7	2	3	2	1	7	9	3	55	35
Bronze medal	Brazil	Torben Grael; Marcelo Ferreira	Helm; Crew	3	-13	1	2	1	6	7	4	12	3	OCS (-17)	69	39
4	Bermuda	Peter Bromby; Lee White	Helm; Crew	4	-10	3	8	4	1	-12	7	6.3	8	4	67.3	45.3
5	Canada	Ross MacDonald; Kai Bjorn	Helm; Crew	7	5	13	4	-14	5	3	OCS (-17)	5	5	1	79	48
6	Netherlands	Mark Neeleman; Jos Schrier	Helm; Crew	5	7	7	-11	8	4	-15	6	1	4	8	76	50
7	Australia	Colin Beashel; David Giles	Helm; Crew	8	8	6	1	3	2	8	9	DSQ (-17)	-12	6	80	51
8	Spain	José van der Ploeg; Rafael Trujillo	Helm; Crew	2	4	DSQ (-17)	3	11	7	4	10	3	11	OCS (-17)	89	55
9	New Zealand	Gavin Brady; Jamie Gale	Helm; Crew	-16	1	5	9	5	15	6	5	2	-16	9	89	57
10	Italy	Pietro D'Alì; Ferdinando Colaninno	Helm; Crew	9	2	8	6	13	12	10	OCS (-17)	DNC (-17)	2	OCS (17)	113	79
11	Greece	Leonidas Pelekanakis; Dimitrios Boukis	Helm; Crew	6	11	-15	-14	12	13	5	11	9	6	7	109	80
12	Germany	Marc Aurel Pickel; Thomas Auracher	Helm; Crew	11	6	2	13	10	8	11	13	8	-15	DSQ (-17)	114	82
13	Sweden	Mats Johansson; Leif Moeller	Helm; Crew	-12	-16	9	12	9	11	9	8	10	7	10	113	85
14	Ireland	Mark Mansfield; David O'Brien	Helm; Crew	-15	12	12	10	7	9	13	3	11	13	OCS (-17)	122	90
15	Switzerland	Flavio Marazzi; Renato Marazzi	Helm; Crew	13	14	4	DSQ (-17)	DSQ (-17)	DNF (-17)	16	12	6	10	5	131	97
16	Argentina	Eduardo Farré; Mariano Lucca	Helm; Crew	10	-15	14	15	DNC (-17)	14	14	14	13	14	11	151	119

== Notes ==
Points are assigned based on the finishing position in each race (1 for first, 2 for second, etc.). The points are totalled from the top 10 results of the 11 races, with lower totals being better. If a sailor was disqualified or did not complete the race, 26 points are assigned for that race (as there were 25 sailors in this competition).

Scoring abbreviations are defined as follows:

- OCS – On course side of the starting line
- DSQ – Disqualified
- DNF – Did not finish
- DNS – Did not start
- RDG – Redress given

== Sources ==
Results and weather take from https://web.archive.org/web/20050825083600/http://www.sailing.org/olympics2000/info2000/
