= John Bodden =

John Bodden may refer to:

- John Bodden (footballer) (born 1981), Honduran footballer
- John Bodden (sailor) (born 1956), Caymanian sailor
