= Christian Ilmoni =

Finnish sailor

Bror-Christian Ilmoni (8 March 1918 in Pargas, Finland – 27 January 2008 in Helsinki, Finland) was a Finnish Olympic sailor in the Star class. He competed in the 1948 Summer Olympics, where he finished 12th together with René Nyman, and in the 1952 Summer Olympics where he finished 19th together with Nyman.
