= Neuhammer =

Neuhammer may refer to:

- Neuhammer (Rietschen), village in the municipality of Rietschen in the Görlitz district, Saxony, Germany
- German name of Jagodzin, a village in Gmina Węgliniec, Poland
- German name of Świętoszów, a village in Gmina Osiecznica, Poland
- German name of Nowa Kuźnia, Opole Voivodeship, a village in Gmina Prószków, Poland

== See also ==
- Nehammer
