= Henrique Anjos =

Portuguese sailor

Personal information
- Nationality: Portuguese
- Born: 6 April 1952; Lisbon, Portugal
- Died: 17 May 1993 (aged 41); Cascais, Portugal

Sport
- Sport: Sailing

Henrique Anjos (6 April 1952 – 17 May 1993) was a Portuguese sailor. He competed at the 1972 Summer Olympics, the 1984 Summer Olympics, and the 1988 Summer Olympics.
