= Robert French (sailor) =

Australian sailor

Robert Edward French (30 April 1918 – 1 July 2006) was an Australian sailor. He competed for Australia at three Olympic Games, in 1948 in the Firefly class and in 1956 and 1960 in the Star class.
