= Kurt Bryner =

Swiss sailor

Personal information
- Nationality: Swiss
- Born: 9 October 1916

Sport
- Sport: Sailing

Kurt Bryner (9 October 1916 – February 1984) was a Swiss sailor. He competed at the 1948 Summer Olympics and the 1952 Summer Olympics.
