= Nehammer =

Nehammer is a surname.

== List of people with the surname ==
- Christian Nehammer (born 1976), Austrian sailor
- Karl Nehammer (born 1972), Austrian politician who served as 28th Chancellor of Austria

== See also ==
- Neuhammer (disambiguation)
- Nehammer government
