= Urs-Ulrich Bucher =

Swiss sailor

Urs-Ulrich Bucher (6 September 1926 – 17 April 2002) was a Swiss sailor who competed in the 1960 Summer Olympics and in the 1964 Summer Olympics.
