= György Holovits =

Hungarian sailor

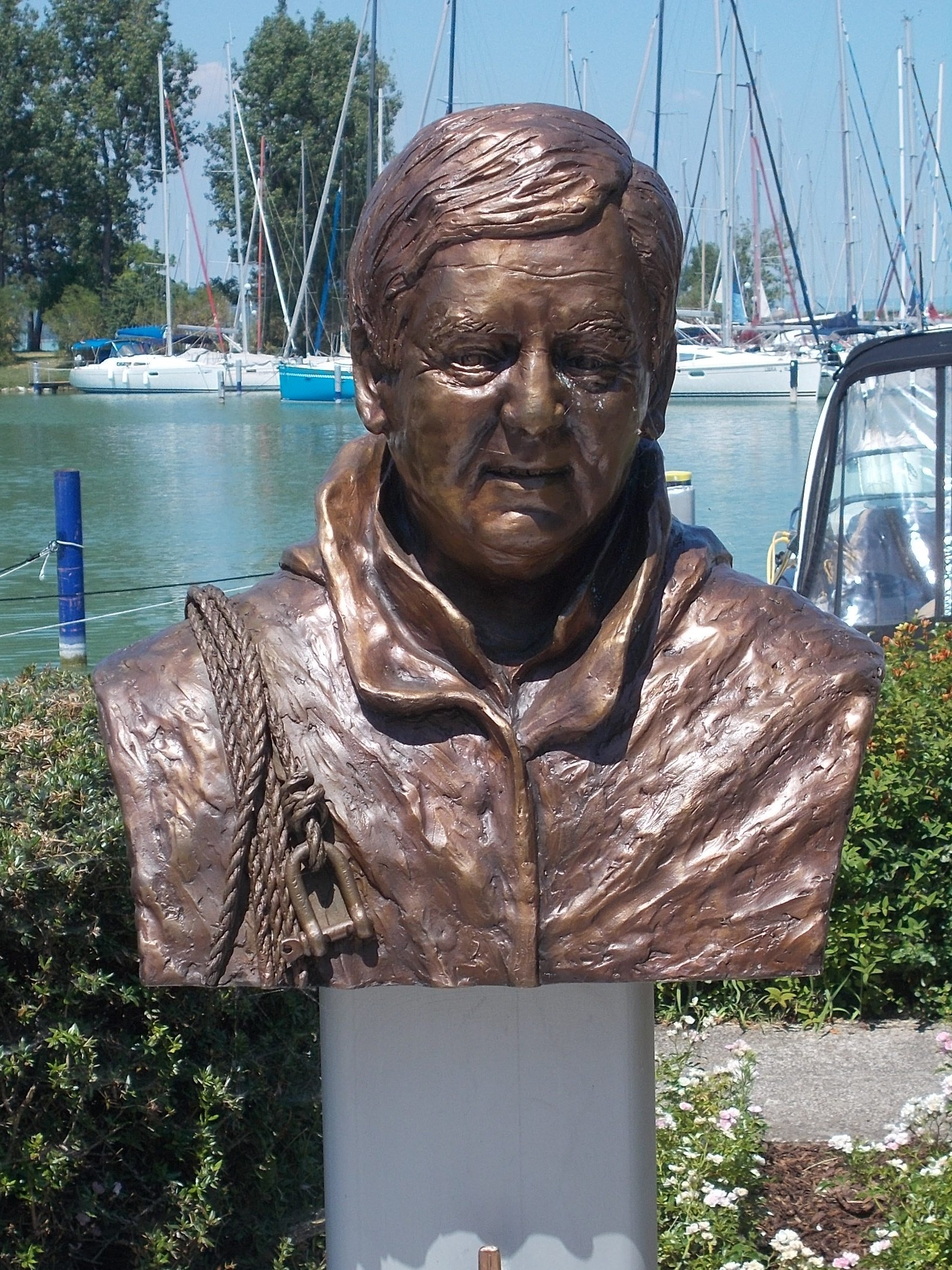
- Bust of Holovits in Balatonföldvár

Personal information
- Nationality: Hungarian
- Born: 15 June 1946; Balatonföldvár, Hungary
- Died: 3 May 2018 (aged 71)

Sport
- Sport: Sailing

György Holovits (15 June 1946 – 3 May 2018) was a Hungarian sailor. He competed at the 1972 Summer Olympics and the 1980 Summer Olympics.
