= Oswald Blouin =

Canadian sailor (born 1948)

Oswald Blouin (born 28 January 1948) is a Canadian former sailor who competed in the 1968 Summer Olympics.
