= Donald Dowd =

Kenndey campaign aide (1923–2010)

Donald Dowd (1923 – January 24, 2010) was an American political aide from western Massachusetts who worked for Ted Kennedy and the Kennedy family for more than four decades. He first worked on Ted Kennedy's 1962 Senate campaign, took part in Robert F. Kennedy's 1968 presidential campaign in Indiana and California helped organize the 1979 dedication of the John F. Kennedy Library and later worked in government affairs for Coca-Cola in Boston. Richard Neal described Donald as a legendary figure, and recalled him as a great friend and mentor. Dowd was the retired vice president of public affairs for Coca-Cola in Boston.

In 1968, Donald Dowd worked on the Presidential campaign of Robert F. Kennedy, and was on the campaign trail with Kennedy when Kennedy was shot dead at the Ambassador Hotel in Los Angeles on June 6, 1968. Dowd previously worked in President Kennedy's administration, in the Post Office Department.

== Career ==
=== Early work for Ted Kennedy ===
Dowd grew up in the Irish-American "Hungry Hill" neighbourhood of Springfield, Massachusetts, and ran his parents' bar for twelve years. He said that after attending John F. Kennedy's 1961 inauguration he was asked to help the president's brother if he ran for the Senate and in 1962 he worked in western Massachusetts to win delegates for Ted Kennedy at the state Democratic convention in Springfield including by showing a film about Kennedy to Italian-American clubs. When Kennedy was seriously injured in a plane crash near Southampton, Massachusetts in June 1964, Dowd drove Joan Kennedy to Cooley Dickinson Hospital in Northampton, Massachusetts.

After Kennedy's 1964 re-election, he took a job at the United States Post Office Department's regional office in Boston as assistant to the regional director, staying about five years.

=== 1968 presidential campaign ===
In 1968 Dowd left the Post Office to work on Robert F. Kennedy's presidential campaign. He organized volunteers in Evansville, Indiana, where Kennedy won the primary, and then went to Los Angeles to help with the California primary, where he said he served as field director in the final days. He was at the Ambassador Hotel on the night of June 4, 1968, when Kennedy was shot and went to the hospital afterward.

=== Later career ===
Dowd organized a series of "town meeting" events for Ted Kennedy's 1970 Senate campaign and served as president of Special Olympics Massachusetts for seven years after its founding in 1972. In the late 1970s he organized annual summer camping trips in western Massachusetts for Kennedy's children and their cousins. He helped plan the October 1979 dedication of the John F. Kennedy Library in Boston which drew about 7,400 people. During Ted Kennedy's 1980 presidential campaign, he coordinated efforts in Indiana and worked in other primary states and he ran field operations for Kennedy's 1982 Senate re-election campaign. He then joined Coca-Cola, where he worked in government affairs and retired as vice president of public affairs in Boston.

== Death ==
Dowd died on January 24, 2010, at the age of 87. After the 1962 election he worked for the Massachusetts Department of Public Works.
