= Jack Downey =

Australian sailor

John McKenzie Downey (9 August 1921 – 12 May 2006) was an Australian sailor. He competed for Australia at two Olympic Games in the Star class in 1956 and 1960. Downey was born in Hawthorn, Victoria, Australia.
