= Montague Higgs =

Bahamian sailor

Personal information
- Nationality: Bahamian
- Born: 27 January 1939
- Died: 14 November 2006 (aged 67)

Sport
- Sport: Sailing

Montague Higgs (27 January 1939 – 14 November 2006) was a Bahamian sailor. He competed at the 1972 Summer Olympics and the 1984 Summer Olympics.
