= Bruce Banks =

British sailor

Personal information
- Full name: Bruce Bernard Banks
- Nationality: British
- Born: 5 April 1918; Birkenhead, England
- Died: 7 April 1984 (aged 66); Portsmouth, England

Sailing career
- Class: Star

Bruce Bernard Banks (5 April 1918 – 7 April 1984) was a British sailor. He competed at the 1952 Summer Olympics and the 1956 Summer Olympics.
