= Vladimer Gruzdevi =

Georgian sailor

Personal information
- Nationality: Georgian
- Born: 2 July 1952 (age 73); Mariupol, Ukraine

Sport
- Sport: Sailing

Vladimer Gruzdevi (born 2 July 1952) is a Georgian sailor. He competed at the 1992 Summer Olympics and the 1996 Summer Olympics.
