= Li Hongquan =

Chinese sailor (born 1969)

Li Hongquan (born September 9, 1969, in Dongshan, Zhangzhou) is a male Chinese sports sailor. He competed for Team China at the 2008 Summer Olympics.

== Major performances ==
- 1993 National Games – 1st flying Dutchman class;
- 1997/2001 National Games – 1st Finn class
