= Tony Collard =

Dutch ice hockey player

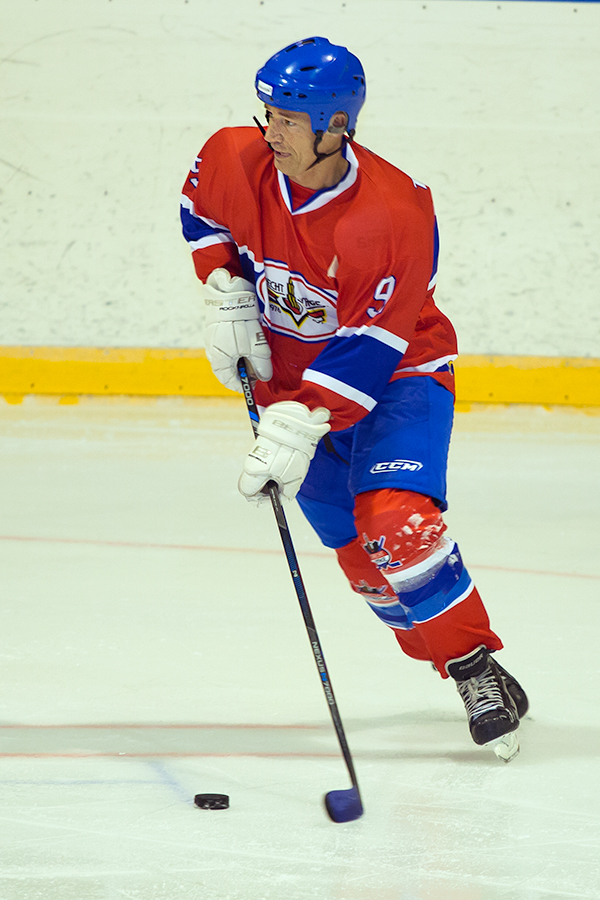
- Tonny Collard the most successful hockey player from the Netherlands in the 70s and 80s with a comprehensive international hockey career
- Born: 28 July 1961 (age 63); Utrecht, Netherlands
- Height: 5 ft 11 in (180 cm)
- Weight: 187 lb (85 kg; 13 st 5 lb)
- Position: Forward
- Played for: Netherlands; Heerenveen Flyers; Klagenfurter AC; EV Zug
- National team: Netherlands
- NHL draft: Undrafted
- Playing career: 1980–2005

Tony Collard (born 28 July 1961) is a Dutch former professional ice hockey player.

Collard played junior hockey in Canada with the London Knights of the Ontario Hockey Association (OHA). He began his professional career in 1980 with the Heerenveen Flyers, remaining with the team until 1985 when he relocated to Austria to play with Klagenfurter AC until 1989. During this period he also skated in five games with EV Zug in the Swiss National League A.

== International ==
Collard was a long time member of the Netherlands men's national ice hockey team, and he competed with Team Netherlands at the 1981 World Ice Hockey Championships.
