= António Correia (sailor) =

Portuguese sailor

Personal information
- Nationality: Portuguese
- Born: 16 July 1933; Lisbon, Portugal
- Died: 22 April 2012 (aged 78)

Sport
- Sport: Sailing

António Correia (16 July 1933 – 22 April 2012) was a Portuguese sailor. He competed at the 1972 Summer Olympics and the 1984 Summer Olympics.
