= Nikolaos Vlangalis =

Greek sailor

Personal information
- Nationality: Greek
- Born: 26 October 1907 Athens, Greece
- Died: 1978 (aged 70–71) Athens, Greece

Sport
- Sport: Sailing

Nikolaos Vlangalis (26 October 1907 – 1978) was a Greek sailor. He competed at the 1948 Summer Olympics and the 1960 Summer Olympics.
