= Stanley Potter (sailor) =

British sailor

Personal information
- Full name: Stanley Arthur Potter
- Nationality: British
- Born: 3 June 1914; London, England
- Died: 10 January 1978 (aged 63); Isle of Wight, England

Sport
- Sport: Sailing

Stanley Arthur Potter (3 June 1914 – 10 January 1978) was a British sailor. He competed at the 1952 Summer Olympics and the 1956 Summer Olympics.
