= John Foster Sr. (sailor) =

US Virgin Islands sailor

John Frederick Foster (born February 25, 1938) is a sailor from the US Virgin Islands. He competed at six Olympic Games, five in sailing at Summer Olympics from 1972 to 1992 (excluding 1980) and once in Bobsleigh at the 1988 Winter Olympics.

He competed with his son John Foster Jr. in the two-person keelboat at the 1984, 1988, and 1992 Olympics.

He was Commodore of the St Thomas Yacht Club in the Virgin Islands from 1967-1968.

== See also ==
- List of athletes with the most appearances at Olympic Games
