= William West (sailor) =

Canadian sailor (born 1931)

Robert William West (born 1 December 1931) is a Canadian former Star Class sailor who competed in the 1960 Summer Olympics and in the 1964 Summer Olympics. He was born in Vancouver, British Columbia.

== Sources ==
- William West at Olympedia
