= Francisco Quina =

Portuguese sailor

Personal information
- Nationality: Portuguese
- Born: 24 December 1930
- Died: 10 November 2006 (aged 75)

Sport
- Sport: Sailing

Francisco Quina (24 December 1930 – 10 November 2006) was a Portuguese sailor. He competed in the Dragon event at the 1972 Summer Olympics.
