= Jochen Wolfram =

German yacht racer (born 1966)

Jochen Wolfram (born 22 December 1966) is a German former yacht racer who competed in the 2004 Summer Olympics.
