= Juan Feld =

Venezuelan sailor

Personal information
- Nationality: Venezuelan
- Born: 22 June 1923
- Died: February 2008

Sport
- Sport: Sailing

Juan Feld (22 June 1923 – February 2008) was a Venezuelan sailor. He competed in the Star event at the 1964 Summer Olympics.
