= Marc Aurel Pickel =

German yacht racer

Marc Aurel Pickel (born 12 December 1971) is a German former yacht racer who competed in the 2000 Summer Olympics and in the 2008 Summer Olympics.
