= Kálmán Tolnai =

Hungarian sailor

Personal information
- Nationality: Hungarian
- Born: 28 November 1924; Balatonfüred, Hungary
- Died: 14 September 2010 (aged 85); Zalaegerszeg, Hungary

Sport
- Sport: Sailing

Kálmán Tolnai (28 November 1924 – 14 September 2010) was a Hungarian sailor. He competed at the 1960 Summer Olympics and the 1968 Summer Olympics.
