= Mariano Lucca =

Argentine sailor

Personal information
- Full name: Mariano Daniel Lucca
- Nationality: Argentine
- Born: 8 June 1967 (age 58)
- Height: 190 cm (6 ft 3 in)

Sport
- Sport: Sailing

Mariano Daniel Lucca (born 8 June 1967) is an Argentine sailor. He competed in the Star event at the 2000 Summer Olympics.
