= Bruno Splieth =

German sailor

Bruno Splieth (20 January 1917 – 20 July 1990) was a German sailor who competed in the 1960 Summer Olympics and in the 1964 Summer Olympics.
