= Viktor Solovyov (sailor) =

Russian sailor

Personal information
- Born: 23 April 1957 (age 69)
- Height: 180 cm (5 ft 11 in)
- Weight: 84 kg (185 lb)

Sport
- Sport: Sailing

Viktor Vladimirovich Solovyov (Russian: Виктор Владимирович Соловьёв; born 23 April 1957) is a retired Russian sailor. He competed in the mixed two-person keelboat (Star class) at the 1988 and 1996 Olympics and placed 8th and 17th, respectively.
