= Harald von Musil =

Austrian sailor

Personal information
- Nationality: Austrian
- Born: 13 January 1908; Vienna, Austria-Hungary
- Died: 1987 (aged 78–79)

Sport
- Sport: Sailing

Harald von Musil (13 January 1908 – 1987) was an Austrian sailor. He competed at the 1948 Summer Olympics, the 1952 Summer Olympics and the 1960 Summer Olympics.
