= Hans Wallén =

Swedish sailor

Personal information
- Full name: Hans Carl Johan Wallén
- Born: 19 January 1961 (age 65) Uppsala, Sweden

Sailing career
- Sport: Sailing
- Class(es): Star, Soling, 11:Metre
Medal record
Sailing
Representing Sweden
Olympic Games
Silver medal – second place	1996 Atlanta	Star
World Championships
Gold medal – first place	1976 Turkey	Optimist
Gold medal – first place	1978 Skovshoved	Europe
Silver medal – second place	1993 Kiel	Star

Hans Carl Johan Wallén (born 19 January 1961) is a Swedish sailor. He won a silver medal in the Star class at the 1996 Summer Olympics with Bobby Lohse. He, together with Lohse, also has a silver medal from the 1993 Star World Championships in Kiel.
