= Killian Collins =

Irish yacht racer

- Born: 11 April 1978 (age 47)
- Occupation: yacht racer

Killian Collins (born 11 April 1978) is an Irish former yacht racer who competed in the 2004 Summer Olympics. Collins now has a career in storage engineering at EMC.
