= Stuart Jardine =

British sailor (1933–2023)

Personal information
- Nationality: British
- Born: 23 August 1933; Salisbury, England
- Died: 7 November 2023 (aged 90); Lymington, England

Sport
- Sport: Sailing

Stuart Jardine (23 August 1933 – 7 November 2023) was a British sailor. He competed at the 1968 Summer Olympics and the 1972 Summer Olympics. Jardine died in Lymington on 7 November 2023, at the age of 90.
