= Steven Kelly (sailor) =

Bahamian sailor

- Born: Stephen Kenneth Kelly; February 15, 1955 (age 71); Bahamas
- Occupation: CEO
- Known for: Olympic sailor

Steven Kelly (born Stephen Kenneth Kelly, 15 February 1955) is a businessman and Olympian best known for having competed three times in the Olympic Games. He represented the Bahamas as an Olympic sailor in the Summer Olympics of 1984, 1988 and 1992. He is currently the CEO of Odyssey Aviation, an international flight handling business which offers private aviation services.

== Personal life ==
He was born in the Bahamas in 1955, the son of Basil T Kelly CBE and Joan Paula Kelly. He attended McDonogh School, in Baltimore and Babson College, Wellesley, Massachusetts. He went on to attend the University of Miami. He is also the owner of the Bahamas Iron & Steel Company Limited. A general construction company he bought in 1981 and ran until 1996, when he went into the aviation industry and founded Odyssey Aviation where he currently works. In 2010, Steven was awarded the Paul Harris Fellow award by the Rotary Club of Nassau in recognition of his longtime commitment to both the Rotary Club and the Bahamian community.

== Olympics ==
Steven has competed at three Olympic games, in the Mixed two person keelboat event. In the Summer Olympics of 1984, he was the skipper of the Bahamas Olympic sailing team, ranking tenth in the results table. In 1988 he competed again, under skipper Durward Knowles, they were placed 19th in the results table. He was skipper again in 1992 placed 17th. He has not won any Olympic medals.

== Sailing history ==
- Nov 06. Star - Men - Star North American Championship, Miami, USA 200 36
- Sep 06. Star - Men - Star World Championship, San Francisco, USA W 35
- Jan 06. Star - Men - Rolex Miami OCR, Biscayne Bay, Miami, Florida, USA 1 37
- Aug 05. Star - Men - Star North American Championship, Marina del Ray, California, USA 200 16
- Apr 05. Star - Men - Star Western Hemisphere Championship, Nassau, BAH 200 14
- Jan 04. Star - Men - Rolex Miami OCR, Biscayne Bay, Miami, Florida, USA 1 39
- May 3. Star - Men - Star Spring Championship of the Western Hemisphere, Gull Lake, Michigan, USA 200 10
- Jan 03. Star - Men - Rolex Miami OCR, Miami, Florida, USA 1 40
- Aug 02. Star - Men - Nautica - Star World Championship, Marina del Rey, California, USA W 53
- May 00. Star - Men - Star World Championship, Annapolis, MD, USA W 35
- Mar 00. Star - Men - Bacardi Cup, Miami, Florida, USA 200 24
- Mar 94. Star - Men - BACARDI CUP 1995, CORAL REEF YC, USA 50 14
- Jul 92. Star - Open - 1992 Barcelona Olympic Games Sailing Competition, Barcelona, ESP 17
- Sep 91. Star - Men - STAR NORTH AMERICANS 1991, Illinois, USA 7
- Sep 88. Star - Open - 1988 Seoul Olympic Games Sailing Competition, Pusan, KOR
