= Enrico De Maria =

Swiss sailor

Medal record

Sailing

Representing Switzerland

Olympic Games
Silver medal – second place	2000 Sydney	Star

5.5 Metre World Championship
Gold medal – first place	2004 Torbole	5.5m

Enrico De Maria (born 20 December 1976 in Rüti) is a Swiss Olympic Star class sailor. He has been crewing for Flavio Marazzi in the 2004, 2008 and 2012 Summer Olympics and finished fourth in the 2004 edition.

He was a grinder on Alinghi during the 2003 America's Cup.
