= Noël Desaubliaux =

French sailor (1922–2019)

Personal information
- Nationality: French
- Born: 26 December 1922; Paris, France
- Died: 5 June 2019 (aged 96); Saint-Malo, France

Sport
- Sport: Sailing

Noël Desaubliaux (26 December 1922 – 5 June 2019) was a French sailor. He competed in the Star event at the 1960 Summer Olympics.
