= Georges Pisani =

French sailor

Personal information
- Nationality: French
- Born: 16 April 1918; Algiers, Algeria
- Died: 17 March 2008 (aged 89); Hyères, France

Sport
- Sport: Sailing

Georges Pisani (16 April 1918 – 17 March 2008) was a French sailor. He competed in the Star event at the 1960 Summer Olympics.
