= Hans Bryner =

Swiss sailor

Hans Robert Bryner (19 March 1911 – 30 May 1988) was a Swiss sailor who competed in the 1948 Summer Olympics, in the 1952 Summer Olympics, in the 1960 Summer Olympics, and in the 1964 Summer Olympics.
