= Vladimir Vasilyev (sailor) =

Soviet sailor

Personal information
- Native name: Владимир Васильевич Васильев
- Full name: Vladimir Vasilyevich Vasilyev
- Nationality: Soviet
- Born: 28 November 1935 Leningrad, Russian SFSR, Soviet Union
- Died: 28 January 2003 (aged 67) Klaipėda, Lithuania

Sport
- Sport: Sailing

Vladimir Vasilyevich Vasilyev (Russian: Владимир Васильевич Васильев; 28 November 1935 – 28 January 2003) was a Soviet sailor. He competed at the 1972 Summer Olympics and the 1976 Summer Olympics.
