= Fernando Bello (sailor, born 1957) =

Portuguese sailor

Personal information
- Nationality: Portuguese
- Born: 25 November 1957 (age 67); Lisbon, Portugal

Sport
- Sport: Sailing

Fernando Bello (born 25 November 1957) is a Portuguese sailor. He competed in the Star event at the 1992 Summer Olympics.
