= Julio Labandeira =

Argentine sailor

Personal information
- Nationality: Argentine
- Born: 12 August 1949 (age 75)

Sport
- Sport: Sailing

Julio Labandeira (born 12 August 1949) is an Argentine sailor. He competed in the Star event at the 1988 Summer Olympics.
