= René Nyman =

Finnish sailor (1916–1997)

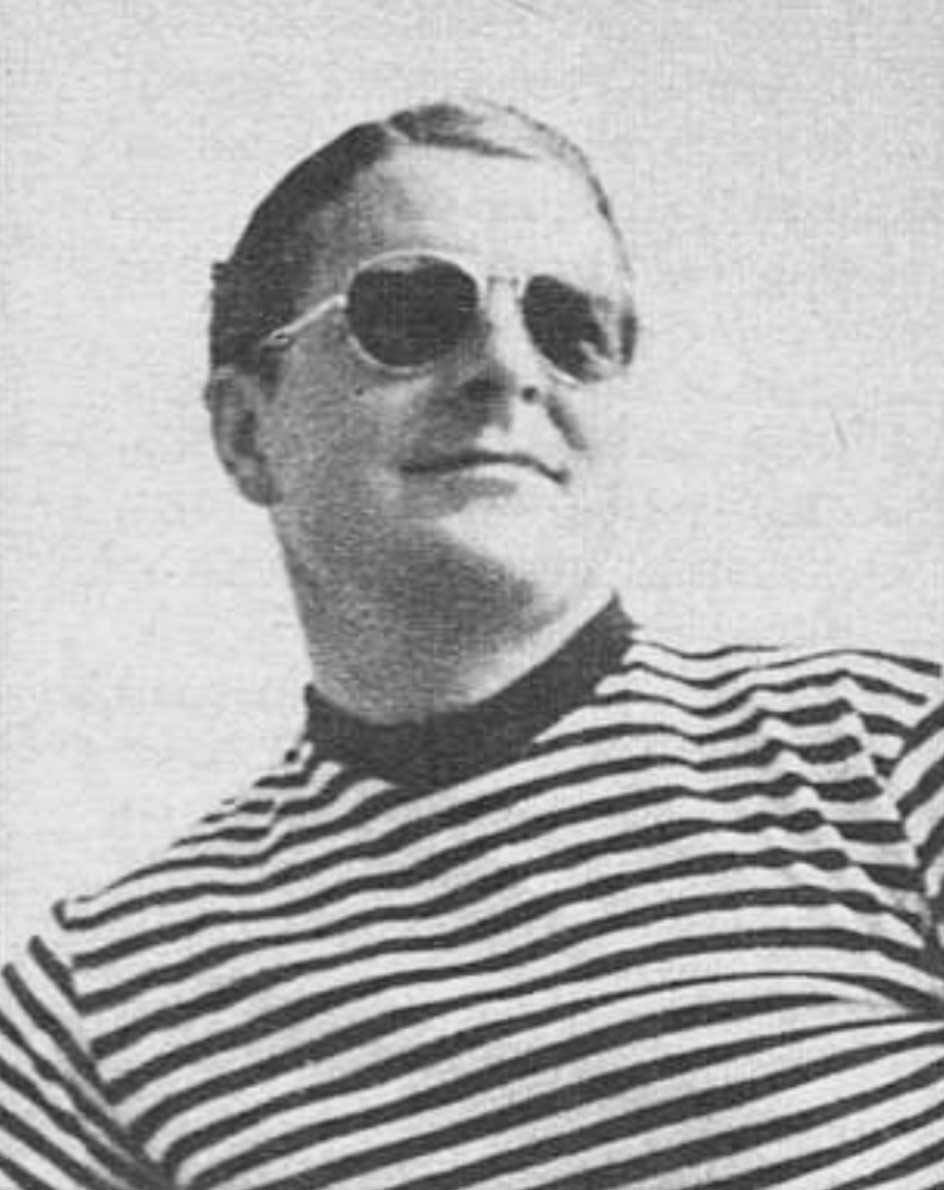

Personal information
- Full name: René Israel Nyman
- Nickname: René Nyman
- Nationality: Finnish
- Born: 21 November 1916 Helsinki, Finland
- Died: 19 May 1997 (aged 80) Helsinki, Finland

Sailing career
- Sport: Sailing

René Israel Nyman (21 November 1916 – 19 May 1997) was a Finnish Olympic sailor in the Dragon, Star, and O-Jolle classes. He competed in the 1936 Summer Olympics, 1948 Summer Olympics, 1952 Summer Olympics and the 1960 Summer Olympics
