= Bobby Lohse =

Swedish sailor

Medal record

Representing Sweden

Sailing

Olympic Games
Silver medal – second place	1996 Atlanta	Star class

Bobby Lohse (born 3 February 1958) is a Swedish sailor. He won a silver medal in the Star class at the 1996 Summer Olympics with Hans Wallén.
