= John Bodden (sailor) =

Caymanian sailor (born 1956)

Personal information
- Nationality: Caymanian
- Born: 30 May 1956 (age 68)

Sport
- Sport: Sailing

John Patrick Bodden (born 30 May 1956) is a Caymanian sailor. He competed at the 1984 Summer Olympics and the 1992 Summer Olympics.
