= Rolf Amrein =

Swiss sailor (1929–2019)

Personal information
- Nationality: Switzerland
- Born: 1 August 1929 Luzern, Switzerland
- Died: 20 April 2019 (aged 89)
- Height: 1.79 m (5 ft 10 in)
- Weight: 78 kg (172 lb)

Sailing career
- Sport: Sailing
- Club: Yachtclub Zug, Yachtclub Luzern
Medal record
Men's sailing
Representing Switzerland
European Championships
Bronze medal – third place	1964	Star

Rolf Amrein (1 August 1929 – 20 April 2019) was a Swiss sailor. He competed at the 1968 Summer Olympics and the 1972 Summer Olympics who specialized in two-person keelboat (Star) Class. He represented Switzerland, along with his partner Edwin Bernet and won the bronze medal in the Star European Championship 1964, they were called the Mystere.

== Rankings ==
European Championships
Year	Place	Ranking	Type		
1964	N/A	3° (Bronze)	Star		
Summer Olympics
Year	Place	Ranking	Type	Net Points	TP
1968	Mexico City, Mexico	8°	Star	75	94
1972	Munich, West Germany	14°	Star	99.7	125.7
