= Henrik Tallberg =

Finnish sailor (1942–2025)

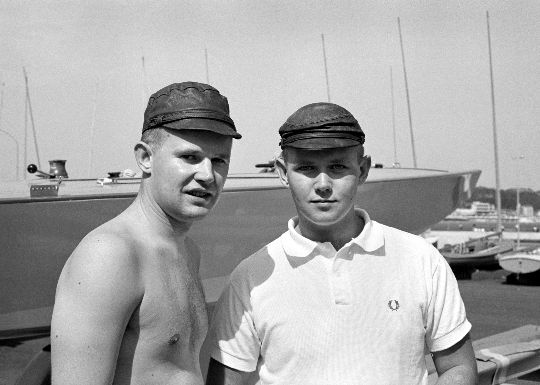
Finnish Olympic yachting team Peter Tallberg (1937–2015) and his brother Henrik Tallberg.

Henrik Tallberg (3 July 1942 – 19 December 2025) was a Finnish sailor who competed in the 1964 Summer Olympics and in the 1968 Summer Olympics.

Tallberg died in Helsinki on 19 December 2025, at the age of 83.
