= Alberto Zanetti =

Argentine sailor

Personal information
- Full name: Alberto E. A. Zanetti Spaggiari
- Nationality: Argentine
- Born: 2 May 1956 (age 68)
- Height: 185 cm (6 ft 1 in)
- Weight: 92 kg (203 lb)

Sailing career
- Class: Star
- Club: Club Náutico Olivos

Alberto E. A. Zanetti Spaggiari (Note: In this Spanish name, the first or paternal surname is Zanetti and the second or maternal family name is Spaggiari.) (born 2 May 1956) is an Argentine sailor. He competed at the 1988 Summer Olympics and the 1992 Summer Olympics.
