= Marcelo Ferreira =

Brazilian sailor (born 1965)

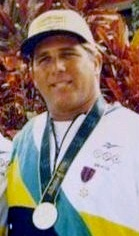
- Ferreira in 2006

Personal information
- Full name: Marcelo Bastos Ferreria
- Born: 26 September 1965 (age 60) Niterói, Rio de Janeiro, Brazil
- Height: 1.81 m (5 ft 11 1/2 in)
- Weight: 104 kg (229 lb)

Sailing career
- Sport: Sailing
- Class(es): Star, Volvo 70
Medal record
Sailing
Representing Brazil
Olympic Games
Gold medal – first place	1996 Atlanta	Star class
Gold medal – first place	2004 Athens	Star class
Bronze medal – third place	2000 Sydney	Star class
World Championships
Gold medal – first place	1990 Cleveland	Star class
Gold medal – first place	1997 Marblehead	Star class
Silver medal – second place	1991 Cannes	Star class
Silver medal – second place	1995 Laredo	Star class
Silver medal – second place	1998 Portorož	Star class
Silver medal – second place	2002 Marina del Rey	Star class
Silver medal – second place	2005 Buenos Aires	Star class
Bronze medal – third place	1994 San Diego	Star class
Bronze medal – third place	1996 Rio de Janeiro	Star class

Marcelo Bastos Ferreria (Note: This name uses Portuguese naming customs: the first or maternal family name is Bastos and the second or paternal family name is Ferreria.) (born 26 September 1965) is a Brazilian sailor and Olympic champion. He received a gold medal in the Star Class at the 1996 Summer Olympics in Atlanta with Torben Grael. He received a bronze medal at the 2000 Summer Olympics in Sydney, and won a gold medal at the 2004 Summer Olympics in Athens.

Ferreira is World champion from 1990 and 1997, and seven times Brazilian champion (1989, 1996, 1998, 2000, 2001, 2002 and 2003).

In 2005–06, he was a crewmember on Brasil 1 in the Volvo Ocean Race.
