= John Foster Jr. (sailor) =

US Virgin Islands sailor

John Parry Foster (born February 26, 1963) is a sailor from the US Virgin Islands who competed at three Olympics (1984, 1988 and 1992) in the two-person keelboat class. His sailing partner at the Olympics was his father John Foster Sr.
