= Daniel Camejo =

Venezuelan sailor

Personal information
- Full name: Daniel Camejo Octavio
- Born: 23 April 1914; Barquisimeto, Venezuela
- Died: 30 August 2008 (aged 94); Florida, United States

Sport
- Sport: Sailing

Daniel Camejo Octavio (Note: In this Spanish name, the first or paternal surname is Camejo and the second or maternal family name is Octavio.) (23 April 1914 – 30 August 2008) was a Venezuelan sailor. He competed at the 1960 Summer Olympics with his son Peter Camejo and the 1964 Summer Olympics.
