= Peter Tallberg =

Finnish sailor

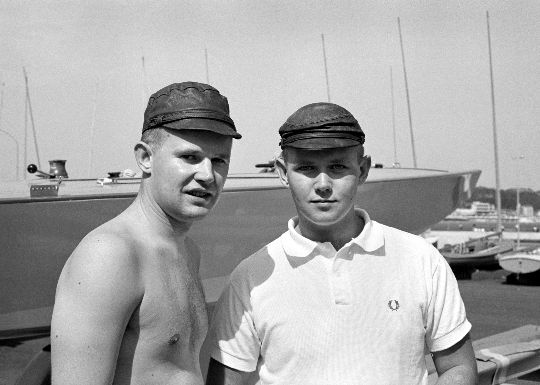
- Peter and Henrik Tallberg in 1964

Personal information
- Full name: Peter Julius Tallberg
- Nickname: Petski
- Nationality: Finnish
- Born: 15 July 1937 Helsinki, Finland
- Died: 16 May 2015 (aged 77) Helsinki, Finland
- Height: 1.78 m (5 ft 10 in)

Sailing career
- Sport: Sailing
- Club: Nyländska Jaktklubben
- Class: Soling
Medal record
Sailing
Representing Finland
World Championships
| Silver medal – second place | 1987 Hankø | 5.5m |

Peter Julius Tallberg (15 July 1937 – 16 May 2015) was a Finnish sailor who competed in the 1960 Summer Olympics, in the 1964 Summer Olympics, in the 1968 Summer Olympics, in the 1972 Summer Olympics, and in the 1980 Summer Olympics.

He was a member of International Olympic Committee since 1976. At the time of his death in 2015, his tenure was the second longest among members, after Vitali Smirnov. Tallberg died of cancer on 16 May 2015 at the age of 77.

He was the great-grandson of the businessman Julius Tallberg.
