= Fritz Kopperschmidt =

German sailor (1939–2011)

Fritz Kopperschmidt (22 December 1939 – 16 February 2011) was a German sailor who competed in the 1964 Summer Olympics and in the 1968 Summer Olympics. He was born in Hamburg.
