= Swiss Sailing =

- IOC nation: Switzerland (SUI)
- Sport: Sailing
- Official website: www.swiss-sailing.ch

HISTORY
- Year of formation: 1939

DEMOGRAPHICS
- Number of Sailing clubs: Approx. 140

AFFILIATIONS
- International federation: International Sailing Federation (ISAF)
- ISAF members page: www.sailing.org/about-isaf/mna/switzerland.php
- ISAF member since: 1940s
- Continental association: EUROSAF
- National Olympic Committee: Swiss Olympic Association
- Member of NPC since: Swiss Paralympic Committee

ELECTED
- President: Martin Vogler

SECRETARIAT
- Address: Haus des Sportes; Postfach 606; 3000 Bern 22
- Country: Switzerland
- Chief Executive: Ruedi CHRISTEN
- Olympic team manager: Rainer STAUB
- Number of staff: Approx. 6

FINANCE
- Company status: Association

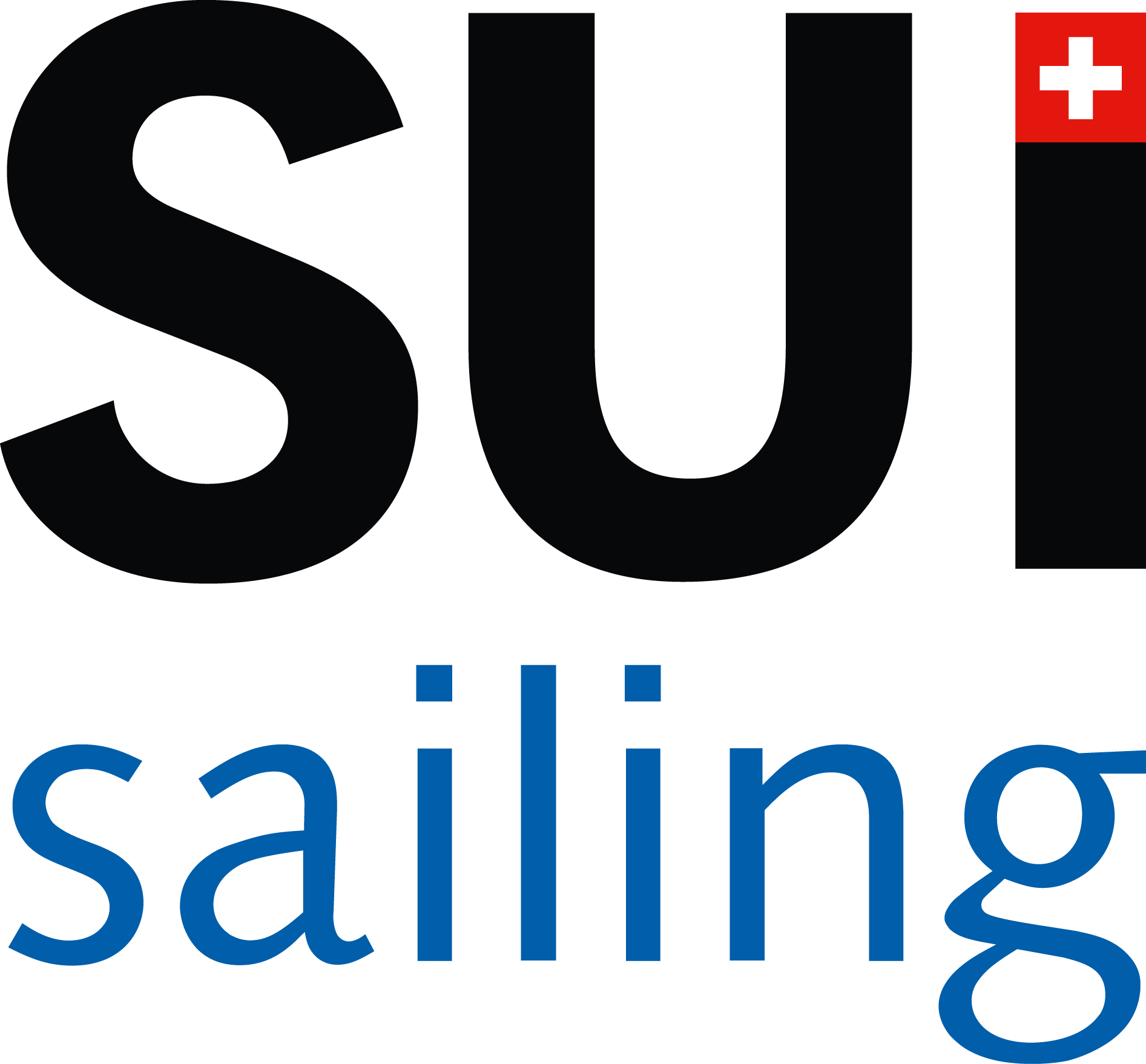

Swiss Sailing is the national governing body for the sport of sailing in Switzerland, recognised by the International Sailing Federation.

== Notable sailors ==
See Category:Swiss sailors

=== Olympic sailing ===
See Category:Olympic sailors of Switzerland

=== Offshore sailing ===
See Category:Swiss sailors (sport)
