= Leonidas Pelekanakis =

Greek sailor (1962–2021)

Personal information
- Nationality: Greek
- Born: 22 November 1962 Greece
- Died: 14 January 2021 (aged 58) Greece

Sport
- Sport: Sailing

Leonidas Pelekanakis (22 November 1962 – 14 January 2021) was a Greek sailor. He competed at the 1984 Summer Olympics, the 2000 Summer Olympics, and the 2004 Summer Olympics. Pelekanakis died of COVID-19 during the pandemic in Greece on 14 January 2021, after an almost two-month battle with the illness.
