= Flavio Marazzi =

Swiss sailor (born 1978)

Medal record

Sailing

Representing Switzerland

5.5 Metre World Championship
Gold medal – first place	2002 Helsinki	5.5m
Gold medal – first place	2004 Torbole	5.5m
Gold medal – first place	2006 Medemblik	5.5m
Gold medal – first place	2007 Sanremo	5.5m
Gold medal – first place	2010 Lake Garda	5.5m
Gold medal – first place	2014 Porto Santo Stefano	5.5m
Silver medal – second place	2008 Nassau	5.5m
Silver medal – second place	2012 Boltenhagen	5.5m

Flavio Marazzi (born 7 February 1978 in Bern) is a Swiss sailor. He has participated in four Olympics from 2000 to 2012 competing in the Star class keelboat, finishing fourth in the 2008 edition together with Enrico De Maria. Flavio Marazzi now sails on a GC32 Catamaran in the team BLACK STAR.

He is the brother of Renato Marazzi.
