= Mark Reynolds (sailor) =

American sailor

Personal information
- Full name: Mark Jeffrey Reynolds
- Nationality: American
- Born: November 2, 1955 (age 70) San Diego, California, U.S.

Sailing career
- Sport: Sailing
- Classes: Snipe, Star

Achievements and titles
- Olympic finals: Gold Medalist
Medal record
Sailing
Representing United States
Olympic Games
Gold medal – first place	1992 Barcelona	Star class
Gold medal – first place	2000 Sydney	Star class
Silver medal – second place	1988 Seoul	Star class
World Championships
Gold medal – first place	1995 Laredo	Star class
Gold medal – first place	2000 Annapolis	Star class
Silver medal – second place	1988 Buenos Aires	Star class
Silver medal – second place	1996 Rio de Janeiro	Star class
Silver medal – second place	1997 Laredo	Star class
Bronze medal – third place	1991 Cannes	Star class
Bronze medal – third place	1999 Punta Ala	Star class
Bronze medal – third place	2013 San Diego	Star class
Pan American Games
Gold medal – first place	1979 San Juan	Snipe class
Goodwill Games
Gold medal – first place	1986 Moscow	Star class

Mark Jeffrey Reynolds (born November 2, 1955) is an American Star class sailor and Olympic champion. He has sailed Stars since age four, training with his father James Reynolds who was the 1971 World Champion (as crew for Dennis Conner).

Reynolds competed at multiple Olympics, medaling in 1988 and 1992. In 1996 he came in eighth. Afterwards he formed a new partnership with crewman Magnus Liljedahl, and they went on to win a string of championships, culminating with a gold medal at the 2000 Olympics.

Reynolds sailed for San Diego State University, where he received a BS. As a sophomore, Mark was All American on the San Diego State University sailing team in 1974. Mark led the team to a 2nd place finish both in 1974 and 1975 in the North American Dinghy Championships. He also holds an honorary doctorate from Piedmont College. During the 2001–02 Volvo Ocean Race, he sailed with Team SEB.

He owns a sail making company. He made the sails for almost all of his Star class competitors.

Non-Olympic achievements:

- Snipe
  - 1978 US National Champion
  - 1979 Worlds runner up
  - 1979 Pan American games gold medal
  - 1980,1982 & 1991 North American Champion
- Star
  - 1995 & 2000 World Champion
  - 10 times Continental Champion
  - 1998 & 2002 North American Champion
  - 1984, 1989, 1990, 1993, 1997, 1998 & 2002 Bacardi Cup Champion
  - 2001 & 2002 Commodores Cup Champion
  - 2004 Rolex Miami OCR Champion
- Farr 40
  - 2002 World Champion (tactician)

== Awards ==
- 1975 Intercollegiate Yacht Racing Association (ICYRA) All-American
- 1989 & 1992 U.S. Olympic Committee Athlete of the Year for Sailing
- 2000 ISAF World Sailor of the Year
- 2000 US Sailor of the Year
- 2002 Sailing World's Hall of Fame
- 2012 National Sailing Hall of Fame
