= Torben Grael =

Brazilian sailor

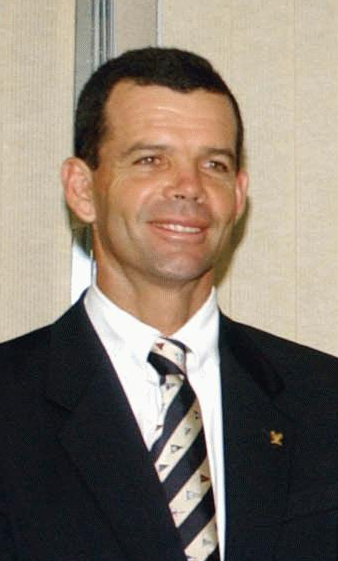
- Grael in 2003

Personal information
- Full name: Torben Schmidt Grael
- Nickname: Turbine
- Nationality: Brazilian
- Born: 22 July 1960 (age 66) São Paulo, SP, Brazil
- Children: Marco Grael; Martine Grael

Sailing career
- Sport: Sailing
- Club: (Brazil) Rio Yacht Club
- Classes: Soling, Star
Medal record
Sailing
Representing Brazil
Olympic Games
Gold medal – first place	1996 Atlanta	Star class
Gold medal – first place	2004 Athens	Star class
Silver medal – second place	1984 Los Angeles	Soling class
Bronze medal – third place	1988 Seoul	Star class
Bronze medal – third place	2000 Sydney	Star class

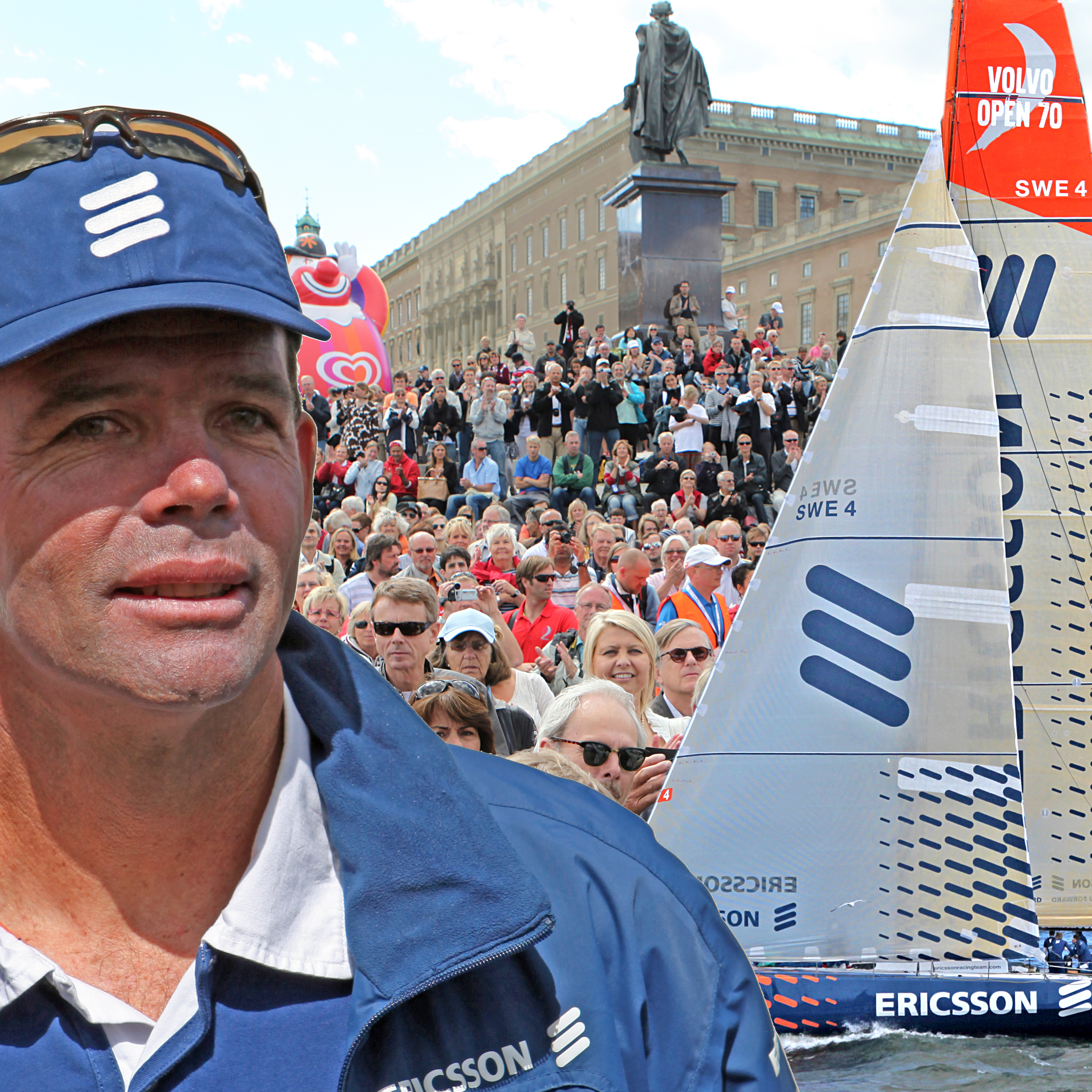
Torben Grael, skipper of Ericsson 4 and overall winner of the Volvo Ocean Race 2009

Torben Schmidt Grael (born 22 July 1960) is one of the most well known Brazilian sailors, renowned in international competitions. A descendant of Danes, he was taken sailing by his grandfather at the age of five years on the sailboat Aileen, of the 6 Metre class, which was the boat used by the silver medal-winning 1912 Summer Olympics Danish sailing team. Once he moved to Niterói, he started sailing with his brother, Lars Grael, also an Olympic medal winner, on the Bay of Guanabara. Another brother, Axel Grael, is the current mayor of Niterói. He is father of Olympic champion Martine Grael and sailor Marco Grael. Nicknamed Turbine for his fame in conducting sailboats, he collected five Olympic medals, four of them in the Star class.

== Sailing Career ==
=== Olympic Sailing ===
He is the Brazilian with the highest number of Olympic medals alongside Robert Scheidt; and holds the highest number of Olympic medals in sailing (five) together with Scheidt and the Briton Ben Ainslie, followed by Paul Elvstrøm with four; together, the four are often considered the greatest sailors in Olympic history. He also placed first place in many World-, South American- and Brazilian Championships in several categories. His crewmate is usually Marcelo Ferreira.

Year	Event	Venue	Class	Result
2004	XXVIII Olympic Games	Athens, Greece	Star	1st
2000	XXVII Olympic Games	Sydney, Australia	Star	3rd
1996	XXVI Olympic Games	Atlanta, United States	Star	1st
1992	XXV Olympic Games	Barcelona, Spain	Star	11th
1988	XXIV Olympic Games	Seoul, South Korea	Star	3rd
1984	XXIII Olympic Games	Los Angeles, U.S.	Soling	2nd

=== World Championships ===
Year	Event	Class	Result
2024	12mR World Championship	12 Metre Grand Prix	1
2014	Star World Championship	Star Open	9
2012	Farr 40 World Championship	Farr 40 Open	2
2010	Star World Championship	Star Men	3
2007	ISAF Sailing World Championships	Star Men	13
2006	Star World Championship	Star Men	17
2005	Star World Championship	Star Men	2
2004	Star World Championship	Star Men	15
2003	ISAF Sailing World Championships	Star Men	32
2002	Star World Championship	Star Men	2
2001	Star World Championship	Star Men	4
2000	Star World Championship	Star Men	18
1999	Star World Championship	Star Men	12
1998	Star World Championship	Star Men	2
1997	Mumm 36 World Championship	Mumm 36 Open	7
1996	Mumm 36 World Championship	Mumm 36 Open	5
1996	Star World Championship	Star Men	3
1995	Star World Championship	Star Men	2
1994	Star World Championship	Star Men	3
1993	Star World Championship	Star Open	5
1991	One Ton Cup	One Ton	2
1991	3/4 Ton Cup	3/4 Ton	3
1991	Star World Championship	Star Open	2
1990	Star World Championship	Star Open	1
1989	Star World Championship	Star Open	18
1989	Open Snipe World Championship	Snipe Open	2
1988	Star World Championship	Star Open	5
1987	Open Snipe World Championship	Snipe Open	1
1985	Soling World Championship	Soling Open	2
1983	Open Snipe World Championship	Snipe Open	1
1983	Soling World Championship	Soling Open	8
1981	Open Snipe World Championship	Snipe Open	3
1981	Finn World Championship (Gold Cup)	Finn Open	32
1978	Youth Snipe World Championship	Snipe Open	1

=== Other Dinghy Events ===
Year	Event	Venue	Class	Result
1980	Sailing Olympic Week	Cork, Ireland	Soling	1st
1981	North-American Championship	Sarnia, Ontario, Canada	Soling	1st
1983	IX Pan American Games	Caracas, Venezuela	Soling	1st
1984	Sailing Olympic Week	Sanremo, Italy	Soling	1st
1984	Mediterranean Championship	Sanremo, Italy	Soling	1st
1987	X Pan American Games	Indianapolis, Indiana, U.S.	Soling	3rd
1989	European Championship	Travemünde, Lübeck, SH, Germany	Star	1st
1990	European Championship	Lake Balaton, Hungary	Star	1st
1990	Sailing Olympic Week	Kiel, Schleswig-Holstein, Germany	Star	1st
1991	European Championship	Palermo, Italy	Star	1st

=== Offshore/Oceanic Sailing ===
He was skipper of Brasil 1 in the 2005–06 Volvo Ocean Race, the first 100% Brazilian outfit to enter the competition, which finished third overall. He would win the next Ocean Race, but this time as the skipper of the Swedish team Ericsson 4 (he won the race with two legs to spare). In October 2008 the yacht Ericsson 4 officially travelled 596.6 nautical miles in 24 hours, establishing a 24-hour monohull record. Skipper Torben Grael and his crew made the record on the first leg of the 2008–2009 Volvo Ocean Race. They sailed Ericsson 4 hard as a strong cold front hit the fleet, bringing winds approaching 40 knots, and propelling the yacht at an average speed of 24.8 knots.

=== America Cup ===
He has sailed in several America's Cup races, including the winning campaign in Louis Vuitton Cup in 2000 and the 2007 event as tactician aboard Luna Rossa Challenge

Olympic Games
Preceded by Mirella Arnhold	Flagbearer for Brazil; Athens 2004	Succeeded by Isabel Clark Ribeiro
