= Timir Pinegin =

Soviet sailor

Medal record

Sailing

Representing Soviet Union

Olympic Games
Gold medal – first place	1960 Rome	Star class

Timir Alekseevich Pinegin (Russian: Тимир Алексеевич Пинегин; 12 June 1927 – 31 January 2013) was a Russian sailor who competed for the Soviet Union in the 1956 Summer Olympics, in the 1960 Summer Olympics, in the 1964 Summer Olympics, in the 1968 Summer Olympics, and in the 1972 Summer Olympics.

Pinegin was born in Moscow. In 1956 he finished eighth as helmsman of the Soviet boat Tulilind (lit. Firebird in Estonian) in the Star class competition.

Four years later he won the gold medal as helmsman of the Soviet boat Tornado in the Star class event.

In 1964 he finished fifth in the Star class competition, 1968 he finished 16th in the Star class event. At all four Olympics from 1956 to 1968 he competed with his partner Fyodor Shutkov.

In 1972 he competed in the Soling class competition and finished seventh.
