= Pietro D'Alì =

Italian yacht racer

Pietro D'Ali (born 5 July 1963) is an Italian former yacht racer who competed in the 2000 Summer Olympics.

He sailed on Brooksfield in the 1993–94 Whitbread Round the World Race.

He joined Prada Challenge and was part of their campaigns for the 2000 and 2003 Louis Vuitton Cup.
