= Dimitrios Boukis =

Greek sailor

Personal information
- Native name: Δημήτριος Μπούκης
- Nationality: Greek
- Born: 18 December 1963 (age 61); Athens, Greece
- Height: 187 cm (6 ft 2 in)
- Weight: 116 kg (256 lb)

Sailing career
- Class: Star

Dimitrios Boukis (Greek: Δημήτριος Μπούκης; born 18 December 1963) is a Greek former sailor. He competed at the 1992 Summer Olympics, the 1996 Summer Olympics, and the 2000 Summer Olympics.
