= Fyodor Shutkov =

Russian sailor

Olympic medal record

Sailing

Representing Soviet Union
Gold medal – first place	1960 Rome	Star class

Fyodor Vasilevich Shutkov (Russian: Фёдор Васильевич Шутков; 15 February 1924 – 18 December 2001) was a Russian sailor who competed for the Soviet Union in the Summer Olympics of 1952, 1956, 1960, 1964, and 1968.

He first competed in the 1952 6-metre class competition, as crew member of the Soviet boat Circe which finished eleventh. His subsequent Olympic competition was in the Star class as crew member, each time with Timir Pinegin as skipper.

- 1956 results, finished eighth in the Soviet boat Tulilind.
- 1960 results, Gold Medal in the Soviet boat Tornado.
- 1964 results, finished fifth in the Soviet boat Taifun.
- 1968 results, finished 16th in the Soviet boat.
