= Eckart Wagner =

German sailor

Eckart Johannes Wagner (4 July 1938 – 31 October 2002) was a German sailor who competed in the 1960 Summer Olympics, in the 1964 Summer Olympics, and in the 1968 Summer Olympics. He was born in Kiel.

After earning his law degree, he met Lowell North during the 1964 Olympics and subsequently established North Sails first European loft. He played a pivotal role in expanding the company's presence in Europe and later founded North Sails Surf, focusing on windsurfing sails. Under his leadership, the company grew significantly, with operations in Sri Lanka employing hundreds of people.
