= Lee White (sailor) =

Bermudian sailor

Personal information
- Nationality: Bermudian
- Born: 13 September 1957 (age 67)

Sport
- Sport: Sailing

Lee White (born 13 September 1957) is a Bermudian sailor. He competed at the 1996 Summer Olympics, the 2000 Summer Olympics, and the 2004 Summer Olympics.
