= Mark Mansfield =

Irish yacht racer

Mark Mansfield (born 11 May 1962) is an Irish former yacht racer who competed in the 1992 Summer Olympics, in the 1996 Summer Olympics, in the 2000 Summer Olympics, and in the 2004 Summer Olympics.
