= 1979 Star World Championships =

Event title
- Edition: 56th

Event details
- Venue: Marstrand, Sweden
- Dates: 1979
- Yachts: Star

Competitors
- Competitors: 156
- Competing nations: 17

Results
- (gold) Gold: (United States) Melges & Josenhans
- (silver) Silver: (United States) Buchan & Knight
- (bronze) Bronze: (United States) Wright & Cozzens

The 1979 Star World Championships were held in Marstrand, Sweden in 1979.

== Results ==
Results of individual races
| Pos | Crew | Country | I | II | III | IV | V | VI | Pts |
|---|---|---|---|---|---|---|---|---|---|
| Gold medal | Buddy Melges (H); Andreas Josenhans | United States | 4 | 1 | 1 | 5 | 11 | WDR | 35 |
| Silver medal | Bill Buchan, Jr. (H); Douglas Knight | United States | 2 | 3 | 10 | 16 | 9 | DSQ | 61.7 |
| Bronze medal | Peter Wright (H); Todd Cozzens | United States | 38 | 28 | 5 | 3 | 3 | 4 | 63.4 |
| 4 | Peter Sundelin (H); Håkan Lindström | Sweden | 3 | 6 | 26 | 1 | - | 10 | 65.4 |
| 5 | Giorgio Gorla (H); Alfio Peraboni | Italy | 5 | 4 | 18 | 36 | 10 | 6 | 69.7 |
| 6 | Pelle Petterson (H); Stellan Westerdahl | Sweden | 1 | 15 | 6 | 18 | 18 | 9 | 71.7 |
| 7 | Eckart Wagner (H); Jorg Moessnang | West Germany | 7 | 22 | 36 | 2 | 5 | 21 | 81 |
| 8 | Valentin Mankin (H); Alexandr Muzychenko | Soviet Union | 15 | 5 | 35 | 13 | 6 | 16 | 83.7 |
| 9 | James M. Schoonmaker (H); Tog Rogers | United States | 6 | 8 | 7 | 26 | 12 | DSQ | 88.7 |
| 10 | Flavio Scala (H); Mauro Testa | Italy | 45 | 18 | 3 | 14 | 38 | 1 | 93.7 |
| 11 | Hubert Raudashl (H); Karl Ferstl | Austria | 21 | 34 | 9 | 7 | 23 | 5 | 94 |
| 12 | Boudewijn Binkhorst (H); Rob Douze | Netherlands | 9 | 11 | 21 | 19 | 8 | DSQ | 98 |
| 13 | Alexander Hagen (H); Vincent Hoesch | West Germany | 13 | 17 | 31 | 11 | - | 3 | 101.7 |
| 14 | Thomas Lundqvist (H); Håkan Berntsson | Sweden | 23 | 23 | 12 | 9 | 7 | - | 104 |
| 15 | Tom Blackaller (H); Ron Anderson | United States | 51 | 2 | 2 | 38 | 1 | DSQ | 107 |
| 16 | Eduardo de Souza (H); Peter Erzberger | Brazil | 8 | 38 | 8 | 12 | 16 | 35 | 109 |
| 17 | William Gerard (H); Paul Cayard | United States | - | 14 | 15 | 32 | 31 | 2 | 119 |
| 18 | David Forbes (H); Stephen Forbes | Australia | 26 | 33 | 23 | 8 | 14 | 22 | 123 |
| 19 | Stig Wennerström (H); Lennart Roslund | Sweden | 41 | 26 | 43 | 23 | 2 | 7 | 124 |
| 20 | Bengt Larsson (H); Göran Tell | Sweden | 25 | 27 | 61 | 6 | 20 | 19 | 126.7 |
| 21 | Jens Christensen (H); Morten Nielsen | Denmark | 33 | 12 | 19 | 17 | 29 | 20 | 127 |
| 22 | A. B. Kimball (H); Gunther Haack | United States | 10 | 25 | 27 | 10 | 54 | 25 | 127 |
| 23 | David Howlett (H); John Boyce | Great Britain | - | 16 | 24 | 22 | 32 | 11 | 135 |
| 24 | John Albrechtson (H); Sture Christensson | Sweden | 42 | 21 | 4 | 27 | 30 | 26 | 136 |
| 25 | Paul Louie (H); Chuck Lawson | Canada | 20 | 13 | 17 | 39 | 25 | 33 | 138 |
| 26 | Heinz Maurer (H); Peter Herzog | Switzerland | 28 | 29 | 16 | - | 22 | 17 | 142 |
| 27 | Ben Staartjes (H); Kobus Vandenberg | Netherlands | 27 | 36 | 11 | 15 | 33 | 34 | 150 |
| 28 | Uwe Mares (H); Kid Borowy | West Germany | 31 | 7 | 20 | 47 | 17 | - | 152 |
| 29 | Joachim Griese (H); Jurgen Homeyer | West Germany | 11 | 24 | 38 | 25 | 24 | - | 152 |
| 30 | Uwe von Below (H); Franz Wehofsich | West Germany | 16 | - | 22 | 4 | - | 8 | 157 |
| 31 | Flemming Hansen (H); Niels Andersen | Denmark | 39 | 9 | 28 | - | 27 | 30 | 163 |
| 32 | Tryg Liljestrand (H); Carl Blomquist | United States | 12 | 43 | 13 | 42 | 34 | 32 | 163 |
| 33 | Peter Tallberg (H); Mathias Tallberg | Finland | 49 | 30 | 33 | 45 | 21 | 14 | 173 |
| 34 | Antonio Gorostegui (H); Victor Gorostegui | Spain | 29 | 20 | 25 | 51 | 39 | 36 | 179 |
| 35 | Hartmut Voigt (H); Uwe Heinzmann | West Germany | 18 | 44 | - | 31 | 36 | 24 | 183 |
| 36 | Horst Nebel (H); Dieter Wacker | West Germany | 24 | 35 | 65 | 33 | 35 | 27 | 184 |
| 37 | Ortwin Semmerow (H); Rolf Scholtz | West Germany | 36 | 32 | 39 | 20 | 28 | - | 185 |
| 38 | Paul Henderson (H); Bruce Brymer | Canada | 19 | - | - | 21 | 13 | 28 | 190 |
| 39 | Olle Johansson (H); Bengt Andersson | Sweden | 54 | 19 | 41 | - | 26 | 23 | 193 |
| 40 | Johan Schröder (H); Ulf Schröder | Sweden | 47 | 41 | 29 | 63 | 40 | 18 | 205 |
| 41 | Robert McNeil (H); R. Johnson | United States | 22 | - | 14 | - | 47 | 15 | 216 |
| 42 | Barton S. Beek (H); William Munster | United States | 46 | - | - | 28 | 4 | 31 | 216 |
| 43 | Marcello Adorno (H); Daniel Wilcox | Brazil | 14 | 57 | 44 | 37 | 52 | 41 | 218 |
| 44 | Kim Fletcher (H); William Kreysler | United States | 32 | 46 | 40 | - | 59 | 13 | 220 |
| 45 | Albino Fravezzi (H); Oscar Dalvit | Italy | - | 10 | 53 | 34 | 15 | - | 221 |
| 45 | Heinz Nixdorf (H); Josef Pieper | West Germany | 59 | 50 | 30 | 49 | 55 | 12 | 226 |
| 47 | Bengt Hellsten (H); G. Schultz | Sweden | - | 39 | 42 | 29 | 42 | 45 | 227 |
| 48 | Jochen Schwarz (H); Dieter Wuerdig | West Germany | - | 45 | 37 | 44 | 19 | 46 | 231 |
| 49 | Mogens Nielsen (H); Mogens Pedersen | Denmark | 30 | 31 | 50 | 41 | 51 | - | 233 |
| 50 | Alan Warren (H); Robin Pullinger | Great Britain | 17 | 48 | 62 | 24 | 38 | - | 239 |
| 51 | Ludwig Buedel (H); Erwin Pamp | West Germany | 56 | 51 | 47 | 35 | 44 | 42 | 249 |
| 52 | F. Nabuco (H); Jorge Zarif Neto | Brazil | 55 | 47 | 48 | 56 | 43 | 29 | 252 |
| 53 | Stef Scheuregger (H); H. Braun | West Germany | 43 | 52 | 63 | 30 | - | 38 | 256 |
| 54 | Werner Landau (H); Daniel Wyss | Switzerland | 46 | 56 | 46 | 57 | 53 | 37 | 266 |
| 55 | Sune Carlsson (H); Leif Carlsson | Sweden | 58 | 61 | 66 | 43 | 41 | 40 | 275 |
| 56 | Wolfgang Richter (H); Peter Richter | Brazil | 37 | 62 | 60 | 58 | 45 | 47 | 277 |
| 57 | Sven Karlsson (H); Lars Andersson | Sweden | 35 | - | 36 | 55 | 48 | - | 281 |
| 58 | William Parks (H); Warren B. Cozzens | United States | 66 | 37 | 32 | 40 | DNS | DNS | 284 |
| 59 | Josef Steinmayer (H); Bernfried Osterwald | Switzerland | 52 | - | 51 | 66 | 50 | 39 | 288 |
| 60 | Timothy A. Owens (H); Robert Cox | Australia | 40 | 40 | 45 | 49 | - | - | 293 |
| 61 | Dierk Thomsen (H); W. Mehner | West Germany | 65 | 58 | 56 | 53 | 56 | 43 | 296 |
| 62 | Al Strohmayer (H); F. Hehinger | Austria | 62 | 61 | 55 | - | 49 | 44 | 301 |
| 63 | Josef Urban (H); Jochen Peters | Austria | 53 | 42 | 54 | 48 | - | - | 306 |
| 64 | Lars Berg (H); Richard Berg | Sweden | 70 | 66 | 70 | 61 | 46 | 50 | 321 |
| 65 | Peter D. Siemsen (H); Torben Grael | Brazil | 50 | 49 | 49 | 65 | - | - | 322 |
| 66 | Arnold Winkler (H); Francesco Rossi | Switzerland | 36 | 65 | 52 | 69 | - | - | 329 |
| 67 | Fernando Pombo (H); Luis Vina | Spain | 68 | 53 | 58 | 64 | 60 | - | 333 |
| 68 | Francoise Brenac (H); Yves Taylor | France | - | 60 | - | 50 | 37 | - | 335 |
| 69 | Erwin Joras (H); J. Hain | Netherlands | 71 | 67 | 64 | 67 | 61 | 48 | 337 |
| 70 | Max Juchli (H); Willi Spellbrink | West Germany | 48 | 55 | 57 | 70 | - | - | 339 |
| 71 | Gui. Calegari (H); Alberto Zanetti | Argentina | 63 | 68 | 69 | - | 62 | 49 | 341 |
| 72 | Horst Loos (H); Georg Beck | West Germany | 69 | 54 | 67 | 68 | 57 | - | 345 |
| 73 | Willy Schlosser (H); B. Juergens | West Germany | 61 | 59 | 59 | 62 | - | - | 350 |
| 74 | Phillip R. Baker (H); Colin Bate | Australia | 64 | 66 | 68 | 44 | - | - | 351 |
| 75 | Lars Engelbert (H); Lars Unger | Sweden | 60 | - | - | 46 | - | - | 373 |
| 76 | Franco de Denaro (H); J. Pezzotti | Italy | 57 | - | - | 52 | - | - | 376 |
| 77 | Harald Wirth (H); R. Herber | Austria | 72 | 69 | - | 71 | 63 | - | 384 |
| 78 | John W. Allen (H); John Ahlquist | United States | 67 | - | - | 60 | - | - | 394 |

Legend: DNS – Did not start; DSQ – Disqualified; WDR – Withdrew;
