= 1982 Star World Championships =

The 1982 Star World Championships were held in Medemblik, Netherlands in 1982.

== Results ==
Results of individual races
Pos	Crew	Country	I	II	III	IV	V	VI	Pts
Gold medal	Antonio Gorostegui (H); José Doreste	Spain	12	1	13	3	1	3	29.4
Silver medal	Alexander Hagen (H); Vincent Hoesch	West Germany	1	4	7	18	YMP	9	45
Bronze medal	Bill Buchan, Jr. (H); Steve Erickson	United States	3	13	PMS	7	3	7	56.4
4	Jens-Peter Wrede (H); Matthias Borowy	West Germany	4	6	4	28	11	11	61.7
5	Andrew Menkart (H); Steve Calder	United States	5	14	14	5	9	4	63
6	Kees Douze (H); Willem Nagel	Netherlands	16	2	2	14	37	14	68
7	Joachim Griese (H); Jurgen Homeyer	West Germany	14	17	9	8	2	12	70
8	Jens Christensen (H); Morten Nielsen	Denmark	2	15	18	8	18	5	72
9	Peter Wright (H); Todd Cozzens	United States	13	7	3	13	19	-	81.7
10	Colin Bate (H); Phil Baker	Australia	20	12	36	2	4	25	86
11	Jochen Schwarz (H); Ulrich Seeberger	West Germany	9	3	17	16	22	38	93.7
12	Gastão Brun (H); Daniel Wilcox	Brazil	8	11	35	1	-	23	98
13	Ben Staartjes (H); Kobus Vandenberg	Netherlands	24	22	5	11	14	-	105
14	Olle Johansson (H); Dag Hansson	Sweden	30	46	10	15	8	22	115
15	Giorgio Gorla (H); Alfio Peraboni	Italy	21	10	31	YMP	13	-	116.2
16	F. N. De Abreu (H); Christoph Bergmann	Brazil	25	18	20	21	39	2	117
17	Eduardo de Souza (H); Peter Erzberger	Brazil	11	32	16	12	24	26	119
18	Mats Johansson (H); Ingemar Jansson	Sweden	18	26	25	YMP	17	17	126.2
19	Flavio Scala (H); Alberto Rossari	Italy	15	21	41	6	16	-	128.7
20	Fritz Geis (H); Peter Moeckl	West Germany	54	-	1	25	10	19	132
21	Heinz Nixdorf (H); Josef Pieper	West Germany	26	8	17	9	30	29	132
22	Josef Steinmayer (H); Reto Heilig	Switzerland	11	24	22	19	41	28	133
23	Uwe von Below (H); Franz Wehofsich	West Germany	17	5	-	54	28	6	138.7
24	Mogens Nielsen (H); Mogens Pedersen	Denmark	29	31	8	17	25	-	140
25	Hartmut Voigt (H); Gerhard Borowy	West Germany	27	22	30	24	12	32	146
26	Heinz Maurer (H); Peter Keller	Switzerland	23	28	32	34	26	15	154
27	Hans Hylander (H); Olle Albrektson	Sweden	33	52	11	25	35	21	155
28	John Boyce (H); Graham Walker	Great Britain	31	42	12	YMP	47	16	156.2
29	Aldo Mighaccio (H); Donato Pagliarulo	Italy	22	44	6	-	31	26	159.7
30	Hans Wallén (H); Henrik Dubois	Sweden	-	29	26	YMP	42	10	163.7
31	Stefano Roberti (H); Corrado Cristaldini	Italy	7	36	28	37	29	-	167
32	Hubert Raudaschl (H); Karl Ferstl	Austria	6	25	-	4	-	23	167.7
33	Timo Lampen (H); Leif Gallen	Finland	28	50	15	33	21	43	169
34	Bengt Hellsten (H); Bengt Andersson	Sweden	41	35	24	30	-	8	174
35	C. Breitenstein (H); Andreas Giessbrecht	Switzerland	39	34	19	20	38	44	180
36	Barton S. Beek (H); John Maddocks	United States	48	9	40	40	13	-	180
37	Ludwig Buedel (H); Erwin Panip	West Germany	37	45	43	31	13	30	186
38	Ottwtn Semmerow (H); Stephan Wagner	West Germany	32	38	38	38	59	13	189
39	Carl Schröder (H); Lars Edwall	Sweden	40	20	45	22	52	34	191
40	Larry Whipple (H); Foss Miller	United States	19	-	-	10	27	24	192
41	Bruno Marazzi (H); Ueli Keller	Switzerland	50	40	49	39	5	31	193
42	Hans Vogt, Jr. (H); Sten Risom	West Germany	35	41	27	21	40	53	194
43	Stefan Winberg (H); Stefan Sundquist	Sweden	46	43	-	29	33	35	216
44	Stef Scheuregger (H); Bernard Seen	West Germany	56	19	57	55	44	18	222
45	Franco Nazzaro (H); Paolo Nazzaro	Italy	49	33	21	57	50	41	224
46	Walter Passegger (H); Rudolf Fritsch	Austria	36	49	39	YMP	-	43	228.7
47	Peter Scheel (H); Martin Grossmann	Brazil	55	37	-	49	32	33	236
48	Patrick de Barros (H); Coutinho	Portugal	42	16	67	43	-	50	248
49	Gio. Cassinari (H); Pasquale Pelli	Italy	53	54	-	41	34	36	248
50	Jorge Zarif Neto (H); Eduardo Cavagna	Brazil	-	65	29	26	23	-	255
51	Tom Löfstedt (H); Martin Alsen	Sweden	60	30	34	-	20	-	256
52	Sune Carlsson (H); Börje Carlsson	Sweden	43	-	53	36	55	46	260
53	Claus-Peter Luxa (H); Rolf Rottger	West Germany	51	53	56	52	36	40	262
54	William Parks (H); Werner Biebl	United States	62	68	50	23	51	48	264
55	Thomas Olrog (H); Magnus Ahnme	Sweden	57	59	37	35	-	47	265
56	Boudewijn Binkhorst (H); Rob Douze	Netherlands	41	27	-	-	6	-	267.7
57	Rainer Roellenbleg (H); Bruckner	West Germany	63	YMP	46	46	-	39	272.5
58	John Albrechtson (H); Ingvar Hansson	Sweden	38	47	-	-	-	1	273
59	Hannes Gubler (H); Willi Spellbrink	Switzerland	64	-	23	48	56	54	275
60	Arnold Osterwalder (H); Dieter Ertl	Switzerland	45	60	54	52	49	-	290
61	Willy Schlosser (H); Hans Wolter	West Germany	59	57	48	53	-	52	299
62	Sven Karlsson (H); Dennis Harding	Sweden	61	62	64	47	45	55	300
63	Hans-G. Gluende (H); Gert Schulte	West Germany	70	72	44	58	54	49	305
64	Hermann Schwyter (H); Hans-Rudolf Sulzer	Switzerland	66	70	51	42	65	56	310
65	Marcello Adorno (H); Sergio Nascimento	Brazil	-	39	-	32	48	-	313
66	M. Chr. Scheinecker (H); Thomas Richter	Austria	36	-	42	-	43	-	315
67	Rico Gregorini (H); Thomas Moser	Switzerland	65	51	58	YMP	57	-	318.7
68	Harry W. Walker (H); David Munge	United States	-	61	61	59	63	46	320
69	John Hackman (H); Osborne	Great Britain	73	74	65	51	53	51	323
70	Walter Kunzle (H); Manuel Ingold	Switzerland	67	69	55	51	59	-	329
71	Beat Hunziker (H); Vincent Nagelisen	Switzerland	58	58	63	YMP	62	-	331.2
72	Harrison Hine (H); Kenneth Young	United States	-	71	60	44	46	-	333
73	Wolfgang Creutz (H); Horst Barhainski	West Germany	72	63	69	-	60	45	339
74	Gildes Illien (H); Allegret	France	71	55	59	61	64	-	340
75	Albert Sporer (H); Horst Seitz	West Germany	69	67	62	56	61	-	345
76	Hans-G. Ehlers (H); Willi Ross	West Germany	46	58	52	-	-	-	346
77	Thorsten Dmoch (H); Friedtjof Grunkel	West Germany	-	48	-	45	-	-	369
78	Kurt Mueller (H); Rainer Klostermann	Switzerland	-	64	33	-	-	-	373
79	Anders Nordin (H); Patrick Nordin	Sweden	74	73	68	60	-	-	387
80	Ekehart Weinberg (H); Erwin Joras	Netherlands	68	66	66	-	-	-	394
81	Peter D. Siemsen (H); Torben Grael	Brazil	52	-	-	-	-	-	410

Legend: PMS – Premature start; YMP – Yacht materially prejudiced;
