= 1977 Star World Championships =

The 1977 Star World Championships were held in Kiel, Germany in 1977.

== Results ==
Results of individual races
Pos	Crew	Country	I	II	III	IV	V	VI	Tot
Gold medal	Dennis Conner (H); Ron Anderson	United States	11	1	1	1	1	1	435
Silver medal	Sune Carlsson (H); Leif Carlsson	Sweden	1	17	4	2	8	21	408
Bronze medal	Uwe von Below (H); Franz Wehofsich	West Germany	7	3	27	3	7	12	408
4	James M. Schoonmaker (H); Josef Steinmayer	United States	34	4	3	8	5	14	406
5	Valentin Mankin (H); Alexandr Muzychenko	Soviet Union	29	2	19	10	9	3	397
6	Peter Tallberg (H); Mathias Tallberg	Finland	6	21	14	7	3	45	389
7	Mogens Nielsen (H); Mogens Pedersen	Denmark	2	7	24	9	10	32	388
8	Hubert Raudaschl (H); Karl Ferstl	Austria	19	9	10	5	17	17	382
9	Eduardo de Souza (H); Peter Erzberger	Brazil	15	19	7	23	DNF	6	370
10	Hartmut Voigt (H); Hans Juergen Duggen	West Germany	30	10	2	41	13	20	365
11	Uwe Mares (H); Wolf Stadler	West Germany	DNF	6	8	43	18	2	363
12	Calle Pettersson (H); Ulf Carlsson	Sweden	3	5	DSQ	18	11	41	362
13	Barton S. Beek (H); William Munster	United States	8	22	39	11	33	5	361
14	Peter Wyss (H); Gogi Eisold	Switzerland	5	51	12	6	52	15	351
15	Ant. Gorostegui (H); José Benavides	Spain	27	18	22	37	12	13	348
16	Charles Beek (H); Michael Schauffele	United States	-	16	29	19	20	11	345
17	Flavio Scala (H); Mauro Testa	Italy	54	28	43	12	6	8	343
18	James Lippincott (H); Hermann Weiler	United States	20	37	35	15	23	4	343
19	Danielo Folli (H); Alfio Peraboni	Italy	58	41	23	17	15	9	335
20	Paul Louie (H); Chuck Lawson	Canada	23	15	5	47	19	DNF	331
21	Ch. Breitenstein (H); Freddy Schiavo	Switzerland	69	31	13	24	14	29	329
22	Joachim Griese (H); Klaus Schütt	West Germany	71	38	9	21	34	16	322
23	Peter Engler (H); Thomas Koerver	West Germany	76	23	16	22	40	24	315
24	William Parks (H); Herbert Herwig	United States	17	24	57	14	47	25	313
25	Chr. Zernatto (H); Robert Maier	Austria	77	20	21	34	27	27	311
26	Tim Owens (H); Robert Cox	Australia	26	36	11	31	55	26	310
27	Hanz Maurer (H); Reto Heilig	Switzerland	45	39	38	4	37	19	303
28	A. Pascolato (H); Paul Kunze	Brazil	4	35	28	30	42	40	303
29	Josef Urban (H); Jochen Peters	Austria	12	11	47	16	60	63	294
30	Ben Staartjes (H); Peter Moeckli	Netherlands	9	8	41	45	44	46	293
31	Andres Kochanski (H); Tomasz Holc	Poland	33	47	30	38	2	DSQ	290
32	Clifford Norbury (H); Peter Bateman	Great Britain	32	13	42	29	54	37	287
33	Detlef Kuke (H); Christian Koch	West Germany	36	70	33	39	39	10	283
34	Heinz Nixdorf (H); Josef Pieper	West Germany	24	26	75	49	35	23	283
35	Jochen Schwarz (H); Edelbert Schwarz	West Germany	46	14	45	67	22	31	282
36	F. Untersberger (H); Gerd Schulte	West Germany	61	46	48	20	38	7	281
37	Ralph DeLuca (H); Klaus Meissner	United States	50	30	74	33	16	43	268
38	Hans Vogt Sr. (H); Ludwig Buedel	West Germany	65	44	6	72	21	38	266
39	Hans J. Ruedel (H); Michael Esselsgroth	West Germany	51	33	34	27	36	49	261
40	Dierk Thomsen (H); Uli Seeberger	West Germany	57	43	53	25	41	18	260
41	Stefan Winberg (H); Per-Arne Fritjofsson	Sweden	10	57	40	28	46	59	259
42	S. Scheuregger (H); Hans H. Geim	West Germany	14	52	20	60	72	35	259
43	Hannes Schwarz (H); Peter Stinglwagner	West Germany	66	27	31	35	24	69	257
44	Bernd Kuntz (H); Ekkehardt Nusser	West Germany	80	48	15	56	49	22	250
45	Werner Eitle (H); Peter Kullmann	West Germany	16	53	37	52	53	34	248
46	Stefano Ongania (H) de Battista	Italy	37	45	25	59	29	56	248
47	Kurt Sieber (H); Josef Aschenbrenner	West Germany	39	DSQ	17	62	45	33	244
48	Lars Berg (H); Richard Berg	Sweden	43	12	26	59	65	51	243
49	Klaus Kappes (H); Fritz Seeberger	West Germany	60	42	56	26	31	42	243
50	István Telegdy (H); Gyoergy Holovits	Hungary	82	55	69	13	4	65	234
51	Lars Engelbert (H); Olle Carlsson	Sweden	31	40	36	64	64	36	233
52	Russell Bogie (H); Pelle Rappestad	United States	-	34	50	85	56	50	225
53	Kees Douze (H); Boudewyn Binkhorst	Netherlands	70	25	51	40	30	DNF	224
54	James Dobbs (H); Richard Noel Dobbs	Bahamas	48	DSQ	55	48	32	53	204
55	Arnold Winkler (H); Hans Teuscher	Switzerland	44	DNF	70	44	25	55	202
56	A. Osterwalder (H); Theo Toggweiler	Switzerland	35	63	82	36	57	48	201
57	Ed Hengstenberg (H); Heiner Fahnenstich	West Germany	52	68	73	32	28	68	192
58	Carl Petersen (H); James King	United States	38	61	52	74	59	39	191
59	Heinz Risch (H); Karl Stoellinger	Austria	13	50	63	65	63	DNF	186
60	Gerd Schmidt-C. (H); Uwe Claasen	West Germany	42	54	60	61	73	44	179
61	Martin Schwieger (H); Uwe Oelmann	West Germany	40	73	79	54	43	54	176
62	Rene Luedi (H); Karel Rezanka	Switzerland	47	49	85	75	71	28	170
63	Beat Kaiser (H); Roman Faehndrich	Switzerland	53	56	32	41	DSQ	DNF	169
64	Arno Gudrat (H); Manfred Joppich	West Germany	78	67	46	46	48	64	169
65	Fritz Riess (H); Hans Hibler	West Germany	18	69	72	50	66	DNS	165
66	Emilio Caprile (H); Pascual Caprile	Spain	79	65	54	79	26	62	154
67	Max Juchli (H); Peter Goetz	Switzerland	81	72	59	55	50	52	152
68	Ian Woolward (H); Philip Rutledge	Great Britain	62	29	DNF	68	74	57	150
69	Richard Hillmer (H); Rolf Roettger	Netherlands	63	76	44	70	70	47	146
70	Fernando Pombo (H); Manuel Martin-Gamero	Spain	56	75	71	63	75	30	145
71	Sven Karlsson (H); Peder Cederschiöld	Sweden	73	DSQ	18	57	81	66	145
72	Erwin Joras (H); Dieter Freund	Netherlands	59	32	58	84	78	71	142
73	Chris Hoeglung (H); Lars Börjesson	Sweden	22	79	65	53	80	DNF	141
74	Hans Weller (H); Werner Klein	West Germany	49	DSQ	81	58	51	60	141
75	John McKeague (H); Hein Gericke	United States	21	59	67	76	79	DNS	138
76	Gottfried Hatz (H); Walter Schendl	Austria	28	77	62	78	77	58	138
77	Hienz P. Geilen (H); Guenter Kellermann	West Germany	64	DSQ	61	51	68	61	135
78	Wolfgang Creutz (H); Eckart Keitel	West Germany	67	58	78	73	61	70	111
79	Hans Fendt (H); Guenther Schmitz	West Germany	41	1	66	81	76	67	109
80	Philip Warburton (H); Max Tunbridge	Australia	55	74	76	77	58	DNS	100
81	John Ramcke (H); Wulf Kahl	Brazil	83	60	77	66	62	DNF	92
82	Nicholas Bates (H); John Buestad	United States	DNF	64	49	DNF	69	DNS	82
83	Chresten Jensen (H); Harald Jensen	United States	85	78	64	71	67	DNS	75
84	Heinrich Gretler (H); Hanspeter Rossner	Switzerland	74	66	68	80	82	DNF	70
85	Rainer R. Roellenbleg (H); Alfreds Landshammer	West Germany	68	62	83	DNS	DNS	DNS	51
86	E. Alexanderson (H); Linda Roberts	United States	75	71	80	83	84	DNS	47
87	Robert Lamcien (H); Claude Royer	France	84	80	84	82	83	72	39

Legend: DNF – Did not finish; DNS – Did not start; DSQ – Disqualified; WDR – Withdrew;
