= 1980 Star World Championships =

The 1980 Star World Championships were held in Rio de Janeiro, Brazil in 1980.

== Results ==
Results of individual races
Pos	Boat name	Crew	Country	I	II	III	IV	V	VI	Pts
Gold medal	Chewbacca	Tom Blackaller (H); David Shaw	United States	1	2	2	3	5	DNF	21.7
Silver medal	Riky	Albino Fravezzi (H); Oscar Dalvit	Italy	2	1	6	6	2	5	27.7
Bronze medal	Findus	Giorgio Gorla (H); Alfio Peraboni	Italy	8	4	5	9	3	1	37.7
4	Ada Cecilia	Flavio Scala (H); Mauro Testa	Italy	15	5	1	7	1	9	38
5	Blott	Stig Wennerström (H); Lennart Mynsgrat	Sweden	18	9	4	4	8	3	50.7
6	Bucephalus	Alexander Hagen (H); Vincent Hoesch	West Germany	DSQ	3	12	8	9	4	60.7
7	Subbnboana	Eckart Wagner (H); Jorg Moessnang	West Germany	5	13	9	13	4	7	65
8	Eskimo	Valentin Mankin (H); Alexandr Muzychenko	Soviet Union	3	8	7	10	11	17	65.7
9	Wa Wa Too	Gastão Brun (H); Fernando Nabuco	Brazil	14	11	3	19	7	10	71.7
10	Menace	Dennis Conner (H); Ron Anderson	United States	DSQ	10	8	1	34	2	73
11	Suzanne	Barton S. Beek (H); William Munster	United States	6	16	16	2	10	DNF	74.7
12	Krishna VI	Peter Wright (H); Todd Cozzens	United States	20	7	10	5	6	DNF	76.7
13	Krishna V	Eduardo de Souza (H); Peter Erzberger	Brazil	10	6	13	16	14	11	83.7
14	Teko	Antonio Gorostegui (H); Victor Gorostegui	Spain	16	18	15	14	16	6	96.7
15	Ding-Dong	Ben Staartjes (H); Kobus Vandenberg	Netherlands	13	15	18	22	15	12	103
16	Ninotchta I	John King (H); Carlos Gordilho	Brazil	24	12	14	11	13	DNF	104
17	Polly-Ester	Peter Tallberg (H); Mathias Tallberg	Finland	9	23	19	17	17	16	108
18	San	Luca A. Pascolato (H); Jorge Zarif Neto	Brazil	11	26	DSQ	15	20	8	110
19	Mustard Seed	James Allsopp (H); John White	United States	19	19	26	18	12	15	113
20	Mistura Fina	F. Caneppa (H); Geraldo L. Beer	Brazil	17	21	22	DNF	22	18	130
21	Andra El Havso	Peter Sundelin (H); Håkan Lindström	Sweden	7	22	17	27	29	DNF	132
22	Osprey XXI	Erik Schmidt (H); Luiz Amaro	Brazil	22	20	23	21	24	19	135
23	Krishna	Terry Bowman (H); Peter Richter	United States	23	DNF	20	25	19	21	138
24	Humbug XXV	Pelle Petterson (H); Stig Westerdahl	Sweden	DNF	14	11	12	DNF	23	145
25	Ichiban S. Shine	Chris Höglund (H); Lars Börjesson	Sweden	12	35	28	23	27	26	146
26	Expresso	Marcelo Cataner (H); Daniel Wilcox	Brazil	4	17	DSQ	20	DSQ	25	149
27	Yerba Buena	Dierk Thomsen (H); Gert Schulte	West Germany	37	28	21	28	18	24	149
28	Bitu	Axel Schmidt (H); Hans Domschke	Brazil	21	24	DSQ	DSQ	21	13	164
29	Bounty	Harry W. Walker (H); David Perry	United States	27	33	DNF	32	28	20	170
30	Right Here	Peter Meyer (H); Werner Sonksen	Brazil	36	25	32	24	36	27	174
31	All Right II	William Parks (H); Warren B. Cozzens	United States	28	31	30	30	25	33	174
32	Vega III	Tryg Liljestrand (H); Johan Ameln	United States	DSQ	27	25	DNF	30	14	181
33	Clementine	Daniel Adler (H); Camilo Carvalho	Brazil	DNF	DNF	24	26	23	29	187
34	7	Hermann Schwyter (H); Rene Baettic	Switzerland	25	29	35	35	37	DNS	191
35	Carpe Diem	Kurt Mueller (H); Phillipe Warnez	Switzerland	34	32	29	37	44	34	196
36	Cabri	R. Schiaffino (H); G. Patrone	Italy	40	30	DNS	42	33	22	197
37	Kille-Kille	Claus-Peter Luxa (H); R. Sommerfeld	West Germany	35	34	38	33	35	32	199
38	Lutine	Robert Seltzer (H); R. van Wagnen	United States	32	36	31	45	41	31	201
39	Cartola	George Szabo, Jr. (H); Gunther Haack	United States	29	DNF	27	34	31	DNF	206
40	Minhoca	Patrick de Barros (H); P. Halphen	Portugal	30	DNF	40	40	32	37	209
41	Shandry	Gui. Calegari (H); Alberto Zanetti	Argentina	38	40	33	41	42	28	210
42	Catarina	Bernardo Santo (H); Ricardo Salgado	Portugal	33	DNF	36	DNF	26	35	215
43	Vento Sul	George Brothers (H); Klaus Hendriksen	United States	DNS	38	DSQ	29	39	30	221
44	Zwidawurzn	Albert Sporer (H); Fritz Girr	West Germany	39	43	41	43	40	36	229
45	Lorbass	Arno Gudrat (H); Manfred Joppich	West Germany	26	DNF	34	31	DNF	DNF	231
46	Ninotchka II	Kenneth Cole (H); Tom Wysockey	United States	31	42	DNF	38	38	DNF	234
47	Zaperoco III	Thomas D. Drew-Bear (H); Constance Drew-Bear	Venezuela	45	39	39	DSQ	DNF	38	246
48	Brigitte	Reiner Haase (H); Hans G. Beckmann	West Germany	46	DNF	37	36	43	DNF	247
49	Pelikan	Luis F. Bustelo (H); Carlos Duvini	Argentina	44	44	DNF	46	47	39	250
50	Kutuka	Hans Prechter (H); Kurt Seitz	West Germany	41	41	DNF	39	46	DNF	252
51	Sweet Sea	Alberto Meijide (H); Antonio A. Gueri	Argentina	42	45	DNS	47	48	41	253
52	Star Shine	Ovidio Lagos (H); Rodrigo Valverde	Argentina	DNF	37	42	44	DNS	DNS	263
53	Bibi	Hans Fendt (H); Werner Fendt	West Germany	43	DNF	DNS	DNS	45	40	268
54	Zig-Zag IV	Justo L. Frazer (H); Jorge Perez	Argentina	DSQ	DNF	DNS	DNF	DNS	DNS	305

Legend: DNF – Did not finish; DNS – Did not start; DSQ – Disqualified;
