= 1984 Star World Championships =

The 1984 Star World Championships were held in Vilamoura, Portugal in 1984.

== Results ==
Results of individual races
Pos	Boat name	Crew	Country	I	II	III	IV	V	VI	Pts
Gold medal	Findus	Giorgio Gorla (H); Alfio Peraboni	Italy	7	4	11	4	1	33	46
Silver medal		Andrew Menkart (H); James Kavle	United States	3	18	14	1	17	2	51.7
Bronze medal		Paul Cayard (H); Kenneth Keefe	United States	6	1	59	11	4	28	70.7
4		Hans Wallén (H); Torbjörn Hansson	Sweden	21	6	49	9	9	3	74.4
5	Rosa	Olle Johansson (H); Dag Hansen	Sweden	9	5	24	14	8	13	78
6	Tibnorina	Peter Sundelin (H); Roger Nilsson	Sweden	11	21	DSQ	6	5	8	79.7
7	Tine	Hubert Raudaschl (H); Karl Ferstl	Austria	12	7	10	8	15	DNF	62
8		Boudewijn Binkhorst (H); Willem van Walt-Meyer	Netherlands	4	15	9	42	12	17	85
9		Peter Wright (H); Todd Cozzens	United States	14	20	70	5	7	11	86
10	Margot	Kent Carlsson (H); Henrik Eyermann	Sweden	16	11	4	20	10	DNF	89
11	Frolic	Bill Buchan, Jr. (H); Steve Erickson	United States	DSQ	14	1	3	22	31	90.7
12		Jens-Peter Wrede (H); Matthias Borowy	West Germany	31	13	DNF	17	2	6	93.7
13		Alexander Hagen (H); Vincent Hoesch	West Germany	17	12	16	22	23	4	99
14	Romeo	Josef Steinmayer (H); Reto Heilig	Switzerland	42	2	13	15	26	21	102
15	Ribena	David Howlett (H); Tim Tavinor	Great Britain	29	3	18	24	13	38	113.7
16		S. Fleckenstein (H); Robert Nuru	Canada	25	30	66	18	11	7	121
17	Tata	Albino Fravezzi (H); Carlo Bonetti	Italy	10	8	6	19	PMS	50	122.7
18		Tom Löfstedt (H); Martin Alsen	Sweden	43	26	8	45	20	5	131
19	Movie Star	Mats Johansson (H); Bengt Bengtsson	Sweden	22	41	25	30	32	1	133
20	Manatee	Joachim Griese (H); Michael Marcour	West Germany	2	24	28	64	16	39	134
21		Werner Fritz (H); Thomas Buedel	West Germany	30	25	3	27	33	24	135.7
22	Wa-Wa-Too	John King (H); Fernando Nabuco	Brazil	38	33	20	7	35	14	139
23	Sonderjylland	Poul Richard Høj Jensen (H); Theis Palm	Denmark	20	31	7	28	25	DNF	141
24	Spirit	J. A. MacCausland (H); Jay Brown	United States	8	32	45	16	14	DNF	145
25	Krishna	Eduardo de Souza (H); Roberto Martins	Brazil	24	17	37	10	30	DNF	148
26	Ding Dong	Kees Douze (H); Willem Nagel	Netherlands	18	23	23	35	DNF	20	149
27		M. Chr. Scheinecker (H); Hary Mitterdorfer	Austria	32	19	54	63	18	9	162
28	Mina	Gio. Cassinari (H); Oscar Dalvit	Italy	35	16	52	38	21	29	169
29	Simba	Heinz Maurer (H); Chris Rossing	Switzerland	33	44	39	23	34	10	169
30	Blacky	Jochen Schwarz (H); Robert Stark	West Germany	5	57	36	31	37	35	173
31	Ana	Antonio Gorostegui (H); José Doreste	Spain	19	9	62	61	3	56	174.7
32	Fina	Bengt Hellsten (H); S. Westerdahl	Sweden	36	38	73	43	6	30	182.7
33	Cicuta Van Dyke	S. Roberti (H); Mauro Piani	Italy	27	40	72	13	31	42	183
34	Butzi	Rainer Roellenbleg (H); Ulrich Seeberger	West Germany	23	27	51	25	28	52	184
35		Vicente Brun (H); David Shaw	United States	1	22	63	52	24	DNF	185
36		John R. Drew-Bear (H); Christian Flebe	Venezuela	50	36	60	2	29	45	187
37	Liz	Flavio Scala (H); Alberto Rossari	Italy	26	37	55	21	19	DNF	188
38	Moira	Uwe von Below (H); Franz Wehofsich	West Germany	28	43	19	12	57	DNF	189
39		John Boyce (H); David Munge	Great Britain	13	10	65	34	51	DNF	203
40	Noni V	António Correia (H); Henrique Anjos	Portugal	34	39	38	60	46	26	213
41		Carl Schröder (H); Gunther Haack	Sweden	49	52	46	44	38	12	219
42		Börje Larsson (H); Anders Hogland	Sweden	66	47	44	36	43	23	223
43		Ilias Khatzipavlis (H); Leonidas Pelekanakis	Greece	40	28	48	40	39	DNF	225
44	Ali-Baba	Bruno Marazzi (H); Ueli Keller	Switzerland	54	35	21	37	48	63	225
45	Pomeranis	Hartmut Voigt (H); Uwe Heinzmann	West Germany	64	48	29	55	49	16	227
46	Fancea	Fernando Bello (H); Miguel Empis	Portugal	62	67	33	39	44	22	230
47	Ale'ago	Agost. Randazzo (H); Alessandro la Lomia	Italy	63	51	DSQ	26	41	19	230
48	78'Eren	Per Baagoe (H); Peter Brogger	Denmark	48	53	2	65	55	48	231
49	Tomte	C. Breitenstein (H); Andreas Giessbrecht	Switzerland	51	42	31	53	DNF	27	234
50	Duebel XII	Hans-Otto Engel (H); Jurgen Storrers	West Germany	55	DSQ	5	58	47	40	234
51	Trigger Happy IV	Tryg Liljestrand (H); Kim Fletcher	United States	44	49	26	32	56	59	237
52		Charlie Saylan (H); Dan McLaughlin	United States	37	63	40	50	42	41	240
53	Haschen	Reiner Haase (H); Axel Reuter	Netherlands	46	29	50	41	45	60	241
54	Shrew	William Parks (H); David Cornes	United States	67	45	68	47	40	15	244
55	Simone	Ulf Malmborg (H); Tomas Andersson	Sweden	39	59	35	29	61	53	245
56	De Stijl	Vince Locatelli (H); Gianluca Zanotta	Italy	52	56	34	46	50	34	246
57	Buff	Gert Schulte (H); Josef Pieper	West Germany	DSQ	46	17	59	36	58	246
58		Hans Hylander (H); Olle Albrektson	Sweden	47	50	42	54	60	32	255
59	Minhoca	Jorge Pinheiro (H); Felipe V. da Rocha	Portugal	41	YMP	32	51	PMS	57	256.3
60	Tifosa di Pasta	Rico Gregorini (H); Rolf Zeltner	Switzerland	45	54	DSQ	49	63	24	266
61		Daniel Adler (H); Camilo Carvalho	Brazil	56	34	69	62	27	DNF	278
62	Lion Rampant	Ian Woolward (H); John Maddocks	United States	15	DNF	41	33	DNS	DNS	279
63		Ric. Simoneschi (H); Mauro Delbecchi	Italy	60	58	15	75	DNF	43	281
64	Boccadoro	Paolo Nazzaro (H); Franco Nazzaro	Italy	71	DSQ	64	57	53	18	293
65	Miage	Patrice Ratzel (H); Francois Seguin	France	57	66	12	74	DNS	54	293
66	Olga	Johan Freye (H); Peter Koch	Sweden	72	70	22	48	64	61	295
67	Eshmschaugo	Manfred Meyer (H); Peter Kullmann	West Germany	53	55	53	56	58	62	305
68		Willem Derokson (H); Jan Krom	Netherlands	69	60	30	68	52	DNF	309
69	Mops	Jochen Diercks (H); Herbert Brassch	West Germany	73	61	43	71	59	46	310
70	P. Fantastic	Dierk Thomsen (H); Andreas Gerlach	West Germany	65	62	58	66	62	36	313
71	Lisa	Jouka Lindgren (H); Jari Järvimaa	Finland	61	69	47	72	70	37	314
72	Bibi	Hans Fendt (H); Werner Fendt	West Germany	76	68	27	76	65	49	315
73	Riki	Gui. Calegari (H); Ovidio Lagos	Argentina	58	64	DSQ	73	54	47	326
74	Rhumba	Bernardo Silva (H); Jorge Goncalves	Portugal	68	71	57	70	66	51	342
75		Harry W. Walker (H); Axel Schultz	United States	74	73	61	DNS	67	44	349
76	Bla-Bla	Fritz Girr (H); Karl Schneider	West Germany	70	65	56	67	68	DNF	356
77	7	Hermann Schwyter (H); Francesco Rossi	Switzerland	59	72	67	69	69	DNS	366
78	Egli	Klaus Muller (H); Beiko Muller	West Germany	75	74	74	77	71	55	379
79	Indolence	Sandra Bottini (H); Cat Dabrsasi	Italy	77	DNF	71	DNS	DNS	DNS	418

Legend: DNF – Did not finish; DNS – Did not start; DSQ – Disqualified; PMS – Premature start; YMP – Yacht materially prejudiced;
