= 1978 Star World Championships =

International one-design racing keelboat regatta

The 1978 Star World Championships were held in San Francisco, United States in 1978.

== Results ==
Results of individual races
Pos	Crew	Country	I	II	III	IV	V	VI	Pts
Gold medal	Buddy Melges (H); Andreas Josenhans	United States	1	1	1	3	4	DNS	13.7
Silver medal	Dennis Conner (H); Ron Anderson	United States	2	2	2	8	10	9	38
Bronze medal	Tom Blackaller (H); Ed Bennett	United States	4	10	DSQ	14	2	3	52.7
4	William Gerard (H); Paul Cayard	United States	7	24	4	12	7	2	55
5	James M. Schoonmaker (H); Kim Fletcher	United States	11	12	17	1	1	28	58
6	Peter Wright (H); Todd Cozzens	United States	5	6	12	10	9	8	66.7
7	Eckart Wagner (H); Peter Moeckl	West Germany	10	22	3	5	11	16	70.7
8	Paul Henderson (H); Bruce Brymer	Canada	17	26	5	20	8	1	73
9	John Dane III (H); Frederick May	United States	16	13	7	2	20	35	83
10	Bill Buchan, Jr. (H); Douglas Knight	United States	WDR	3	53	4	3	6	90.1
11	Eduardo de Souza (H); Peter Erzberger	Brazil	-	21	DSQ	17	14	4	97.5
12	Stig Wennerström (H); Lennart Roslund	Sweden	13	8	51	6	32	12	100.7
13	Thomas Lundquist (H); Lars Engelbert	Sweden	9	9	10	19	39	24	101
14	Sune Carlsson (H); Leif Carlsson	Sweden	14	16	13	22	37	7	102
15	Allan Leibel (H); David Shaw	Canada	8	27	9	27	5	25	103
16	Paul Louie (H); Les Shaw	Canada	DNF	32	6	11	16	13	107.7
17	Pelle Petterson (H); Stellan Westerdahl	Sweden	24	15	22	18	DNS	11	120
18	Boudewijn Binkhorst (H); Piet Aafjes	Netherlands	DNF	4	18	7	40	26	123
19	Don Trask (H); William Kreysler	United States	3	11	39	40	43	5	123.7
20	Mogens Nielsen (H); Mogens Pedersen	Denmark	6	20	DSQ	25	45	10	135.7
21	William Parks (H); Alan Leehner	United States	19	29	16	DSQ	23	29	146
22	Tryg Liljestrand (H); Carl Blomquist	United States	27	41	40	28	12	14	151
23	Malin Burnham (H); Robbie Haines	United States	23	34	15	30	21	DNF	151
24	Ian Elliot (H); Mark Brink	United States	DSQ	30	30	13	22	34	159
25	Stephen G. Gould (H); Christopher Gould	United States	DNF	35	8	60	6	23	160.7
26	Ian MacDonald-S. (H); Michael Baker-Harber	Great Britain	26	7	25	64	33	40	161
27	Larry Whipple (H); James Alexander	United States	38	17	36	23	17	DNF	161
28	Peter Sundelin (H); Håkan Lindström	Sweden	25	25	24	36	25	42	165
29	Kirk Reynolds (H); Michael Huber	United States	22	33	28	32	64	21	166
30	Lars-Erik Molse (H); Bernt Ekström	Sweden	DNF	23	35	35	28	18	169
31	Jeff Madrigali (H); John Mann	United States	12	45	58	46	26	15	174
32	Peter Holds (H); Thomas Anderson	Australia	15	42	34	26	46	33	180
33	Chas. Corbishley (H); Paul Nolan	United States	20	39	21	34	DNF	37	181
34	Hartmut Voigt (H); Hans-Juergen Duggen	West Germany	31	28	38	29	34	30	182
35	James Allsopp (H); Barton S. Beek	United States	DNF	WDR	14	9	18	19	196
36	James Dobbs (H); Craig Symonette	Bahamas	DNF	56	19	52	15	32	204
37	Heinz Nixdorf (H); Josef Pieper	West Germany	36	51	23	39	29	DNS	208
38	Uwe von Below (H); Franz Wehofsich	West Germany	DNF	18	11	DNF	38	17	220
39	Dierk Thomsen (H); Christian Prey	West Germany	21	14	55	69	56	51	227
40	Ben Staartjes (H); Kobus Vandenberg	Netherlands	DSQ	40	DSQ	16	19	22	233
41	Uwe Mares (H); Wolf Stadler	West Germany	DNF	5	20	15	59	DNS	234
42	Flavio Scala (H); Testa Mauro	Italy	28	*	DNF	38	51	49	236.3
43	Fritz Riess (H); Josef Steinmayer	Austria	33	80	56	41	31	48	237
44	Hans H. Domschke (H); Jorg C. Stegman	Brazil	48	37	52	48	36	44	243
45	Gary MacDonald (H); David Winkler	United States	40	DNF	64	33	35	46	248
46	Yan Rogers (H); Tog Rogers	United States	34	64	43	DNF	51	41	263
47	Stef Scheuregger (H); Wolfgang Schneider	West Germany	44	54	46	53	52	39	264
48	Göran Tell (H); Börje Larsson	Sweden	DSQ	DNF	26	43	24	38	267
49	Larry Shorett (H); David Nielsen	United States	DNF	36	27	24	DNF	45	268
50	Thomas S. Meric (H); Kyle Smith	United States	DNS	31	32	57	30	DNS	286
51	Hans Prechter (H); Ulrich Rattenhuber	West Germany	49	66	48	58	47	54	286
52	Arno Gudrat (H); Manfred Joppich	West Germany	30	62	69	72	50	47	288
53	Arnold Osterwalder (H); Theo Toggweiler	Switzerland	37	60	49	70	DNS	43	289
54	J. M. MacCausland (H); George Szabo, Jr.	United States	47	70	41	47	54	DNS	289
55	Sven Karlsson (H); Peder Cederschiöld	Sweden	29	38	54	81	DNS	58	290
56	Ian Woolward (H); Philip Rutledge	Great Britain	35	68	44	66	57	DNF	300
57	Thomas Norrman (H); Peter Schulz	Sweden	59	55	57	56	48	DNF	305
58	John Jenkins (H); Theodore Petterson	United States	50	46	59	65	70	56	306
59	William Kieser (H); Craig Collins	United States	45	71	60	55	66	55	311
60	Wulf Kahl (H); Hermann Hedinger	West Germany	43	57	77	68	63	52	313
61	Gary Schlegel (H); Charles Lawson	Canada	52	53	45	73	60	DNF	313
62	David Gaillard (H); William John Levedahl	United States	32	75	67	71	62	53	315
63	Ulf Blencke (H); Lars Andersson	Sweden	DNF	DSQ	42	21	DNF	20	325
64	George Thomas (H); Donald Harris	United States	46	58	33	54	DNS	DNS	327
65	Durward Knowles (H); Michael Russell	Bahamas	8	WDR	DNF	37	DNS	31	328
66	Daniel Adler (H); Marceilo C. Adorno	Brazil	51	DNF	37	62	42	DNS	328
67	William Campbell (H); Arthur W. Silcox	United States	DNF	43	47	42	60	DNS	328
68	William Cowles (H); Ross F. Wood	United States	57	59	76	80	65	50	337
69	Giorgio Gorla (H); Alessandro la Lomia	Italy	DNF	DNS	DSQ	59	13	27	341
70	Ricardo Didier (H); Manfred Kaufmann	Brazil	54	47	62	74	74	DNS	341
71	Eugene McCarthy (H); Glenn McCarthy	United States	DSQ	52	71	44	41	DNF	344
72	Steve Jepperen (H); Kenneth Keefe	United States	DSQ	48	DNF	85	44	36	349
73	Peter U. Wyss (H); Bruno Muller	Switzerland	DNF	19	29	63	DNS	DNS	353
74	Hans J. Ruedel (H); Michael Esselgroth	West Germany	DNF	44	31	79	71	DNS	361
75	Jochen Schwarz (H); Dennis Watts	West Germany	55	63	70	78	*	DNS	362.5
76	Neil McConaghy (H); Chris Holden	United States	DNF	49	DNF	45	27	DNF	363
77	Rainer Roellenbleg	West Germany	41	50	DSQ	76	67	DNF	270
78	Rudolf Lange (H); Heinz Mitterhauser	Austria	DNS	72	61	86	72	57	378
79	Detlef Kuke (H); Udo Winands	West Germany	42	65	68	67	DNF	DNS	378
80	Jack Lynch (H); Duncan Skinner	United States	39	WDR	DSQ	31	68	DNF	380
81	Victor Thausing (H); Sepp Nostlinger	Austria	60	77	63	50	DNS	DNS	386
82	John McGann (H); Fred Simmons	United States	63	84	78	88	76	59	390
83	Timothy A. Owens (H); Robert Cox	Australia	DNF	DSQ	50	49	55	DNF	396
84	Klaus Kappes (H); Peter Ledosquet	Switzerland	56	61	65	82	DNS	DNS	400
85	E. F. Aitkinson (H); Mark Svenson	United States	62	83	DSQ	87	78	60	400
86	Mario Innecco	Brazil	53	67	DNF	DSQ	58	DSQ	420
87	Sven Rhyheden (H); Håkan Berntsson	Sweden	58	73	DSQ	51	DNF	DNF	424
88	Edgar Purins (H); Sigurd Purins	Australia	61	81	74	83	DNS	DNF	435
89	Ralph F. DeLuca (H); Julle Lewicki	United States	DNF	76	72	*	73	DNF	438.8
90	Stefano Ongania (H); Giovanni Vaisecchi	Italy	DNF	DNS	67	61	75	DNF	445
91	Lloyd Bush (H); Dave McCalley	United States	DNF	78	DSQ	77	49	DNS	446
92	Erwin Joras (H); Dieter Freund	Netherlands	DNF	69	DNF	75	69	DNS	455
93	Franz von Gagern (H); Gunther Frieracher	Austria	DSQ	79	75	84	DSQ	DNS	480
94	Manfred Meyer (H); Gunther Haack	West Germany	DNF	82	73	DNF	DNS	DNS	503
95	Stef Schermerhorn (H); Susan Schermerhorn	United States	DNF	85	DNS	DNS	77	DNF	510
96	Thomas D. Drew-Bear (H); Mark Hurlbut	Venezuela	DNF	74	DNF	89	DNS	DNS	511
97	Daniel J. Clark (H); Michael de Paemeiare	United States	DNF	DNS	79	90	DNS	DNS	517
98	Horst Loos (H); Georg Beck	West Germany	DNF	DNS	DNS	DNS	DNS	DAS	560
99	Heinz Maurer (H); Heinrich Scherer	Switzerland	DNF	DNS	DNS	DNS	DNS	DNS	560

Legend: DNF – Did not finish; DNS – Did not start; DSQ – Disqualified; WDR – Withdrew;
