= 1987 Star World Championships =

The 1987 Star World Championships were held in Chicago, United States in 1987.

== Results ==
Results of individual races
| Pos | Crew | Country | I | II | III | IV | V | VI | Pts |
|---|---|---|---|---|---|---|---|---|---|
| Gold medal | Ed Adams (H); Tom Olsen | United States | 3 | 10 | 1 | 12 | 1 | 23 | 39.7 |
| Silver medal | Alexander Hagen (H); Fritz Girr | West Germany | 2 | 7 | 4 | 4 | 4 | WDR | 40 |
| Bronze medal | Paul Cayard (H); Steve Erickson | United States | 6 | 1 | 2 | 9 | 17 | 21 | 52.7 |
| 4 | Ross MacDonald (H); Bruce MacDonald | Canada | 5 | 2 | 37 | 1 | 13 | 24 | 62 |
| 5 | Terry McLaughlin (H); Evert Bastet | Canada | 19 | 11 | 33 | 3 | 3 | 8 | 64.4 |
| 6 | Mats Johansson (H); Torbjörn Hansson | Sweden | 4 | 6 | 28 | 8 | 27 | 2 | 69.7 |
| 7 | Peter Wright (H); Todd Cozzens | United States | 15 | 4 | 52 | 11 | 12 | 4 | 72 |
| 8 | Joachim Hellmich (H); Dirk Schwaertzel | West Germany | 10 | 16 | 48 | 2 | 2 | 28 | 78 |
| 9 | Colin Beashel (H); S. Leonard | Australia | 11 | 5 | 9 | 31 | 14 | 15 | 83 |
| 10 | Mark Reynolds (H); Hal Haenel | United States | 1 | 9 | 19 | 15 | 37 | 18 | 85 |
| 11 | Gastão Brun (H); Carlos McCourtney | Brazil | 22 | 3 | 25 | 5 | 20 | 33 | 100.7 |
| 12 | Giorgio Gorla (H); Alfio Peraboni | Italy | 12 | 17 | 14 | 6 | 22 | 22 | 100.7 |
| 13 | J. A. MacCausland (H); Robert MacCausland | United States | 7 | 28 | 10 | 28 | 33 | 5 | 107 |
| 14 | Joe Londrigan (H); M. Busch | United States | 25 | 12 | 12 | 70 | 15 | 13 | 107 |
| 15 | John W. Allen (H); Arthur W. Silcox | United States | 20 | 24 | 16 | 34 | 36 | 1 | 118 |
| 16 | Uwe von Below (H); Franz Wehofsich | West Germany | 9 | 11 | 47 | 33 | 23 | 14 | 120 |
| 17 | Roberto Ferrarese (H); Carlo Girone | Italy | 16 | 27 | 15 | 20 | DNS | 12 | 120 |
| 18 | Hans Vogt, Jr. (H); Ulrich Seeberger | West Germany | 17 | 14 | 21 | 23 | 21 | WDR | 126 |
| 19 | T. Herrmann (H); Rick Hennig | United States | 30 | 32 | 24 | WDR | 11 | 6 | 132.7 |
| 20 | Ingvar Bengtson (H); Peter Klock | Sweden | 18 | DSQ | 34 | 16 | 38 | 3 | 135.7 |
| 21 | Albino Fravezzi (H); L. Bontempelli | Italy | 29 | 13 | 7 | 30 | 30 | 34 | 139 |
| 22 | Auge Diaz (H); Marshall Duane | United States | 21 | 23 | 29 | 32 | 16 | 27 | 146 |
| 23 | Steven Bakker (H); Kobus Vandenberg | Netherlands | 14 | 30 | 23 | 14 | 47 | 38 | 149 |
| 24 | Roberto Benamati (H); Giuseppe Devoti | Italy | 24 | 20 | 3 | WDR | 29 | 47 | 149.7 |
| 25 | Peter Sundelin (H); Stephan Kallin | Sweden | 26 | 41 | 18 | 25 | 32 | 19 | 150 |
| 26 | Ian Woolward (H); J. Maddocks | United States | 33 | 37 | 36 | DNS | 5 | 10 | 150 |
| 27 | Terry Bowman (H); Rob Maine III | United States | 51 | 45 | 20 | 43 | 8 | 7 | 153 |
| 28 | Jorge Zarif Neto (H); Peter Erzberger | Brazil | 39 | DSQ | 6 | 19 | 19 | 42 | 154.7 |
| 29 | Allan Leibel (H); Witold Gesing | Canada | 48 | 33 | 39 | 35 | 7 | 17 | 161 |
| 30 | Alberto Zanetti (H); J. Lavandeira | Argentina | 13 | 34 | 31 | 45 | 9 | 50 | 162 |
| 31 | Thomas Oljelund (H); Christian Olsson | Sweden | 27 | 29 | 30 | 13 | 34 | 35 | 163 |
| 32 | Ted Hovey (H); Neil Foley | United States | 42 | 18 | 17 | 27 | 50 | 31 | 165 |
| 33 | Hub. Merkelbach (H); Walter Oess | West Germany | 23 | 22 | 43 | 17 | 31 | 45 | 166 |
| 34 | Michael Clements (H); RobertBurton | Canada | 34 | 36 | 8 | 29 | 66 | 32 | 169 |
| 35 | Josef Pieper (H); U. Reinhold | Austria | 56 | 62 | 13 | 24 | 6 | 43 | 171.7 |
| 36 | T. Nute (H); C. Hartshorn | United States | 44 | 42 | 11 | 42 | 25 | 29 | 179 |
| 37 | Werner Fritz (H); D. Stadler | West Germany | 31 | 52 | 5 | 26 | 40 | WDR | 183 |
| 38 | Peter Gale (H); Ernie Lawrence | Australia | 38 | 25 | 26 | 21 | 48 | DNS | 188 |
| 39 | I. Walker (H); W. Jobnson | Australia | 28 | 54 | 38 | 39 | 42 | 11 | 188 |
| 40 | Peter Scheel (H); J. C. da Silva Jordao | Brazil | 45 | DSQ | 27 | 37 | 39 | 16 | 194 |
| 41 | M. Chr. Scheinecker (H); Christian Holler | Austria | 47 | 26 | 22 | 36 | 41 | DNS | 202 |
| 42 | Andy Ivey (H); Reid Krakower | United States | 36 | 43 | 54 | 22 | 43 | 37 | 211 |
| 43 | M. van Leeuwen (H); P. Vollebregt | Netherlands | 35 | DSQ | 42 | 40 | 61 | 20 | 228 |
| 44 | S. Ulian (H); B. Murphy | United States | 46 | 35 | 46 | 18 | 54 | 55 | 229 |
| 45 | Foss Miller (H); J. Turvey | United States | 40 | 60 | 60 | 44 | 10 | 46 | 230 |
| 46 | Vicente Brun (H); Hugo Schreiner | United States | 8 | DSQ | 32 | 10 | WDR | DNS | 238 |
| 47 | S. P. Mykkänen (H); J. Ljungquist | Finland | 52 | 44 | 51 | 38 | DNS | 26 | 241 |
| 48 | Bill Buchan, Jr. (H); C. Thomas | United States | 32 | 15 | WDR | 7 | WDR | DNS | 242 |
| 49 | E. Peters, Jr. (H); E. Peters, Sr. | United States | 43 | 41 | 64 | 54 | 28 | 40 | 246 |
| 50 | R. Van Wagnen (H); J. Hunger | United States | 55 | 39 | 65 | 46 | 44 | 36 | 250 |
| 51 | Joan Watts (H); Alan Drew IV | United States | 41 | DSQ | 35 | 57 | 46 | DNS | 253.8 |
| 52 | J. Dollahite (H); S. Dietrich | United States | 59 | 38 | 57 | 55 | 52 | 25 | 257 |
| 53 | Rainer Roellenbleg (H); Robert Stark | West Germany | 37 | 31 | 45 | DNS | 35 | DNS | 257 |
| 54 | G. Cole (H); M. Thomas | United States | 69 | 46 | 67 | 52 | 55 | 9 | 259 |
| 55 | Richard Stearns (H); E. Armstrong | United States | 54 | 19 | 59 | 47 | 64 | 59 | 268 |
| 56 | R. Wilbur (H); R. Wilbur | United States | 49 | 47 | 63 | 49 | 58 | 41 | 274 |
| 57 | J. Lovell (H); M. Jones | United States | 67 | 66 | 70 | 64 | 26 | 30 | 283 |
| 58 | W. G. Watson (H); K. Flood | United States | 57 | 40 | 56 | DNS | 60 | 44 | 287 |
| 59 | Gio. Fenaroli (H); A. Fenini | Italy | 50 | DSQ | 44 | 53 | 59 | 57 | 293 |
| 60 | D. Wesselhoft (H); D. Wesselhoft | United States | 58 | 56 | 40 | 65 | 73 | 48 | 297 |
| 61 | T. P. Hagy, Jr. (H); H. Jonas | United States | 64 | DSQ | 41 | 66 | 49 | 54 | 304 |
| 62 | Steve Kling (H); E. Hillenbrand | United States | 72 | 49 | 50 | 48 | 71 | 58 | 308 |
| 63 | John Foster, Sr. (H); John Foster, Jr. | U.S. Virgin Islands | 66 | DSQ | 55 | 56 | 62 | 39 | 308 |
| 64 | William Parks (H); R. Russell | United States | 53 | 61 | WDR | 41 | 45 | WDR | 309 |
| 65 | Ben Staartjes (H); Rob Douze | Netherlands | 61 | DSQ | 49 | DNF | 18 | DNS | 316 |
| 66 | Harry W. Walker (H); Todd C. Raynor | United States | 65 | 50 | 68 | 58 | 63 | 52 | 318 |
| 67 | D. Parfet (H); B. Vandenberg | United States | 68 | DSQ | 58 | 51 | 51 | 60 | 318 |
| 68 | Peter E. Siemsen (H); Norman MacPherson | Brazil | 60 | 21 | DNF | DSQ | 53 | DNS | 322 |
| 69 | D. Jaros (H); D. Burgett | United States | 70 | 55 | 53 | 60 | 57 | DNS | 325 |
| 70 | O. Schmid (H); D. Cornes | West Germany | 73 | DSQ | 62 | 59 | 56 | 49 | 329 |
| 71 | R. Beigel (H); L. Martin | Portugal | 71 | DSQ | DSQ | 50 | 24 | DNS | 333 |
| 72 | Mario Caprile (H); Guido Sodano | Spain | 63 | 59 | 71 | 62 | 68 | 61 | 343 |
| 73 | George Brothers (H); N. Miller | United States | 75 | DSQ | 61 | 63 | 69 | 51 | 349 |
| 74 | R. Poole (H); P. Poole | United States | 78 | 58 | 74 | 68 | 72 | 53 | 355 |
| 75 | J. Vanderhoff (H); F. Molali | United States | 76 | 57 | 66 | 61 | 70 | DNS | 360 |
| 76 | Michael C. Hicks (H); Patrick W. Hicks | Great Britain | 62 | 53 | WDR | DNF | 65 | DNS | 368 |
| 77 | P. Kresge (H); D. Kresge | United States | 79 | 65 | 72 | WDR | 67 | 56 | 369 |
| 78 | S. Turvey (H); P. Kennedy | United States | 74 | 63 | 73 | 67 | 75 | DNS | 382 |
| 79 | T. Ramoser (H); S Ramoser | West Germany | 77 | 64 | 69 | 69 | 74 | DNS | 383 |

Legend: DNF – Did not finish; DNS – Did not start; DSQ – Disqualified; WDR – Withdrew; YMP – Yacht materially prejudiced;
