= 1981 Star World Championships =

The 1981 Star World Championships were held in Marblehead, United States in 1981. It was the first time since Pim von Huetschler in the 40th that non American sailors won the prestigious Worlds Title. It was Alexander Hagen and Vincent Hösch from Germany that rocked the Star Class in the early 80th with Laser like downwind technics and light body weight. They were struggling upwind because of minor crew weight. They managed to reach the 1st mark in 10th position but were "flying" on the reach to call for room at the jibing mark into 1st position. They were rocking the boat and pumping sails like sitting on a Laser to extend their lead. Then it was easy to defend the lead from the front despite their poor upwind speed. 2 Years later rocking and pumping was forbidden by the IYRU-Racing Rules. 16 Years later Alex Hagen won the Star Worlds again in Marblehead. This time Marcelo Ferreira (the crew of Torben Grael) was crewing.

== Results ==
Results of individual races
Pos	Crew	Country	I	II	III	IV	V	VI	Pts
Gold medal	Alexander Hagen (H); Vincent Hösch	West Germany	1	7	5	3	5	6	37.4
Silver medal	Peter Wright (H); Todd Cozzens	United States	7	4	1	DSQ	10	2	40
Bronze medal	Bill Buchan Jr. (H); Ron Anderson	United States	2	3	12	11	20	3	49.4
4	Tom Blackaller (H); David Shaw	United States	3	23	3	6	13	4	50.1
5	Boudewijn Binkhorst (H); Rob Douze	Netherlands	5	5	4	24	DSQ	10	74
6	Andrew Menkart (H); Steve Calder	United States	DNS	13	9	5	26	1	76
7	Giorgio Gorla (H); Alfio Peraboni	Italy	4	6	34	2	16	26	76.7
8	Uwe von Below (H); Wolf Sellig	West Germany	16	32	25	4	12	7	92
9	Albino Fravezzi (H); Oscar Dalvit	Italy	23	8	6	DSQ	14	13	93.7
10	Stig Wennerström (H); Sture Christensson	Sweden	27	2	33	15	17	9	95
11	John Dane III (H); Frederick May	United States	8	41	19	19	1	33	103
12	Vicente Brun (H); Hugo Schreiner	United States	10	9	16	7	DSQ	39	111
13	Joachim Griese (H); Jurgen Homeyer	West Germany	14	29	60	9	2	34	113
14	Jochen Schwarz (H); Ulrich Seeberger	West Germany	11	31	8	30	15	45	125
15	Peter O'Donnell (H); Richard Coxon	Australia	28	10	22	26	DNF	11	127
16	Tryg Liljestrand (H); Bengt Andersson	United States	21	39	13	1	43	40	137
17	Barton S. Beek (H); William Munster	United States	12	24	11	12	DSQ	48	137
18	Buddy Melges (H); Andreas Josenhans	United States	22	49	2	DNF	7	32	137
19	John Boyce (H); Pete Milliken	Great Britain	31	30	10	DSQ	4	37	140
20	Aldo Migliaccio (H); Donato Pagliarulo	Italy	39	45	32	14	8	20	143
21	Stefan Winberg (H); Stefan Sundquist	Sweden	13	43	17	DNF	3	41	143.7
22	Eduardo Farre (H); Alberto Zanetti	Argentina	56	11	23	61	9	15	144
23	John King (H); Marcus Temke	Brazil	34	18	14	25	24	36	145
24	Colin Bate (H); Phil Smidmone	Australia	DNS	20	15	25	18	50	153
25	Heinz Nixdorf (H); Josef Pieper	West Germany	18	68	18	28	44	22	160
26	Peter Scheel (H); Camilo Carvalho	Brazil	19	21	7	40	DSQ	43	160
27	Hans Wallén (H); Henrik Dubois	Sweden	15	1	DSQ	8	DSQ	29	161
28	Ch. Corbishley (H); Doug Weatherby	United States	47	44	20	13	45	12	164
29	Harry W. Walker (H); David Perry	United States	57	16	28	59	19	18	168
30	Mats Johansson (H); Ingemar Jansson	Sweden	37	22	21	53	25	35	170
31	Joe Zambella (H); Leo Dawson	United States	6	33	40	46	21	64	175.7
32	Gastão Brun (H); Steven Bakker	Brazil	29	82	52	10	27	28	176
33	Paul Riley Jr. (H); Bill Butz Jr.	United States	50	26	53	36	11	23	176
34	Mark Reynolds (H); Ed Trevelyan	United States	9	75	DNF	27	6	30	176.7
35	Rob Maine III (H); Terry Bowman	United States	38	25	37	34	DSQ	14	178
36	William Parks (H); Greg Cook	United States	26	17	DNF	43	42	24	182
37	William Gerard (H); Billy Matson	United States	55	53	43	32	21	5	183
38	Alex Smigelski (H); Chuck Tripp	United States	20	27	48	22	36	DNF	183
39	William Allen (H); Bill Kinell	United States	17	12	44	DNF	34	49	186
40	Shawn Killeen (H); Conrad Kuebel	United States	43	35	36	21	33	DNS	198
41	J. M. MacCausland (H); J. A. MacCausland	United States	32	37	DSQ	42	32	25	198
42	Ian Ford (H); Geoffery Davidson	Australia	45	62	41	39	28	16	199
43	Rainer Roellenbleg (H); Deter Wuerdig	West Germany	35	64	30	33	60	21	209
44	Stephen G. Gould (H); John Mann	United States	24	15	DSQ	29	DSQ	54	237
45	George Thomas (H); Donald Harris	United States	33	42	50	47	38	DNF	240
46	Ben Staartjes (H); Kobus Vandenberg	Netherlands	25	46	DSQ	18	DSQ	38	242
47	Patrick de Barros (H); Manuel Ricciardi	Portugal	53	36	35	53	35	DNF	242
48	Steve Andrews (H); John Raymont	United States	46	72	27	37	DSQ	31	243
49	Dave McCalley (H); Mike Barney	United States	42	59	38	54	23	61	246
50	Knight Coolidge (H); Dale Hoffman	United States	DNF	65	26	38	DNF	8	252
51	Peter Costa (H); David O'Brien	United States	36	58	45	16	DSQ	69	254
52	Bob Westcott (H); John McMaus	United States	51	66	68	56	31	27	261
53	P. Migliaccio (H); Antonio Bottini	Italy	64	19	54	44	DSQ	52	263
54	Arnold Osterwalder (H); Juergen Maly	Switzerland	44	48	47	DSQ	51	44	264
55	T. Lippincott (H); Dick Martin	United States	40	51	63	DNF	39	42	265
56	S. Prinsenberg (H); D. Prinsenberg	Canada	41	56	39	41	DSQ	58	265
57	Chuck Lamphere (H); Robert Lamphere	United States	49	14	70	35	DSQ	72	270
58	Justo L. Frazer (H); Hector Longarela	Argentina	30	50	49	57	DSQ	55	271
59	Dierk Thomsen (H); Wulf Mehner	West Germany	52	40	46	49	DSQ	59	276
60	Peter D. Siemsen (H); Torben Grael	Brazil	DSQ	47	DSQ	23	29	63	277
61	Dave Cook (H); Robert Cook	United States	54	54	51	50	47	65	286
62	Robert Seltzer (H); Charles Hurlbut	United States	48	55	42	64	52	62	289
63	Thompson Adams (H); William Richard	United States	DNF	52	59	17	DSQ	47	290
64	Andy Ivey (H); Jim Nichol	United States	61	77	61	69	54	19	294
65	John Grether (H); Tracy Usher	United States	62	63	57	31	DSQ	51	294
66	Jack Button (H); John Button	United States	DNF	38	31	68	57	71	295
67	Gary MacDonald (H); David Winkler	United States	58	28	DNF	51	DSQ	46	298
68	David Robinson (H); John Robinson	United States	DNF	73	65	65	50	17	300
69	John Hackman (H); Don Alexander	Great Britain	63	71	58	63	30	57	301
70	Frank Zagarino (H); Frank Egger	United States	DNF	34	29	45	DNF	DNS	308
71	William Kieser (H); Hans Bucher	United States	66	78	69	55	40	53	313
72	William Farrar (H); John Sibander	United States	DNF	69	24	61	55	75	314
73	Thorsten Cook (H); Mark Dolan	United States	DNF	67	67	48	41	66	319
74	David Gaillard (H); Jack Levendahl	United States	59	79	55	71	49	56	320
75	Dave Ivey (H); Jon Blom	United States	DNF	57	72	67	53	67	346
76	Werner Holtze (H); Regina Holtze	United States	67	76	56	66	58	70	347
77	F. N. De Abreu (H); Galba Filho	Brazil	60	60	DSQ	DSQ	37	DNF	357
78	Thomas D. Drew-Bear (H); Robert Franza	Venezuela	65	61	64	70	DSQ	68	358
79	Hilary Smart (H); John Huntsman	United States	68	70	DNS	58	DSQ	60	371
80	At Atkinson (H); Thor Kieser	United States	69	DSQ	71	73	56	73	372
81	John R. McGann (H); John C. McGann	United States	70	74	66	74	DNF	74	388
82	Steve Kling (H); Rolf Zeisler	United States	71	80	DNF	75	59	76	391
83	Luis F. Bustelo (H); Santiago González	Argentina	DNF	84	DNS	72	48	DNF	404
84	Gerry Cayne (H); Dick Atkinson	United States	DNF	81	62	62	DSQ	DNF	405

Legend: DNF – Did not finish; DNS – Did not start; DSQ – Disqualified;
