= Sailing at the 1980 Summer Olympics – Star =

Sailing at the Olympics

Star at the Games of the XXII Olympiad
- Star
- Venue: Tallinn
- Dates: 21 to 29 July
- Competitors: 28 from 13 nations
- Teams: 13

Medalists
| 1st place, gold medalist(s) | | Valentin Mankin; Aleksandr Muzychenko | Soviet Union |
| 2nd place, silver medalist(s) | | Hubert Raudaschl; Karl Ferstl | Austria |
| 3rd place, bronze medalist(s) | | Giorgio Gorla; Alfio Peraboni | Italy |

The Star was a sailing event on the Sailing at the 1980 Summer Olympics program in Tallinn, USSR. Seven races were scheduled. 28 sailors, on 13 boats, from 13 nations competed.

== Results ==
| Rank | Helmsman (Country) | Crew | Race I | | Race II | | Race III | | Race IV | | Race V | | Race VI | | Race VII | | Total Points | Total -1 |
| Rank | Helmsman (Country) | Crew | Rank | Points | Rank | Points | Rank | Points | Rank | Points | Rank | Points | Rank | Points | Rank | Points | Total Points | Total -1 |
|---|---|---|---|---|---|---|---|---|---|---|---|---|---|---|---|---|---|---|
| 1st place, gold medalist(s) | Valentin Mankin (URS) | Aleksandr Muzychenko | 2 | 3.0 | 1 | 0.0 | 1 | 0.0 | 5 | 10.0 | 1 | 0.0 | 6 | 11.7 | ~~7~~ | ~~13.0~~ | 37.7 | 24.7 |
| 2nd place, silver medalist(s) | Hubert Raudaschl (AUT) | Karl Ferstl | 1 | 0.0 | 4 | 8.0 | ~~DSQ~~ | ~~20.0~~ | 3 | 5.7 | 2 | 3.0 | 1 | 0.0 | 9 | 15.0 | 51.7 | 31.7 |
| 3rd place, bronze medalist(s) | Giorgio Gorla (ITA) | Alfio Peraboni | 3 | 5.7 | 3 | 5.7 | 3 | 5.7 | 4 | 8.0 | 4 | 8.0 | 2 | 3.0 | ~~6~~ | ~~11.7~~ | 47.8 | 36.1 |
| 4 | Peter Sundelin (SWE) | Håkan Lindström | 6 | 11.7 | 5 | 10.0 | 5 | 10.0 | 1 | 0.0 | 5 | 10.0 | ~~7~~ | ~~13.0~~ | 2 | 3.0 | 57.7 | 44.7 |
| 5 | Jens Christensen (DEN) | Morten Nielsen | 4 | 8.0 | 7 | 13.0 | ~~12~~ | ~~18.0~~ | 2 | 3.0 | 6 | 11.7 | 5 | 10.0 | 1 | 0.0 | 63.7 | 45.7 |
| 6 | Boudewijn Binkhorst (NED) | Kobus Vandenberg | 10 | 16.0 | 2 | 3.0 | 2 | 3.0 | ~~11~~ | ~~17.0~~ | 3 | 5.7 | 3 | 5.7 | 10 | 16.0 | 66.4 | 49.4 |
| 7 | Antonio Gorostegui (ESP) | José Benavides | 7 | 13.0 | 8 | 14.0 | 7 | 13.0 | 6 | 11.7 | 7 | 13.0 | 4 | 8.0 | ~~12~~ | ~~18.0~~ | 90.7 | 72.7 |
| 8 | Wolf-Eberhard Richter (GDR) | Olaf Engelhardt, Bernd Jäkel | 8 | 14.0 | ~~13~~ | ~~19.0~~ | 6 | 11.7 | 13 | 19.0 | 10 | 16.0 | 9 | 15.0 | 4 | 8.0 | 102.7 | 83.7 |
| 9 | Eduardo de Souza Ramos (BRA) | Peter Erzberger | 9 | 15.0 | ~~11~~ | ~~17.0~~ | 8 | 14.0 | 8 | 14.0 | 9 | 15.0 | 11 | 17.0 | 5 | 10.0 | 102.0 | 85.0 |
| 10 | György Holovits (HUN) | Tamás Holovits | 5 | 10.0 | ~~12~~ | ~~18.0~~ | 9 | 15.0 | 7 | 13.0 | 12 | 18.0 | 8 | 14.0 | 11 | 17.0 | 105.0 | 87.0 |
| 11 | Peter Tallberg (FIN) | Mathias Tallberg | ~~12~~ | ~~18.0~~ | 6 | 11.7 | 4 | 8.0 | 12 | 18.0 | 11 | 17.0 | 10 | 16.0 | 13 | 19.0 | 107.7 | 88.7 |
| 12 | Tomasz Holc (POL) | Zbigniew Malicki | 11 | 17.0 | 10 | 16.0 | 10 | 16.0 | 9 | 15.0 | ~~DNF~~ | ~~20.0~~ | DNF | 20.0 | 3 | 5.7 | 109.7 | 89.7 |
| 13 | Jean-Claude Vuithier Sr. (SUI) | Heinz Maurer, Jean-Philippe L'Huillier | 13 | 19.0 | 9 | 15.0 | 11 | 17.0 | 10 | 16.0 | 8 | 14.0 | ~~DSQ~~ | ~~20.0~~ | 8 | 14.0 | 115.0 | 95.0 |

DNF = Did not finish, DNS= Did not start, DSQ = Disqualified, PMS = Premature start, YMP = Yacht materially prejudiced
= Male, = Female

=== Daily standings ===
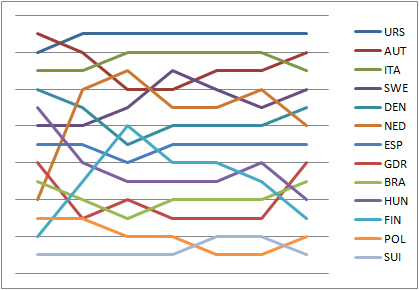
Graph showing the daily standings in the Star during the 1980 Summer Olympics
