= Sailing at the 1984 Summer Olympics – Star =

Sailing at the Olympics

Star at the Games of the XXIII Olympiad
- Star
- Venue: Long Beach
- Dates: 31 July to 8 August
- Competitors: 38 from 19 nations
- Teams: 19

Medalists
1st place, gold medalist(s)		William E. Buchan; Steven Erickson	United States
2nd place, silver medalist(s)		Joachim Griese; Michael Marcour	West Germany
3rd place, bronze medalist(s)		Giorgio Gorla; Alfio Peraboni	Italy

The Star was a sailing event on the Sailing at the 1984 Summer Olympics program in Long Beach, Los Angeles County, California. Seven races were scheduled. 38 sailors, on 19 boats, from 19 nations competed.

== Results ==
Rank	Helmsman (Country)	Crew	Race I		Race II		Race III		Race IV		Race V		Race VI		Race VII		Total Points	Total -1
Rank	Helmsman (Country)	Crew	Rank	Points	Rank	Points	Rank	Points	Rank	Points	Rank	Points	Rank	Points	Rank	Points	Total Points	Total -1
1st place, gold medalist(s)	William Earl Buchan (USA)	Steven Erickson	1	0.0	9	15.0	~~RET~~	~~26.0~~	2	3.0	6	11.7	1	0.0	1	0.0	55.7	29.7
2nd place, silver medalist(s)	Joachim Griese (FRG)	Michael Marcour	~~PMS~~	~~26.0~~	4	8.0	4	8.0	6	11.7	1	0.0	4	8.0	3	5.7	67.4	41.4
3rd place, bronze medalist(s)	Giorgio Gorla (ITA)	Alfio Peraboni	3	5.7	6	11.7	3	5.7	~~7~~	~~13.0~~	3	5.7	2	3.0	6	11.7	56.5	43.5
4	Kent Carlson (SWE)	Henrik Eyermann	4	8.0	2	3.0	2	3.0	4	8.0	~~8~~	~~14.0~~	6	11.7	5	10.0	57.7	43.7
5	Hubert Raudaschl (AUT)	Karl Ferstl	6	11.7	~~13~~	~~19.0~~	1	0.0	11	17.0	10	16.0	3	5.7	2	3.0	72.4	53.4
6	Ilias Hatzipavlis (GRE)	Leonidas Pelekanakis	2	3.0	1	0.0	11	17.0	~~13~~	~~19.0~~	11	17.0	10	16.0	8	14.0	86.0	67.0
7	Antonio Gorostegui (ESP)	José Luis Doreste	8	14.0	~~14~~	~~20.0~~	10	16.0	5	10.0	4	8.0	7	13.0	7	13.0	94.0	74.0
8	Boudewijn Binkhorst (NED)	Willem van Walt Meijer	~~RET~~	~~26.0~~	7	13.0	YMP	19.0	1	0.0	2	3.0	DSQ	26.0	9	15.0	102.0	76.0
9	Iain Woolward (GBR)	John Maddocks	5	10.0	12	18.0	8	14.0	~~17~~	~~23.0~~	12	18.0	5	10.0	4	8.0	101.0	78.0
10	Steven Kelly (BAH)	Montague Higgs	11	17.0	~~16~~	~~22.0~~	6	11.7	3	5.7	7	13.0	11	17.0	11	17.0	103.4	81.4
11	Colin Beashel (AUS)	Richard Coxon	~~RET~~	~~26.0~~	3	5.7	5	10.0	12	18.0	9	15.0	8	14.0	~~13~~	~~19.0~~	107.7	81.7
12	Eduardo Ramos (BRA)	Roberto Souza	9	15.0	8	14.0	7	13.0	9	15.0	5	10.0	9	15.0	~~12~~	~~18.0~~	100.0	82.0
13	Lawrence Lemieux (CAN)	Witold Gesing	7	13.0	5	10.0	14	20.0	8	14.0	13	19.0	~~DNF~~	~~26.0~~	10	16.0	118.0	92.0
14	Josef Steinmayer (SUI)	Reto Heilig	10	16.0	~~15~~	~~21.0~~	9	15.0	10	16.0	15	21.0	12	18.0	14	20.0	127.0	106.0
15	John Drew-Bear (VEN)	Christian Flebbe	12	18.0	10	16.0	12	18.0	14	20.0	17	23.0	13	19.0	~~DNF~~	~~26.0~~	140.0	114.0
16	Rodrigo Zuazola (CHI)	Carlos Rossi	15	21.0	11	17.0	13	19.0	16	22.0	~~19~~	~~25.0~~	17	23.0	18	24.0	151.0	126.0
17	António Correia (POR)	Henrique Anjos	13	19.0	~~19~~	~~25.0~~	15	21.0	18	24.0	14	20.0	16	22.0	16	22.0	153.0	128.0
18	John F. Foster Sr. (ISV)	John Foster Jr.	14	20.0	17	23.0	~~RET~~	~~26.0~~	15	21.0	16	22.0	15	21.0	17	23.0	156.0	130.0
19	Howard Palmer (BAR)	Bruce Bayley	16	22.0	18	24.0	16	22.0	~~PMS~~	~~26.0~~	18	24.0	14	20.0	15	21.0	159.0	133.0

DNF = Did not finish, DNS= Did not start, DSQ = Disqualified, PMS = Premature start, YMP = Yacht materially prejudiced
= Male, = Female

=== Daily standings ===
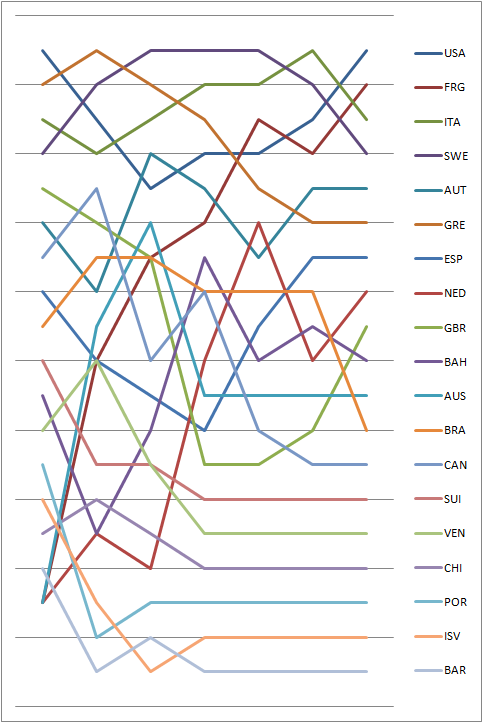
Graph showing the daily standings in the Star during the 1984 Summer Olympics

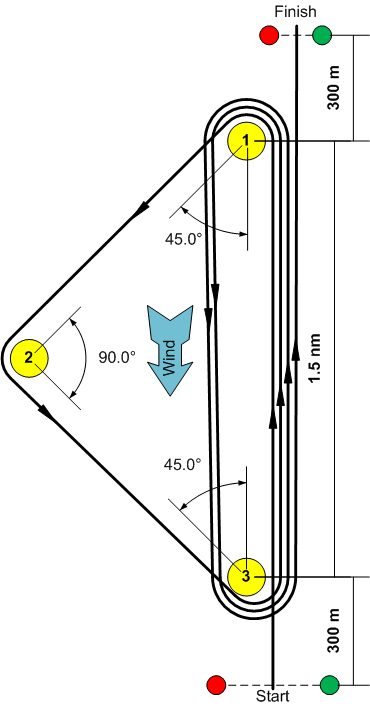
Star Course Map
