= L'Huillier =

L'Huillier may refer to:

- Anne L'Huillier (born 1958), French physicist
- Jean-Philippe L'Huillier (born 1951), Swiss sailor
- Peter L'Huillier (1926–2007), scholar of canon law and archbishop of the Orthodox Church in America
- Simon Antoine Jean L'Huilier (or L'Huillier) (1750–1840), Swiss mathematician
- Fort L'Huillier (sometimes spelled Le Hillier), a short-lived fortification in New France
