= Wolf-Eberhard Richter =

German sailor

Personal information
- Nationality: German
- Born: 5 June 1953 (age 71); Berlin, Germany

Sport
- Sport: Sailing

Wolf-Eberhard Richter (born 5 June 1953) is a German sailor. He competed in the Star event at the 1980 Summer Olympics.
