= John Drew-Bear =

Venezuelan sailor (born 1955)

John Drew-Bear (born 8 June 1955) is a Venezuelan Olympic Star class sailor. He participated in the 1984 Summer Olympics together with Christian Flebbe, where they finished 15th.
