= Arne Karlsson (sailor) =

Swedish sailor

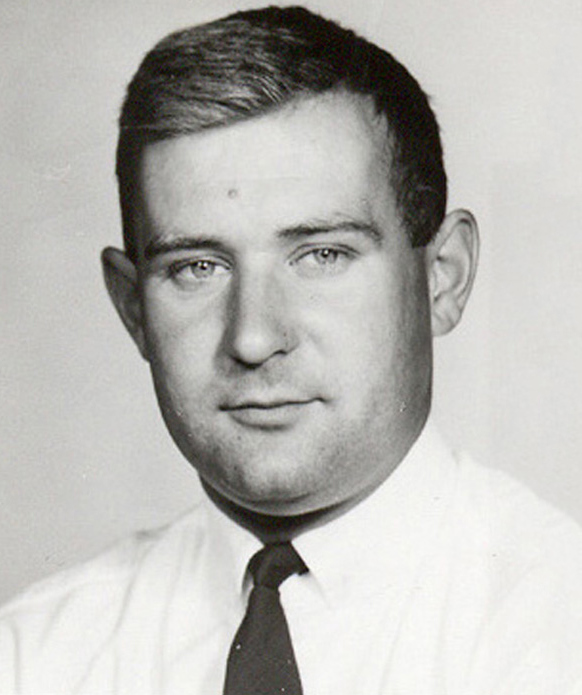

Personal information
- Born: 23 March 1936 (age 90) Örebro, Sweden
- Height: 174 cm (5 ft 9 in)
- Weight: 76 kg (168 lb)

Sailing career
- Sport: Sailing
- Club: Royal Swedish Yacht Club
Medal record
Representing Sweden
Olympic Games
| Silver medal – second place | 1964 Tokyo | 5.5 m class |

Ernst Arne Karlsson (born 23 March 1936) is a retired Swedish sailor. He was a crew member of the Swedish boat Rush VII that won the silver medal in the 5.5 m class at the 1964 Summer Olympics. His father Hjalmar and younger brother Per-Olof were also Olympic sailors.
