= Tamás Holovits =

Hungarian sailor (1950–2023)

Personal information
- Nationality: Hungarian
- Born: 14 December 1950; Balatonföldvár, Hungary
- Died: 13 February 2023 (aged 72)

Sport
- Sport: Sailing

Tamás Holovits (14 December 1950 – 13 February 2023) was a Hungarian sailor. He competed in the Star event at the 1980 Summer Olympics.
