= Zbigniew Malicki =

Polish sailor (1944–2022)

Personal information
- Nationality: Polish
- Born: 9 September 1944; Minden, Germany
- Died: 12 August 2022 (aged 77)

Sport
- Sport: Sailing

Zbigniew Malicki (9 September 1944 – 12 August 2022) was a Polish sailor. He competed in the Star event at the 1980 Summer Olympics.
