= Bruce Bayley =

Barbadian sailor (born 1961)

Personal information
- Born: 6 November 1961 (age 63); Bridgetown, Barbados

Sport
- Sport: Sailing

Bruce Francis Herbert Bayley (born 6 November 1961) is a Barbadian sailor. He competed in the Star event at the 1984 Summer Olympics.
