= Per-Olof Karlsson =

Swedish sailor (born 1942)

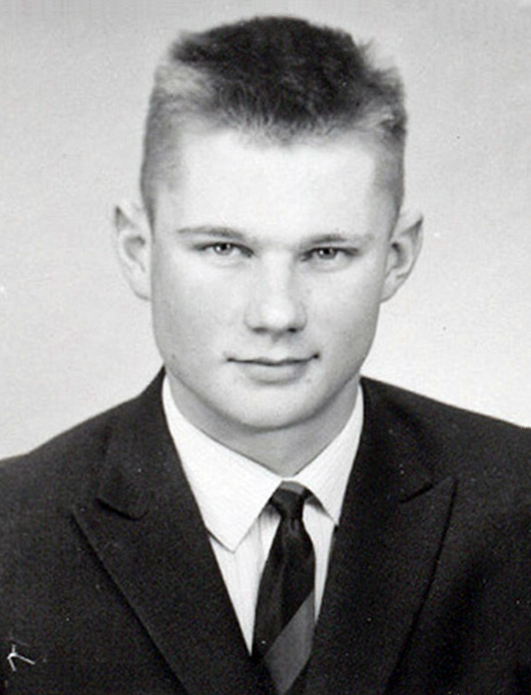

Personal information
- Born: 19 February 1942 (age 84) Örebro, Sweden
- Height: 182 cm (6 ft 0 in)
- Weight: 78 kg (172 lb)

Sailing career
- Sport: Sailing
- Club: Rastaflottiljen, Stockholm

Per-Olof Karlsson (born 19 February 1942) is a retired Swedish sailor. He competed in the star class at the 1960 Summer Olympics and finished 10th, together with Sune Carlsson. His father Hjalmar and elder brother Arne were also Olympic sailors.
