= John Maddocks =

British sailor

Personal information
- Full name: John Henry Maddocks
- Nationality: British
- Born: 7 January 1958 (age 67); Reading, England

Sailing career
- Class: Star

John Henry Maddocks (born 7 January 1958) is a British sailor. He competed in the Star event at the 1984 Summer Olympics together with Iain Woolward and finished 9th.

Maddocks was born in Reading.
