= Andreas Wengert =

Brazilian sailor (born 1944)

Personal information
- Nationality: Brazilian
- Born: 20 November 1944 (age 80); Brazil
- Height: 1.80 m (5.9 ft)

Sailing career
- Class: Soling
- Updated on 27 February 2020

Andreas Wengert (born 20 November 1944 in Peilstein, Austria) is a naturalized Brazilian sailor, who represented Brazil at the 1976 Summer Olympics in Kingston, Ontario, Canada as crew member in the Soling. With helmsman Gastão Brun and fellow crew member Vicente Brun, they took the 10th place.

== Sources ==
- "Andreas Wengert Bio, Stats, and Results". Olympic Sports. Sports-Reference.com. Archived from the original on 18 July 2014.
