= Carlos Rossi (sailor) =

Chilean sailor

Personal information
- Nationality: Chilean
- Born: 25 October 1955 (age 69)

Sport
- Sport: Sailing

Carlos Rossi (born 25 October 1955) is a Chilean sailor. He competed in the Star event at the 1984 Summer Olympics.
