= Hjalmar Karlsson =

Swedish sailor (1906–1992)

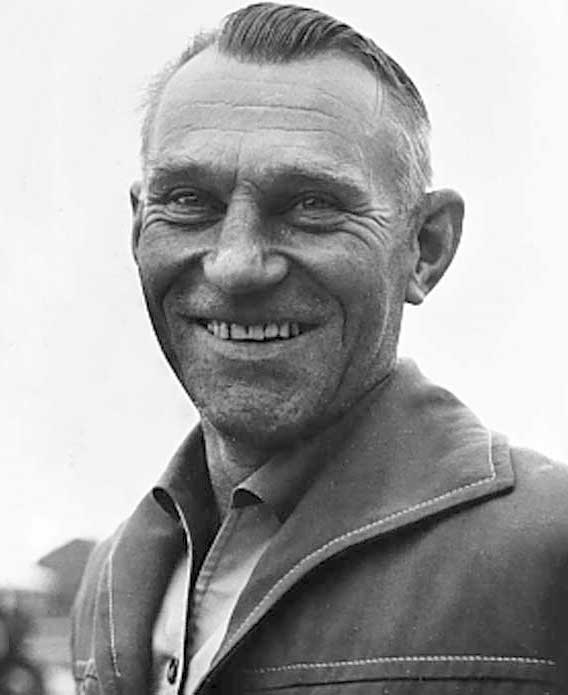

Personal information
- Born: 1 March 1906 Örebro, Sweden
- Died: 2 April 1992 (aged 86) Ekerö, Stockholm, Sweden

Sailing career
- Sport: Sailing
- Club: Royal Swedish Yacht Club
- Class: 5.5 Metre
Medal record
Sailing
Representing Sweden
Olympic Games
Gold medal – first place	1956 Melbourne	5.5 m class

Ernst Hjalmar Karlsson (1 March 1906 – 2 April 1992) was a Swedish sailor. He was a crew member of the Swedish boat Rush V that won the gold medal in the 5.5 m class at the 1956 Summer Olympics. His sons Arne and Per-Olof also became Olympic sailors.
