= Christian Flebbe =

Venezuelan sailor

Personal information
- Nationality: Venezuelan
- Born: 22 March 1960 (age 64)

Sport
- Sport: Sailing

Christian Flebbe (born 22 March 1960) is a Venezuelan sailor. He competed in the Star event at the 1984 Summer Olympics.
