= Ian Elliot =

Scottish artist

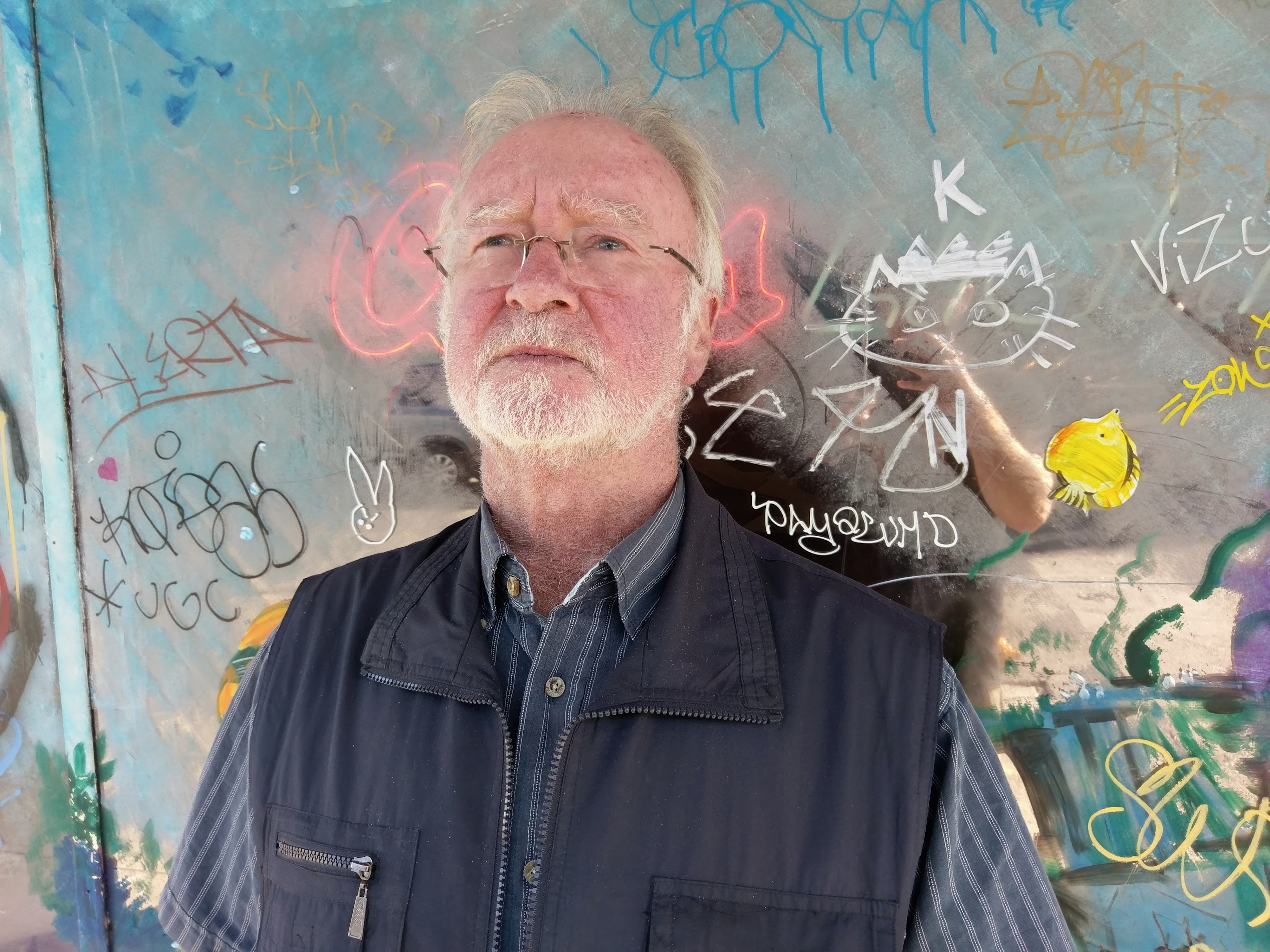
- Ian Elliot, Olympia, WA, Sep 2018
- Born: Ian Scott Elliot; August 12, 1946; Glasgow, Scotland
- Died: July 3, 2021 (aged 75)
- Education: Glasgow School of Art DA (GSA), Jordanhill College (Education)
- Known for: Painting, drawing
- Notable work: Calvia (2002); Morning Mist, Ayrshire (2011); Rendezvous, Mallorca (2013); Ian Elliot, Self portrait (2020)
- Website: ianelliot.com

Ian Elliot (12 August 1946 – 3 July 2021) was a modern Scottish artist known for abstract expressionist painting.

== Early life ==
Ian Scott Elliot was born on August 12, 1946, in Glasgow, Scotland. He attended the Glasgow School of Art (GSA) from 1964 to 1968. After graduating from GSA he attended Jordanhill College for teacher training 1969-1969. He worked as the Head of Art & Design in King's Park Secondary School for 16 years. He left teaching 1997 to focus on the development of his artistic career.

== Artistic career ==
Inspired by travel throughout his homeland of Scotland, Italy, France, and the island of Mallorca, Ian Elliot’s oil on canvas artwork is known for incorporating the vibrant colors of the Mediterranean with modern impressionist style

The Glasgow born artist’s distinct style and vivid colour palette is largely inspired by his Mediterranean travels.

— Scotland Art

In 2002 A Place in the Sun (British TV series) followed Ian Elliot as he travelled from Scotland to Calvià Mallorca and broadcast him painting "Calvia" - oil on canvass in January 2003. A long-standing artist member of the Paisley Art Insitiute, he was a finalist in the 2003 International Artist magazine global landscape competition. From 2012, Ian Elliot’s name was listed in the Morven Press’s ‘Who’s Who In Art. In 2013, International Artist magazine featured Ian Elliot in a ten page in-depth article illustrating his working process on the painting Rendezvous, Mallorca. And in 2016 was featured in Pratique des Arts n° 135. He exhibited at solo and joint exhibitions throughout his career.

A colorist at heart, Ian Elliot’s work conveys the warm atmosphere of the Mediterranean.

— Pratique des Arts

== Gallery ==
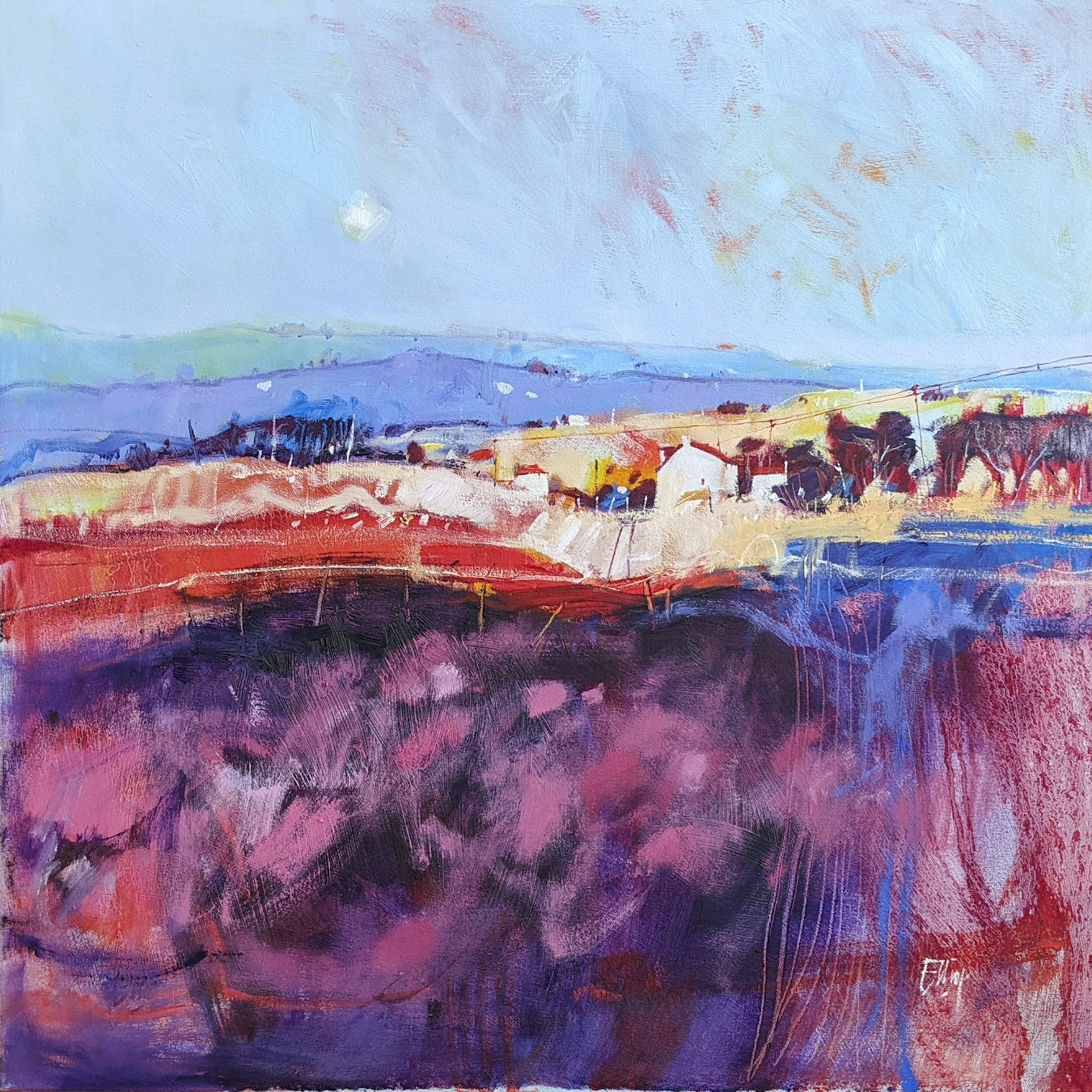
Morning Mist, Ayrshire (2011) – Ian Elliot

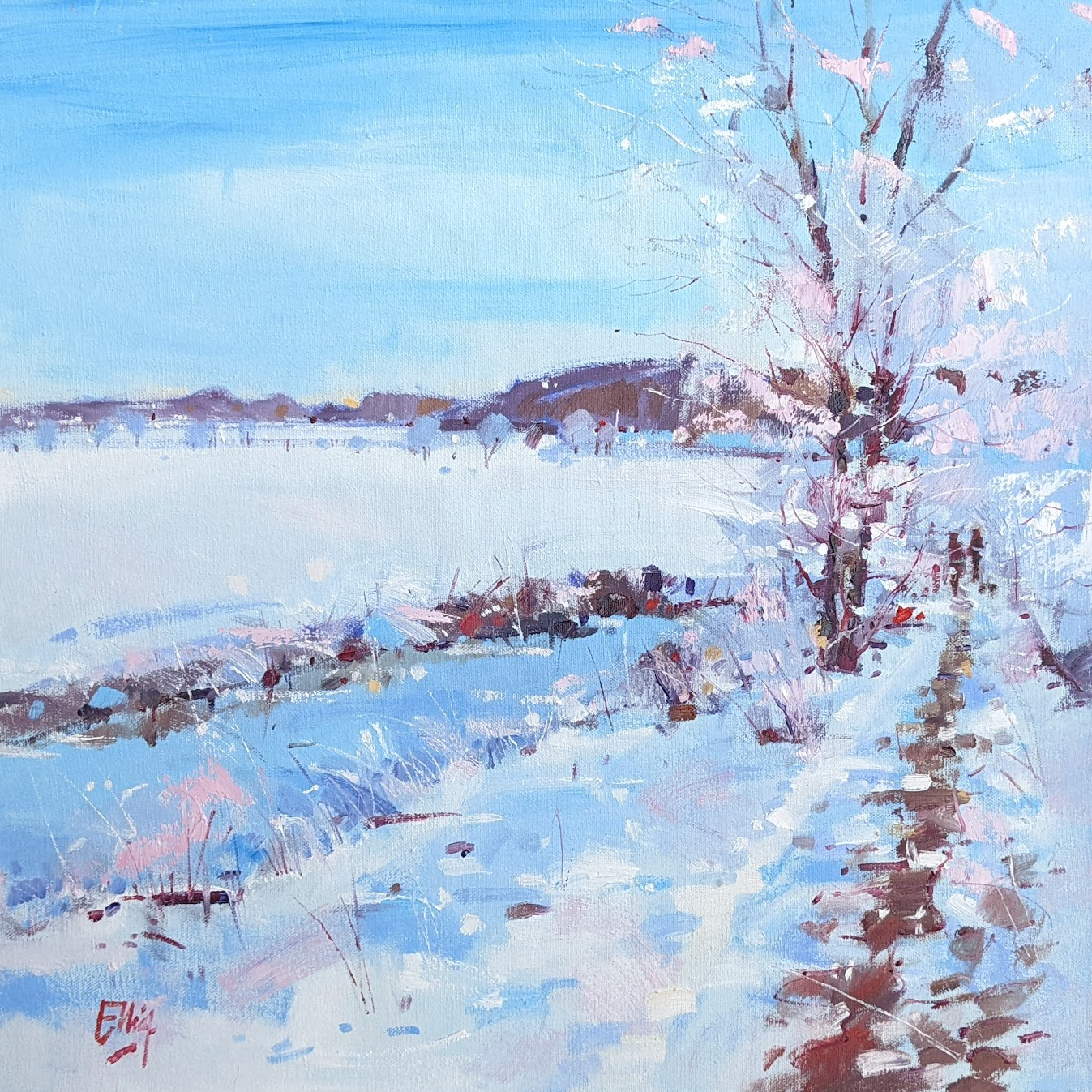
Stroll by the riverbank, Pollok Park (2011) – Ian Elliot

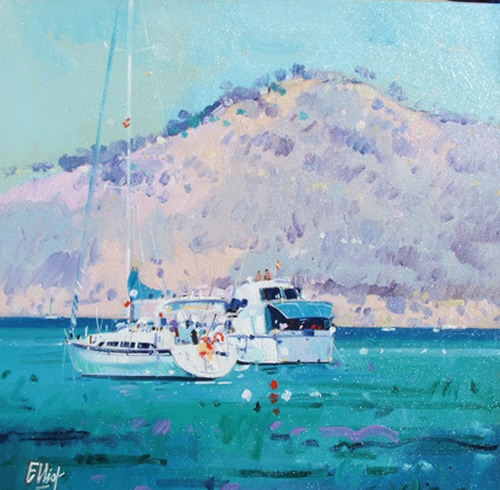
Rendezvous, Mallorca (2013) – Ian Elliot

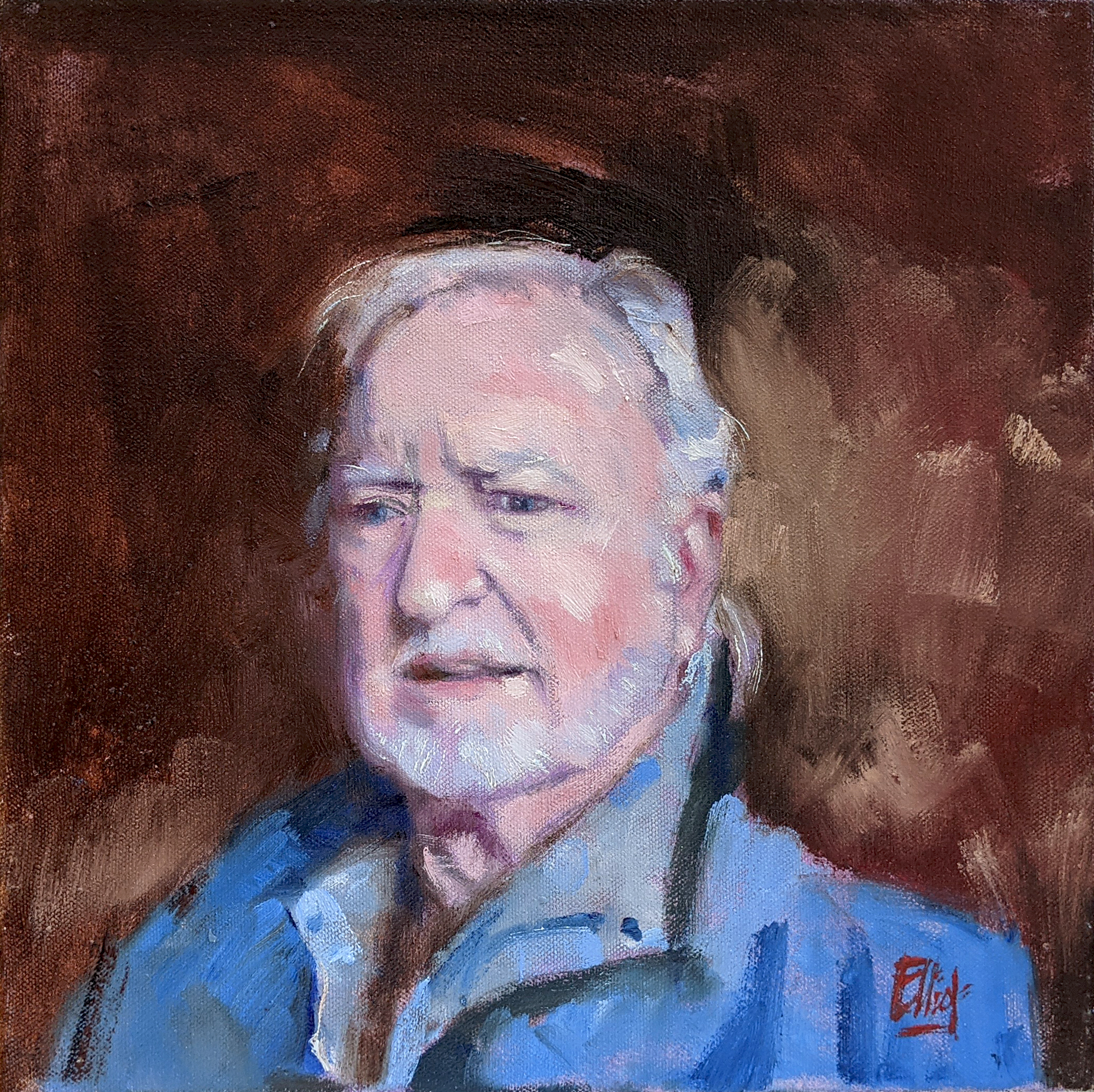
Self portrait (2020) – Ian Scott Elliot

== Exhibitions ==
=== Solo ===
- 2008, 2012, 2014: Ian Elliot, The Gatehouse gallery
- 2016: Ian Elliot, Ian Elliot solo show (Printed flyer). Art Connection Gallery. 2016.
- 2021: Ian Elliot, Scotland Art
- Framework gallery, Troon
- Rowan gallery, Helensburgh
- Torquhoun gallery, Tarves

=== Group ===
- 2013: Ian Elliot, George Birrell, Davy Brown and James Orr (Printed flyer). Devorgilla Gallery. 2013.
- 2016: Tis the Season!, Scotland Art
- 2017: Summer Breeze, Thistle Gallery: Contemporary Scottish Art
- 2017: Elliot, McWhinnie, Elliot, McWhinnie (Printed flyer). Thistle Gallery. 2017.
- 2018: Turning over a New Leaf, Thistle Gallery: Contemporary Scottish Art
- 2018: Elliot, McWhinnie, Elliot, McWhinnie (Printed flyer). Thistle Gallery. 2018.
- 2019: Winter exhibition, Thistle Gallery: Contemporary Scottish Art
- 2020, 2021: Winter exhibition, Scotland Art

== Print ==
- 2002: Different strokes, Glasgow South & Eastwood Extra
- 2004: World-wide fame, Glasgow Times
- 2007: Med in Scotland, The Scotsman
- 2008: Market-ing his art, Glasgow South & Eastwood Extra
- 2013: Travel Opens the Eyes… and the Mind – 10 page feature, International Artist magazine
- 2016: July (UK edition), Vogue (magazine)
- 2017: 4 page feature 2017, Pratique des Arts n° 135
