= Witold Gesing =

Canadian sailor

Personal information
- Nationality: Canadian
- Born: 4 May 1949 (age 77) Kraków, Poland

Sport
- Sport: Sailing

Witold Gesing (born 4 May 1949) is a Canadian sailor. He competed in the Star event at the 1984 Summer Olympics.
