= Roberto Souza =

Brazilian sailor

Roberto Luiz Souza (born September 7, 1951) is a Brazilian former Olympic sailor in the Soling and Star classes. He competed in Soling in the 1980 Summer Olympics together with Gastão Brun and Vicente Brun, where they finished 6th, and in Star in the 1984 Summer Olympics together with Eduardo de Souza, where they finished 12th.
