= István Telegdy =

Hungarian sailor

István Telegdy (4 December 1927 – 11 November 2013) was a Hungarian Olympian sailor and trainer. His nickname was "Ketyi".

== Early life ==
Telegdy was born on 4 December 1927 in Budapest, Hungary. He got a sailing coach diploma at the University of Physical Education in 1981.

== Career ==
From 1947 to 1966 he worked as a motor mechanic, aircraft technologist and a quality control man. In his last years in Hungary from 1980-1986 technical leader for the Spartacus Sailing Club of Balatonföldvár. He emigrated to California in 1986.

He was a sailor at the sailing club at Balatonföldvár between 1946 and 1985. The club changed hands/names several times starting with Honvéd for 7 years, Építők for 2 years, Müvész for 4 years finally Spartacus, where he sailed from 1963 to 1985. He was a member of the national team of Hungary between 1957 and 1977. He was trained by Iván Dolesch.

== Successes, awards ==
Star

- Olympic Games
  - 12.: 1960, Rome
- European Championship
  - 7.: 1961 Kiel
  - 13.: 1960, Bendor
- National Championship
  - champion: 1959, 1961, 1963, 1966, 1971, 1976
  - 2.: 1962, 1964, 1965, 1969, 1977, 1980
  - 3.: 1968, 1970, 1974
- Kék szalag
  - absolute winner: 1975, During 26
