= Jean-Philippe L'Huillier =

Swiss sailor

Personal information
- Nationality: Swiss
- Born: 19 January 1951
- Died: 29 March 2016 (aged 65)

Sport
- Sport: Sailing

Jean-Philippe L'Huillier (19 January 1951 – 29 March 2016) was a Swiss sailor. He competed in the Star event at the 1980 Summer Olympics.
