= Iain Woolward =

British sailor

Personal information
- Born: 14 March 1949 (age 76); Edinburgh, Scotland

Sport
- Sport: Sailing

Iain Woolward (born 14 March 1949) is a British sailor. He competed in the Star event at the 1984 Summer Olympics.
