= Tomasz Holc =

Polish sailor

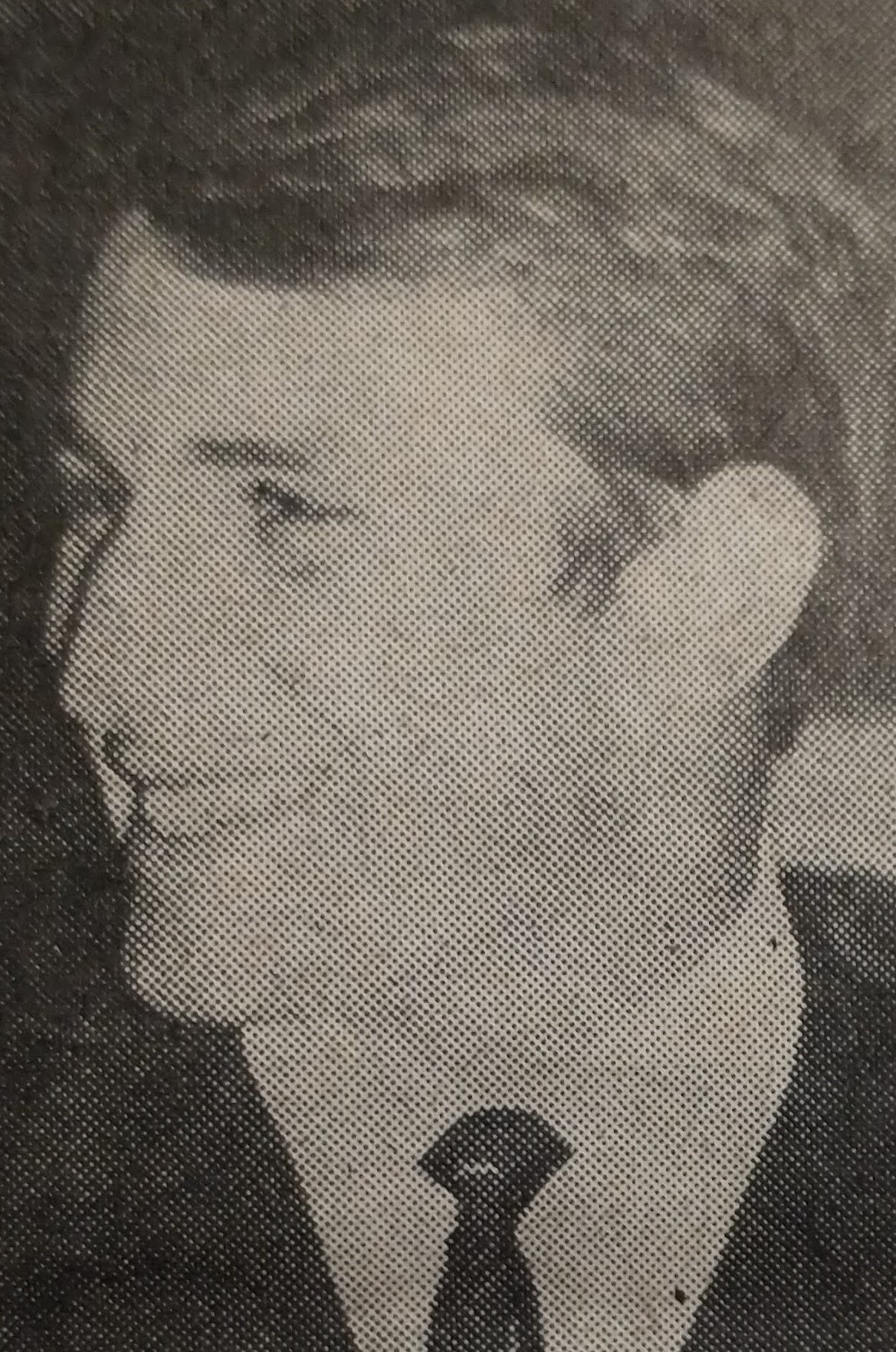
- Holc in 1973

Personal information
- Nationality: Polish
- Born: 4 June 1947 (age 77); Warsaw, Poland

Sport
- Sport: Sailing

Tomasz Holc (born 4 June 1947) is a Polish sailor. He competed iat the 1972 Summer Olympics and the 1980 Summer Olympics.
