= Kent Carlsson (sailor) =

Swedish sailor

Kent Halvor Carlsson (born 23 August 1951 in Gothenburg, Sweden) is a retired Swedish Olympic sailor in the Finn and Star classes. He competed in the 1976 Summer Olympics, 1980 Summer Olympics and in the 1984 Summer Olympics, best finishing 4th in the 1984 edition together with Henrik Eyermann in Star.
