= José María Benavides =

Spanish sailor (1945–2024)

Personal information
- Nationality: Spanish
- Born: 7 January 1945; Elgoibar, Spain
- Died: 8 March 2024 (aged 79); San Sebastián, Spain

Sport
- Sport: Sailing

José María Benavides (7 January 1945 – 8 March 2024) was a Spanish sailor. He competed at the 1976 Summer Olympics and the 1980 Summer Olympics.

Benavides died on 8 March 2024, at the age of 79.
