= Henrik Eyermann =

Swedish sailor

Henrik Eyermann (born 12 June 1961 in Limhamn, Sweden) is a Swedish former Olympic sailor in the Star class. He competed in the 1984 Summer Olympics together with Kent Carlsson, where they finished 4th.
