= David Howlett =

British sailor

David Howlett MBE
Personal information
- Nationality: British
- Born: 24 November 1951 (age 73); Wellingborough, England

Sport
- Sport: Sailing

David "Sid" John Howlett (born 24 November 1951) is a British sailor. He competed at the 1976 Summer Olympics and the 1992 Summer Olympics. He went on to coaching supporting both Iain Percy and Ben Ainslie to Olympic Gold. In the 2013 New Year Honours, Howlett was appointed an MBE for services to "sailing and the London 2012 Olympic and Paralympic Games".
