= Aleksandr Muzychenko =

Soviet sailor

Medal record

Sailing

Representing Soviet Union

Olympic Games
Gold medal – first place	1980 Moscow	Star class

Aleksandr Aleksejevich Muzychenko (Russian: Александр Алексеевич Музыченко; born 7 May 1955) is a retired Soviet/Russian sailor, Olympic champion for the USSR team.

He started to sail in the age of 6, in Omsk, at the river Irtish, He scored his Olympic triumph in star class at the 1980 Summer Olympics in Tallinn, together with Valentin Mankin. Now Aleksandr Muzychenko lives in Latvia, Riga and sails the Dragon class.

== Bibliography ==
- Bibliographic library
- Gazete.ru Re: Moscow – 1980
