= Heinz Maurer =

Swiss sailor

Personal information
- Nationality: Swiss
- Born: 28 February 1936 (age 89)
- Died: 08.08.2025; Sigriswil/BE

Sport
- Sport: Sailing

Heinz Maurer (born 28 February 1936) is a Swiss sailor. He competed in the Star event at the 1980 Summer Olympics.
