= Reto Heilig =

Swiss sailor

Personal information
- Nationality: Swiss
- Born: 13 March 1947 (age 78)

Sport
- Sport: Sailing

Reto Heilig (born 13 March 1947) is a Swiss sailor. He competed in the Star event at the 1984 Summer Olympics.
