= Sune Carlsson =

Swedish sailor (1931–2024)

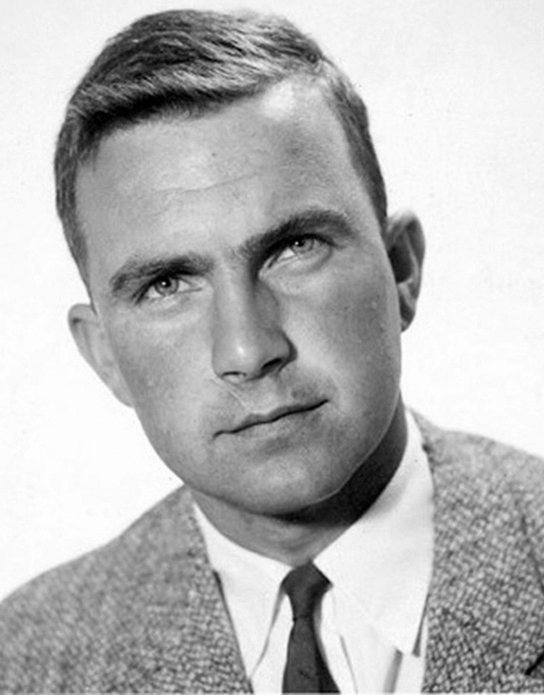

Personal information
- Full name: Sune Evert Carlsson
- Born: 21 December 1931 Stockholm, Sweden
- Died: 2 July 2024 (aged 92)

Sailing career
- Sport: Sailing
- Club: Rastaflottiljen, Stockholm
- Class: Star
Medal record
Representing Sweden
Sailing
World Championships
Silver medal – second place	1977 Kiel	Star

Sune Evert Carlsson (21 December 1931 – 2 July 2024) was a Swedish Olympic sailor in the Star class and boatbuilder. He competed in the 1960 Summer Olympics, where he finished 10th in the Star class together with Per-Olof Carlsson and won a silver medal at the 1977 Star World Championships together with Leif Carlsson.

== Biography ==
Carlsson was born in Stockholm on 21 December 1931. When he grew up, he sailed with model boats on Bällstaån and started to build his own boats at the age of 13. In 1950, he won his first of several Star Swedish Championships, 1954 he won it as helmsman, and in 1956 he qualified for the Star event at the 1956 Summer Olympics together with Olle Carlsson, but was rejected by the Swedish Olympic Committee due to their young age. He was selected for the Star event at the 1960 Summer Olympics, where he finished 10th together with Per-Olof Carlsson.

In 1963, Carlsson took over the boat yard Moranäsvarvet in Stockholm with the new name Sune Carlssons båtvarv. He was a reserve and boatman for the Swedish team at the 5.5 Metre event at the 1968 Summer Olympics, after having lost the qualification to the future gold medal winners Ulf Sundelin, Jörgen Sundelin, and Peter Sundelin. Carlsson had built their winning boat Wasa IV.

In 1977, Carlsson, together with Leif Carlsson won the silver medal at the 1977 Star World Championships in Kiel. Carlsson and Carlsson were the only contenders to future winners Dennis Conner and Ron Anderson before the last race, but Conner and Anderson won the last race while the Carlssons finished 21st.

In 2015, at the age of 84, he competed in the Star Swedish Championship. In October 2017, Carlsson was inducted to the Swedish Sailing Hall of Fame as its ninth inductee. He died on 2 July 2024, at the age of 92.
