= Vicente Brun =

Brazilian sailor

Vicente "Vince" d'Avila Melo Brun (born April 14, 1947) is a Brazilian-American Olympic sailor and sail maker that competed in the Soling class at the 1976 and 1980 Summer Olympics. 1976, he finished 10th together with his brother Gastão Brun and Andreas Wengert, and in 1980 he finished 6th together with his brother and Roberto Luiz Souza. He also won three Soling World Championship (1978, 1981, 1983) and the 1986 Star World Championship and participated in the Stars & Stripes America's Cup campaign. Brun moved to the United States in 1975.

Brun was inducted into the National Sailing Hall of Fame in 2018.
