= Mauro Testa =

Italian yacht racer (1947–2021)

Mauro Testa (19 February 1947 – 29 July 2021) was an Italian yacht racer who competed in the 1972 Summer Olympics. He died on 29 July 2021, at the age of 74.
