= Mathias Tallberg =

Finnish sailor

Personal information
- Nationality: Finnish
- Born: 7 March 1960 (age 65); Helsinki, Finland

Sport
- Sport: Sailing

Mathias Tallberg (born 7 March 1960) is a Finnish sailor. He competed in the Star event at the 1980 Summer Olympics.
