= Alfio Peraboni =

Italian sailor

Personal information
- Nationality: Italian
- Born: May 8, 1954 Monza, Italy
- Died: 12 January 2011 (aged 56) Monza, Italy

Sport
- Country: Italy
- Sport: Sailing
- Event: Star
Medal record
Men's sailing
Representing Italy
Olympic Games
Bronze medal – third place	1980 Moscow	Star
Bronze medal – third place	1984 Los Angeles	Star
Star World Championships
Gold medal – first place	1984 Vilamoura	Star
Bronze medal – third place	1980 Rio de Janeiro	Star

Alfio Peraboni (8 May 1954 – 12 January 2011) was an Italian competitive sailor and Olympic medalist. He won a bronze medal in the Star class at the 1980 Summer Olympics in Moscow together with Giorgio Gorla, and also a bronze medal at the 1984 Summer Olympics in Los Angeles. He was born and died in Monza.
