= Gastão Brun =

Brazilian sailor (born 1944)

Gastão d'Avila Melo Brun (born October 13, 1944) is a Brazilian Olympic sailor in the Soling class in the 1976 and 1980 Summer Olympics. In 1976, he finished 10th together with his brother Vicente Brun and Andreas Wengert, and in 1980 he finished 6th together with his brother and Roberto Luiz Souza. He has also won two Soling World Championship and sailed in the Star World Championship.
