= Håkan Lindström =

Swedish sailor

Nils Håkan Lindström (born 21 March 1952 in Luleå, Sweden) is a Swedish former Olympic sailor in the Star class. He competed in the 1980 Summer Olympics together with Peter Sundelin, where they finished 4th.
