= Jorge Zarif Neto =

Brazilian sailor

Jorge Zarif Neto (11 September 1957 – 12 March 2008 in São Paulo, Brazil) was a Brazilian Olympic sailor. He competed in the Finn class in the 1984 Summer Olympics (finishing eighth) and in the 1988 Summer Olympics (finishing 19th). He was the father of Brazilian Olympic sailor Jorge Zarif.
