= Boudewijn Binkhorst =

Dutch sailor (1942–2021)

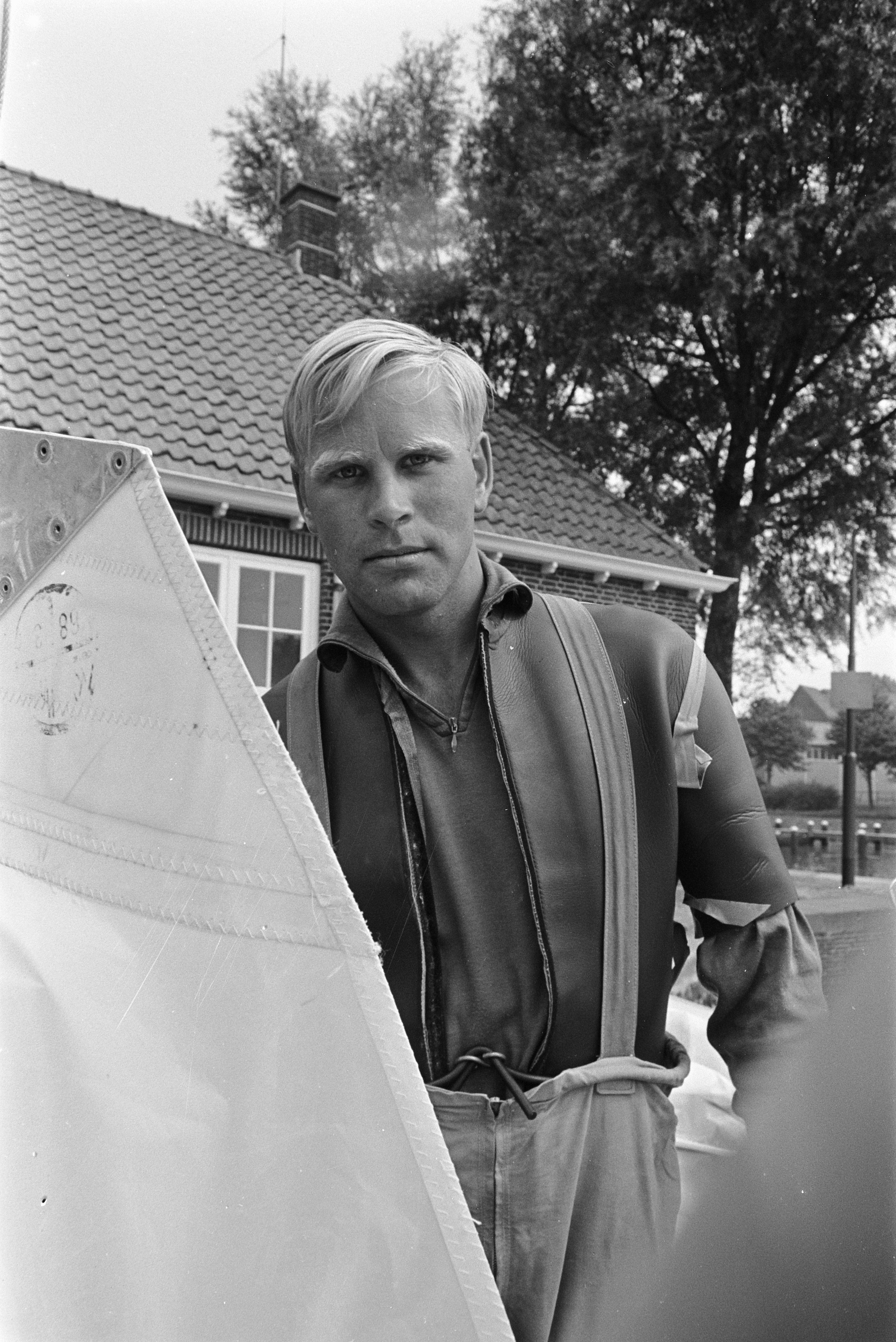
- Boudewijn Binkhorst during the 1968 European Championship Finn in Medemblik.

Personal information
- Full name: Hans Boudewijn Binkhorst
- Nationality: Dutch
- Born: 17 September 1942 Oegstgeest, Netherlands
- Died: 16 July 2021 (aged 78) Breskens, Netherlands
- Height: 1.83 m (6.0 ft)

Sailing career
- Sport: Sailing
- Classes: Finn; Star
- Updated on 2014-01-28

Hans Boudewijn Binkhorst (17 September 1942 – 16 July 2021) was a Dutch sailor who represented his country at the 1968 Summer Olympics in Acapulco. Binkhorst, on the Dutch Finn, took the 19th place. Since in 1980 The Netherlands did boycott the Moscow Olympic Games Binkhorst in the Star represented his National Olympic Committee under the Dutch NOC flag . With crew member Kobus Vandenberg. They took 6th place. The last Olympic appearance of Binkhorst was during the 1984 Olympics again in the Star and this time with crew Willem van Walt Meijer. They took eighth place.

== Controversies ==
1980: Several countries did boycott the 1980 Summer Olympics, others like France did not go since they found the competition devalued. As result only half of the expected fleet was present during the Olympic regattas. 1982: Just before the start of the 1982 Star World Championship in Medemblik Binkhorst took, by legal procedure, possession of five valuable prizes of the Star Class Organisation (ISCYRA). This was the result of a conflict between Binkhorst (and a German boatbuilder) and the ISCYRA about the creation of an unsinkable Star. One outcome was that the team of Binkhorst and Willem van Walt Meijer did not start at the Worlds and missed an opportunity to qualify for the Olympics.

Binkhorst became European champion Finn in 1971 and came second at the World championship Finn in 1975. Both after long periods of not participating because of professional obligations.

== Personal life and death ==
Binkhorst studied Medicine at the Groningen University. Later he worked as Physician, e.g. at the Sportmedisch Adviescentrum, Amersfoort. He died in Breskens on 16 July 2021, at the age of 78.

== Sources ==
- "Boudewijn Binkhorst Bio, Stats, and Results". Olympic Sports. Sports-Reference.com. Archived from the original on 2020-04-18.
- "De Nederlandse afvaardiging" (in Dutch). Limburgsch dagblad. 1968-10-11.
- "Zeilers hebben geen tijd om uit te huilen" (in Dutch). De tĳd : dagblad voor Nederland. 1968-11-09.
- "Boudewijn Binkhorst" (in Dutch). Medich Contact. 2012-07-13. Archived from the original on 2014-02-02.
- "The Games of the XIX Olympiad Mexico 1968, The Official Report of the Organizing Committee Volume One Part One" (PDF). 1968. Archived from the original (pdf) on 2008-11-18.
- "The Games of the XIX Olympiad Mexico 1968, The Official Report of the Organizing Committee Volume One Part Two" (PDF). 1968. Archived from the original (pdf) on 2008-11-18.
- "The Games of the XIX Olympiad Mexico 1968, The Official Report of the Organizing Committee Volume Two Part One" (PDF). 1968. Archived from the original (pdf) on 2008-11-18.
- "The Games of the XIX Olympiad Mexico 1968, The Official Report of the Organizing Committee Volume Two Part Two" (PDF). 1968. Archived from the original (pdf) on 2008-11-18.
- "The Games of the XIX Olympiad Mexico 1968, The Official Report of the Organizing Committee Volume Three Part One" (PDF). 1968. Archived from the original (pdf) on 2008-02-26.
- "The Games of the XIX Olympiad Mexico 1968, The Official Report of the Organizing Committee Volume Three Part Two" (PDF). 1968. Archived from the original (pdf) on 2008-11-18.
- "The Games of the XIX Olympiad Mexico 1968, The Official Report of the Organizing Committee Volume Four Part One" (PDF). 1968. Archived from the original (pdf) on 2008-11-18.
- "The Games of the XIX Olympiad Mexico 1968, The Official Report of the Organizing Committee Volume Four Part Two" (PDF). 1968. Archived from the original (pdf) on 2008-11-18.
- "Zeilers:, We gaan'" (in Dutch). De Telegraaf. 1980-05-16.
- "Zeilploeg bleef buiten de medailles" (in Dutch). De Telegraaf. 1980-07-30.
- "Staartjes: "Het heeft niet meegezeten" Geen medailles voor Nederlandse zeilers" (in Dutch). De waarheid. 1980-07-31.
- "Franse zeilploeg blijft thuis" (in Dutch). Amigoe. 1980-05-22.
- "Games of the XXII Olympiad, Volume I: Moscow, Tallinn, Leningrad, Kiev and Minsk" (PDF). Fizkultura i Sport Publishers. 1981. Archived from the original (PDF) on 2013-10-17.
- "Games of the XXII Olympiad, Volume II: Organisation" (PDF). Fizkultura i Sport Publishers. 1981. Archived from the original (PDF) on 2013-10-17.
- "Games of the XXII Olympiad, Volume III: Participants and Results" (PDF). Fizkultura i Sport Publishers. 1981. Archived from the original (PDF) on October 17, 2013.
- "Oranje équipe met 207 personen op de Zomerspelen". Dagblad De Telegraaf (in Dutch). 1984-07-11.
- "Toppers bijeen in Hyeres Olympisch zeilexamen". Dagblad De Telegraaf (in Dutch). 1984-04-19.
- "Aspiraties". Dagblad De Telegraaf (in Dutch). 1984-04-30.
- "Verwachtingen voor Los Angeles hoog gespannen Gouden kansen voor olympische zeilptoeg". Dagblad De Telegraaf (in Dutch). 1984-07-28.
- "Zeilcoach rekent op een medaille". Dagblad De Telegraaf (in Dutch). 1984-07-31.
- "Zeilers smeken om meer wind". Dagblad De Telegraaf (in Dutch). 1984-08-03.
- "Zeilers verspelen kansen op medaille Tijdperk 'Vliegende Hollanders' voorbij". Dagblad De Telegraaf (in Dutch). 1984-08-08.
- "Grote rel in zeilwereld". De Telegraaf (in Dutch). 1982-08-25.
- "Bootontwerper in de clinch met organisatie WK zeilen starklasse". Amigoe (in Dutch). 1982-08-25.
- "Surfgoud kan impuls geven Watersport wacht op frisse wind". Dagblad De Telegraaf (in Dutch). 1984-08-11.
- "Boudewijn Binkhorst geconfronteerd met kort geding". Het vrĳe volk : democratisch-socialistisch dagblad (in Dutch). 1982-08-27.
- Official Report Los Angeles 1984, Volume 1: Organization and Planning (part 1) (PDF). Los Angeles: Los Angeles Olympic Organizing Committee. 1985. Archived from the original (PDF) on January 28, 2015.
- Official Report Los Angeles 1984, Volume 1: Organization and Planning (part 2) (PDF). Los Angeles: Los Angeles Olympic Organizing Committee. 1985. Archived from the original (PDF) on October 17, 2013.
- Official Report Los Angeles 1984, Volume 1: Organization and Planning (part 3) (PDF). Los Angeles: Los Angeles Olympic Organizing Committee. 1985. Archived from the original (PDF) on October 17, 2013.
- Official Report Los Angeles 1984, Volume 2: Competition and Summary and Results (part 1) (PDF). Los Angeles: Los Angeles Olympic Organizing Committee. 1985. Archived from the original (PDF) on October 17, 2013.
- Official Report Los Angeles 1984, Volume 2: Competition and Summary and Results (part 2) (PDF). Los Angeles: Los Angeles Olympic Organizing Committee. 1985. Archived from the original (PDF) on October 7, 2013.
- Official Report Los Angeles 1984, Volume 2: Competition and Summary and Results (part 3) (PDF). Los Angeles: Los Angeles Olympic Organizing Committee. 1985. Archived from the original (PDF) on October 17, 2013.
