= Kobus Vandenberg =

Dutch sailor (born 1950)

Personal information
- Full name: Jacobus Vandenberg
- Nationality: Dutch
- Born: 17 July 1950 (age 76) Hilversum, Netherlands
- Height: 1.84 m (6.0 ft)

Sailing career
- Sport: Sailing
- Class: Star

Jacobus "Kobus" Vandenberg (born 17 July 1950, in Hilversum) is a sailor from the Netherlands. Since the Netherlands did boycott the Moscow Olympic Games Vandenberg represented his National Olympic Committee at the 1980 Summer Olympics, which was boycotted by several countries, in Tallinn, USSR under the Dutch NOC flag. With Boudewijn Binkhorst as helmsman, Vandenberg took the 6th place in the Star. In the 1988 Olympics in Pusan Vandenberg made his second Olympic appearance. Again in the Dutch Star this time with Steven Bakker as helmsman. They took 9th place.

== Sources ==
- "Kobus Vandenberg Bio, Stats, and Results". Olympic Sports. Sports-Reference.com. Archived from the original on 18 April 2020.
- "Zeilers:, We gaan'" (in Dutch). De Telegraaf. 16 May 1980.
- "Zeilploeg bleef buiten de medailles" (in Dutch). De Telegraaf. 30 July 1980.
- "Staartjes: "Het heeft niet meegezeten" Geen medailles voor Nederlandse zeilers" (in Dutch). De waarheid. 31 July 1980.
- "Franse zeilploeg blijft thuis" (in Dutch). Amigoe. 22 May 1980.
- "Games of the XXII Olympiad, Volume I: Moscow, Tallinn, Leningrad, Kiev and Minsk" (PDF). Fizkultura i Sport Publishers. 1981. Archived from the original (PDF) on 17 October 2013.
- "Games of the XXII Olympiad, Volume II: Organisation" (PDF). Fizkultura i Sport Publishers. 1981. Archived from the original (PDF) on 17 October 2013.
- "Games of the XXII Olympiad, Volume III: Participants and Results" (PDF). Fizkultura i Sport Publishers. 1981. Archived from the original (PDF) on 17 October 2013.
- "De Nederlandse olympische zeilploeg". De Telegraaf (in Dutch). 10 September 1988.
- "Nederlandse zeilploeg met lege handen naar huis". De Telegraaf (in Dutch). 28 September 1988.
- Official Report, Volume 1: Organization and Planning (PDF). Seoul: Olympic Organizing Committee. 1989. Archived from the original (PDF) on 4 March 2016.
- Official Report, Volume 2: Competition, Summary and Results (PDF). Seoul: Seoul Olympic Organizing Committee. 1989. Archived from the original (PDF) on 7 October 2013.
- "De Nederlandse olympische zeilploeg". De Telegraaf (in Dutch). 10 September 1988.
- "Nederlandse zeilploeg met lege handen naar huis". De Telegraaf (in Dutch). 28 September 1988.
- Official Report, Volume 1: Organization and Planning (PDF). Seoul: Olympic Organizing Committee. 1989. Archived from the original (PDF) on 4 March 2016.
- Official Report, Volume 2: Competition, Summary and Results (PDF). Seoul: Seoul Olympic Organizing Committee. 1989. Archived from the original (PDF) on 7 October 2013.
