= Flavio Scala =

Italian yacht racer (born 1945)

Flavio Scala (born 1 April 1945) is an Italian former yacht racer who competed in the 1972 Summer Olympics.
