= Peter Erzberger =

Brazilian sailor (born 1941)

Peter Erzberger (born 3 September 1941) is a Brazilian former Olympic sailor in the Star class. He competed in the 1980 Summer Olympics together with Eduardo de Souza, where they finished 9th.
