= William Parks (sailor) =

American sailor (1921–2008)

Bill Parks
Personal information
- Full name: William Wilson "Bill" Parks
- Born: December 11, 1921 Oak Park, Illinois, USA
- Died: December 10, 2008 (aged 86) Glenview, Illinois

Sailing career
- Sport: Sailing
- Club: Chicago Yacht Club
Medal record
Men's sailing
Representing United States
Olympic Games
| Bronze medal – third place | 1960 Rome | Star |

William W. Parks (1921–2008) was an American competitive sailor and Olympic medalist.

He and Robert Halperin won a bronze medal for the United States in the Star class (mixed two-person keelboat) at the 1960 Summer Olympics in Rome. Their yacht was the Shrew II.

Parks was born in Oak Park, Illinois on December 11, 1921. He died in Glenview, Illinois on December 10, 2008.
