= Eduardo de Souza =

Brazilian sailor

Eduardo Ramos de Souza (born November 3, 1944) is a Brazilian former Olympic sailor in the Star class. He competed in the 1980 Summer Olympics together with Peter Erzberger, where they finished 9th, and in the 1984 Summer Olympics together with Roberto Souza, where they finished 12th.
