= Giorgio Gorla =

Italian sailor

Olympic medal record

Representing Italy

Men's Sailing
| Bronze medal – third place | 1980 Moscow | Star class |
| Bronze medal – third place | 1984 Los Angeles | Star class |

Giorgio Gorla (born 7 August 1944 in Novara) is an Italian sailor. He is a 3-time Olympian, winning two bronze medals.
