= List of European Championships medalists in sailing =

This is a List of European Championships medalists in sailing.

== 12 Metre ==
Year	Gold	Silver	Bronze
2017 Flensburg	Wings (FIN); Philipp Skafte-Holm	Trivia (GER); Wilfried Beeck	Vim (USA); Patrick Howaldt

== 49er ==
Year	Gold	Silver	Bronze
2016 Barcelona			
2017 Kiel	Great Britain; Dylan Fletcher; Stuart Bithell	Great Britain; James Peters; Fynn Sterritt	Italy; Jacopo Plazzi; Andrea Tesei
2018 Gdynia	Spain; Diego Botín; Iago López	Poland; Dominik Buksak; Szymon Wierzbicki	Great Britain; Dylan Fletcher; Stuart Bithell
2019 Weymouth	Great Britain; Dylan Fletcher; Stuart Bithell	Great Britain; James Peters; Fynn Sterritt	Spain; Diego Botín; Iago López
2020 Lake Attersee	Germany; Tim Fischer; Fabian Graf	Austria; Benjamin Bildstein; David Hussl	Croatia; Šime Fantela; Mihovil Fantela
2021 Thessaloniki	Poland; Mikołaj Staniul; Jakub Sztorch	Germany; Tim Fischer; Fabian Graf	Poland; Łukasz Przybytek; Paweł Kołodziński
2022 Aarhus	Spain; Diego Botín; Florián Trittel	Netherlands; Bart Lambriex; Floris van de Werken	Great Britain; James Peters; Fynn Sterritt
2023 Vilamoura	France; Lucas Rual; Émile Amoros	Poland; Dominik Buksak; Szymon Wierzbicki	Austria; Benjamin Bildstein; David Hussl
2024 La Grande-Motte	Great Britain; James Peters; Fynn Sterritt	Switzerland; Sébastien Schneiter; Arno de Planta	Netherlands; Bart Lambriex; Floris van de Werken
2025 Thessaloniki	Spain; Martín Wizner; Jaime Wizner	Great Britain; William Pank; Thommie Grit	Israel; Tal Sade; Maor Abu
2026 Eckernförde	Great Britain; James Grummett; Rhos Hawes	Poland; Mikołaj Staniul; Jakub Sztorch	Germany; Richard Schultheis; Fabian Rieger

== 49er FX ==
Year	Gold	Silver	Bronze
2016 Barcelona			
2017 Kiel	Germany; Tina Lutz; Susann Beucke	Great Britain; Charlotte Dobson; Saskia Tidey	Germany; Victoria Jurczok; Anika Lorenz
2018 Gdynia	Norway; Helene Næss; Marie Rønningen	Germany; Victoria Jurczok; Anika Lorenz	Great Britain; Sophie Weguelin; Sophie Ainsworth
2019 Weymouth	Netherlands; Annemiek Bekkering; Annette Duetz	Norway; Helene Næss; Marie Rønningen	Sweden; Vilma Bobeck; Malin Tengström
2020 Lake Attersee	Germany; Tina Lutz; Susann Beucke	Norway; Helene Næss; Marie Rønningen	Sweden; Julia Gross; Hanna Klinga
2021 Thessaloniki	Netherlands; Odile van Aanholt; Elise de Ruijter	Croatia; Enia Ninčević; Mihaela de Micheli Vitturi	Canada; Georgia Lewin-LaFrance; Antonia Lewin-LaFrance
2022 Aarhus	Netherlands; Odile van Aanholt; Annette Duetz	Sweden; Vilma Bobeck; Rebecca Netzler	Italy; Jana Germani; Giorgia Bertuzzi
2023 Vilamoura	Norway; Helene Næss; Marie Rønningen	Italy; Jana Germani; Giorgia Bertuzzi	Spain; Támara Echegoyen; Paula Barceló
2024 La Grande-Motte	Belgium; Isaura Maenhaut; Anouk Geurts	France; Sarah Steyaert; Charline Picon	Great Britain; Freya Black; Saskia Tidey
2025 Thessaloniki	Germany; Marla Bergmann; Hanna Wille	Poland; Aleksandra Melzacka; Sandra Jankowiak	Belgium; Isaura Maenhaut; Anouk Geurts
2026 Eckernförde	Germany; Marla Bergmann; Hanna Wille	France; Mathilde Lovadina; Lou Berthomieu	Poland; Aleksandra Melzacka; Sandra Jankowiak

== 470 ==
=== Open ===
Year	Gold	Silver	Bronze
1966 Boulogne-sur-Mer	France; Gabriel de Kergariou; Alain Cordonnier	France; Léon Brillouet; Blanchard	France; Jean-Claude Cornu; Jean Morin
1967 Lacanau	Belgium; Paul Maes; Daniel Quertainmont	France; Marc Bouet; Joël Desbois	France; Yves Pajot; Marc Pajot
1968 Palamós	France; Marc Bouet; Joël Desbois	France; Yves Pajot; Marc Pajot	France; Jean-Louis Brehant; Jean-François Brehant
1969 Castiglione della Pescaia	France; Marc Bouet; Michel Christ	France; Marc Laurent; Michel Cornic	Switzerland; Bernard de Gaudenzi; Malignon
1971 Southend-on-Sea	France; Philippe Follenfant; Hubert Follenfant	Netherlands; Tom van Essen; Wouter van Essen	Belgium; Paul Maes; Daniel Quertainmont
1972 Medemblik	Netherlands; Joop van Werkhoven; Robert van Werkhoven	France; Philippe Follenfant; Hubert Follenfant	Netherlands; Tom van Essen; Wouter van Essen
1973 Saint-Cast-le-Guildo	Denmark; Henrik Söderlund; Anders Børresen	West Germany; Frank Hübner; Klaus Feldmann	Netherlands; Joop van Werkhoven; Robert van Werkhoven
1974 El Masnou	France; Marc Bouet; Stéphane Fleury	Spain; Juan Santana; Francisco Colom	France; Philippe Follenfant; Hubert Follenfant
1975 Stokes Bay	Switzerland; Jean-Claude Vuithier; Laurent Quellet	Norway; C. Aazer; Walter	West Germany; Frank Hübner; Harro Bode
1976 Hellerup	Sweden; Olle Johansson; Lars Johansson	Denmark; Lars Lønberg; Dan Ibsen Sørensen	Poland; Leon Wróbel; Tomasz Stocki
1977 Rust	Soviet Union; Yuri Koriachkin; Vasili Koriachkin	East Germany; Helmar Nauck; Harald Schaale	Israel; Shimshon Brokman; Eitan Friedlander
1978 Cascais	Soviet Union; Mikhail Kudryavtsev; Edgar Terekhin	Israel; Shimshon Brokman; Eitan Friedlander	Poland; Leon Wróbel; Tomasz Stocki
1979 Dénia	Israel; Shimshon Brokman; Eitan Friedlander	West Germany; Wolfgang Hunger; Niels Korte	Poland; Leon Wróbel; Tomasz Stocki
1980 Helsinki	East Germany; Jörn Borowski; Egbert Svensson	France; Daniel Péponnet; Thierry Peponnet	Soviet Union; Vladimir Ignatenko; Sergei Jdanov
1981 Morges	Italy; Tommaso Chieffi; Enrico Chieffi	East Germany; Jörn Borowski; Egbert Svensson	Italy; Sandro Montefusco; Paolo Montefusco
1982 Balatonfüred	East Germany; Jurgen Brietzke; Ekkehard Schulz	Israel; Shimshon Brokman; Eitan Friedlander	France; Thierry Peponnet; Luc Pillot
1983 Puck	East Germany; Jörn Borowski; Egbert Svensson	Italy; Sandro Montefusco; Paolo Montefusco	France; Thierry Peponnet; Luc Pillot
1984 Salou	Finland; Peter von Koskull; Johan von Koskull	Netherlands; John Stavenuiter; Guido Alkemade	Netherlands; Hans Duetz; Jan Bos
1985 Koper	Spain; Luis Doreste; Roberto Molina	Italy; Gianfranco Noe; Andrea Ballico	Italy; Tommaso Chieffi; Enrico Chieffi

=== Men and Mixed ===
Year	Gold	Silver	Bronze
1986 Sønderborg	France; Thierry Péponnet; Luc Pillot	Netherlands; Hans Duetz; Jan Bos	East Germany; Jurgen Brietzke; Ekkehard Schulz
1987 Lysekil	Finland; Peter von Koskull; Johan von Koskull	France; Thierry Péponnet; Luc Pillot	Spain; Jordi Calafat; Roberto Molina
1988 Quiberon	France; Thierry Péponnet; Luc Pillot	Italy; Sandro Montefusco; Paolo Montefusco	Finland; Peter von Koskull; Johan von Koskull
1989 Balatonfüred	Italy; Sandro Montefusco; Paolo Montefusco	West Germany; Wolfgang Hunger; Rolf Schmidt	France; Jean-François Berthet; Gwenaël Berthet
1990 Marina di Carrara	Italy; Giovanni Cassinari; Daniele Cassinari	Switzerland; Stefan Seger; Dominik Liener	West Germany; Rainer Schulz; Frank Thieme
1991 Bergen	Norway; Herman Horn Johannessen; Pal Mccarthy	Netherlands; Ben Kouwenhoven; Jan Kouwenhoven	Germany; Wolfgang Hunger; Rolf Schmidt
1992 Nieuwpoort	Estonia; Tõnu Tõniste; Toomas Tõniste	Sweden; Magnus Lundgren; Urban Lagneus	Netherlands; Ben Kouwenhoven; Jan Kouwenhoven
1993 Breitenbrunn	Sweden; Markus Westerlind; Henrik Wallin	Germany; Michael Koch; Stefan Theuerkauf	Israel; Shay Bachar; Ilan Tshtash
1994 Röbel	Italy; Matteo Ivaldi; Michele Ivaldi	Great Britain; John Merricks; Ian Walker	Spain; Jordi Calafat; Kiko Sánchez
1995 Båstad	Great Britain; John Merricks; Ian Walker	Finland; Petri Leskinen; Mika Aarnika	Germany; Ronald Rensch; Torsten Haverland
1996 Hayling Island	Russia; Dmitry Berezkin; Yevgeny Burmatnov	Portugal; Hugo Rocha; Nuno Barreto	Great Britain; John Merricks; Ian Walker
1997 Nieuwpoort	Portugal; Hugo Rocha; Nuno Barreto	Ukraine; Yevhen Braslavets; Ihor Matviyenko	Finland; Petri Leskinen; Kristian Heinilä
1998 Çeşme	Portugal; Hugo Rocha; Nuno Barreto	Slovenia; Tomaž Čopi; Mitja Margon	Portugal; Álvaro Marinho; Miguel Nunes
1999 Zadar	Sweden; Johan Molund; Mattias Rahm	Slovenia; Tomaž Čopi; Mitja Margon	France; Gildas Philippe; Tanguy Cariou
2000 Malcesine	France; Gildas Philippe; Tanguy Cariou	Italy; Matteo Ivaldi; Francesco Ivaldi	Spain; Gustavo Martinez; Tunte Cantero
2001 Dún Laoghaire	Ukraine; Yevhen Braslavets; Ihor Matviyenko	Israel; Gideon Kliger; Udi Gal	Italy; Gabrio Zandonà; Andrea Trani
2002 Tallinn	France; Nicolas Charbonnier; Stéphane Christidis	Greece; Andreas Kosmatopoulos; Konstantinos Trigonis	Great Britain; Nick Rogers; Jonathan Glanfield
2003 Brest	France; Gildas Philippe; Nicolas Le Berre	Germany; Lucas Zellmer; Felix Krabbe	Sweden; Johan Molund; Martin Andersson
2004 Warnemünde	Great Britain; Nick Rogers; Jonathan Glanfield	Russia; Dmitry Berezkin; Mikhail Krutikov	Sweden; Johan Molund; Martin Andersson
2005 Gdynia	Great Britain; Nick Rogers; Jonathan Glanfield	Israel; Gideon Kliger; Udi Gal	Netherlands; Sven Coster; Kalle Coster
2006 Balatonfüred	France; Benjamin Bonnaud; Romain Bonnaud	France; Ronan Dreano; Ronan Floch	France; Pierre Leboucher; Vincent Garos
2007 Thessaloniki	Portugal; Álvaro Marinho; Miguel Nunes	France; Nicolas Charbonnier; Olivier Bausset	Italy; Gabrio Zandonà; Andrea Trani
2008 Riva del Garda	Great Britain; Nic Asher; Elliot Willis	Netherlands; Sven Coster; Kalle Coster	Israel; Gideon Kliger; Udi Gal
2009 Traunsee	Croatia; Šime Fantela; Igor Marenić	Germany; Lucas Zellmer; Heiko Seelig	Italy; Gabrio Zandonà; Edoardo Mancinelli Scotti
2010 Istanbul	Greece; Panagiotis Mantis; Pavlos Kagialis	Israel; Gideon Kliger; Eran Sela	Great Britain; Luke Patience; Stuart Bithell
2011 Helsinki	Croatia; Šime Fantela; Igor Marenić	Great Britain; Luke Patience; Stuart Bithell	Israel; Gideon Kliger; Eran Sela
2012 Largs	Croatia; Šime Fantela; Igor Marenić	Great Britain; Ben Saxton; Richard Mason	Russia; Mikhail Sheremetyev; Maksim Sheremetyev

=== Men ===
Year	Gold	Silver	Bronze
2013 Formia	France; Sofian Bouvet; Jérémie Mion	Great Britain; Luke Patience; Jonathan Glanfield	Croatia; Šime Fantela; Igor Marenić
2014 Athens	Great Britain; Luke Patience; Elliot Willis	Austria; Matthias Schmid; Florian Reichstädter	Croatia; Šime Fantela; Igor Marenić
2015 Aarhus	Germany; Ferdinand Gerz; Oliver Szymanski	Greece; Panagiotis Mantis; Pavlos Kagialis	Russia; Pavel Sozykin; Denis Gribanov
2016 Mallorca	France; Sofian Bouvet; Jérémie Mion	Croatia; Šime Fantela; Igor Marenić	Italy; Simon Sivitz Kosuta; Jas Farneti
2017 Monaco	Sweden; Carl-Fredrik Fock; Marcus Dackhammar	France; Guillaume Pirouelle; Jérémie Mion	Spain; Jordi Xammar; Nicolás Rodríguez
2018 Burgas	Sweden; Anton Dahlberg; Fredrik Bergström	Greece; Panagiotis Mantis; Pavlos Kagialis	Germany; Malte Winkel; Matti Cipra
2019 Sanremo	Sweden; Anton Dahlberg; Fredrik Bergström	Spain; Jordi Xammar; Nicolás Rodríguez	France; Kevin Peponnet; Jérémie Mion
2021 Vilamoura	France; Kevin Peponnet; Jérémie Mion	Spain; Jordi Xammar; Nicolás Rodríguez	Sweden; Anton Dahlberg; Fredrik Bergström

=== Women ===
Year	Gold	Silver	Bronze
1986 Sønderborg	France; Florence Lebrun; Sophie Berge	Netherlands; Wilma Kramer; Henneke Stavenuiter	Italy; Paola Porta; Anna Barabino
1987 Lysekil	Finland; Bettina Lemström; Annika Mannström	Netherlands; Henny Vegter; Marion Bultman	Sweden; Marit Söderström; Birgitta Bengtsson
1988 Quiberon	Netherlands; Henny Vegter; Marion Bultman	Sweden; Marit Söderström; Birgitta Bengtsson	East Germany; Peggy Hardwiger; Christina Pinnow
1989 Balatonfüred	East Germany; Peggy Hardwiger; Christina Pinnow	East Germany; Suzanne Theel; Wibke Buelle	Finland; Bettina Lemström; Annika Mannström
1990 Marina di Carrara	France; Florence Lebrun; Odile Barre	Spain; Núria Bover; Irene Martín	West Germany; Tanja Stemler; Sabine Lenkmann
1991 Bergen	Spain; Theresa Zabell; Patricia Guerra	Soviet Union; Larisa Moskalenko; Elena Pakholchik	Great Britain; Debbie Jarvis; Rosie Tribe
1992 Nieuwpoort	Spain; Theresa Zabell; Patricia Guerra	Italy; Maria Quarra; Anna Barabino	CIS; Larisa Moskalenko; Elena Pakholchik
1993 Breitenbrunn	Ukraine; Ruslana Taran; Svetlana Oleksenko	Germany; Susanne Meyer; Katrin Adlkofer	Germany; Nicola Birkner; Wibke Bülle
1994 Röbel	Spain; Theresa Zabell; Begoña Vía Dufresne	Germany; Tanja Stemler; Susanne Bergmann	Germany; Susanne Bauckholt; Katrin Adlkofer
1995 Båstad	Ukraine; Ruslana Taran; Elena Pakholchik	Germany; Ines Bohn; Sabine Rohatzsch	Spain; Laura León; Viviane Mainemare
1996 Hayling Island	Ukraine; Ruslana Taran; Elena Pakholchik	Germany; Susanne Bauckholt; Katrin Adlkofer	Germany; Peggy Bahr; Christina Pinnow
1997 Nieuwpoort	Ukraine; Ruslana Taran; Elena Pakholchik	Denmark; Susanne Ward; Michaela Ward	Italy; Federica Salvà; Emanuela Sossi
1998 Çeşme	Ukraine; Ruslana Taran; Elena Pakholchik	Germany; Stephanie Trübel; Carolin Grosser	Greece; Sofia Bekatorou; Emilia Tsoulfa
1999 Zadar	Ukraine; Ruslana Taran; Elena Pakholchik	Denmark; Susanne Ward; Michaela Ward	Netherlands; Lisa Westerhof; Alexandra Verbeek
2000 Malcesine	Greece; Sofia Bekatorou; Emilia Tsoulfa	Denmark; Susanne Ward; Michaela Ward	Russia; Vladilena Krachun; Natalia Gaponovich
2001 Dún Laoghaire	Greece; Sofia Bekatorou; Emilia Tsoulfa	Spain; Natalia Vía Dufresne; Sandra Azón	Israel; Nike Kornecki; Vered Buskila
2002 Tallinn	Greece; Sofia Bekatorou; Emilia Tsoulfa	Russia; Vladelina Ilienko; Diana Krutskikh	Netherlands; Lisa Westerhof; Margriet Matthijsse
2003 Brest	Spain; Natalia Vía Dufresne; Sandra Azón	Slovenia; Vesna Dekleva; Klara Maučec	Sweden; Therese Torgersson; Vendela Zachrisson-Santén
2004 Warnemünde	Denmark; Susanne Ward; Michaela Ward	Russia; Vladelina Ilienko; Natalia Gaponovich	Israel; Nike Kornecki; Vered Buskila
2005 Gdynia	France; Ingrid Petitjean; Nadège Douroux	Israel; Nike Kornecki; Vered Buskila	Sweden; Therese Torgersson; Vendela Zachrisson-Santén
2006 Balatonfüred	Germany; Stefanie Rothweiler; Vivien Kussatz	Austria; Sylvia Vogl; Carolina Flatscher	Spain; Marina Gallego; Laia Tutzó
2007 Thessaloniki	Germany; Stefanie Rothweiler; Vivien Kussatz	Italy; Giulia Conti; Giovanna Micol	Italy; Elisabetta Saccheggiani; Elisa Cecconi
2008 Riva del Garda	Austria; Sylvia Vogl; Carolina Flatscher	Switzerland; Emmanuelle Rol; Anne-Sophie Thilo	Slovenia; Vesna Dekleva; Klara Maučec
2009 Traunsee	Italy; Giulia Conti; Giovanna Micol	Spain; Tara Pacheco; Berta Betanzos	Greece; Anthi Economou; Olga Tsigaridi
2010 Istanbul	France; Emmanuelle Rol; Hélène Defrance	Italy; Giulia Conti; Giovanna Micol	France; Ingrid Petitjean; Nadège Douroux
2011 Helsinki	Spain; Tara Pacheco; Berta Betanzos	Denmark; Henriette Koch; Lene Sommer	Great Britain; Hannah Mills; Saskia Clark
2012 Largs	Great Britain; Sophie Weguelin; Sophie Ainsworth	Slovenia; Tina Mrak; Teja Černe	Germany; Annika Bochmann; Elisabeth Panuschka
2013 Formia	France; Camille Lecointre; Mathilde Géron	Austria; Lara Vadlau; Jolanta Ogar	Great Britain; Sophie Weguelin; Eilidh McIntyre
2014 Athens	Austria; Lara Vadlau; Jolanta Ogar	Great Britain; Hannah Mills; Saskia Clark	Slovenia; Tina Mrak; Veronika Macarol
2015 Aarhus	Slovenia; Tina Mrak; Veronika Macarol	France; Camille Lecointre; Hélène Defrance	Great Britain; Sophie Weguelin; Eilidh McIntyre
2016 Mallorca	Austria; Lara Vadlau; Jolanta Ogar	Netherlands; Afrodite Kyranakou; Anneloes van Veen	Slovenia; Tina Mrak; Veronika Macarol
2017 Monaco	Netherlands; Afrodite Zegers; Anneloes van Veen	Italy; Elena Berta; Sveva Carraro	Poland; Agnieszka Skrzypulec; Jolanta Ogar
2018 Burgas	Slovenia; Tina Mrak; Veronika Macarol	Germany; Frederike Loewe; Anna Markfort	Germany; Nadine Boehm; Ann-Christin Goliass
2019 Sanremo	France; Camille Lecointre; Aloïse Retornaz	Great Britain; Hannah Mills; Eilidh McIntyre	Netherlands; Afrodite Zegers; Lobke Berkhout
2021 Vilamoura	France; Camille Lecointre; Aloïse Retornaz	Great Britain; Hannah Mills; Eilidh McIntyre	Switzerland; Linda Fahrni; Maja Siegenthaler

== Dragon ==
Year	Gold	Silver	Bronze
1978 Ostend	Netherlands; Ed Frech; Jan Bakker; Steven Vis		
1979			
1980	Austria; C. Scheineker		
1982	West Germany; Markus Glas		
1984	Denmark; Børge Børresen		
1986	West Germany; Markus Glas		
1987	West Germany; Markus Glas		
1988	Denmark; Poul Richard Høj Jensen		
1990	Denmark; Lars Hendriksen		
1992	Denmark; Poul Richard Høj Jensen		
1994	Germany; M. Erhard		
1995	Germany; H. Erich		
1996	Denmark; Poul Richard Høj Jensen		
1998	Netherlands; Fred Imhoff		
2000	Denmark; Poul Richard Høj Jensen		
2002 Thun	Germany; M. Erhard		
2003 Kinsale	Netherlands; Fred Imhoff; Richard van Rij; Rudy den Outer	Switzerland; Vincent Hoesch; Horro Kniffka; Bernd Faber	Denmark; Frank Berg; Soren Kaestel; Mads Christensen
2004 Tallinn	Germany; Harm Muller-Spreer	Denmark; Frank Berg	Germany; Werner Fritz
2005 La Trinité-sur-Mer	Denmark; Claus Høj Jensen	Great Britain; Poul Richard Høj Jensen	France; J. Pasturaud
2006 Cowes	Denmark; Lars Hendriksen		
2007 Hanko	Germany; Markus Wieser; Sergei Pughchev; Thomas Auracher	Germany; Wolfgang Rappel; Hans Jürgen Benze; Michael Lipp	Finland; Henrik Dahlman; Lars Henriksen; Oscar Dannström
2008 Oslo	Russia; Maxim Logutenko; Mikhail Senatorov; Vladimir Krutskih	Russia; Dmitry Berezkin; Igor Goihberg; Alexei Bushhuev	Germany; Thomas Müller; Vincent Hoesch; Maximilian Scheibmeyr
2009 St. Tropez	Ukraine; Markus Wieser; Sergey Pughchev; Matti Paschen	Germany; Markus Glas; Max Glas; Andreas Lohmann	Ukraine; Eugen Braslavets; Sergey Timokov; Michael Hestbek
2010 Balatonkenese	Ukraine; Markus Wieser; Sergey Pughchev; Matti Paschen	Russia; Dmitry Berezkin; Anatoly Kudritskiy; Aleksey Bushuev	Russia; Anatoly Logonov; Andrey Kirilyuk; Alexander Shalagin
2011 Boltenhagen	Denmark; Jens Christensen; Kim Andersen; Anders Bagger	Ukraine; Markus Wieser; Sergey Pughchev; Matti Paschen	Ukraine; Evgeny Braslavetz; Sergey Timokhov; Olexandr Myrchuk
2012 Attersee	Ukraine; Markus Wieser; Sergey Pughchev; Matti Paschen	Germany; Marcus Brennecke; Vincent Hoesch; Michael Lipp	Russia; Victor Fogelson; Oleg Khoperskiy; Vicheslav Kaptyukhin
2013 Cascais	Portugal; Jose Matoso; Gustavo Lima; Frederico Melo	Ukraine; Markus Wieser; Sergey Pughchev; Georgii Leonchuk	Denmark; Jens Christensen; Kim Andersen; Anders Bagger
2014 San Remo	Denmark; Lars Hendriksen; Kleen Frithjof; Anders Bagger	United Arab Emirates; Markus Wieser; Sergey Pughchev; Georgii Leonchuk	United Arab Emirates; Evgeny Braslavetz; Sergey Timokhov; Igor Sodorov
2015 Båstad	United Arab Emirates; Evgeny Braslavetz; Sergey Pughchev; Georgii Leonchuk	United Arab Emirates; Hendrik Witzmann; Theis Palm; Markus Koy	Russia; Anatoly Logonov; Alexander Shalagin; Vadim Statsenko
2016 St. Petersburg	Russia; Anatoly Loginov; Alexander Shalagin; Vadim Statsenko	Germany; Stephan Link; Frank Butzmann; Michael Lipp	Germany; Markus Brennecke; Jochen Schümann; Theis Palm
2017 Thun	Pow Wow (POR); Pedro Andrade; Bernardo Torres Pego; Charles Nankin	Rocknrolla (RUS); Dimitry Samokhin; Andrey Korolyuk; Alexey Bushuev	Bunker Prince (RUS); Yevhen Braslavets; Sergey Pugachev; Sergey Timokhof

== Finn ==
Year	Gold	Silver	Bronze
1956 Loosdrecht	Jürgen Vogler (GDR)	D. Poissant (FRA)	André Nelis (BEL)
1957 Naples	André Nelis (BEL)	Adelchi Pelaschier (ITA)	Jürgen Vogler (GDR)
1958 Lisbon	Adelchi Pelaschier (ITA)	Warburg (NED)	Reist (SUI)
1959 St. Moritz	Jacobus de Jongh (NED)	Pinaud (FRA)	Jürgen Vogler (GDR)
1960 Ostend	Paul Elvstrøm (DEN)	Willi Kuhweide (FRG)	André Nelis (BEL)
1961 Warnemünde	Willi Kuhweide (FRG)	Göran Andersson (SWE)	Walter Gärtner (GDR)
1962 Kiel	Boris Jacobsson (SWE)	Francis Jammes (FRA)	Jan de Long (NED)
1963 Balaton	Boris Jacobsson (SWE)	B. Straubinger (FRG)	B. Andersson (SWE)
1964 Copenhagen	Willi Kuhweide (FRG)	Henning Wind (DEN)	W. Marse (NED)
1965 Cascais	Bernd Dehmel (GDR)	Valentin Mankin (URS)	Willi Kuhweide (FRG)
1966 Attersee	Hubert Raudaschl (AUT)	Jörg Bruder (BRA)	U. Koler (SUI)
1967 Naples	Arwed von Grünewaldt (SWE)	Willi Kuhweide (FRG)	Jürgen Mier (GDR)
1968 Medemblik	Arne Åkerson (SWE)	Henning Wind (DEN)	Uwe Mares (FRG)
1969 Warnemünde	Arne Åkerson (SWE)	Börje Säll (SWE)	Guy Liljegren (SWE)
1970 Dublin	Thomas Lundqvist (SWE)	Guy Liljegren (SWE)	Jürgen Mier (GDR)
1971 Athens	Hans Binkhorst (NED)	Magnus Olin (SWE)	G. Finaczy (HUN)
1972 Medemblik	Christian Schröder (GDR)	Thomas Lundqvist (SWE)	Magnus Olin (SWE)
1973 Władysławowo	Christian Schröder (GDR)	Leonard Gustafsson (SWE)	Jürgen Wolff (GDR)
1974 Niendorf	Guy Liljegren (SWE)	Busquet (FRA)	Ilias Hatzipavlis (GRE)
1975 Palamós	Serge Maury (FRA)	David Howlett (GBR)	Adelchi Pelaschier (ITA)
1976 Port Camargue	Serge Maury (FRA)	Andrey Balashov (URS)	Gus Miller (USA)
1977 Istanbul	Joaquín Blanco (ESP)	Minski Fabris (YUG)	Peter Vollebregt (NED)
1978 Marstrand	Sabena Fabris (YUG)	Joaquín Blanco (ESP)	Jochen Schümann (GDR)
1979 Malcesine	John Bertrand (USA)	Jochen Schümann (GDR)	Kent Carlsson (SWE)
1980 Helsinki	Chris Law (GBR)	John Bertrand (USA)	Andrey Balashov (URS)
1981 Faleron	Lasse Hjortnæs (DEN)	Jørgen Lindhartsen (DEN)	Otto Pohlmann (FRG)
1982 Barcelona	Lasse Hjortnæs (DEN)	Mark Neeleman (NED)	Thomas Schmid (FRG)
1983 Neusiedl	Jochen Schümann (GDR)	Frank Butzmann (GDR)	Lasse Hjortnæs (DEN)
1984 Władysławowo	Michael McIntyre (GBR)	Peter Vilby (DEN)	Jacek Sobkowiak (POL)
1985 Athens	Lasse Hjortnæs (DEN)	Jørgen Lindhartsen (DEN)	Peter Vilby (DEN)
1986 Hyères	Oleg Khopersky (URS)	Johan Hedberg (SWE)	Heiko Birke (GDR)
1987 Skovshoved	Stuart Childerley (GB)	Peter Vilby (DEN)	Otto Brandweg (DEN)
1988 Medemblik	José Luis Doreste (ESP)	Eric Mergenthaler (MEX)	Hans Spitzauer (AUT)
1989 Helsinki	Hans Spitzauer (AUT)	Othmar Müller (SUI)	Lauri Rekkardt (FIN)
1990 Hayling Island	Stig Westergaard (DEN)	Hans Spitzauer (AUT)	Othmar Müller (SUI)
1991 Anzio	Lawrence Lemieux (CAN)	José van der Ploeg (ESP)	Kiko Villalonga (ESP)
1992 Gdańsk	Stuart Childerley (GBR)	Oleg Khopersky (URS)	Dirk Löwe (GER)
1993 L'Estartit	Stig Westergaard (DEN)	José van der Ploeg (ESP)	Hans Spitzauer (AUT)
1994 Çeşme	José van der Ploeg (ESP)	Luca Devoti (ITA)	Fredrik Lööf (SWE)
1995 Balatonduned	José van der Ploeg (ESP)	Fredrik Lööf (SWE)	Philippe Presti (FRA)
1996 L'Hospitalet	José van der Ploeg (ESP)	Mateusz Kusznierewicz (POL)	Sébastien Godefroid (BEL)
1997 Split	Luca Devoti (ITA)	Xavier Rohart (FRA)	Aimilios Papathanasiou (GRE)
1998 Vilamoura	Sébastien Godefroid (BEL)	Michal Maier (CZE)	Iain Percy (GBR)
1999 Ostend	Iain Percy (GBR)	Mateusz Kusznierewicz (POL)	Richard Clarke (CAN)
2000 Palma	Mateusz Kusznierewicz (POL)	Karlo Kuret (CRO)	David Burrows (IRL)
2001 Malcesine	Aimilios Papathanasiou (GRE)	Andrew Simpson (GBR)	Xavier Rohart (FRA)
2002 Çeşme	Ben Ainslie (GBR)	Luca Devoti (ITA)	Karlo Kuret (CRO)
2003 Gothenburg	Ben Ainslie (GBR)	Mateusz Kusznierewicz (POL)	Sébastien Godefroid (BEL)
2004 La Rochelle	Mateusz Kusznierewicz (POL)	Ben Ainslie (GBR)	Guillaume Florent (FRA)
2005 Kalmar	Ben Ainslie (GBR)	Dan Slater (NZL)	Gašper Vinčec (SLO)
2006 Palamós	Edward Wright (GBR)	Guillaume Florent (FRA)	Marin Mišura (CRO)
2007 Balatonföldvár	Eduard Skornyakov (RUS)	Ivan Kljaković Gašpić (CRO)	Aimilios Papathanasiou (GRE)
2008 Scarlino	Ben Ainslie (GBR)	Ivan Kljaković Gašpić (CRO)	Guillaume Florent (FRA)
2009 Varna	Ivan Kljaković Gašpić (CRO)	Tapio Nirkko (FIN)	Edward Wright (GBR)
2010 Split	Ivan Kljaković Gašpić (CRO)	Edward Wright (GBR)	Daniel Birgmark (SWE)
2011 Helsinki	Giles Scott (GBR)	Ivan Kljaković Gašpić (CRO)	Andrew Mills (GBR)
2012 Scarlino	Ioannis Mitakis (GRE)	Vasilij Žbogar (SLO)	Ivan Kljaković Gašpić (CRO)
2013 Warnemünde	Vasilij Žbogar (SLO)	Edward Wright (GBR)	Andrew Murdoch (NZL)
2014 La Rochelle	Giles Scott (GBR)	Vasilij Žbogar (SLO)	Edward Wright (GBR)
2015 Split	Ivan Kljaković Gašpić (CRO)	Josh Junior (NZL)	Vasilij Žbogar (SLO)
2016 Barcelona	Pieter-Jan Postma (NED)	Zsombor Berecz (HUN)	Milan Vujasinović (CRO)
2017 Marseille	Jonathan Lobert (FRA)	Edward Wright (GBR)	Ben Cornish (GBR)
2018 Cádiz	Edward Wright (GBR)	Nicholas Heiner (NED)	Max Salminen (SWE)
2019 Athens	Giles Scott (GBR)	Andy Maloney (NZL)	Zsombor Berecz (HUN)
2020 Gdynia	Zsombor Berecz (HUN)	Giles Scott (GBR)	Joan Cardona (ESP)
2021 Vilamoura	Zsombor Berecz (HUN)	Giles Scott (GBR)	Nils Theuninck (SUI)
2023 Csopak	Domonkos Németh (HUN)	Laurent Haÿ (FRA)	Alessandro Marega (ITA)
2024 Cannes	Alessandro Marega (ITA)	Valérian Lebrun (FRA)	Kristóf Kaiser (HUN)
2025 Naples	Valérian Lebrun (FRA)	Federico Colaninno (ITA)	Deniss Karpak (EST)
2026 Gdynia	Martijn van Muyden (NED)	Valérian Lebrun (FRA)	Peter Peet (NED)

== IQFoil ==
=== Men ===
Year	Location	Gold	Silver	Bronze
2020	Silvaplana	Kiran Badloe (NED)	Sebastian Kördel (GER)	Nicolas Goyard (FRA)
2021	Marseille	Nicolas Goyard (FRA)	Huig-Jan Tak (NED)	Mateus Isaac (BRA)
2022	Torbole	Nicolas Goyard (FRA)	Nicolò Renna (ITA)	Luuc van Opzeeland (NED)
2023	Patras	Nicolò Renna (ITA)	Sebastian Kördel (GER)	Kiran Badloe (NED)
2024	Cagliari	Paweł Tarnowski (POL)	Andy Brown (GBR)	Matthew Barton (GBR)
2025	Sferracavallo	Luuc van Opzeeland (NED)	Nicolas Goyard (FRA)	Finn Hawkins (GBR)
2026	Portimão	Luuc van Opzeeland (NED)	Johan Søe (DEN)	Federico Alan Pilloni (ITA)

=== Women ===
Year	Location	Gold	Silver	Bronze
2020	Silvaplana	Hélène Noesmoen (FRA)	Islay Watson (GBR)	Lilian de Geus (NED)
2021	Marseille	Hélène Noesmoen (FRA)	Islay Watson (GBR)	Shachar Reshef (ISR)
2022	Torbole	Hélène Noesmoen (FRA)	Emma Wilson (GBR)	Maja Dziarnowska (POL)
2023	Patras	Mina Mobekk (NOR)	Sharon Kantor (ISR)	Emma Wilson (GBR)
2024	Cagliari	Daniela Peleg (ISR)	Maya Gysler (NOR)	Anastasiya Valkevich (POL)
2025	Sferracavallo	Daniela Peleg (ISR)	Emma Wilson (GBR)	Maya Gysler (NOR)
2026	Portimão	Tamar Steinberg (ISR)	Shahar Tibi (ISR)	Pilar Lamadrid (ESP)

== J/70 ==
Year	Gold	Silver	Bronze
2016 Kiel	Italy; Claudia Rossi; Matteo Mason; Simone Spangaro; Michele Paoletti	Monaco; Stefano Roberti; Enrico Fonda; Ludovic Broquaire; Filippo Lamantia	Spain; Gonzalo Araújo; Guilherme Almeida; Diego Fructuoso; Nacho Giamonna
2018 Vigo	Italy; Alberto Rossi	Spain; Luis Bugallo	Italy; Umberto de Luca
2021 Charlottenlund	Spain; José María Torcida; Francisco Palacio; Rayco Tabares; Pablo Santurde; Luis Martín Cabiedes	Great Britain; Paul Ward	United States; Michael Goldfarb
2022 Hyères	Great Britain; Jonathan Calascione; James Peters; Morgan Peach; Dave Kohler	United States; Richard Witzel; Carlos Robles; Tomas Dietrich; Bernardo Freitas	Turkey; Ahmet Eker; Burak Zengin; Yaşar Arıbaş; Cem Gözen
2023 Weymouth	United States; Douglas Rastello; Steve Hunt; John Wallace; Morgan Trubovich	Portugal; Vasco Serpa; Paulo Manso; Diogo Pinto; Hugo Rocha	Turkey; Gülboy Güryel; Ali Tezdiker; Massimo Bortoletto; Victor Diaz de Leon
2025 Sandhamn	Portugal; Vasco Serpa; Bernardo Plantier; Afonso Domingos; Hugo Rocha	Spain; Luis Albert; Gerardo Prego; Alejandro Muscat; Manu Weiller	Spain; Luís Martín Cabiedes; Luis Bugallo; Alberto Padrón; Jon Larrazábal
2026 Barcelona	Spain; Món Cañellas; Alberto Guillén; Ricard Castellví; Pol Font	Spain; Javier Padrón; Gustavo del Castillo; Adolfo López; Ricardo Terrades	Portugal; Nuno Espírito Santo; Hugo Rocha; Fran Palacios; Frederico Melo

== Nacra 17 ==
Year	Gold	Silver	Bronze
2013 Dervio	Netherlands; Mandy Mulder; Coen de Koning		
2014 La Grande Motte	Spain; Iker Martínez; Tara Pacheco		
2015 Barcelona	Great Britain; Ben Saxton; Nicola Groves		
2017 Kiel	Italy; Ruggero Tita; Caterina Banti	Spain; Fernando Echávarri; Tara Pacheco	Great Britain; Ben Saxton; Katie Dabson
2018 Gdynia	Italy; Ruggero Tita; Caterina Banti	Spain; Fernando Echávarri; Tara Pacheco	Denmark; CP Lübeck; Lin Cenholt
2019 Weymouth	Great Britain; Ben Saxton; Nicola Boniface	Great Britain; John Gimson; Anna Burnet	Denmark; CP Lübeck; Lin Cenholt
2020 Lake Attersee	Italy; Ruggero Tita; Caterina Banti	France; Quentin Delapierre; Manon Audinet	Italy; Vittorio Bissaro; Maelle Frascari
2021 Thessaloniki	Great Britain; John Gimson; Anna Burnet	Italy; Gianluigi Ugolini; Alice Cialfi	France; Titouan Pétard; Lou Berthomieu
2022 Aarhus	Italy; Ruggero Tita; Caterina Banti	Finland; Sinem Kurtbay; Akseli Keskinen	Italy; Gianluigi Ugolini; Maria Giubilei
2023 Vilamoura	Great Britain; John Gimson; Anna Burnet	Italy; Ruggero Tita; Caterina Banti	Italy; Gianluigi Ugolini; Maria Giubilei
2024 Palermo	Netherlands; Willemijn Offerman; Scipio Houtman	Italy; Gianluigi Ugolini; Maria Giubilei	Belgium; Kwinten Borghijs; Lieselotte Borghijs
2025 Thessaloniki	Great Britain; John Gimson; Anna Burnet	Italy; Gianluigi Ugolini; Maria Giubilei	France; Tim Mourniac; Aloïse Retornaz
2026 Eckernförde	Sweden; Emil Järudd; Hanna Jonsson	Great Britain; John Gimson; Anna Burnet	Netherlands; Willemijn Offerman; Scipio Houtman

== OK ==
Year	Gold	Silver	Bronze
2017 Faaborg	Lars Johan Brodtkorb (Norway)	Charlie Cumbley (Great Britain)	Bo Petersen (Denmark)

== RS:X ==
=== Men ===
Year	Location	Gold	Silver	Bronze
2016	Helsinki	Thomas Goyard (FRA)	Kieran Holmes-Martin (GBR)	Paweł Tarnowski (POL)
2017	Marseille	Louis Giard (FRA)	Byron Kokkalanis (GRE)	Mattia Camboni (ITA)
2018	Sopot	Mattia Camboni (ITA)	Yoav Omer (ISR)	Shahar Tzuberi (ISR)
2019	Mallorca	Kiran Badloe (NED)	Dorian van Rijsselberghe (NED)	Thomas Goyard (FRA)
2020	Vilamoura	Yoav Cohen (ISR)	Shahar Tzuberi (ISR)	Kiran Badloe (NED)
2021	Vilamoura	Kiran Badloe (NED)	Mattia Camboni (ITA)	Ofek Elimelech (ISR)

=== Women ===
Year	Location	Gold	Silver	Bronze
2016	Helsinki	Charline Picon (FRA)	Zofia Noceti-Klepacka (POL)	Stefania Elfutina (RUS)
2017	Marseille	Zofia Noceti-Klepacka (POL)	Stefaniya Elfutina (RUS)	Flavia Tartaglini (ITA)
2018	Sopot	Zofia Noceti-Klepacka (POL)	Stefaniya Elfutina (RUS)	Emma Wilson (GBR)
2019	Mallorca	Lilian de Geus (NED)	Emma Wilson (GBR)	Charline Picon (FRA)
2020	Vilamoura	Charline Picon (FRA)	Katy Spychakov (ISR)	Zofia Noceti-Klepacka (POL)
2021	Vilamoura	Charline Picon (FRA)	Lilian de Geus (NED)	Zofia Noceti-Klepacka (POL)

== Soling ==
Year	Gold	Silver	Bronze
1968; Denmark; Skovshoved	Norway; Per Spilling; Jim Mc Elvin; Dag Blomdal	Netherlands; Geert Bakker; Crew not documented	Denmark; Niels Bolt Jörgensen; Crew not documented
1969; Sweden; Sandhamn	Sweden; Arved von Grünewaldt; Tommy Nilsson; Anders Nordin	Sweden; H. Kellner; Crew not documented	West Germany; Norbert Wagner; Crew not documented
1970; Norway; Hankø	Denmark; Paul Elvstrøm; Poul Mik-Meyer; Jan Kjærulff	Sweden; Arved von Grünewaldt; Tommy Nilsson; Anders Nordin	Sweden; Pelle Petterson; Crew not documented
1971; West Germany; Travemünde	Denmark; Paul Elvstrøm; Flemming Jensen; Valdemar Bandolowski	Soviet Union; Timur Pinegin; Valentin Zamotaykin; Rais Galimov	Denmark; Niels Bolt Jörgensen; Crew not documented
1972; Denmark; Skovshoved	East Germany; Roland Schwarz; Lothar Köpsel; Werner Christoph	United Kingdom; John Oakeley; Charles Reynolds; Barry Dunning	Denmark; Paul Elvstrøm; Niels Jensen; Valdemar Bandolowski
1973; Netherlands; Medemblik	East Germany; Dieter Below; Michael Zachries; Olaf Engelhardt	Austria; Uli Strohschneider; Crew not documented	East Germany; Roland Schwarz; Lothar Köpsel; Werner Christoph
1974; United Kingdom; Firth of Clyde	West Germany; Willi Kuhweide; Karsten Meyer; Axel May	Denmark; Poul Richard Høj Jensen; Crew not documented	East Germany; Roland Schwarz; Lothar Köpsel; Werner Christoph
1975; Italy; Alassio	Sweden; Stig Wennerström; Stefan Krook; Lennart Roslund	East Germany; Roland Schwarz; Lothar Köpsel; Werner Christoph	Italy; Fabio Albarelli; Leopoldo di Martino; Guidotti
1976; Switzerland; Geneva	East Germany; Dieter Below; Michael Zachries; Olaf Engelhardt	Denmark; Poul Richard Høj Jensen; Valdemar Bandolowski; Erik Hermann Hansen	Austria; Herbert Raudaschl; Walter Raudaschl; Rudi Mayer
1977; Greece; Piraeus	West Germany; Fritz Geis; Gerhard Fehlner; Ernst Günter Beck	West Germany; Willi Kuhweide; Axel May; Karsten Meyer	Denmark; Valdemar Bandolowski; Crew not documented
1978; West Germany; Kiel	Canada; Hans Fogh; John Kerr; Dennis Toews	Canada; Glenn Dexter; Andreas Josenhans; Sandy McMillan	East Germany; Dieter Below; Olaf Engelhardt; Michael Zachries
1979; France; La Rochelle	Brazil; Eduardo de Souza; Manfred Kaufman; Thomas Heiman	Netherlands; Geert Bakker; Pieter Keijzer; Harald de Vlaming	Sweden; Arved von Grünewaltdt; Tommy Nilsson; Anders Nordin
1980; Finland; Helsinki	Soviet Union; Boris Budnikov; Nikolay Polyakov; Aleksandr Budnikov	West Germany; Willi Kuhweide; Eckart Loell; Sebastian Ziegelmayer	Denmark; Poul Richard Høj Jensen; Valdemar Bandolowski; Erik Hermann Hansen
1981; Austria; Attersee (lake)	Austria; Michael Farthofer; Christian Holler; Georg Vartian	East Germany; Jörg Hermann; B. Becker; O. Olbrich	West Germany; Fritz Geis; Richard Fricke; Karl Fricke
1982; Denmark; Dragør	Canada; Hans Fogh; John Kerr; Poul Richard Høj Jensen	Soviet Union; Boris Budnikov; Aleksandr Budnikov; Nikolay Polyakov	Soviet Union; Eugenij Kudriavtsev; Crew not documented
1983; Netherlands; Medemblik	Canada; Hans Fogh; John Kerr (sailor); Steve Calder	Soviet Union; Boris Budnikov; Gennadi Strakh; Oleg Miron	East Germany; Helmar Nauck; Norbert Hellriegel; Sven Diedering
1984	Not held due to Olympic Games		
1985; Hungary; Balatonfüred	Norway; Terje Wang; Jørn Petterson; Tom Stian Selander	East Germany; Jochen Schümann; Thomas Flach; Bernd Jäkel	Soviet Union; Georgy Shayduko; Sergej Kanov; Nikolay Polyakov
1986; East Germany; Warnemünde	East Germany; Jochen Schümann; Thomas Flach; Bernd Jäkel	Sweden; Lennart Persson; Eje Öberg; Tony Wallin	Germany; Thomas Jungblut; Thomas Maschkiwitz; Tim Kröger
1987; Sweden; Karlshamn	Soviet Union; Georgy Shayduko; Sergej Kanov; Nikolay Polyakov	East Germany; Jochen Schümann; Thomas Flach; Bernd Jäkel	Canada; Hans Fogh; Steve Calder; Hank Lammens
1988; Italy; Alassio	East Germany; Jochen Schümann; Thomas Flach; Bernd Jäkel	United States; John Kostecki; William Baylis; Bob Billingham	Denmark; Jesper Bank; Jan Mathiassen; Steen Secher
1989; Norway; Oslo	Denmark; Jesper Bank; Jesper Seier; Steen Secher	Soviet Union; Sergey Pichuguin; Gennadi Strakh; Andrei Nikandrov	East Germany; Jochen Schümann; Thomas Flach; Bernd Jäkel
1990; Germany; Prien am Chiemsee	France; Marc Bouet; Alain Pointet; Fabrice Levet	East Germany; Jochen Schümann; Thomas Flach; Bernd Jäkel	Netherlands; Roy Heiner; Ed van der Steene; Yska Minks
1991; France; La Baule	United States; Dave Curtis; Brad Dellenbaugh; Paul Murphy	Sweden; Magnus Holmberg; Björn Alm; Johan Barne	East Germany; Jochen Schümann; Thomas Flach; Bernd Jäkel
1992; Italy; Torbole	Sweden; Per Åhlby; Stefan Nordström; Jan-Olov Sandberg	Austria; Michael Luschan; Stefan Lindner; Georg Stadler	Sweden; Magnus Holmberg; Björn Alm; Johan Barne
1993; Slovenia; Portorose	Germany; Jochen Schümann; Thomas Flach; Bernd Jäkel	Germany; Albert Batzill; Peter Lang; Eddy Eich	Norway; Rune Jacobsen; Erling Landsværk; Thom Haaland
1994; Portugal; Vilamoura	Germany; Jochen Schümann; Thomas Flach; Bernd Jäkel	Denmark; Stig Westergaard; Jens Bojsen-Møller; Bjørn Westergaard	Australia; Ian Walker; Michael Peel; Stephan Jackson
1995; Sweden; Marstrand	Denmark; Jesper Bank; Kræn Nielsen; Thomas Jacobsen	Norway; Herman Horn Johannessen; Paul Davis; Espen Stokkeland	Australia; Cameron Miles; James Mayjor; Chris Links
1996; Hungary; Balatonfüred	Ukraine; Serhiy Pichuhin; Serhiy Khaindrava; Volodymyr Korotkov	Austria; Christian Binder; Franz Fellner; Volker Moser	Hungary; György Wossala; László Kovácsi; Károly Vezér
1997; United Kingdom; Troon	Germany; Jochen Schümann; Gunnar Bahr; Ingo Borkowski	Great Britain; Andy Beadsworth; Barry Parkin; Mason	Norway; Herman Horn Johannessen; Paul Davis; Espen Stokkeland
1998; Slovenia; Izola	Ukraine; Serhiy Pichuhin; Volodymyr Korotkov; Serhiy Timokhov	Russia; Georgy Shayduko; Sergey Voltshkov; S. Kramskoy	Germany; Jochen Schümann; Gunnar Bahr; Ingo Borkowski
1999; Sweden; Sandefjord	Netherlands; Roy Heiner; Peter Van Niekerk; Dirk de Ridder	Ukraine; Serhiy Pichuhin; Volodymyr Korotkov; Serhiy Timokhov	Germany; Jochen Schümann; Gunnar Bahr; Ingo Borkowski
2000; France; La Rochelle	Denmark; Jesper Bank; Henrik Blakskjær; Thomas Jacobsen	Russia; Georgy Shayduko; Oleg Khopyorsky; Andrey Kirilyuk	Ukraine; Serhiy Pichuhin; Volodymyr Korotkov; Serhiy Timokhov
2001; Austria; Attersee (lake)	Austria; Christian Binder; Nicky Fellner; Volker Moser	Germany; Heiko Winkler; Stefan Wenzel; Jens Niemann	Austria; Carl Auteried Jr. Thomas Beclin; Martin Kendler
2002; Italy; Castiglione della Pescaia	Austria; Carl Auteried Jr. Martin Kendler; Thomas Beclin	Austria; Markus Schneeberger; Volker Moser; Christian Panek	Hungary; György Wossala; László Kovácsi; Károly Vezér
2003; Italy; Torbole	Hungary; Gyenese Balázs; Gyula Mónus; Károly Vezér	Germany; Roman Koch; Maxl Koch; Gregor Bornemann	Germany; Karl Haist; Daniel Diesing; Jacob Carsten
2004; Norway; Tonsberg	Austria; Markus Schneeberger; Volker Moser; Christian Panek	Slovenia; Boštjan Antončič; Gennadi Strakh; Zeljko Perovic	Norway; Pål Christoffersen; Karl Book; Espen Kamperhaug
2005; Netherlands; Medemblik	Germany; Roman Koch; Maxl Koch; Gregor Bornemann	Hungary; György Wossala; Pepe Németh; Károly Vezér	Norway; Dag Usterud; Arne Ottestad; Eskil Sønju Le Bruyn Goldeng
2006; Hungary; Balatonfüred	Ukraine; Serhiy Pichuhin; Ivan Chehlatiy; Serhiy Timokhov	Germany; Roman Koch; Maxl Koch; Gregor Bornemann	Austria; Carl Auteried Jr. Udo Moser; Martin Kendler
2007; Norway; Arendal	Slovenia; Boštjan Antončič; Gennadi Strakh; Serhiy Pichuhin	Germany; Thomas Maschkiwitz; Christian Öhler; Kristof Wossala	Argentina; Gustavo Warburg; Maximo Smith; Miguel Lacour
2008; Hungary; Balatonfüred	Hungary; György Wossala; Károly Vezér; Pepe Németh	Germany; Roman Koch; Maxl Koch; Gregor Bornemann	Netherlands; Johan Offermans; Bas Dusee; Dominik Meissner
2009; Italy; Lovere	Germany; Roman Koch; Maxl Koch; Gregor Bornemann	Austria; Carl Auteried Jr. Udo Moser; Martin Kendler	Hungary; György Wossala; Peper Németh; Károly Vezér
2010; France; La Trinite sur Mer	Hungary; György Wossala; Károly Vezér; Pepe Németh	Germany; Roman Koch; Maxl Koch; Gregor Bornemann	Argentina; Gustavo Warburg; Maximo Smith; Hernan Celedoni
2011; Austria; Attersee (lake)	Germany; Uwe Steingross; Karsten Eller; Tim Giesecke	United States; Stuart H. Walker; Georg Stadler; Johannes Spitzk	Austria; Johann Kahls; Christian Kahls; Ronnie Zeiler
2012; Denmark; Arhus	Argentina; Gustavo Warburg; Rodrigo Ferrés; Miguel Lacour	Germany; Karl Haist; Martin Zeileis; Patrick Wichmann	Netherlands; Rudy den Outer; Gavin Lidlow; Ramzi Souli
2013; Italy; Castiglione della Pescaia	Ukraine; Igor Yushko; Serhiy Pichuhin; Dmitriy Yarmolenka	Germany; Roman Koch; Maxl Koch; Gregor Bornemann	United States; Charlie Kamps; Jeremy McMahon; Toby Kamps
2014; Italy; Saint-Pierre-Quiberon	Germany; Uwe Steingross; Karsten Eller; Tim Giesecke	Canada; Peter Hall; Steve Lacey; William Hall	Netherlands; Rudy den Outer; Gavin Lidlow; Ramzi Souli
2015; Germany; Grünau (Berlin)	Germany; Jochen Schümann; Thomas Flach; Ingo Borkowski & Bernd Jäkel (last race)	Hungary; Litkey Farkas; Károly Vezér; Gabor Croszlan	Ukraine; Igor Yushko; Sergey Pichugin; Igor Severianov
2016; Austria; Ebensee am Traunsee	Austria; Christian Binder; Klaus Kratochwill; Christian Feichtinger	Hungary; Litkey Farkas; Joo Kristoff; Gabor Croszlan	Canada; Peter Hall; Steve Lacey; William Hall
2017; Italy; Riva del Garda	Hungary; Litkey Farkas; Károly Vezér; Csaba Weinhardt	Austria; Florian Felzmann; Michael Felzmann; Margund Schuh	Ukraine; Igor Yushko; Serhiy Pichuhin; Igor Severianov
2018; Hungary; Alsóörs	Hungary; Sándor Varjas; László Kovácsi; Gábor Meretei	Hungary; György Wossala; Peter Németh; Christoph Wossala	Hungary; Annamária Sabján; Bea Majoross; András Bajusz
2019; Italy; Torbole	Finland; Eki Heinonen; Gabor Helmhout; Mathias Heinonen	Hungary; Sándor Varjas; László Kovácsi; Gábor Meretei	Austria; Florian Felzmann; Michael Felzmann; Markus Gnan
2020; Germany; Warnemünde	Not held due to COVID-19		
2021; Spain; Santander	Rescheduled and relocated due to COVID-19		
2021; Italy; Mandello del Lario	Netherlands; Rudy den Outer; Theo de Lange; Ramzi Souli	Hungary; Sándor Varjas; László Kovácsi; Gábor Meretei	Hungary; György Wossala; Károly Vezér; Christoph Wossala
2022; Austria; Attersee (lake)	Austria; Florian Felzmann; Stephan Beurle; Michael Felzmann	Hungary; Sándor Varjas; László Kovácsi; Gábor Meretei	Austria; Christian Spiessberger; Max Reisinger; Gerhard Schlipfinger

== Medal table ==
1968 - 2022
Rank	Nation	Gold	Silver	Bronze	Total
1	Germany	8	9	3	20
2	Austria	6	6	6	18
3	Hungary	6	6	5	17
4	East Germany	5	5	6	16
5	Sweden	4	4	3	11
6	Denmark	4	3	4	11
7	Ukraine	4	1	3	8
8	Canada	3	2	2	7
9	Soviet Union	2	4	2	8
10	West Germany	2	2	5	9
11	Netherlands	2	2	4	8
12	Norway	2	1	4	7
13	United States	1	2	1	4
14	Slovenia	1	1	0	2
15	Argentina	1	0	2	3
16	Brazil	1	0	0	1
16	Finland	1	0	0	1
16	France	1	0	0	1
19	Great Britain	0	2	0	2
19	Russia	0	2	0	2
21	Australia	0	0	2	2
22	Italy	0	0	1	1
Totals (22 entries)		54	52	53	159

== Star ==
Year	Gold	Silver	Bronze
1932	Spain; Alberto Aizpurua; E. De Amibilia		
1933	France; Jean Peytel; R. de Bagneux		
1934	Italy; Federico Giannini; Mario Amalfitano		
1935	Italy; Guido Postiglione; Nando Gianturco		
1936	Brazil; Walter von Hütschler; Hans-Joachim Weise		
1937	Germany; Peter Bischoff; Hans-Joachim Weise		
1938	Italy; Agostino Straulino; Nicolò Rode		
1947	Italy; Tito Nordio; Nicolò Rode		
1948	Italy; Adolfo Cosentino; Roberto Morelli		
1949	Italy; Agostino Straulino; Nicolò Rode		
1950	Italy; Agostino Straulino; Nicolò Rode		
1951	Italy; Agostino Straulino; Nicolò Rode		
1952	Italy; Agostino Straulino; Nicolò Rode		
1953	Italy; Agostino Straulino; Nicolò Rode		
1954	Italy; Agostino Straulino; Nicolò Rode		
1955	Italy; Agostino Straulino; Nicolò Rode		
1956	Italy; Agostino Straulino; Nicolò Rode		
1957	Portugal; Joaquim Fiúza; Fernando Brilhante Pessoa		
1958	Espadarte II (POR); Joaquim Fiúza; Fernando Brilhante Pessoa	Candide (FRA); Albert Debarge; Paul Elvstrøm	Noni (POR); A. Correia; H. Oliveira
1959	Merope III (ITA); Agostino Straulino; Carlo Rolandi	Brice (ITA); Rivelli; Marino	Faneca (POR); Duarte Bello; Fernando Bello
1960 Bendor	Frip (FRA); Georges Pisani; Noel-Marcel Desaubliaux	Gam III (FRA); Philippe Chancerel; Michel Parent	Candide (FRA); Albert Debarge; A. de Bokay
1961 Kiel	Candide (FRA); Albert Debarge; Noel Calonne	Bellatrix X (FRG); Bruno Splieth; O. Lampe	Tornado (URS); Timir Pinegin; Fyodor Shutkov
1962 Cascais	Faneca (POR); Duarte Bello; Fernando Bello	Illusion (FRG); Paul Fischer; Kai Krüger	Merope III (ITA); Franco Cavallo; Vincenzo Fania
1963 Marina de Carrara	Unberta V (ITA); Luigi Croce; Luigi Saidelli	Ali Bab VIII (SUI); Hans Bryner; Fredy Portier	Posillipo IV (ITA); A. Cosentino; M. Florenzano
1964	Tornado (URS); Timir Pinegin; Fyodor Shutkov	Veneca (POR); Duarte Bello; Manuel Ricciardi	Mystere (SUI); Bernet; Amrein
1965	Caprice II (ITA); Carlo Rolandi; Alfonso Marino	Bingo (POR); Cte. De Sao Lourenco; Fernando Bello	Ma' Lindo (POR); Mário Quina; Manuel Ricciardi
1966 Varberg	Goldstar (USA); Joseph R. Duplin; Fritz Riess	Taifun (URS); Timir Pinegin; Fyodor Shutkov	North Star (USA); Lowell North; Bernt Larsson
1967 Cascais	Blott IX (SWE); Stig Wennerström; Jan Lybeck	Goldstar (FRG); Fritz Riess; Joseph R. Duplin	Blue Monk (SWE); Börje Larsson; Göran Tell
1968 Naples	Humbug (SWE); Pelle Petterson; Stellan Westerdahl	Krångel (SWE); John Albrechtsson; Ulf Norrman	Dingo (USA); James M. Schoonmaker; Arne Åkerson
1969	Blue Moon (SWE); Börje Larsson; Göran Tell	Blott X (SWE); Stig Wennerström; Sture Christensson	Mingo (GDR); Hartmann Bogumil; H. J. Lange
1970 Sandhamn	Blott X (SWE); Stig Wennerström; Sture Christensson	Buho Blanco (BRA); Jörg Bruder; Thomas Lundqvist	Humburg VII (SWE); Pelle Petterson; Stellan Westerdahl
1971 Cascais	Dingo (USA); James M. Schoonmaker; Thomas Dudinsky	Blott XIII (SWE); Stig Wennerström; Sture Christensson	Sunny (FRG); Wilhelm Kuhweide; Karsten Meyer
1972 Kungsbacka	Humburg XIII (SWE); Pelle Petterson; Stellan Westerdahl	Goldfever (SWE); Sune Carlsson; Bo Wickström	Fiamma (NOR); Odd Roar Lofterød; Bjørn Lofterød
1973	Fiamma (SUI); Oskar Meier; Marcel WunderliI	Subbnboana (FRG); Eckart Wagner; Peter Moeckl	Miistar (POR); Duarte Bello; Fernando Bello
1974 Laredo	Swift (USA); Tom Blackaller; Ron Anderson	Gem (BAH); Durward Knowles; Gerald Ford	Oat Willie (USA); Larry Whipple; James Alexander
1975 Travemünde	Quo Vadis (FRG); Bernd Kuntz; Ekkehardt Nusser	Is Was (FRG); Hans Vogt, Sr. J. Laxganger	Pummel (FRG); Detlef Kuke; Joerg Ricken
1976 Nice	Mustard Seed (USA); Allsopp; Wiler	Mrs. Kula (SWE); Carlsson; Petterson	Blue Moon (SWE); Göran Tell; John Albrehtson
1977 Lago di Garda	United States; James M. Schoonmaker; Josef Steinmayer	West Germany; Geis; Mössnang	Soviet Union; Valentin Mankin; Aleksandr Muzychenko
1978 Medemblik	Austria; Hubert Raudaschl; Karl Ferstl	Sweden; Peter Sundelin; Håkan Lindström	West Germany; Uwe Mares; Wolf Stadler
1979	Soviet Union; Valentin Mankin; Aleksandr Muzychenko	Italy; Flavio Scala; Mauro Testa	Italy; Giorgio Gorla; Alfio Peraboni
1980 La Rochelle	West Germany; Alexander Hagen; Vincent Hösch	Soviet Union; Valentin Mankin; Aleksandr Muzychenko	Italy; Giorgio Gorla; Alfio Peraboni
1981 Balatonfüred	West Germany; Alexander Hagen; Vincent Hösch	Austria; Hubert Raudaschl; Karl Ferstl	Soviet Union; Valentin Mankin; Aleksandr Zybin
1982 Aarhus	Spain; Antonio Gorostegui; José Doreste	West Germany; Alexander Hagen; Vincent Hoesch	Italy; Giorgi Gorla; Alfio Peraboni
1983 Kiel	West Germany; Alexander Hagen; Vincent Hösch	West Germany; Joachim Griese; Michael Marcour	United States; Peter Wright; Todd Cozzens
1984 Palamos	Soviet Union; Guram Biganishvilli; Aleksandr Zybin	West Germany; Peter Wrede; Matthias Borowy	Italy; Albino Fravezzi; Oscar Dalvit
1985 Copenhagen	Italy; Giorgio Gorla; Alfio Peraboni	West Germany; Alexander Hagen; Matthias Borowy	Italy; Albino Fravezzi; Oscar Dalvot
1986 Medemblik	Netherlands; Steven Bakker; Kobus Vandenberg	Italy; Giorgi Gorla; Alfio Peraboni	Austria; Hubert Raudaschl; Franz Kloiber
1987 Thun Lake	United States; Vicente Brun; Hugo Schreiner	United States; Mark Reynolds; Hal Haenel	Austria; Hubert Raudaschl; Stefan Buxkandl
1988 Genoa	United States; Ed Adams; Rich Hennig	United States; Larry Whipple; William Beebe	United States; Bear Hovey; Neil Foley
1989 Travemünde	Brazil; Torben Grael; Marcelo Ferreira	Denmark; Anders Geert Jensen; Mogens Jost	Soviet Union; Victor Soloviev; Aleksandr Zubin
1990 Laredo	Swiss Connection (FRG); Michael Nissen; Gerrit Bartel	Star Nova (SWE); Mats Johansson; Stefan Hemlin	West Germany; Hans Vogt, Jr. Michael Hartmann
1991 Balatonfüred	Brazil; Torben Grael; Marcelo Ferreira	Germany; Alexander Hagen; Kai Falkenthal	Sweden; Mats Johansson; Stefan Hemlin
1992 Hyères	Denmark; Benny Andersen; Mogens Just	Italy; Roberto Benamati; Mario Salani	Ireland; Marc Mansfield; Tom McWilliam
1993 Skodstrup	Denmark; Benny Andersen; Mogens Just	Spain; José Doreste; Javier Hermida	Germany; Joachim Hellmich; Dirk Schwärtzel
1994 Porto Rotondo	Denmark; Michael Hestbæk; Martin Heijsberg	Germany; Alexander Hagen; Kai Falkenthal	United States; Mark Reynolds; Hal Haenel
1995 Cascais	Canada; Ross MacDonald; Eric Jespersen	Italy; Enrico Chieffi; Roberto Sinibaldi	Denmark; Michael Hestbæk; Martin Hejsberg
1996 Medemblik	Denmark; Christian Rasmussen; Kaspar Harsberg	Italy; Silvio Santoni; Sergio Lambertenghi	Norway; Halvor Schoyen; Asmun Tharaldsen
1997 Varberg	United States; Mark Reynolds; Magnus Liljedahl	Germany; Frank Butzmann; Jens Peters	Germany; Alexander Hagen; Haymo Jepsen
1998 Kiel	United States; Mark Reynolds; Magnus Liljedahl	United States; John MacCausland; Phil Trinter	Brazil; Torben Grael; Rodrigo Meireles
1999 Helsinki	Australia; Colin Beahsel; David Giles	Germany; Frank Butzmann; Jens Peters	United States; Mark Reynolds; Magnus Liljedahl
2000 Balatonföldvár	Germany; Vincent Hoesch; Florian Fendt	Austria; Hubert Raudaschl; Herwig Haunschmied	Germany; Huber Merkelbach; Oliver Vitzthum
2001 Skodstrup	Sweden; Fredrik Lööf; Magnus Liljedahl	Denmark; Christian Rasmussen; Peter Oersted	Italy; Riccardo Simoneschi; Ferdinando Colaninno
2002 Genoa	Sweden; Fredrik Lööf; Anders Ekström	United States; Mark Reynolds; Austin Sperry	Lautrup Chemicals (DEN); Niklas Holm; Martin Leifelt
2003 Cascais	Brazil; Torben Grael; Marcelo Ferreira	Netherlands; Mark Neeleman; Peter van Niekerk	Australia; Colin Beashel; David Giles
2004 L'Escala	Sweden; Fredrik Lööf; Anders Ekström	France; Xavier Rohart; Pascal Rambeau	Netherlands; Mark Neeleman; Peter van Niekerk
2005 Ringhals	Great Britain; Iain Percy; Steven Mitchell	Sweden; Fredrik Lööf; Anders Ekström	France; Xavier Rohart; Pascal Rambeau
2006 Neustadt	United States; Mark Mendelblatt; Mark Strube	Brazil; Robert Scheidt; Bruno Prada	United States; Andrew Horton; Brad Nichol
2007 Malcesine	Switzerland; Flavio Marazzi; Enrico De Maria	Sweden; Fredrik Lööf; Anders Ekström	Great Britain; Iain Percy; Andrew Simpson
2008 Balatonföldvár	Germany; Robert Stanjek; Markus Koy	Germany; Matthias Miller; Manuel Voigt	Norway; Eivind Melleby; Petter Mørland Pedersen
2009 Kiel	Brazil; Robert Scheidt; Bruno Prada	Great Britain; Iain Percy; Andrew Simpson	Sweden; Fredrik Lööf; Johan Tillander
2010 Viareggio	Germany; Johannes Polgar; Markus Koy	United States; Andrew Campbell; Brad Nichol	Canada; Richard Clarke; Tyler Bjorn
2011 Dun Laoghaire	Italy; Diego Negri; Enrico Voltolini	Poland; Mateusz Kusznierewicz; Dominik Życki	Canada; Richard Clarke; Tyler Bjorn
2012 Sanremo	BLondynka (POL); Mateusz Kusznierewicz; Dominik Życki	Berg Propulsion (SWE); Fredrik Lööf; Johan Tillander	Team Lode Star (NOR); Eivind Melleby; Petter Mørland Pedersen
2013 Båstad	Italy; Diego Negri; Frithjof Kleen	Sweden; Mats Johansson; Stefan Hemlin	Sweden; Tom Löfstedt; Anders Ekström
2014 Balatonföldvár	Germany; Hubert Merkelbach; Markus Koy	Sweden; Tom Löfstedt; Jesper Sundman	Hungary; Marton Gereben; Peter Gereben
2015 Gaeta	France; Xavier Rohart; Sebastien Guidoux	United States; Augie Diaz; Bruno Prada	Brazil; Torben Grael; Guilherme De Almeida
2016 Warnemünde	Norway; Eivind Melleby; Frithjof Kleen	United States; Augie Diaz; Bruno Prada	Germany; Hubert Merkelbach; Markus Koy
2017 Sanremo	Brazil; Torben Grael; Arthur Lopes	Italy; Diego Negri; Sergio Lambertenghi	United States; Augie Diaz; Bruno Prada

== See also ==
- EUROSAF
