= Star European Championship =

International sailing regatta

The Star European Championships are international sailing regattas in the Star class. The championships are open to sailors of all nationalities.

Most titles have Agostino Straulino and Nicolò Rode, with ten titles each, of whom nine were together.

== Editions ==
Year	City	Country	Dates	Athletes	Nations	Note
1932						
1933						
1934						
1935						
1936						
1937						
1938						
1939						
1940						
1941						
1942						
1943						
1944						
1945						
1946						
1947						
1948						
1949						
1950						
1951						
1952						
1953						
1954						
1955						
1956						
1957						
1958						
1959						
1960						
1961						
1962	Cascais	Portugal				
1963	Marina di Carrara	Italy				
1964						
1965						
1966	Varberg	Sweden				
1967	Cascais	Portugal				
1968	Naples	Italy				
1969						
1970	Sandhamn	Sweden				
1971	Cascais	Portugal				
1972	Kungsbacka	Sweden				
1973						
1974	Laredo	Spain				
1975	Travemünde	West Germany				
1976	Nice	France				
1977	Lake Garda	Italy				
1978	Medemblik	Netherlands				
1979						
1980	La Rochelle	France				
1981	Balatonfüred	Hungary				
1982	Aarhus	Denmark				
1983	Kiel	West Germany				
1984	Palamós	Spain				
1985	Copenhagen	Denmark				
1986	Medemblik	Netherlands				
1987						
1988	Genoa	Italy				
1989	Travemünde	West Germany				
1990	Laredo	Spain	20–28 July			
1991	Balatonfüred	Hungary	23 August – 1 September			
1992	Cádiz	Spain	10–17 May			
1993	Aarhus	Denmark	29 August – 3 September			
1994	Porto Rotondo	Italy	30 May – 3 June			
1995	Cascais	Portugal	24 August – 2 September			
1996	Medemblik	Netherlands	12–20 August			
1997	Varberg	Sweden				
1998	Kiel	Germany	6–14 August			
1999	Helsinki	Finland	1–10 July			
2000	Balatonföldvár	Hungary	1–9 September			
2001	Aarhus	Denmark	29 June – 6 July			
2002	Genoa	Italy	4–11 October			
2003	Cascais	Portugal	1–9 September			
2004	L'Escala	Spain	26–31 March			
2005	Varberg	Sweden	8–13 August			
2006	Hamburg	Germany	7–12 August			
2007	Malcesine	Italy	10–14 September			
2008	Balatonföldvár	Hungary	11–18 June			
2009	Kiel	Germany	6–11 July			
2010	Viareggio	Italy	5–13 June			
2011	Dún Laoghaire	Ireland	3–9 September			
2012	Sanremo	Italy	15–19 April			
2013	Båstad	Sweden	29 July – 3 August			
2014	Brunnen	Switzerland	8–11 June			
2015	Gaeta	Italy	2–7 June			
2016	Warnemünde	Germany	12–17 July			
2017	Sanremo	Italy	25–29 October			

== Medalists ==
Year	Gold	Silver	Bronze
1932	Spain; Alberto Aizpurua; E. De Amibilia		
1933	France; Jean Peytel; R. de Bagneux		
1934	Italy; Federico Giannini; Mario Amalfitano		
1935	Italy; Guido Postiglione; Nando Gianturco		
1936	Brazil; Walter von Hütschler; Hans-Joachim Weise		
1937	Germany; Peter Bischoff; Hans-Joachim Weise		
1938	Italy; Agostino Straulino; Nicolò Rode		
1947	Italy; Tito Nordio; Nicolò Rode		
1948	Italy; Adolfo Cosentino; Roberto Morelli		
1949	Italy; Agostino Straulino; Nicolò Rode		
1950	Italy; Agostino Straulino; Nicolò Rode		
1951	Italy; Agostino Straulino; Nicolò Rode		
1952	Italy; Agostino Straulino; Nicolò Rode		
1953	Italy; Agostino Straulino; Nicolò Rode		
1954	Italy; Agostino Straulino; Nicolò Rode		
1955	Italy; Agostino Straulino; Nicolò Rode		
1956	Italy; Agostino Straulino; Nicolò Rode		
1957	Portugal; Joaquim Fiúza; Fernando Brilhante Pessoa		
1958	Espadarte II (POR); Joaquim Fiúza; Fernando Brilhante Pessoa	Candide (FRA); Albert Debarge; Paul Elvstrøm	Noni (POR); A. Correia; H. Oliveira
1959	Merope III (ITA); Agostino Straulino; Carlo Rolandi	Brice (ITA); Rivelli; Marino	Faneca (POR); Duarte Bello; Fernando Bello
1960 Bendor	Frip (FRA); Georges Pisani; Noel-Marcel Desaubliaux	Gam III (FRA); Philippe Chancerel; Michel Parent	Candide (FRA); Albert Debarge; A. de Bokay
1961 Kiel	Candide (FRA); Albert Debarge; Noel Calonne	Bellatrix X (FRG); Bruno Splieth; O. Lampe	Tornado (URS); Timir Pinegin; Fyodor Shutkov
1962 Cascais	Faneca (POR); Duarte Bello; Fernando Bello	Illusion (FRG); Paul Fischer; Kai Krüger	Merope III (ITA); Franco Cavallo; Vincenzo Fania
1963 Marina de Carrara	Unberta V (ITA); Luigi Croce; Luigi Saidelli	Ali Bab VIII (SUI); Hans Bryner; Fredy Portier	Posillipo IV (ITA); A. Cosentino; M. Florenzano
1964	Tornado (URS); Timir Pinegin; Fyodor Shutkov	Veneca (POR); Duarte Bello; Manuel Ricciardi	Mystere (SUI); Bernet; Amrein
1965	Caprice II (ITA); Carlo Rolandi; Alfonso Marino	Bingo (POR); Cte. De Sao Lourenco; Fernando Bello	Ma' Lindo (POR); Mário Quina; Manuel Ricciardi
1966 Varberg	Goldstar (USA); Joseph R. Duplin; Fritz Riess	Taifun (URS); Timir Pinegin; Fyodor Shutkov	North Star (USA); Lowell North; Bernt Larsson
1967 Cascais	Blott IX (SWE); Stig Wennerström; Jan Lybeck	Goldstar (FRG); Fritz Riess; Joseph R. Duplin	Blue Monk (SWE); Börje Larsson; Göran Tell
1968 Naples	Humbug (SWE); Pelle Petterson; Stellan Westerdahl	Krångel (SWE); John Albrechtsson; Ulf Norrman	Dingo (USA); James M. Schoonmaker; Arne Åkerson
1969	Blue Moon (SWE); Börje Larsson; Göran Tell	Blott X (SWE); Stig Wennerström; Sture Christensson	Mingo (GDR); Hartmann Bogumil; H. J. Lange
1970 Sandhamn	Blott X (SWE); Stig Wennerström; Sture Christensson	Buho Blanco (BRA); Jörg Bruder; Thomas Lundqvist	Humburg VII (SWE); Pelle Petterson; Stellan Westerdahl
1971 Cascais	Dingo (USA); James M. Schoonmaker; Thomas Dudinsky	Blott XIII (SWE); Stig Wennerström; Sture Christensson	Sunny (FRG); Wilhelm Kuhweide; Karsten Meyer
1972 Kungsbacka	Humburg XIII (SWE); Pelle Petterson; Stellan Westerdahl	Goldfever (SWE); Sune Carlsson; Bo Wickström	Fiamma (NOR); Odd Roar Lofterød; Bjørn Lofterød
1973	Fiamma (SUI); Oskar Meier; Marcel WunderliI	Subbnboana (FRG); Eckart Wagner; Peter Moeckl	Miistar (POR); Duarte Bello; Fernando Bello
1974 Laredo	Swift (USA); Tom Blackaller; Ron Anderson	Gem (BAH); Durward Knowles; Gerald Ford	Oat Willie (USA); Larry Whipple; James Alexander
1975 Travemünde	Quo Vadis (FRG); Bernd Kuntz; Ekkehardt Nusser	Is Was (FRG); Hans Vogt, Sr. J. Laxganger	Pummel (FRG); Detlef Kuke; Joerg Ricken
1976 Nice	Mustard Seed (USA); Allsopp; Wiler	Mrs. Kula (SWE); Carlsson; Petterson	Blue Moon (SWE); Göran Tell; John Albrehtson
1977 Lago di Garda	United States; James M. Schoonmaker; Josef Steinmayer	West Germany; Geis; Mössnang	Soviet Union; Valentin Mankin; Aleksandr Muzychenko
1978 Medemblik	Austria; Hubert Raudaschl; Karl Ferstl	Sweden; Peter Sundelin; Håkan Lindström	West Germany; Uwe Mares; Wolf Stadler
1979	Soviet Union; Valentin Mankin; Aleksandr Muzychenko	Italy; Flavio Scala; Mauro Testa	Italy; Giorgio Gorla; Alfio Peraboni
1980 La Rochelle	West Germany; Alexander Hagen; Vincent Hösch	Soviet Union; Valentin Mankin; Aleksandr Muzychenko	Italy; Giorgio Gorla; Alfio Peraboni
1981 Balatonfüred	West Germany; Alexander Hagen; Vincent Hösch	Austria; Hubert Raudaschl; Karl Ferstl	Soviet Union; Valentin Mankin; Aleksandr Zybin
1982 Aarhus	Spain; Antonio Gorostegui; José Doreste	West Germany; Alexander Hagen; Vincent Hoesch	Italy; Giorgi Gorla; Alfio Peraboni
1983 Kiel	West Germany; Alexander Hagen; Vincent Hösch	West Germany; Joachim Griese; Michael Marcour	United States; Peter Wright; Todd Cozzens
1984 Palamos	Soviet Union; Guram Biganishvilli; Aleksandr Zybin	West Germany; Peter Wrede; Matthias Borowy	Italy; Albino Fravezzi; Oscar Dalvit
1985 Copenhagen	Italy; Giorgio Gorla; Alfio Peraboni	West Germany; Alexander Hagen; Matthias Borowy	Italy; Albino Fravezzi; Oscar Dalvot
1986 Medemblik	Netherlands; Steven Bakker; Kobus Vandenberg	Italy; Giorgi Gorla; Alfio Peraboni	Austria; Hubert Raudaschl; Franz Kloiber
1987 Thun Lake	United States; Vicente Brun; Hugo Schreiner	United States; Mark Reynolds; Hal Haenel	Austria; Hubert Raudaschl; Stefan Buxkandl
1988 Genoa	United States; Ed Adams; Rich Hennig	United States; Larry Whipple; William Beebe	United States; Bear Hovey; Neil Foley
1989 Travemünde	Brazil; Torben Grael; Marcelo Ferreira	Denmark; Anders Geert Jensen; Mogens Jost	Soviet Union; Victor Soloviev; Aleksandr Zubin
1990 Laredo	Swiss Connection (FRG); Michael Nissen; Gerrit Bartel	Star Nova (SWE); Mats Johansson; Stefan Hemlin	West Germany; Hans Vogt, Jr. Michael Hartmann
1991 Balatonfüred	Brazil; Torben Grael; Marcelo Ferreira	Germany; Alexander Hagen; Kai Falkenthal	Sweden; Mats Johansson; Stefan Hemlin
1992 Hyères	Denmark; Benny Andersen; Mogens Just	Italy; Roberto Benamati; Mario Salani	Ireland; Marc Mansfield; Tom McWilliam
1993 Skodstrup	Denmark; Benny Andersen; Mogens Just	Spain; José Doreste; Javier Hermida	Germany; Joachim Hellmich; Dirk Schwärtzel
1994 Porto Rotondo	Denmark; Michael Hestbæk; Martin Heijsberg	Germany; Alexander Hagen; Kai Falkenthal	United States; Mark Reynolds; Hal Haenel
1995 Cascais	Canada; Ross MacDonald; Eric Jespersen	Italy; Enrico Chieffi; Roberto Sinibaldi	Denmark; Michael Hestbæk; Martin Hejsberg
1996 Medemblik	Denmark; Christian Rasmussen; Kaspar Harsberg	Italy; Silvio Santoni; Sergio Lambertenghi	Norway; Halvor Schoyen; Asmun Tharaldsen
1997 Varberg	United States; Mark Reynolds; Magnus Liljedahl	Germany; Frank Butzmann; Jens Peters	Germany; Alexander Hagen; Haymo Jepsen
1998 Kiel	United States; Mark Reynolds; Magnus Liljedahl	United States; John MacCausland; Phil Trinter	Brazil; Torben Grael; Rodrigo Meireles
1999 Helsinki	Australia; Colin Beahsel; David Giles	Germany; Frank Butzmann; Jens Peters	United States; Mark Reynolds; Magnus Liljedahl
2000 Balatonföldvár	Germany; Vincent Hoesch; Florian Fendt	Austria; Hubert Raudaschl; Herwig Haunschmied	Germany; Huber Merkelbach; Oliver Vitzthum
2001 Skodstrup	Sweden; Fredrik Lööf; Magnus Liljedahl	Denmark; Christian Rasmussen; Peter Oersted	Italy; Riccardo Simoneschi; Ferdinando Colaninno
2002 Genoa	Sweden; Fredrik Lööf; Anders Ekström	United States; Mark Reynolds; Austin Sperry	Lautrup Chemicals (DEN); Niklas Holm; Martin Leifelt
2003 Cascais	Brazil; Torben Grael; Marcelo Ferreira	Netherlands; Mark Neeleman; Peter van Niekerk	Australia; Colin Beashel; David Giles
2004 L'Escala	Sweden; Fredrik Lööf; Anders Ekström	France; Xavier Rohart; Pascal Rambeau	Netherlands; Mark Neeleman; Peter van Niekerk
2005 Ringhals	Great Britain; Iain Percy; Steven Mitchell	Sweden; Fredrik Lööf; Anders Ekström	France; Xavier Rohart; Pascal Rambeau
2006 Neustadt	United States; Mark Mendelblatt; Mark Strube	Brazil; Robert Scheidt; Bruno Prada	United States; Andrew Horton; Brad Nichol
2007 Malcesine	Switzerland; Flavio Marazzi; Enrico De Maria	Sweden; Fredrik Lööf; Anders Ekström	Great Britain; Iain Percy; Andrew Simpson
2008 Balatonföldvár	Germany; Robert Stanjek; Markus Koy	Germany; Matthias Miller; Manuel Voigt	Norway; Eivind Melleby; Petter Mørland Pedersen
2009 Kiel	Brazil; Robert Scheidt; Bruno Prada	Great Britain; Iain Percy; Andrew Simpson	Sweden; Fredrik Lööf; Johan Tillander
2010 Viareggio	Germany; Johannes Polgar; Markus Koy	United States; Andrew Campbell; Brad Nichol	Canada; Richard Clarke; Tyler Bjorn
2011 Dun Laoghaire	Italy; Diego Negri; Enrico Voltolini	Poland; Mateusz Kusznierewicz; Dominik Życki	Canada; Richard Clarke; Tyler Bjorn
2012 Sanremo	BLondynka (POL); Mateusz Kusznierewicz; Dominik Życki	Berg Propulsion (SWE); Fredrik Lööf; Johan Tillander	Team Lode Star (NOR); Eivind Melleby; Petter Mørland Pedersen
2013 Båstad	Italy; Diego Negri; Frithjof Kleen	Sweden; Mats Johansson; Stefan Hemlin	Sweden; Tom Löfstedt; Anders Ekström
2014 Balatonföldvár	Germany; Hubert Merkelbach; Markus Koy	Sweden; Tom Löfstedt; Jesper Sundman	Hungary; Marton Gereben; Peter Gereben
2015 Gaeta	France; Xavier Rohart; Sebastien Guidoux	United States; Augie Diaz; Bruno Prada	Brazil; Torben Grael; Guilherme De Almeida
2016 Warnemünde	Norway; Eivind Melleby; Frithjof Kleen	United States; Augie Diaz; Bruno Prada	Germany; Hubert Merkelbach; Markus Koy
2017 Sanremo	Brazil; Torben Grael; Arthur Lopes	Italy; Diego Negri; Sergio Lambertenghi	United States; Augie Diaz; Bruno Prada

== See also ==
- Star World Championship
