= Dragon European Championship =

International sailing competition

Dragon European Championship is an annual European sailing regatta in the Dragon class organised by the International Dragon Association.

== Editions ==
Year	City	Country	Dates	Athletes	Nations	Notes
1963	Athens	Greece				
1964	Cannes	France				
1965	Poole	United Kingdom				
1966	Øresund	Denmark				
1967	Le Havre	France				
1968	Helsinki	Finland				
1969	Lake Thun	Switzerland				
1970	Cork	Ireland				
1971	Marstrand	Sweden				
1972	Hyères	France				
1973		Spain				
1974	Medemblik	Netherlands				
1975	Smögen	Sweden				
1976	Tutzing	West Germany				
1977		France				
1978	Torquay	United Kingdom				
1979		Belgium				
1980		West Germany				
1982		Ireland				
1984		Belgium				
1986		Finland				
1988		Denmark				
1990		Netherlands				
1992		Norway				
1994		France				
1995		Norway				
1996		United Kingdom				
1998	Medemblik	Netherlands				
2000	Laredo	Spain	26 June – 2 July			
2002	Lake Thun	Switzerland	15–19 July			
2003	Kinsale	Ireland	15–24 August			
2004	Tallinn	Estonia	28 August – 4 September			
2005	La Trinité-sur-Mer	France	19–26 June			
2007	Hanko	Finland	5–10 August			
2008	Oslo	Norway	31 July – 8 August			
2011	Boltenhagen	Germany	3–8 July			
2012	Attersee	Austria	8–15 June			
2014	Sanremo	Italy	21–28 March			
2015	Båstad	Sweden	31 July – 8 August			
2017	Thun	Switzerland	14–19 August			

== Medalists ==
Year	Gold	Silver	Bronze
1978 Ostend	Netherlands; Ed Frech; Jan Bakker; Steven Vis		
1979			
1980	Austria; C. Scheineker		
1982	West Germany; Markus Glas		
1984	Denmark; Børge Børresen		
1986	West Germany; Markus Glas		
1987	West Germany; Markus Glas		
1988	Denmark; Poul Richard Høj Jensen		
1990	Denmark; Lars Hendriksen		
1992	Denmark; Poul Richard Høj Jensen		
1994	Germany; M. Erhard		
1995	Germany; H. Erich		
1996	Denmark; Poul Richard Høj Jensen		
1998	Netherlands; Fred Imhoff		
2000	Denmark; Poul Richard Høj Jensen		
2002 Thun	Germany; M. Erhard		
2003 Kinsale	Netherlands; Fred Imhoff; Richard van Rij; Rudy den Outer	Switzerland; Vincent Hoesch; Horro Kniffka; Bernd Faber	Denmark; Frank Berg; Soren Kaestel; Mads Christensen
2004 Tallinn	Germany; Harm Muller-Spreer	Denmark; Frank Berg	Germany; Werner Fritz
2005 La Trinité-sur-Mer	Denmark; Claus Høj Jensen	Great Britain; Poul Richard Høj Jensen	France; J. Pasturaud
2006 Cowes	Denmark; Lars Hendriksen		
2007 Hanko	Germany; Markus Wieser; Sergei Pughchev; Thomas Auracher	Germany; Wolfgang Rappel; Hans Jürgen Benze; Michael Lipp	Finland; Henrik Dahlman; Lars Henriksen; Oscar Dannström
2008 Oslo	Russia; Maxim Logutenko; Mikhail Senatorov; Vladimir Krutskih	Russia; Dmitry Berezkin; Igor Goihberg; Alexei Bushhuev	Germany; Thomas Müller; Vincent Hoesch; Maximilian Scheibmeyr
2009 St. Tropez	Ukraine; Markus Wieser; Sergey Pughchev; Matti Paschen	Germany; Markus Glas; Max Glas; Andreas Lohmann	Ukraine; Eugen Braslavets; Sergey Timokov; Michael Hestbek
2010 Balatonkenese	Ukraine; Markus Wieser; Sergey Pughchev; Matti Paschen	Russia; Dmitry Berezkin; Anatoly Kudritskiy; Aleksey Bushuev	Russia; Anatoly Logonov; Andrey Kirilyuk; Alexander Shalagin
2011 Boltenhagen	Denmark; Jens Christensen; Kim Andersen; Anders Bagger	Ukraine; Markus Wieser; Sergey Pughchev; Matti Paschen	Ukraine; Evgeny Braslavetz; Sergey Timokhov; Olexandr Myrchuk
2012 Attersee	Ukraine; Markus Wieser; Sergey Pughchev; Matti Paschen	Germany; Marcus Brennecke; Vincent Hoesch; Michael Lipp	Russia; Victor Fogelson; Oleg Khoperskiy; Vicheslav Kaptyukhin
2013 Cascais	Portugal; Jose Matoso; Gustavo Lima; Frederico Melo	Ukraine; Markus Wieser; Sergey Pughchev; Georgii Leonchuk	Denmark; Jens Christensen; Kim Andersen; Anders Bagger
2014 San Remo	Denmark; Lars Hendriksen; Kleen Frithjof; Anders Bagger	United Arab Emirates; Markus Wieser; Sergey Pughchev; Georgii Leonchuk	United Arab Emirates; Evgeny Braslavetz; Sergey Timokhov; Igor Sodorov
2015 Båstad	United Arab Emirates; Evgeny Braslavetz; Sergey Pughchev; Georgii Leonchuk	United Arab Emirates; Hendrik Witzmann; Theis Palm; Markus Koy	Russia; Anatoly Logonov; Alexander Shalagin; Vadim Statsenko
2016 St. Petersburg	Russia; Anatoly Loginov; Alexander Shalagin; Vadim Statsenko	Germany; Stephan Link; Frank Butzmann; Michael Lipp	Germany; Markus Brennecke; Jochen Schümann; Theis Palm
2017 Thun	Pow Wow (POR); Pedro Andrade; Bernardo Torres Pego; Charles Nankin	Rocknrolla (RUS); Dimitry Samokhin; Andrey Korolyuk; Alexey Bushuev	Bunker Prince (RUS); Yevhen Braslavets; Sergey Pugachev; Sergey Timokhof
