= 1973 Star World Championships =

The 1973 Star World Championships were held in San Diego, United States in 1973.

== Results ==
Results of individual races
Pos	Boat name	Crew	Country	I	II	III	IV	V	VI	Tot
Gold medal	North Star	Lowell North (H); Peter Barrett	United States	2	3	1	2	6	DNF	271
Silver medal	Frolic	Bill Buchan, Jr. (H); Craig Thomas	United States	18	5	4	1	1	7	267
Bronze medal	Streaker	Tom Blackaller (H); Ron Anderson	United States	5	2	5	5	4	DNF	264
4	Gem XI	Durward Knowles (H); James Allsopp	Bahamas	4	4	9	9	5	DNF	254
5	Spirit III	Alan C. Holt (H); Richard Gates	United States	13	6	11	3	7	DNF	245
6	Oat Willie	Larry Whipple (H); James Alexander	United States	9	8	7	8	8	DNF	245
7	Solution	Robbie Haines (H); Ed Trevelyan	United States	7	9	10	14	18	3	242
8	Humbug XV	Pelle Petterson (H); Stellan Westerdahl	Sweden	15	10	20	12	3	4	241
9	Menace	Dennis Conner (H); James Reynolds	United States	6	1	18	7	14	23	239
10	Tranquil	John W. Bennett (H); Kim Fletcher	United States	21	7	22	4	13	11	229
11	Sanctuary	Malin Burnham (H); John Burnham	United States	12	20	35	18	2	13	220
12	Rats	Evan Dailey (H); Michael Cooper	United States	DNF	22	13	10	22	1	217
13	Glory	Barton S. Beek (H); Charles Beek	United States	10	21	3	19	23	16	216
14	Last Chance	Jay C. Winberg (H); Lee Huntsman	United States	34	12	8	6	9	DNF	216
15	Aquarius	S. Prinsenberg (H); Dirk Prinsenberg	Canada	11	18	40	17	26	2	211
16	Mahayana	Tryg Liljestrand (H); P. J. Svanfeldt	United States	8	16	27	11	16	DNF	207
17	Lucky Liz	Eckart Wagner (H); Peter Moeckl	West Germany	22	15	6	20	17	DNF	205
18	Spirit	J. M. MacCausland (H); George Szabo, Jr.	United States	3	17	30	40	25	5	205
19	Mustard Seed	Charles Morgan (H); John Winters	United States	30	23	23	13	10	24	192
20	Good Grief	Börje Larsson (H); Göran Tell	Sweden	43	27	14	16	19	21	188
21	Riot IV	Henry M. Rowan (H); Rick Burgess	United States	1	11	36	31	24	DNF	182
22	Ragamuffin	William Parks (H); William Wright	United States	14	32	12	23	32	DNF	172
23	Follow Me	Joseph M. Ellis (H); John Kolius	United States	42	24	19	15	15	DNF	170
24	Misty	John W. Allen (H); John Allen, Jr.	United States	45	33	21	29	33	6	163
25	Hannah	Herbert Mettig (H); Karl Ferstl	Austria	47	38	33	26	12	14	162
26	Gusto	Duarte de Almeida Bello (H); Duke Robinson	Portugal	37	14	15	30	27	DNF	162
27	Merlin	Adrian Bryner (H); Hans Bryner	Switzerland	27	45	17	47	40	8	148
28	Squid	Jeffrey Aldred (H); Chris Latham	United States	17	29	34	45	39	19	147
29	Fiamma	Oskar A. Meier (H); Marcel Wunderli	Switzerland	19	28	24	DNF	11	DNF	146
30	Star Trek	Bradford Alford (H); Douglas Graf	United States	DNF	13	25	27	20	DNF	143
31	Eagle	William J. Hock (H); Ronald S. Toft	Australia	44	26	32	28	DNF	12	143
32	Good News	William Cowles (H); Ross F. Wood	United States	25	34	29	25	31	DNF	141
33	Rain Drop	Thomas C. Nylund (H); Thomas Hayes	United States	32	21	48	37	36	15	134
34	Is Was	Hans Vogt, Sr. (H); Fritz Geis	West Germany	39	19	16	21	DNF	DNF	133
35	Liberty	Eduardo de Souza (H); Peter Ficker	Brazil	38	37	28	24	28	DNF	130
36	Flame	Heinz Maurer (H); W. Meier	Switzerland	DNF	25	26	22	29	DNF	126
37	Jaguar	Klaus Kappes (H); Rainer Flothman	West Germany	20	30	38	34	37	DNF	126
38	Something Else	David Peterson (H); William Kreysler	United States	26	DNS	2	DNF	21	DNF	122
39	Deja Vu	Robert J. Smith (H); Theodore Smith	Australia	33	49	55	33	41	9	120
40	Tenacious	Ernesto Armitano (H); Carlos Bayo	Venezuela	51	40	49	32	35	17	112
41	Griffin	Kurt Mueller (H); Heinz Roethlin	Switzerland	24	50	37	35	38	DNF	101
42	Fiorella	John Heywood (H); Norman Allyn	Canada	DNF	35	44	39	DNF	10	100
43	Wind Machine	Thomas Dudinsky (H); Doug Sheppard	United States	36	39	50	36	30	DNF	94
44	Vasa II	Ch. Breitenstein (H); August Weiss	Switzerland	23	48	31	46	44	DNF	93
45	Restless	William Kieser, Jr. (H); Bruce German	United States	35	52	43	50	46	20	91
46	Roberta	Davide Sigurta (H); Marco Colombo	Italy	29	44	47	41	34	DNF	90
47	Sparkle	Cyrill Dvorak (H); Beat Schmuck	Switzerland	16	41	52	48	42	DNF	86
48	Menace	Arno Gudrat (H); Manfred Joppich	West Germany	28	42	39	43	DNS	DNF	76
49	Juggernaut	Mario Caprile (H); Felipe I. Liron	Spain	31	43	54	38	45	DNF	74
50	Frost Free	John McGann (H); Paul Powers	United States	48	DSQ	46	44	DNF	18	72
51	Feather II	Kurt Gaggi (H); Adolf Eder	Austria	40	36	45	42	DNS	DNF	65
52	Griffin	Frank D. Miller (H); Eleanor Miller	United States	49	53	53	49	DNF	22	59
53	Haleakala	Uwe von Below (H); Robert Anderson	West Germany	41	46	42	DNF	DNS	DNF	42
54	Solid Gold	David Millar (H); Phil Noren	Canada	46	47	51	DNF	43	DNF	41
55	Zucker Kaninchen	Werner Lambeck (H); Klaus Peinze	West Germany	50	51	41	DNF	DNS	DNF	29
56	Noval	Norman Kasch (H); John Amato	United States	52	54	56	51	47	DNS	25

Legend: DNF – Did not finish; DNS – Did not start; DSQ – Disqualified; WDR – Withdrew;
