= Zybin =

Zybin (Russian: Зыбин) is a Russian masculine surname, its feminine counterpart is Zybina. Notable people with the surname include:

- Aleksandr Zybin (1951–2010), Russian Olympic sailor
- Galina Zybina (born 1931), Russian former track and field athlete and coach
