= Norbert Wagner =

Norbert Wagner may refer to:

- Norbert Wagner (philologist) (born 1929), German philologist
- Norbert Wagner (sailor) (born 1935), German sailor
