= Börje Larsson =

Börje Larsson may refer to:

- Börje Larsson (sailor)
- Börje Larsson (director)
