= Vered Buskila =

Israeli sailor (born 1983)

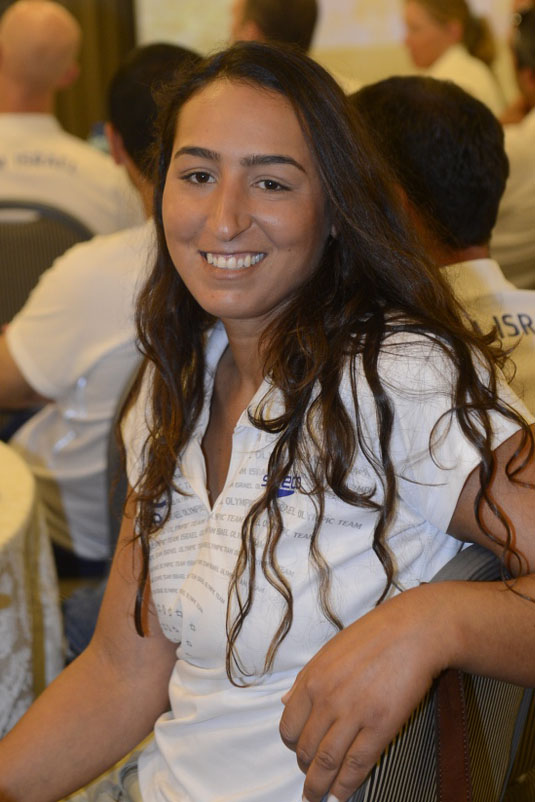
- Vered Buskila

Personal information
- Native name: ורד בוסקילה
- Nickname: Vardush
- Born: 23 May 1983 (age 43) Bat Yam, Israel

Sport
- Country: Israel
- Sport: Sailing
- Event: Women's 420; Women's 470 Class Two-Person Dinghy
- Club: Hapoel Tel Aviv
- Coached by: Ilan Basik Tashtash

Vered Bouskila (Hebrew: ורד בוסקילה; born 23 May 1983) is an Israeli Olympic sailor. She competes in the 470 Class double-handed monohull planing dinghy with a centerboard, Bermuda rig, and center sheeting. She won a world championship in the women's 420 at the age of 15, and a bronze medal in the world championships in the 470 six years later.

== Biography ==
Buskila is Jewish and was born in Bat Yam, Israel. She studied law and political science at the Interdisciplinary Center, Herzliya, in Israel.

=== Sailing career ===
She learned to sail with the Maccabi Zevelun Club in Bat Yam. She sails now for Hapoel Tel Aviv.

In 1998, at the age of 15, she partnered with Limor Kliger, 16, and won the women's world 420 yachting championship in the Gulf of Corinth in Greece. They defeated 47 other teams, from 16 countries.

In 2000, she partnered with Nike Kornecki, and in 2001 they won a bronze medal at the European Championships in Ireland. In 2004, they won bronze medals in both the European Championship in Germany and the 470 World Championship in Zadar, Croatia.

Buskila competed on behalf of Israel at the 2004 Summer Olympics in Athens, Greece, in the Women's 470 Class Two-Person Dinghy with Kornecki, and came in 18th. They won a silver medal in the 2005 European Championship.

She competed on behalf of Israel at the 2008 Summer Olympics in Beijing, China, in the Women's 470 Class Two-Person Dinghy with Kornecki, and came in fourth.

Buskila returned to sailing with a new partner, Gil Cohen, in 2010.

On 24 December 2012 Vered Buskila announced her retirement, telling the First Channel TV News: "It would be very painful for me to see the opening ceremony of the next Olympic Games, in which I will not be taking part - but one must know when to stop". She disclosed that, having studied Law concurrently with her sailing activity, she intends to have a new career as a lawyer.

== See also ==
- Sports in Israel
- List of European Championships medalists in sailing
