= Luigi Saidelli =

Italian sailor (1939–2023)

- Born: 12 January 1939; Trieste, Italy
- Died: 4 November 2023 (aged 84); Genoa, Italy
- Occupation: Sailor

Luigi Saidelli (12 January 1939 – 4 November 2023) was an Italian sailor and sailboat racer who competed in the 1964 Summer Olympics.

== Life and career ==
Born in Trieste into a family of Istrian–Dalmatian origins, Saidelli was the son and grandson of naval officers. Graduated in Economics from the University of Genoa, in 1963 he won the Star European Championship together with Luigi Croce. One year later, they entered the 1964 Summer Olympics, but while they were leading the race, the breakage of a seal pin prejudiced their victory.

Saidelli competed until the age of 48. After his retirement, he ran a shipping agency active in Genoa and Savona. He died for the consequences of pulmonary emphysema on 4 November 2023, at the age of 84.

An Italian-language biography written by journalist and historian Bruno Cianci, entitled 'Il senso della rotta' (ISBN 9788865945988), traces the sailor's long life in details.
