= Nike Kornecki =

Israeli sailor

Personal information
- Native name: נייקי קורנצקי
- Born: August 18, 1982 (age 43) Italy
- Height: 5 ft 4 in (163 cm)
- Weight: 110 lb (50 kg)

Sport
- Country: Israel
- Sport: sailing
- Event: Women's 470 Class Two-Person Dinghy

Nike Kornecki (Hebrew: נייקי קורנצקי; born August 18, 1982) is an Israeli Olympic sailor, and competes in the 470 Class double-handed monohull planing dinghy with a centerboard, Bermuda rig, and center sheeting. In 2004, she won a bronze medal in the world championships in the 470.

== Biography ==
Kornecki is Jewish, and was born in Italy.

=== Sailing career ===
In 2000, she partnered with Vered Buskila, and in 2001 they won a bronze medal at the European Championships in Ireland. In 2004, they won bronze medals in both the European Championship in Germany and the 470 World Championship in Zadar, Croatia.

They competed on behalf of Israel at the 2004 Summer Olympics in Athens, Greece, in the Women's 470 Class Two-Person Dinghy, and came in 18th. They won a silver medal in the 2005 European Championship.

They competed on behalf of Israel at the 2008 Summer Olympics in Beijing, China, in the Women's 470 Class Two-Person Dinghy, and came in fourth.

== See also ==
- List of European Championships medalists in sailing
