= Sture Christensson =

Swedish sailor

Sture Christensson is a Swedish former sailor in the Star class. He won the 1970 Star European Championships crewing for Stig Wennerström.
