= Uwe Mares =

German sailor (born 1942)

Uwe Mares (German pronunciation: [ˈuːvə ˈmaːʁə], born 8 May 1942 in Hamburg) is a German sailor. He finished fourth at the 1976 Summer Olympics in the Tempest class with Wolf Stadler.
