= Henny Vegter =

Dutch sailor (born 1958)

Personal information
- Full name: Pieternella Hendrika Vegter
- Nationality: Dutch
- Born: 28 February 1958 (age 68) Rotterdam, Netherlands
- Height: 1.67 m (5.5 ft)

Sailing career
- Sport: Sailing
- Club: Rotterdamsche Zeilvereeniging
- Class: 470
Competition record
Representing Netherlands
Olympic Games
4th	1988 Pusan	470 Female
- Updated on 26 February 2014

Pieternella Hendrika "Henny" Vegter (born 28 February 1958 in Rotterdam) is a sailor from the Netherlands, who represented her country at the 1988 Summer Olympics in Pusan. With Marion Bultman as crew, Vegter took the 13th place in the 470 Female. Vegter and Bultman were, with the exception of Mej. C. de Visser – substitute for the Star in 1936 –, the first female sailing competitors in the 88 years of Dutch Olympic sailing history.
