= Marion Bultman =

Dutch sailor (born 1960)

Personal information
- Full name: Marion Alette Bultman
- Nationality: Dutch
- Born: 16 February 1960 (age 66) Oosterbeek, Netherlands
- Height: 1.79 m (5.9 ft)

Sailing career
- Sport: Sailing
- Class: 470
Competition record
Representing Netherlands
Olympic Games
1988 Pusan	470 Female
- Updated on 2014-01-10

Marion Alette Bultman (born 16 February 1960 in Oosterbeek) is a sailor from the Netherlands, who represented her country at the 1988 Summer Olympics in Pusan. With Henny Vegter as Helmsman, Bultman took the 13th place in the 470 Female. Bultman and Vegter were, with the exception of Mej. C. de Visser – substitute for the Star in 1936 –, the first female sailing competitors in the 88 years of Dutch Olympic sailing history.

== Sources ==
- "Marion Bultman Bio, Stats, and Results". Olympic Sports. Sports-Reference.com. Archived from the original on 2020-04-18.
- "De Nederlandse olympische zeilploeg". De Telegraaf (in Dutch). 1988-09-10.
- "Nederlandse zeilploeg met lege handen naar huis". De Telegraaf (in Dutch). 1988-09-28.
- Official Report, Volume 1: Organization and Planning (PDF). Seoul: Olympic Organizing Committee. 1989. Archived from the original (PDF) on March 4, 2016.
- Official Report, Volume 2: Competition, Summary and Results (PDF). Seoul: Seoul Olympic Organizing Committee. 1989. Archived from the original (PDF) on October 7, 2013.
