= Tyler Bjorn =

Canadian yacht racer

Tyler Bjorn (born 13 March 1970 in Montreal) is a Canadian former yacht racer who competed in the 2012 Summer Olympics, sailing as crew for helmsman Richard Clarke in the two-man Star keelboat class. In recent years, he has spent his time coaching sailing prospects.
