= Austin Sperry =

American sailor (born 1978)

Austin Sperry (born 11 May 1978 in Oakland, California) is an American sailor and together with John Dane III was the winner of the 2007 U.S. Olympic Trials, securing their place in Sailing at the 2008 Summer Olympics – Star class. Sperry was coached by Hans Wallén (Star Silver, Sweden '96), Steve Erickson (Star Gold, USA '84) and Rodney Hagebols.
