= Tom Löfstedt =

Swedish sailor (born 1954)

Tom Arvid Paul Löfstedt
Personal information
- Nationality: Swedish
- Born: 18 May 1954 (age 72) Stockholm, Sweden

Sailing career
- Sport: Sailing
- Class(es): Star, J/70, Dragon

Tom Arvid Paul Löfstedt (born 18 May 1954 in Stockholm) is a Swedish sailor. He has won multiple Swedish championships, placed second at the European championships, and in 2004 won the Dragon 75th Anniversary Regatta. He mostly sails Star and J/70 classes.

== Merits ==
Merits as helmsman in official championships between 1969-1984 and 2002–present:

- 19 Gold in the Swedish Championships
- 6 Gold in the Nordic Championships
- 2 Silver in the World Championships
- 1 Silver in the European Championships
- 2 Bronze in the European Championships
