= Benny F. Andersen =

Danish sailor

Benny Fomsgaard Andersen (born 1 June 1963 in Ringkøbing) is a Danish Olympic Star class sailor. He finished ninth in the 1992 Summer Olympics together with Mogens Just Mikkelsen.
