= Dmitry Berezkin =

Russian sailor

Personal information
- Nationality: Russian
- Born: 10 February 1963 (age 63) Moscow, Russia

Sport
- Sport: Sailing

Dmitry Berezkin (Russian: Дмитрий Березкин; born 10 February 1963) is a Russian sailor. He competed at the 1992, 1996, 2000, and the 2004 Summer Olympics.
