= Thomas Lundqvist (sailor) =

Swedish sailor

Thomas Lundqvist (born 5 April 1947 in New York) is a Swedish Olympic sailor in the Finn class. He finished 5th in Finn in the 1972 Summer Olympics.
