= La Trinité-sur-Mer =

La Trinité-sur-Mer An Drinded-Karnag (Breton)
- Commune
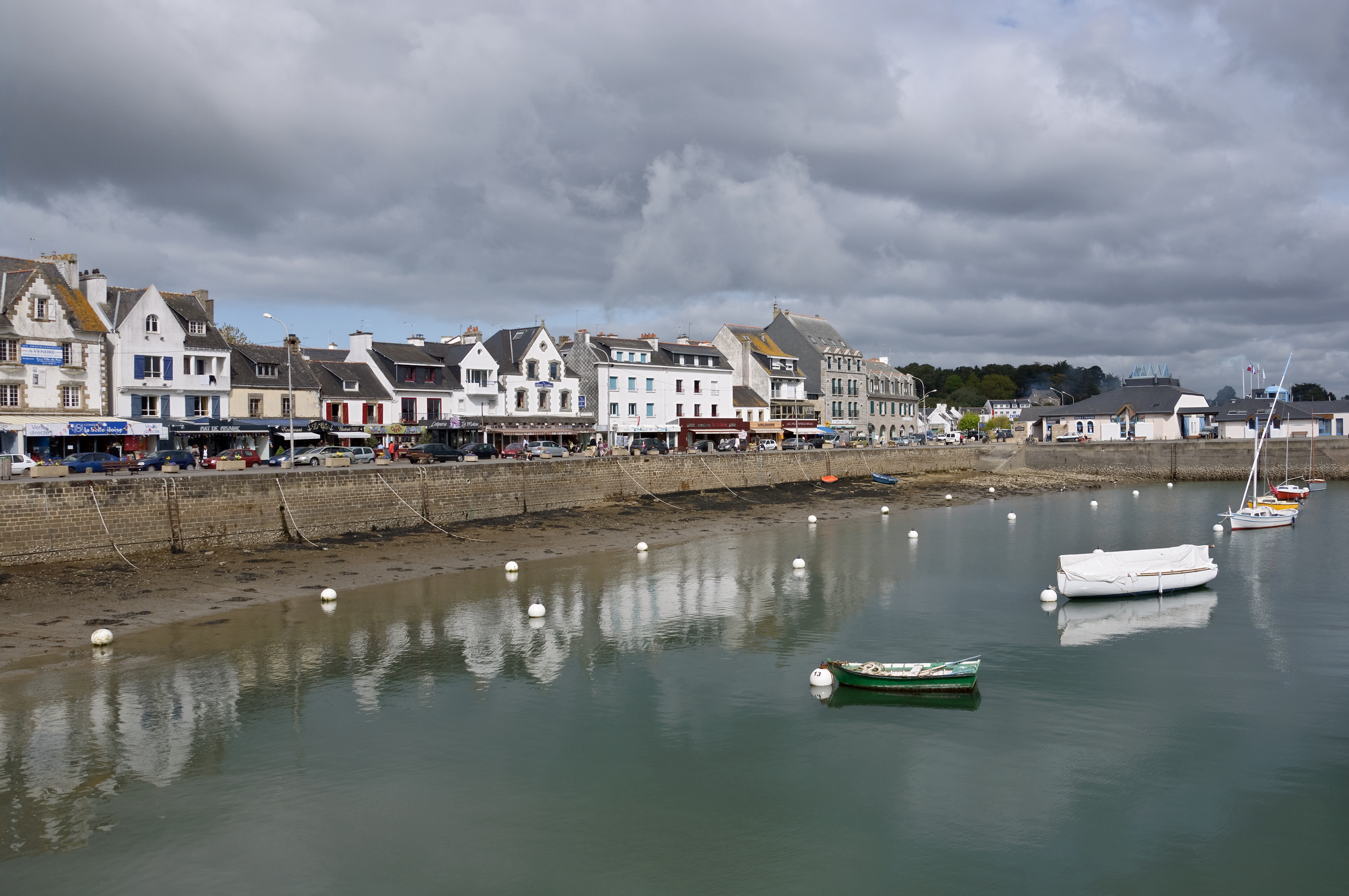
- La Trinité-sur-Mer

- Coat of arms
- Location of La Trinité-sur-Mer
- Location within France Location within Brittany
- Coordinates: 47°35′10″N 3°01′42″W
- Country: France
- Region: Brittany
- Department: Morbihan
- Arrondissement: Lorient
- Canton: Quiberon
- Intercommunality: Auray Quiberon Terre Atlantique

Government
  - Mayor (2026–32): Yves Normand
- Area^{1}: 6.20 km^{2} (2.39 sq mi)
- Highest elevation: 31 m (102 ft)
- Lowest elevation: 0 m (0 ft)
- Population (2023): 1,845
  - Density: 298/km^{2} (771/sq mi)
- Time zone: UTC+01:00 (CET)
  - Summer (DST): UTC+02:00 (CEST)
- INSEE/Postal code: 56258 /56470
- ^{1} French Land Register data, which excludes lakes, ponds, glaciers > 1 km^{2} (0.386 sq mi or 247 acres) and river estuaries.

La Trinité-sur-Mer (French pronunciation: [la tʁinite syʁ mɛʁ]; Breton: An Drinded-Karnag) is a commune in the Morbihan department in Brittany, in north-western France. Inhabitants of La Trinité-sur-Mer are called Trinitains.

It is located east of Carnac. The town is primarily a port, with a seaside quay dotted by numerous seafood restaurants. The town is also known for its watersport competitions.

Separated from the well known commune of Carnac in 1864, several of the famous neolithic standing stones in the Carnac stones fall within its boundaries, including the dolmens of Kerdeneven and Kermarquer, and the Petit Ménec Alignments.

== Landmarks ==
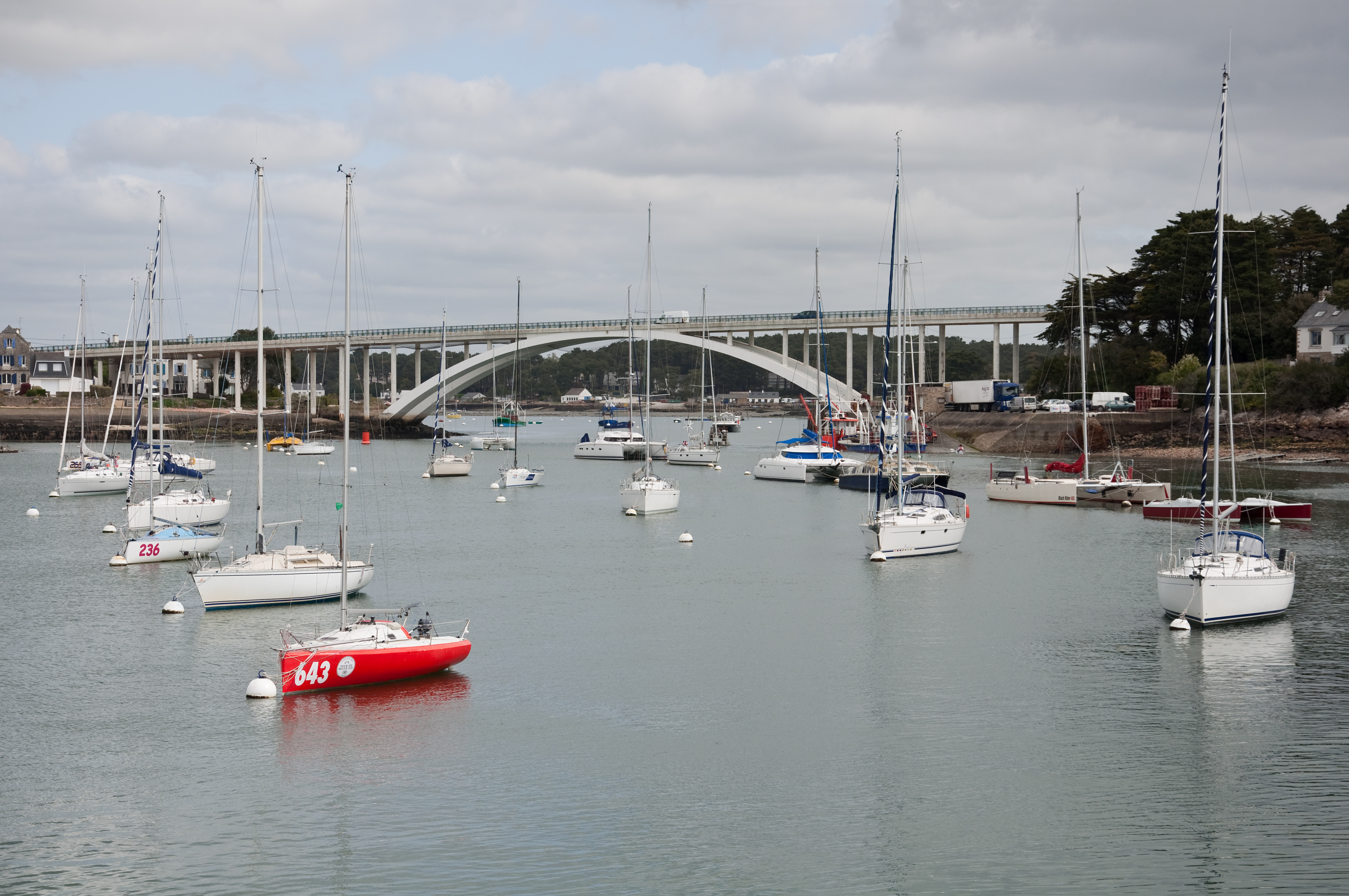
'Pont de Kerisper' (Kerisper bridge)

The Pont de Kerisper connects the commune to the neighbouring Saint-Philibert. The current bridge is a replacement, built in 1956, of the previous bridge which was destroyed by German bombing.

== Demography ==
Historical population
Year	Pop.	±% p.a.
1968	1,530	—
1975	1,404	−1.22%
1982	1,477	+0.73%
1990	1,433	−0.38%
1999	1,530	+0.73%
2007	1,612	+0.65%
2012	1,635	+0.28%
2017	1,610	−0.31%
2023	1,845	+2.30%
Source: INSEE

== Notable residents ==
- Alain Barrière (1935–2019), singer
- Jean-Marie Le Pen (1928–2025), politician
- Marine Le Pen (born 1968), politician

== Events ==
- The 2008 Sywoc (Student Yachting World Cup) took place in La Trinité-sur-Mer (25 October – 1 November 2008).

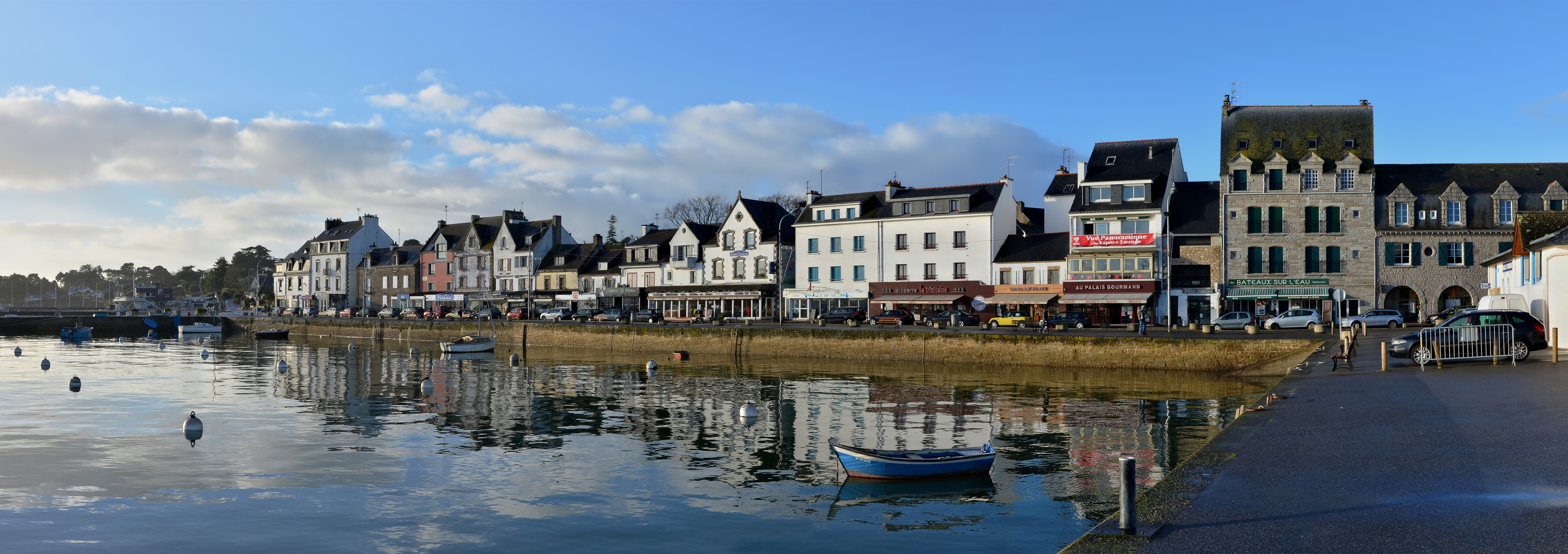
Sea front as seen from the marina

- The 2010 European Championship Soling took place in La Trinité-sur-Mer from 28 AUG till 3 SEP.

== See also ==
- Communes of the Morbihan department
