= Manuel Ricciardi =

Italian footballer (born 2000)

Personal information
- Date of birth: 17 April 2000 (age 26)
- Place of birth: Rome, Italy
- Height: 1.84 m (6 ft 0 in)
- Position: Right-back

Team information
- Current team: Juve Stabia
- Number: 2

Youth career
- Ascoli Calcio

Senior career*
Years	Team	Apps	(Gls)
2019–2022	Ascoli Calcio	0	(0)
2019–2020	→ Fano (loan)	7	(0)
2020–2022	→ Legnago Salus (loan)	65	(2)
2022–2024	Avellino	56	(4)
2024–2026	Cosenza	52	(11)
2026	→ Juve Stabia (loan)	15	(0)
2026–	Juve Stabia	0	(0)
- * Club domestic league appearances and goals as of 10 May 2026

Manuel Ricciardi (born 17 April 2000) is an Italian professional footballer who plays as a right-back for Serie B club Juve Stabia.

== Club career ==
Born in Rome, Ricciardi was formed in Ascoli Calcio youth system.

On 31 July 2019, he was loaned to Serie C club Fano, and made his professional debut on 20 October 2019 against Carpi.

For the next season, on 10 September 2020 the defender was loaned to Legnago Salus. The loan was extended the next year.

On 12 July 2022 he joined Avellino on permanent basis.

On 13 August 2024 he joined Serie B side Cosenza.

On 30 January 2026, Ricciardi moved on loan to Juve Stabia, with a conditional obligation to buy.
