= Enrico Chieffi =

Italian yacht racer

Enrico Chieffi (born 11 April 1963) is an Italian former yacht racer who competed in the 1984 Summer Olympics and in the 1996 Summer Olympics.

Chieffi was the navigator for Il Moro Challenge at the 1992 Louis Vuitton Cup. At the 2000 Louis Vuitton Cup, he sailed with the Swiss FAST 2000 challenge.
