= Jens Christensen (sailor) =

Danish sailor (born 1953)

Personal information
- Nationality: Danish
- Born: 18 December 1953 (age 72) Copenhagen, Denmark

Sport
- Sport: Sailing

Jens Christensen (born 18 December 1953) is a Danish sailor. He competed in the Star event at the 1980 Summer Olympics.
