= Michel Parent =

French sailor 1924–2003

Michel Parent (19 June 1924 – 30 September 2003) was a French sailor who competed in the 1956 Summer Olympics.

Michel Georges Parent was born on 19 June 1924 in Sedan. He died on 30 September 2003 in Montpellier.
