= Nicklas Holm =

Danish sailor

Personal information
- Full name: Nicklas David Holm
- Nationality: Danish
- Born: 8 March 1981 (age 45) Copenhagen, Denmark
- Height: 190 cm (6 ft 3 in)
- Weight: 91 kg (201 lb)

Sailing career
- Sport: Sailing
- Club: Royal Danish Yacht Club
- Classes: Star, Optimist, Yngling, Soling, Dragon

Nicklas David Holm (born 8 March 1981) is a Danish corporate finance advisor and Partner at PwC Corporate Finance, and he is a Danish former Olympic Star class sailor. Together with Claus Olesen, he finished 9th in the 2004 Summer Olympics – Star class event.

Nicklas was named Danish Sailor of the Year in 2002 by the Danish Sailing Federation after among other winning the bronze medal in the Olympic Star class at the 2002 Star European Championships in Genoa, Italy.

Among his sailing achievements are winning the silver medal at the 1994 Optimist Team World Championships and finishing 4th in the 1994 Individual Optimist World Championships, and winning the gold medal at the 1994 Danish Optimist National Championships.

In 1995 Mr. Holm became the first Dane to win the world's largest dinghy regatta by winning the International Garda Optimist Meeting in Riva Del Garda, Italy against more than 500 other sailors.

In 1999 he won the bronze medal at the Yngling World Championships and was asked by Olympic Gold Medalist Jesper Bank to skipper the Danish Soling at the 1999 Pre-Olympics in Sydney, Australia and finished 9th.

He has acted as tactician in the TP52 class, Farr40 class, Maxi class and Maxi Swan class competing in several World Championships.

By 2007 Mr. Holm at the age of 26 retired from professional sailing and began actively pursuing a career as an Investment Banker.

Mr. Holm has studied at Copenhagen Business School graduating with a Ms.C in Finance and Accounting and completing parts of his studies at Harvard University in Boston, USA.

In 2017 he finished 3rd at the Dragon Gold Cup in Hornbæk, Denmark.
