= Mogens Just Mikkelsen =

Danish sailor (born 1962)

Mogens Just Mikkelsen (born 23 October 1962 in Bogense) is a Danish Olympic Star class sailor. He competed in the 1988 and 1992 Summer Olympics, finishing 9th in 1992 together with Benny F. Andersen.
