= Attersee am Attersee =

- Municipality
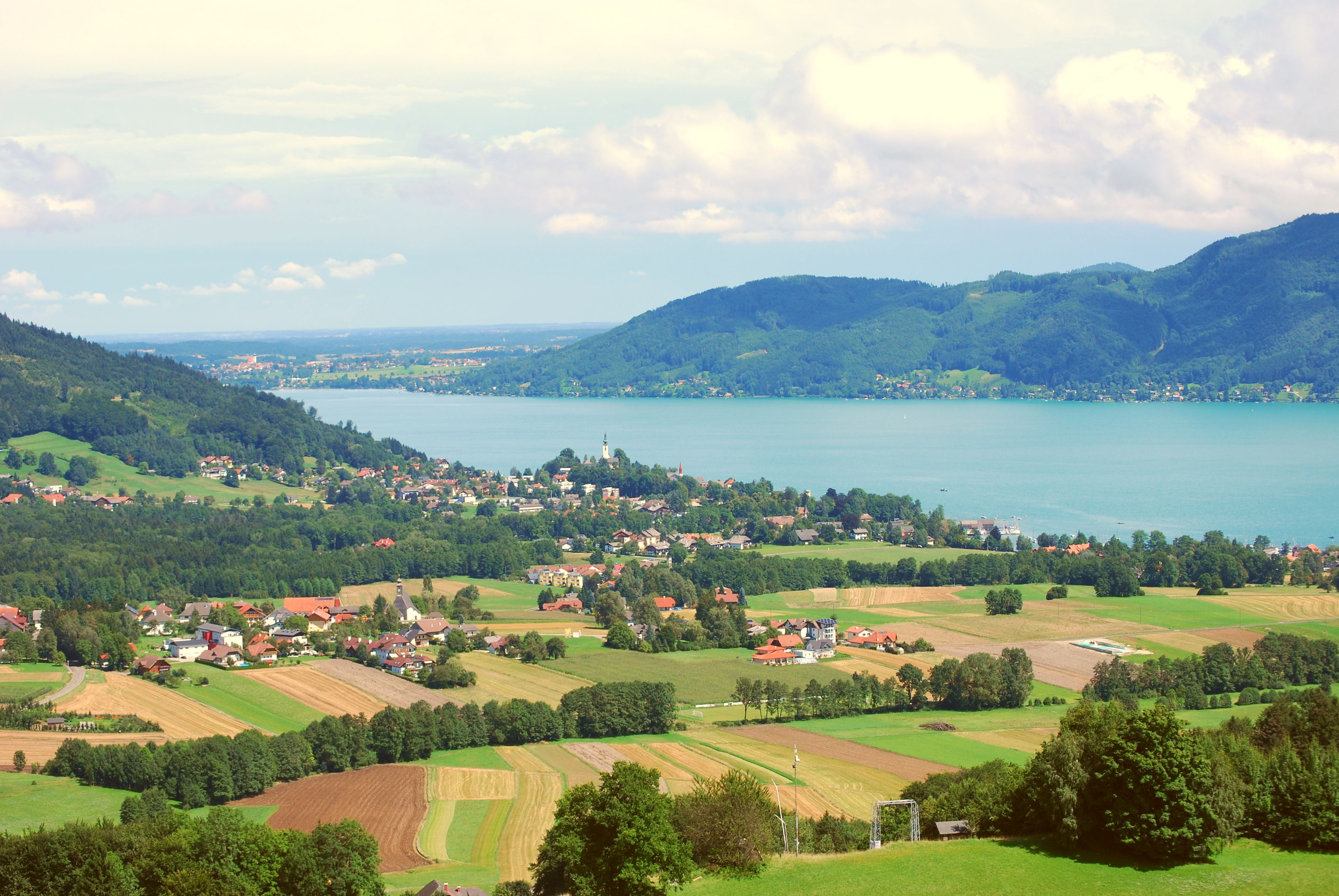

- Coat of arms

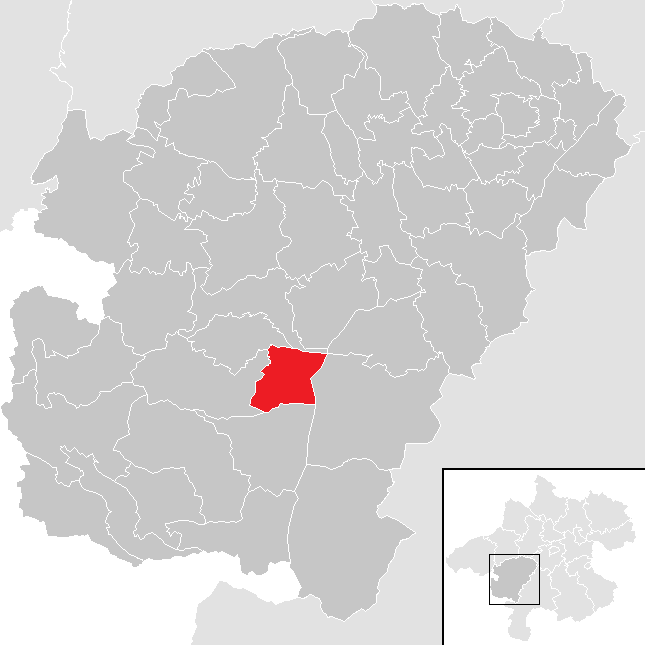
- Location in the district

- Location within Austria
- Coordinates: 47°55′00″N 13°32′29″E
- Country: Austria
- State: Upper Austria
- District: Vöcklabruck

Government
  - Mayor: Walter Kastinger (SPÖ)

Area
  - Total: 14.67 km^{2} (5.66 sq mi)
- Elevation: 496 m (1,627 ft)

Population (2018-01-01)
  - Total: 1,585
  - Density: 108.0/km^{2} (279.8/sq mi)
- Time zone: UTC+1 (CET)
  - Summer (DST): UTC+2 (CEST)
- Postal code: 4864
- Area code: 07666
- Vehicle registration: VB
- Website: www.attersee.ooe.gv.at

Attersee am Attersee is a village on the western shore of Attersee lake in the Austrian state of Upper Austria.

== Geography ==
The village center lies between the lake and the slopes of the Buchberg (888 m or 2913 feet, "Beech Mountain") and is the location of a Baroque pilgrimage church. There are views across the lake and up to the Höllengebirge ("Mountains of Hell").

=== Populated places ===
The municipality of Attersee am Attersee consists of the following cadastral communities: Abtsdorf and Attersee; while further subdivided into nine populated places (with population in brackets as of 1 January 2022).

- Abtsdorf (351)
- Altenberg (73)
- Attersee (393)
- Aufham (81)
- Breitenröth (69)
- Mühlbach (160)
- Neuhofen (179)
- Oberbach (61)
- Palmsdorf (267)

== Transport ==
A light railway connects the village with the main Westbahn railway line between Linz and Salzburg. The village is a centre for sailing on the Attersee, with a shipyard and an important yacht club (the Union Yachtclub Attersee) which organizes international sailing competitions. As Attersee am Attersee mainly depends on the tourist industry it can be very busy during the summer months but has a quieter ambiance during the winter. A village festival is held annually, when local people come together to celebrate and play music.

== UNESCO World Heritage Site ==
The village is home to prehistoric pile-dwelling (or stilt house) settlements that are part of the Prehistoric Pile dwellings around the Alps UNESCO World Heritage Site.
