= Mario Salani =

Italian yacht racer

Mario Salani (born 12 October 1966) is an Italian former yacht racer who competed in the 1992 Summer Olympics.
