= Lars Hendriksen =

Danish sailor

Personal information
- Full name: Lars Kindt Hendriksen
- Nationality: Danish
- Born: 17 January 1966 (age 60) Ølstykke, Denmark

Sport
- Sport: Sailing

Lars Kindt Hendriksen (born 16 January 1966) is a Danish former sailor. He competed in the Tornado event at the 1992 Summer Olympics.
