= Kim Andersen (sailor) =

Danish sports executive

Kim Andersen is the former President of World Sailing, the international governing body for sailing worldwide. Andersen was elected to the office of President at the World Sailing Annual Conference and General Assembly on 13 November 2016 in Barcelona, and finished his term in November 2020.

== Sports administration ==
Hailing from Denmark, Kim Andersen's first involvement in sailing administration was as part of the management team for the Danish Olympic Team for 10 years between 1992 and 2002, serving as Team Manager for Sailing Team Denmark at the 2000 Summer Olympics in Sydney, Australia. Andersen also became Commodore of the Royal Danish Yacht Club in 2007, and held this position for four years until 2011. Andersen became a member of the World Sailing (then ISAF) Council in 2000, a position he held for 8 years until 2008. In 2004, he became a member of the Events & Equipment Committee, and was appointed as Chair of the Equipment Committee in 2012 – a position he held until 2016.

On 23 September 2016, Kim Andersen's presidential candidacy was confirmed by World Sailing. Considered by some to be a surprise candidate, Andersen's campaign was run on the basis of three key principles:

- Keeping sailing in the Olympics by increasing participation and growing the global audience.
- Growing the sport geographically by creating a competitive offering for youth globally.
- Increasing the levels of transparency and accountability in World Sailing governance.

At the General Assembly of the World Sailing Annual Congress on 13 November 2016, Andersen was officially elected as president, defeating incumbent Carlo Croce in the second round of voting, with other candidate Paul Henderson being eliminated in the first round. Having become the first candidate to defeat an incumbent in the history of the organisation, Andersen failed in his bid for re-election, losing to current President Quanhai Li of China who will serve through to 2024.

== Sailing background ==
Having been a sailor from the age of 12 years in Flipper, Fireball, 470, 505, Flying Dutchman, Dragon and Danish one designs - 101, X79, X99, Luffe 37, winning Danish and Scandinavian championships and representing Denmark in more than 20 World and European Championships.

Since 2007, Andersen has been a regular racer in the Dragon categories at national and international events, winning three Danish and one Scandinavian Championship. Andersen won the Dragon European Championship in 2011, later coming 3rd and 6th in 2013 and 2016 respectively.

== Business career ==
Kim Andersen has developed an established career as an international businessman, living in four countries, Denmark, Australia, UK and Germany, along the way.

Andersen was previously as managing director of Rockfon and chairman of the board for subsidiaries in UK, Sweden and Poland, before joining Superfos Packaging in as President of Division Central. Andersen was promoted to Director of the Consumer Division Superfos Packaging, before becoming President/CEO in 2001, alongside chairman of the board for Subsidiaries in Sweden, Denmark, UK, France, Poland, Spain and the United States.

Having left Suprerfos, Andersen joined Nordic Property Care and Britannia Invest as managing director, before becoming Business Line Director for Grontmij Engineering. At present, Andersen is employed as vice president for MT Højgaard, the largest Danish contractor and one of the leading contractors in Scandinavia.

In addition to his business work, Andersen also served as board member in Kuben (Building Development and Administration) from 2005 to 2008 and as chairman of the board for Godhavn, an institution for children with mental disabilities, from 2007 to 2013. In this period, Andersen oversaw the development of the institution from a government-funded to a self-sustainable, privately funded organisation.

== Education ==
Andersen is a qualified Structural Architect, having studied at the Advanced College of Building Technology in Copenhagen. He has partaken in many management training and education courses at International Institute for Management Development in Lausanne between the years of 1990 and 2017.

== Personal life ==
Kim Andersen currently lives in Copenhagen, Denmark, with his wife, and has one daughter and two grandchildren. On top of sailing, Andersen is a keen golfer and skier. In addition to his native Danish, Andersen is fluent in English and German.
