= Magnus Liljedahl =

American sailor

Personal information
- Born: March 6, 1954 (age 72) Gothenburg, Sweden
- Height: 6 ft 2 in (187 cm)
- Weight: 249 lb (113 kg)

Sailing career
- Sport: Sailing
- Club: Coral Reef Yacht Club
- Class(es): Star, Finn
Medal record
Men's sailing
Representing the United States
Olympic Games
Gold medal – first place	2000 Sydney	Star

Magnus Liljedahl (born March 6, 1954, in Gothenburg, Sweden) is an American sailor and Olympic champion. He competed at the 2000 Summer Olympics in Sydney, where he received a gold medal in the star class, together with Mark Reynolds.

Magnus Liljedahl currently runs a non-profit organization devoted to paralympic and Youth sailing named Team Paradise.

== See also ==
- World Fit
