= Neil Foley =

American historian

Neil Foley is an American historian who studies U.S.-Mexico borderlands and the politics of immigration and citizenship in North America and Europe.

== Life ==
Dr. Neil Foley graduated from the University of Virginia and earned a M.A. from Georgetown University. He also holds a Master of Arts degree from the University of Michigan, where he attained the Ph.D. in American Culture in 1990. His dissertation on "The new South in the Southwest: Anglos, Blacks, and Mexicans in Central Texas, 1880-1930" was directed by Rebecca J. Scott.

Foley has taught at Humboldt University of Berlin and the University of Texas at Austin.

In 2012 he began teaching at Southern Methodist University, where he holds the Robert H. and Nancy Dedman Chair in History.

== Awards ==
- Frederick Jackson Turner Award of the Organization of American Historians, for The White Scourge: Mexicans, Blacks, and Poor Whites in Texas Cotton Culture
- Pacific Coast Branch Award of the American Historical Association
- Woodrow Wilson Center Fellow
- Guggenheim Fellowship
- National Endowment for the Humanities Fellowship
- American Council of Learned Societies Fellowship
- Fulbright Fellowship

== Works ==
- The White Scourge: Mexicans, Blacks, and Poor Whites in Texas Cotton Culture, University of California Press. University of California Press. 1997. ISBN 978-0-520-20724-0. "Neil Foley."
- Neil Foley, ed. (1998). Reflexiones 1997: New Directions in Mexican American Studies. University of Texas Press. ISBN 978-0-292-72506-5.
- Neil Foley; John R. Chávez (2002). Teaching Mexican American history. American Historical Association. ISBN 978-0-87229-126-3.
- Quest for Equality: The Failed Promise of Black-Brown Solidarity. Harvard University Press. 2010. ISBN 978-0-674-05023-5.
- Mexicans in the Making of America. Harvard University Press. 2014. ISBN 978-0-674-04848-5.
