= Josef Steinmayer =

Swiss sailor

Personal information
- Nationality: Swiss
- Born: 27 January 1947 (age 79)

Sport
- Sport: Sailing

Josef Steinmayer (born 27 January 1947) is a Swiss sailor. He competed in the Star event at the 1984 Summer Olympics.
