= Joachim Griese =

German sailor (1952–2024)

Joachim Griese (25 August 1952 – 17 November 2024) was a German competitive sailor and Olympic medalist. He won a silver medal in the Star class at the 1984 Summer Olympics in Los Angeles, together with Michael Marcour. Griese died on 17 November 2024, at the age of 72.
