= Michael Marcour =

German sailor

Michael Marcour (born 10 February 1959) is a German competitive sailor and Olympic medalist. He won a silver medal in the Star class at the 1984 Summer Olympics in Los Angeles, together with Joachim Griese.
