= Serhiy Timokhov =

Ukrainian sailor

Serhiy Timokhov (Ukrainian: Сергій Тімохов; born 9 May 1972) is a Ukrainian Olympics sailor that participated in the 2000 Summer Olympics.
