= Göran Tell =

Swedish sailor

Göran Tell is a Swedish former sailor in the Star class. He won the 1969 Star European Championships crewing for Börje Larsson.
