= Petter Mørland Pedersen =

Norwegian sailor (born 1984)

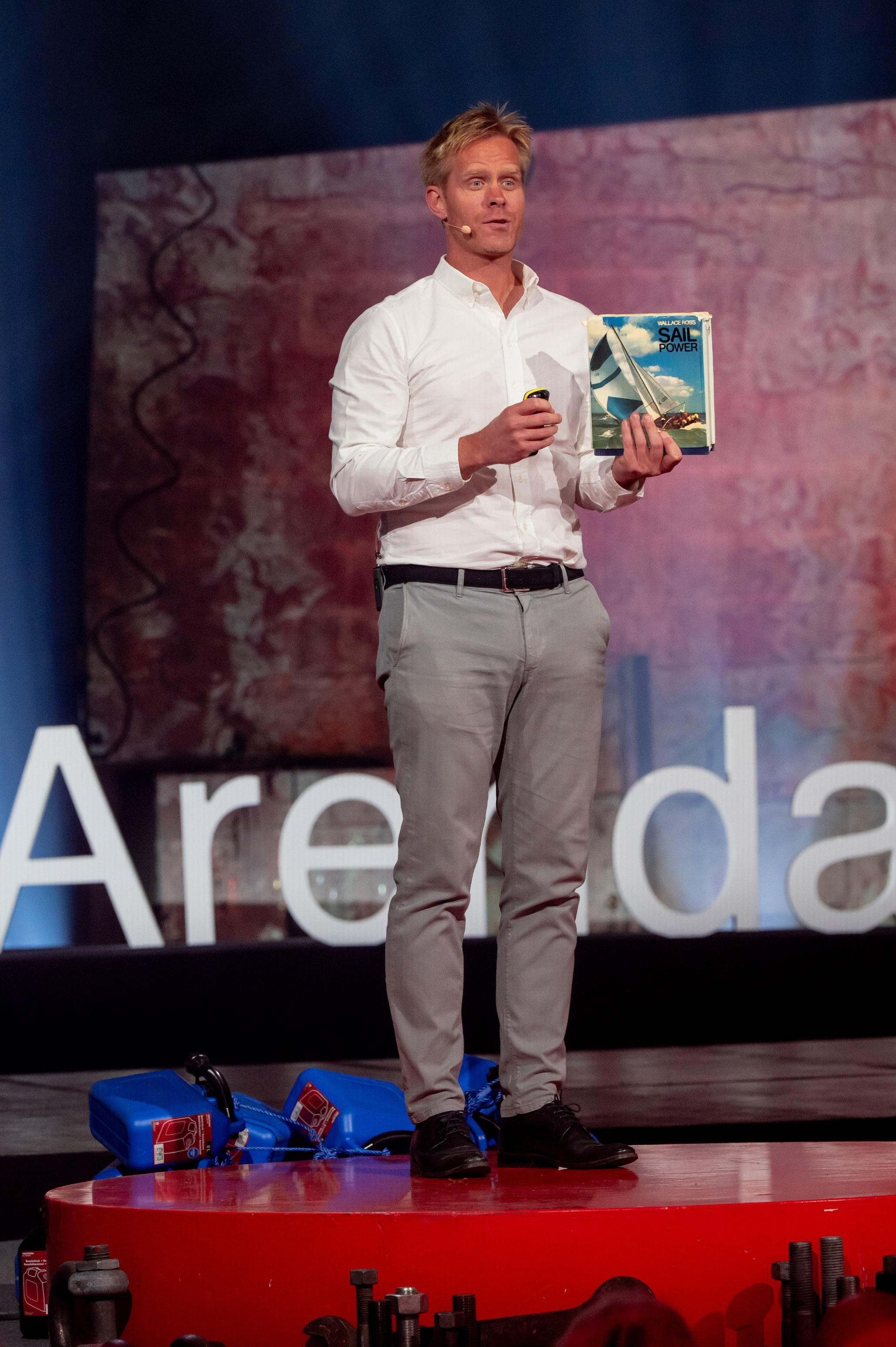

Personal information
- Born: 7 June 1984 (age 42) Arendal, Norway
- Height: 191 cm (6 ft 3 in)

Sport
- Sport: Sailing
Medal record
Sailing
Representing Norway
5.5 Metre World Championship
Silver medal – second place	2010 Lake Garda	5.5m
Bronze medal – third place	2015 Nynäshamn	5.5m

Petter Mørland Pedersen (born 7 June 1984) is a Norwegian sailor. He was born in Arendal. He came 4th whilst competing in two person keelboat (star) at the 2012 Summer Olympics in London.
