= Tom McWilliam =

Irish sailor

Personal information
- Nationality: Irish
- Born: 29 May 1967 (age 57)

Sport
- Sport: Sailing

Tom McWilliam (born 29 May 1967) is an Irish sailor. He competed in the Star event at the 1992 Summer Olympics.
