= Norbert Wagner (sailor) =

German sailor (born 1935)

Norbert Wagner (born 23 October 1935) was a German sailor who competed in the 1972 Summer Olympics.
