= Kai Falkenthal =

German yacht racer

Kai Falkenthal (born 8 May 1965) is a German former yacht racer who competed in the 1996 Summer Olympics.
