= Ulf Norrman =

Swedish sailor (1935–2020)

Ulf Johan Norrman (16 March 1935 – 20 January 2020) was a Swedish Olympic sailor in the Star class. He competed in the 1968 Summer Olympics together with John Albrechtson, where they finished 9th. He was born in Gothenburg, Sweden.
