= Aleksandr Shalagin =

Russian footballer and coach

Personal information
- Full name: Aleksandr Lvovich Shalagin
- Date of birth: 9 September 1982 (age 44)
- Height: 1.76 m (5 ft 9 in)
- Position: Midfielder

Team information
- Current team: Ural-2 Yekaterinburg (assistant coach)

Youth career
- Uralmash Yekaterinburg

Senior career*
Years	Team	Apps	(Gls)
2001	Uralmash Yekaterinburg	0	(0)
2002	Metallurg-Metiznik Magnitogorsk	13	(0)
2002	Uralets Nizhny Tagil	9	(0)
2003–2004	Ural Yekaterinburg	24	(0)
2004–2005	Uralets Nizhny Tagil	38	(2)
2006	SOYUZ-Gazprom Izhevsk	9	(0)
2009	Ural Yekaterinburg	2	(0)

Managerial career
- 2018–2020: Ural-2 Yekaterinburg (assistant)
- 2020–2026: Ural Yekaterinburg (assistant)
- 2026: Ural-2 Yekaterinburg
- 2026–: Ural-2 Yekaterinburg (assistant)
- * Club domestic league appearances and goals

Aleksandr Lvovich Shalagin (Russian: Александр Львович Шалагин; born 9 September 1982) is a Russian professional football coach and a former player who is an assistant coach of Ural-2 Yekaterinburg.

== Club career ==
He played two seasons in the Russian Football National League for Ural Yekaterinburg.
