= Hartmann Bogumil =

German sailor

Personal information
- Nationality: German
- Born: 28 October 1938 (age 86); Mrągowo, Poland

Sport
- Sport: Sailing

Hartmann Bogumil (born 28 October 1938) is a German sailor. He competed in the Star event at the 1968 Summer Olympics.
