= Frank Butzmann =

German yacht racer

Personal information
- Full name: Frank Olaf Butzmann
- Nationality: German
- Born: 18 December 1958 (age 67) Potsdam, Brandenburg, Germany
- Height: 184 cm (6 ft 0 in)
- Weight: 99 kg (218 lb)

Sailing career
- Sport: Sailing
- Club: Verein Seglerhaus am Wannsee
- Class(es): Star, Finn

Frank Olaf Butzmann (born 18 December 1958) is a German former yacht racer who competed in the 1996 Summer Olympics.
