= Wolf Stadler =

German sailor

Personal information
- Nationality: German
- Born: 6 March 1947 (age 79) Tegernsee, Germany

Sport
- Sport: Sailing

Wolf Stadler (born 6 March 1947) is a German former sailor. He competed at the 1972 Summer Olympics and the 1976 Summer Olympics.
