= Luigi Croce =

Italian yacht racer (born 1940)

Luigi Croce (born 27 November 1940) is an Italian former yacht racer who competed in the 1964 Summer Olympics.
