= Aleksandr Zybin =

Soviet sailor

Personal information
- Nationality: Soviet
- Born: 20 March 1951; Nizhny Novgorod, Russia
- Died: 4 November 2010 (aged 59); Los Angeles, California, United States

Sport
- Sport: Sailing

Aleksandr Zybin (20 March 1951 – 4 November 2010) was a Soviet sailor. He competed at the 1980 Summer Olympics and the 1988 Summer Olympics.
