= Börje Larsson (sailor) =

Swedish sailor

Börje Larsson is a Swedish former sailor in the Star class. He won the 1969 Star European Championships with the crew Göran Tell. In 1989-90, he was a crewmember on boat The Card in the Whitbread Round the World Race.

== Achievements ==
As of 27 September 2015

Year	Competition	Venue	Position	Event
2009	Star World Championships	Varberg, Sweden	85th	Star class
