= Richard Clarke (sailor) =

Canadian yacht racer (born 1968)

Medal record

Sailing

Representing Canada

Pan American Games
Gold medal – first place	1999 Winnipeg	Men's Finn

Richard Clarke (born 20 November 1968, in Toronto) is a Canadian former yacht racer who competed in the 1996 Summer Olympics, in the 2000 Summer Olympics, in the 2004 Summer Olympics, and in the 2012 Summer Olympics.

In 2001–02, he was a crewmember on Illbruck in the Volvo Ocean Race.
