= Stellan Westerdahl =

Swedish sailor (1935–2018)

Medal record

Sailing

Representing Sweden

Olympic Games
Silver medal – second place	1972 Munich	Star class

Stellan Westerdahl (10 November 1935 – 27 August 2018) was a Swedish sailor. He won a silver medal in the star class at the 1972 Summer Olympics with Pelle Pettersson.
