= Vincent Hösch =

German sailor

Personal information
- Nationality: Germany
- Born: 16 February 1957 (age 69) Munich

Sailing career
- Sport: Sailing
- Class(es): Laser, Finn, Tempest, Star, Soling, Dragon

Vincent "Vinci" Hösch (born 16 February 1957 in Munich, West Germany) is a German sailor in the Laser, Finn, Tempest, Star, Soling & Dragon classes.

He won the 1981 Star World Championships crewing for Alexander Hagen.
