= Karl Ferstl =

Austrian sailor

Medal record

Sailing

Representing Austria

Olympic Games
Silver medal – second place	1980 Moscow	Star class

Karl Ferstl (born 31 December 1945) is an Austrian sailor. He won the Olympic Silver Medal in the 1980 in Star class along with Hubert Raudaschl. He was also the flag bearer for Austria in the 1980 Moscow Olympics.
