= 470 European Championships =

International sailing regattas

The 470 European Championships are international sailing regattas in the 470 class, held annually since 1966. Non-European entries are allowed to take part since the 1972 edition, however they will not become European champions.

== Medals (1966-2024) ==
Rank	Nation	Gold	Silver	Bronze	
1	France	21	11	13	45
2	Sweden	8	2	6	16
3	Germany (Note: Includes medals won by West Germany and East Germany from 1949 to 1990.)	7	17	13	37
4	Spain	7	7	6	20
5	Ukraine	7	1	0	8
6	United Kingdom	6	7	8	21
7	Italy	5	8	10	23
8	Greece	4	3	2	9
9	Netherlands	3	8	8	19
10	Russia (Note: Includes medals won by the Soviet Union.)	3	4	5	12
11	Austria	3	3	0	6
12	Portugal	3	2	1	6
13	Finland	3	1	3	7
14	Croatia	3	1	2	6
15	Israel	2	6	6	14
16	Denmark	2	5	0	7
17	Slovenia	2	4	3	9
18	Switzerland	1	2	2	5
19	Norway	1	1	0	2
20	Belgium	1	0	1	2
21	Estonia	1	0	0	1
22	Poland	0	0	4	4
	TOTAL	93	93	93	279

== Editions ==
Host cities of the 470 European Championships

Year	City	Country	Dates	Events	Athletes	Nations	Notes
1966	Boulogne-sur-Mer	France	14–17 July	1	126	3	
1967	Lacanau	France	29–31 July	1	256	2	
1968	Palamós	Spain	2–6 August	1	268	8	
1969	Castiglione della Pescaia	Italy	26–30 August	1	88	5	
1971	Southend-on-Sea	United Kingdom	4–8 July	1	128	9	
1972	Medemblik	Netherlands	13–19 July	1	238	9	
1973	Saint-Cast-le-Guildo	France		1	340	14	
1974	El Masnou	Spain	8–16 July	1	302	15	
1975	Stokes Bay	United Kingdom	12–22 August	1	226	20	
1976	Hellerup	Denmark	13–22 August	1	152	15	
1977	Rust	Austria	8–15 June	1	160	21	
1978	Cascais	Portugal	15–22 July	1	122	23	
1979	Dénia	Spain	6–15 July	1	204	24	
1980	Helsinki	Finland	7–15 June	1	104	20	
1981	Morges	Switzerland	30 May – 7 June	1	138	19	
1982	Balatonfüred	Hungary	28 August – 6 September	1	154	19	
1983	Puck	Poland	26 August – 2 September	1	154	19	
1984	Salou	Spain	5–13 May	1	140	20	
1985	Koper	Yugoslavia	6–13 July	1	158	20	
1986	Sønderborg	Denmark	30 June – 10 July	2			
1987	Lysekil	Sweden	15–22 August	2			
1988	Quiberon	France	27 June – 10 July	2			
1989	Balatonfüred	Hungary	21–29 September	2			
1990	Marina di Carrara	Italy	5–14 July	2			
1991	Bergen	Norway	5–13 July	2			
1992	Nieuwpoort	Belgium	10–18 June	2			
1993	Breitenbrunn	Austria	5–13 June	2			
1994	Röbel	Germany	5–12 June	2			
1995	Båstad	Sweden	8–17 June	2			
1996	Hayling Island	United Kingdom	6–15 June	2			
1997	Nieuwpoort	Belgium	10–19 July	2			
1998	Çeşme	Turkey	21–30 July	2			
1999	Zadar	Croatia	5–14 August	2			
2000	Malcesine	Italy	5–14 June	2			
2001	Dún Laoghaire	Ireland	10–19 July	2			
2002	Tallinn	Estonia	25 July – 3 August	2			
2003	Brest	France	6–15 July	2			
2004	Warnemünde	Germany	31 May – 10 June	2			
2005	Gdynia	Poland	5–14 June	2			
2006	Balatonfüred	Hungary	10–18 June	2			
2007	Thessaloniki	Greece	1–10 June	2			
2008	Riva del Garda	Italy	5–14 June	2			
2009	Traunsee	Austria	5–14 June	2			
2010	Istanbul	Turkey	28 August – 6 September	2			
2011	Helsinki	Finland	6–15 July	2			
2012	Largs	United Kingdom	25 June – 4 July	2			
2013	Formia	Italy	8–15 June	2			
2014	Athens	Greece	8–15 July	2			
2015	Aarhus	Denmark	27 June – 4 July	2			
2016	s'Arenal	Spain	5–12 April	2			
2017	Monaco	Monaco	6–13 May	2			
2018	Burgas	Bulgaria	16–24 May	2			
2019	Sanremo	Italy	6–14 May	2			
2021	Vilamoura	Portugal	30 April – 7 May	2			
2022	Çeşme	Turkey	10–18 September	1			
2023	Sanremo	Italy	12–20 May	1	100 (Note: 130 including non-European entries)	19 (Note: 26 including non-European entries)	
2024	Cannes	France	7–12 May	1	92	22	
2025	Split	Croatia	12–17 May	1	37	14	
2026	Vilamoura	Portugal	9–14 March	1	53	19	

== Medalists ==
=== Open ===
Year	Gold	Silver	Bronze
1966 Boulogne-sur-Mer	France; Gabriel de Kergariou; Alain Cordonnier	France; Léon Brillouet; Blanchard	France; Jean-Claude Cornu; Jean Morin
1967 Lacanau	Belgium; Paul Maes; Daniel Quertainmont	France; Marc Bouet; Joël Desbois	France; Yves Pajot; Marc Pajot
1968 Palamós	France; Marc Bouet; Joël Desbois	France; Yves Pajot; Marc Pajot	France; Jean-Louis Brehant; Jean-François Brehant
1969 Castiglione della Pescaia	France; Marc Bouet; Michel Christ	France; Marc Laurent; Michel Cornic	Switzerland; Bernard de Gaudenzi; Malignon
1971 Southend-on-Sea	France; Philippe Follenfant; Hubert Follenfant	Netherlands; Tom van Essen; Wouter van Essen	Belgium; Paul Maes; Daniel Quertainmont
1972 Medemblik	Netherlands; Joop van Werkhoven; Robert van Werkhoven	France; Philippe Follenfant; Hubert Follenfant	Netherlands; Tom van Essen; Wouter van Essen
1973 Saint-Cast-le-Guildo	Denmark; Henrik Söderlund; Anders Børresen	West Germany; Frank Hübner; Klaus Feldmann	Netherlands; Joop van Werkhoven; Robert van Werkhoven
1974 El Masnou	France; Marc Bouet; Stéphane Fleury	Spain; Juan Santana; Francisco Colom	France; Philippe Follenfant; Hubert Follenfant
1975 Stokes Bay	Switzerland; Jean-Claude Vuithier; Laurent Quellet	Norway; C. Aazer; Walter	West Germany; Frank Hübner; Harro Bode
1976 Hellerup	Sweden; Olle Johansson; Lars Johansson	Denmark; Lars Lønberg; Dan Ibsen Sørensen	Poland; Leon Wróbel; Tomasz Stocki
1977 Rust	Soviet Union; Yuri Koriachkin; Vasili Koriachkin	East Germany; Helmar Nauck; Harald Schaale	Israel; Shimshon Brokman; Eitan Friedlander
1978 Cascais	Soviet Union; Mikhail Kudryavtsev; Edgar Terekhin	Israel; Shimshon Brokman; Eitan Friedlander	Poland; Leon Wróbel; Tomasz Stocki
1979 Dénia	Israel; Shimshon Brokman; Eitan Friedlander	West Germany; Wolfgang Hunger; Niels Korte	Poland; Leon Wróbel; Tomasz Stocki
1980 Helsinki	East Germany; Jörn Borowski; Egbert Svensson	France; Daniel Péponnet; Thierry Peponnet	Soviet Union; Vladimir Ignatenko; Sergei Jdanov
1981 Morges	Italy; Tommaso Chieffi; Enrico Chieffi	East Germany; Jörn Borowski; Egbert Svensson	Italy; Sandro Montefusco; Paolo Montefusco
1982 Balatonfüred	East Germany; Jurgen Brietzke; Ekkehard Schulz	Israel; Shimshon Brokman; Eitan Friedlander	France; Thierry Peponnet; Luc Pillot
1983 Puck	East Germany; Jörn Borowski; Egbert Svensson	Italy; Sandro Montefusco; Paolo Montefusco	France; Thierry Peponnet; Luc Pillot
1984 Salou	Finland; Peter von Koskull; Johan von Koskull	Netherlands; John Stavenuiter; Guido Alkemade	Netherlands; Hans Duetz; Jan Bos
1985 Koper	Spain; Luis Doreste; Roberto Molina	Italy; Gianfranco Noe; Andrea Ballico	Italy; Tommaso Chieffi; Enrico Chieffi

=== Men and Mixed ===
Year	Gold	Silver	Bronze
1986 Sønderborg	France; Thierry Péponnet; Luc Pillot	Netherlands; Hans Duetz; Jan Bos	East Germany; Jurgen Brietzke; Ekkehard Schulz
1987 Lysekil	Finland; Peter von Koskull; Johan von Koskull	France; Thierry Péponnet; Luc Pillot	Spain; Jordi Calafat; Roberto Molina
1988 Quiberon	France; Thierry Péponnet; Luc Pillot	Italy; Sandro Montefusco; Paolo Montefusco	Finland; Peter von Koskull; Johan von Koskull
1989 Balatonfüred	Italy; Sandro Montefusco; Paolo Montefusco	West Germany; Wolfgang Hunger; Rolf Schmidt	France; Jean-François Berthet; Gwenaël Berthet
1990 Marina di Carrara	Italy; Giovanni Cassinari; Daniele Cassinari	Switzerland; Stefan Seger; Dominik Liener	West Germany; Rainer Schulz; Frank Thieme
1991 Bergen	Norway; Herman Horn Johannessen; Pal Mccarthy	Netherlands; Ben Kouwenhoven; Jan Kouwenhoven	Germany; Wolfgang Hunger; Rolf Schmidt
1992 Nieuwpoort	Estonia; Tõnu Tõniste; Toomas Tõniste	Sweden; Magnus Lundgren; Urban Lagneus	Netherlands; Ben Kouwenhoven; Jan Kouwenhoven
1993 Breitenbrunn	Sweden; Markus Westerlind; Henrik Wallin	Germany; Michael Koch; Stefan Theuerkauf	Israel; Shay Bachar; Ilan Tshtash
1994 Röbel	Italy; Matteo Ivaldi; Michele Ivaldi	Great Britain; John Merricks; Ian Walker	Spain; Jordi Calafat; Kiko Sánchez
1995 Båstad	Great Britain; John Merricks; Ian Walker	Finland; Petri Leskinen; Mika Aarnika	Germany; Ronald Rensch; Torsten Haverland
1996 Hayling Island	Russia; Dmitry Berezkin; Yevgeny Burmatnov	Portugal; Hugo Rocha; Nuno Barreto	Great Britain; John Merricks; Ian Walker
1997 Nieuwpoort	Portugal; Hugo Rocha; Nuno Barreto	Ukraine; Yevhen Braslavets; Ihor Matviyenko	Finland; Petri Leskinen; Kristian Heinilä
1998 Çeşme	Portugal; Hugo Rocha; Nuno Barreto	Slovenia; Tomaž Čopi; Mitja Margon	Portugal; Álvaro Marinho; Miguel Nunes
1999 Zadar	Sweden; Johan Molund; Mattias Rahm	Slovenia; Tomaž Čopi; Mitja Margon	France; Gildas Philippe; Tanguy Cariou
2000 Malcesine	France; Gildas Philippe; Tanguy Cariou	Italy; Matteo Ivaldi; Francesco Ivaldi	Spain; Gustavo Martinez; Tunte Cantero
2001 Dún Laoghaire	Ukraine; Yevhen Braslavets; Ihor Matviyenko	Israel; Gideon Kliger; Udi Gal	Italy; Gabrio Zandonà; Andrea Trani
2002 Tallinn	France; Nicolas Charbonnier; Stéphane Christidis	Greece; Andreas Kosmatopoulos; Konstantinos Trigonis	Great Britain; Nick Rogers; Jonathan Glanfield
2003 Brest	France; Gildas Philippe; Nicolas Le Berre	Germany; Lucas Zellmer; Felix Krabbe	Sweden; Johan Molund; Martin Andersson
2004 Warnemünde	Great Britain; Nick Rogers; Jonathan Glanfield	Russia; Dmitry Berezkin; Mikhail Krutikov	Sweden; Johan Molund; Martin Andersson
2005 Gdynia	Great Britain; Nick Rogers; Jonathan Glanfield	Israel; Gideon Kliger; Udi Gal	Netherlands; Sven Coster; Kalle Coster
2006 Balatonfüred	France; Benjamin Bonnaud; Romain Bonnaud	France; Ronan Dreano; Ronan Floch	France; Pierre Leboucher; Vincent Garos
2007 Thessaloniki	Portugal; Álvaro Marinho; Miguel Nunes	France; Nicolas Charbonnier; Olivier Bausset	Italy; Gabrio Zandonà; Andrea Trani
2008 Riva del Garda	Great Britain; Nic Asher; Elliot Willis	Netherlands; Sven Coster; Kalle Coster	Israel; Gideon Kliger; Udi Gal
2009 Traunsee	Croatia; Šime Fantela; Igor Marenić	Germany; Lucas Zellmer; Heiko Seelig	Italy; Gabrio Zandonà; Edoardo Mancinelli Scotti
2010 Istanbul	Greece; Panagiotis Mantis; Pavlos Kagialis	Israel; Gideon Kliger; Eran Sela	Great Britain; Luke Patience; Stuart Bithell
2011 Helsinki	Croatia; Šime Fantela; Igor Marenić	Great Britain; Luke Patience; Stuart Bithell	Israel; Gideon Kliger; Eran Sela
2012 Largs	Croatia; Šime Fantela; Igor Marenić	Great Britain; Ben Saxton; Richard Mason	Russia; Mikhail Sheremetyev; Maksim Sheremetyev

=== Men ===
Year	Gold	Silver	Bronze
2013 Formia	France; Sofian Bouvet; Jérémie Mion	Great Britain; Luke Patience; Jonathan Glanfield	Croatia; Šime Fantela; Igor Marenić
2014 Athens	Great Britain; Luke Patience; Elliot Willis	Austria; Matthias Schmid; Florian Reichstädter	Croatia; Šime Fantela; Igor Marenić
2015 Aarhus	Germany; Ferdinand Gerz; Oliver Szymanski	Greece; Panagiotis Mantis; Pavlos Kagialis	Russia; Pavel Sozykin; Denis Gribanov
2016 Mallorca	France; Sofian Bouvet; Jérémie Mion	Croatia; Šime Fantela; Igor Marenić	Italy; Simon Sivitz Kosuta; Jas Farneti
2017 Monaco	Sweden; Carl-Fredrik Fock; Marcus Dackhammar	France; Guillaume Pirouelle; Jérémie Mion	Spain; Jordi Xammar; Nicolás Rodríguez
2018 Burgas	Sweden; Anton Dahlberg; Fredrik Bergström	Greece; Panagiotis Mantis; Pavlos Kagialis	Germany; Malte Winkel; Matti Cipra
2019 Sanremo	Sweden; Anton Dahlberg; Fredrik Bergström	Spain; Jordi Xammar; Nicolás Rodríguez	France; Kevin Peponnet; Jérémie Mion
2021 Vilamoura	France; Kevin Peponnet; Jérémie Mion	Spain; Jordi Xammar; Nicolás Rodríguez	Sweden; Anton Dahlberg; Fredrik Bergström

=== Women ===
Year	Gold	Silver	Bronze
1986 Sønderborg	France; Florence Lebrun; Sophie Berge	Netherlands; Wilma Kramer; Henneke Stavenuiter	Italy; Paola Porta; Anna Barabino
1987 Lysekil	Finland; Bettina Lemström; Annika Mannström	Netherlands; Henny Vegter; Marion Bultman	Sweden; Marit Söderström; Birgitta Bengtsson
1988 Quiberon	Netherlands; Henny Vegter; Marion Bultman	Sweden; Marit Söderström; Birgitta Bengtsson	East Germany; Peggy Hardwiger; Christina Pinnow
1989 Balatonfüred	East Germany; Peggy Hardwiger; Christina Pinnow	East Germany; Suzanne Theel; Wibke Buelle	Finland; Bettina Lemström; Annika Mannström
1990 Marina di Carrara	France; Florence Lebrun; Odile Barre	Spain; Núria Bover; Irene Martín	West Germany; Tanja Stemler; Sabine Lenkmann
1991 Bergen	Spain; Theresa Zabell; Patricia Guerra	Soviet Union; Larisa Moskalenko; Elena Pakholchik	Great Britain; Debbie Jarvis; Rosie Tribe
1992 Nieuwpoort	Spain; Theresa Zabell; Patricia Guerra	Italy; Maria Quarra; Anna Barabino	CIS; Larisa Moskalenko; Elena Pakholchik
1993 Breitenbrunn	Ukraine; Ruslana Taran; Svetlana Oleksenko	Germany; Susanne Meyer; Katrin Adlkofer	Germany; Nicola Birkner; Wibke Bülle
1994 Röbel	Spain; Theresa Zabell; Begoña Vía Dufresne	Germany; Tanja Stemler; Susanne Bergmann	Germany; Susanne Bauckholt; Katrin Adlkofer
1995 Båstad	Ukraine; Ruslana Taran; Elena Pakholchik	Germany; Ines Bohn; Sabine Rohatzsch	Spain; Laura León; Viviane Mainemare
1996 Hayling Island	Ukraine; Ruslana Taran; Elena Pakholchik	Germany; Susanne Bauckholt; Katrin Adlkofer	Germany; Peggy Bahr; Christina Pinnow
1997 Nieuwpoort	Ukraine; Ruslana Taran; Elena Pakholchik	Denmark; Susanne Ward; Michaela Ward	Italy; Federica Salvà; Emanuela Sossi
1998 Çeşme	Ukraine; Ruslana Taran; Elena Pakholchik	Germany; Stephanie Trübel; Carolin Grosser	Greece; Sofia Bekatorou; Emilia Tsoulfa
1999 Zadar	Ukraine; Ruslana Taran; Elena Pakholchik	Denmark; Susanne Ward; Michaela Ward	Netherlands; Lisa Westerhof; Alexandra Verbeek
2000 Malcesine	Greece; Sofia Bekatorou; Emilia Tsoulfa	Denmark; Susanne Ward; Michaela Ward	Russia; Vladilena Krachun; Natalia Gaponovich
2001 Dún Laoghaire	Greece; Sofia Bekatorou; Emilia Tsoulfa	Spain; Natalia Vía Dufresne; Sandra Azón	Israel; Nike Kornecki; Vered Buskila
2002 Tallinn	Greece; Sofia Bekatorou; Emilia Tsoulfa	Russia; Vladelina Ilienko; Diana Krutskikh	Netherlands; Lisa Westerhof; Margriet Matthijsse
2003 Brest	Spain; Natalia Vía Dufresne; Sandra Azón	Slovenia; Vesna Dekleva; Klara Maučec	Sweden; Therese Torgersson; Vendela Zachrisson-Santén
2004 Warnemünde	Denmark; Susanne Ward; Michaela Ward	Russia; Vladelina Ilienko; Natalia Gaponovich	Israel; Nike Kornecki; Vered Buskila
2005 Gdynia	France; Ingrid Petitjean; Nadège Douroux	Israel; Nike Kornecki; Vered Buskila	Sweden; Therese Torgersson; Vendela Zachrisson-Santén
2006 Balatonfüred	Germany; Stefanie Rothweiler; Vivien Kussatz	Austria; Sylvia Vogl; Carolina Flatscher	Spain; Marina Gallego; Laia Tutzó
2007 Thessaloniki	Germany; Stefanie Rothweiler; Vivien Kussatz	Italy; Giulia Conti; Giovanna Micol	Italy; Elisabetta Saccheggiani; Elisa Cecconi
2008 Riva del Garda	Austria; Sylvia Vogl; Carolina Flatscher	Switzerland; Emmanuelle Rol; Anne-Sophie Thilo	Slovenia; Vesna Dekleva; Klara Maučec
2009 Traunsee	Italy; Giulia Conti; Giovanna Micol	Spain; Tara Pacheco; Berta Betanzos	Greece; Anthi Economou; Olga Tsigaridi
2010 Istanbul	France; Emmanuelle Rol; Hélène Defrance	Italy; Giulia Conti; Giovanna Micol	France; Ingrid Petitjean; Nadège Douroux
2011 Helsinki	Spain; Tara Pacheco; Berta Betanzos	Denmark; Henriette Koch; Lene Sommer	Great Britain; Hannah Mills; Saskia Clark
2012 Largs	Great Britain; Sophie Weguelin; Sophie Ainsworth	Slovenia; Tina Mrak; Teja Černe	Germany; Annika Bochmann; Elisabeth Panuschka
2013 Formia	France; Camille Lecointre; Mathilde Géron	Austria; Lara Vadlau; Jolanta Ogar	Great Britain; Sophie Weguelin; Eilidh McIntyre
2014 Athens	Austria; Lara Vadlau; Jolanta Ogar	Great Britain; Hannah Mills; Saskia Clark	Slovenia; Tina Mrak; Veronika Macarol
2015 Aarhus	Slovenia; Tina Mrak; Veronika Macarol	France; Camille Lecointre; Hélène Defrance	Great Britain; Sophie Weguelin; Eilidh McIntyre
2016 Mallorca	Austria; Lara Vadlau; Jolanta Ogar	Netherlands; Afrodite Kyranakou; Anneloes van Veen	Slovenia; Tina Mrak; Veronika Macarol
2017 Monaco	Netherlands; Afrodite Zegers; Anneloes van Veen	Italy; Elena Berta; Sveva Carraro	Poland; Agnieszka Skrzypulec; Jolanta Ogar
2018 Burgas	Slovenia; Tina Mrak; Veronika Macarol	Germany; Frederike Loewe; Anna Markfort	Germany; Nadine Boehm; Ann-Christin Goliass
2019 Sanremo	France; Camille Lecointre; Aloïse Retornaz	Great Britain; Hannah Mills; Eilidh McIntyre	Netherlands; Afrodite Zegers; Lobke Berkhout
2021 Vilamoura	France; Camille Lecointre; Aloïse Retornaz	Great Britain; Hannah Mills; Eilidh McIntyre	Switzerland; Linda Fahrni; Maja Siegenthaler

=== Mixed ===
Year	Gold	Silver	Bronze
2022 Çeşme	Sweden; Anton Dahlberg; Lovisa Karlsson	Spain; Jordi Xammar; Nora Brugman	Italy; Giacomo Ferrari; Bianca Caruso
2023 Santo Stefano al Mare	Sweden; Anton Dahlberg; Lovisa Karlsson	Germany; Simon Diesch; Anna Markfort	France; Hippolyte Machetti; Aloïse Retornaz
2024 Cannes	Spain; Jordi Xammar; Nora Brugman	Portugal; Diogo Costa; Carolina João	France; Jérémie Mion; Camille Lecointre
2025 Split	Spain; Jordi Xammar; Marta Cardona	Great Britain; Martin Wrigley; Bettine Harris	France; Matisse Pacaud; Lucie de Gennes
2026 Vilamoura	Great Britain; Martin Wrigley; Bettine Harris	Italy; Giacomo Ferrari; Alessandra Dubbini	Spain; Jordi Xammar; Marta Cardona
