= Trofeo Princesa Sofía =

Sailing regatta in Palma de Majorca, Spain

- First held: 1968
- Organizer: Club Nàutic S'Arenal; Club Marítimo San Antonio de la Playa; Real Club Náutico de Palma
- Classes: 2.4mR, 470, 49er, 49er FX, Dragon, Finn, Kite boarding, Laser, Laser Radial, Nacra 17, RS:X
- Venue: Palma de Majorca
- Website: trofeoprincesasofia.org

Trofeo Princesa Sofía is an annual sailing regatta in Palma de Majorca, Spain, organised by the clubs Club Nàutic S'Arenal, Club Marítimo San Antonio de la Playa, Real Club Náutico de Palma, and federations Real Federación Española de Vela and Federación Balear de Vela.

The 46th edition was held in April and May 2015. It is part of the 2015 EUROSAF Champions Sailing Cup. Together with the Semaine Olympique Française, Allianz Regatta, and Kiel Week regattas, Trofeo Princesa Sofía is part of the Sailing World Cup in the 2023 and 2024 seasons.

== Winners ==
=== Trofeo Princesa Sofía ===
Year	Class	Winner(s)	Ref.
1968	(Spain) A. Larrañaga, J. Fernández de Mesa & G. Macpherson	Dragon	
1969	(Denmark) A. Holm, P. Holm & P. Hons Jensen	Dragon	
1971	(Denmark) M. Pedersen, J. Borensen & M. Nielsen	Dragon	
1972	(Austria) H. Fereberger, F. Eisl & K. Stangl	Dragon	
1973	(Spain) Prince Juan Carlos, Gonzalo Fernández de Córdoba & Félix Gancedo	Dragon	
1974	(France) P. Lecrit & D. Duvallet	470	
1975	(Spain) Tomas Estela & Miguel Estela	420	
1976	(Spain) Antonio Gorostegui & Pedro Millet	470	
1978	(Spain) Félix Gancedo & Carlos Llamas	Snipe	
1979	(Spain) A. Gutiérrez & M. Cerdà	470	
1979	(Spain) Luis Doreste	Europe	
1979	(Spain) Jan Abascal & Miguel Noguer	Flying Dutchman	
1980	(Spain) Félix Gancedo & Carlos Llamas	Snipe	
1981	(Denmark) Lasse Hjortnæs	Finn	
1982	(Spain) Félix Gancedo & Carlos Llamas	Snipe	
1983	(Spain) Jorge Haenelt & Laureano Wizner	Snipe	
1984	(Spain) F. G. Lamadrid	T.D.V.	
1985	(Spain) Luis Doreste & Roberto Molina	470	
1986	(Argentina) Santiago Lange & Miguel Saubidet	Snipe	
1987	(Argentina) Santiago Lange & Miguel Saubidet	Snipe	
1988	(United Kingdom) Stuart Childerley	Finn	
1989	(Spain) Jordi Calafat & Kiko Sánchez	470	
1990	(Argentina) Guillermo Parada & Gonzalo Martínez	Snipe	
1991	(Spain) Guillermo Parada & Gonzalo Martínez	Snipe	
1992	(Spain) Natalia Vía Dufresne	Europe	
1993	(Spain) Antonio Rivas Más	Europe	
1994	(Brazil) George Nehm & Fernando Krahe	Snipe	
1995	(Spain) Luis Doreste & Roberto Molina	470	
1996	(Denmark) Kristine Roug	Europe	
1997	(Spain) Antonio Rivas Más	Europe	
1998	(Argentina) Carlos Espínola	Mistral One Design	
1999	(Spain) Pablo Arandia	Europe	
2000	(Italy) Diego Negri	Laser	
2001	(Finland) Sari Multala	Europe	
2002	(France) Alexandre Guyader	Mistral One Design	
2003	(Sweden) Fredik Svensson	Europe	
2004	(Sweden) Karl Suneson	Laser	
2005	(Spain) Iván Pastor	Mistral One Design	
2006	(United Kingdom) Nick Dempsey	men's RS:X	
2007	(New Zealand) Barbara Kendall	women's RS:X	
2008	(Germany) Petra Niemann	Laser Radial	
2009	(Spain) Blanca Manchón	women's RS:X	
2010	(Italy) Alessandra Sensini	women's RS:X	
2011	(United Kingdom) Ben Ainslie	Finn	
2012	(Netherlands) Thierry Schmitter	2.4 Metre	
2013	(Denmark) Ida Marie Baad Nielsen & Marie Thusgaard Olsen	49er FX	
2014	(Netherlands) Marit Bouwmeester	Laser Radial	
2015	(New Zealand) Jo Aleh & Polly Powrie	women's 470	
2016	(France) Billy Besson & Marie Riou	Nacra 17	
2017	(Poland) Zofia Noceti-Klepacka	women's RS:X	
2019	(China) Tan Yue	women's RS:X	
2022	(Italy) Ruggero Tita & Caterina Banti	Nacra 17	
2023	(Singapore) Maximilian Maeder	Formula Kite	
2024	(Australia) Breiana Whitehead	women's Formula Kite	

=== Men's Europe ===
- 1998 – Pablo Arandia (ESP)
- 1999 – Pablo Arandia (ESP)
- 2001 – Valérian Lebrun (FRA)

=== Women's Europe ===
- 1995 – Natalia Vía Dufresne (ESP)
- 1998 – Shirley Robertson (GBR)
- 1999 – Kristine Roug (DEN)
- 2001 – Sari Multala (FIN)

=== Open Europe ===
- 1979 – Luis Doreste (ESP)
- 1992 – Natalia Vía Dufresne (ESP)
- 1993 – Antonio Rivas Más (ESP)
- 1996 – Kristine Roug (DEN)
- 1997 – Antonio Rivas Más (ESP)
- 2003 – Fredik Svensson (SWE)

=== Finn ===
- 1981 – Lasse Hjortnæs (DEN)
- 1983 – Jørgen Lindhardsen (DEN)
- 1984 – Lasse Hjortnæs (DEN)
- 1985 – Joaquín Blanco Roca (ESP)
- 1986 – Thomas Schmid (FRG)
- 1987 – José Luis Doreste (ESP)
- 1988 – Stuart Childerley (GBR)
- 1992 – Eric Mergenthaler (MEX)
- 1994 – Fredrik Lööf (SWE)
- 1995 – Fredrik Lööf (SWE)
- 1996 – Mateusz Kusznierewicz (POL)
- 1997 – Mateusz Kusznierewicz (POL)
- 1998 – Xavier Rohart (FRA)
- 1999 – Mateusz Kusznierewicz (POL)
- 2001 – Mateusz Kusznierewicz (POL)
- 2005 – Aimilios Papathanasiou (GRE)
- 2006 – Jonas Høgh-Christensen (DEN)
- 2007 – Marin Mišura (CRO)
- 2008 – Ben Ainslie (GBR)
- 2009 – Giles Scott (GBR)
- 2010 – Ed Wright (GBR)
- 2011 – Ben Ainslie (GBR)
- 2012 – Ben Ainslie (GBR)
- 2013 – Giles Scott (GBR)
- 2014 – Giles Scott (GBR)
- 2015 – Giles Scott (GBR)
- 2016 – Josh Junior (NZL)
- 2017 – Max Salminen (SWE)
- 2018 – Giles Scott (GBR)
- 2019 – Andy Maloney (NZL)

=== ILCA 6 (formerly known as Laser Radial) ===
- 2005 – Paige Railey (USA)
- 2006 – Evi Van Acker (BEL)
- 2007 – Evi Van Acker (BEL)
- 2008 – Petra Niemann (GER)
- 2009 – Paige Railey (USA)
- 2010 – Tina Mihelić (CRO)
- 2011 – Sara Winther (NZL)
- 2012 – Alicia Cebrián (ESP)
- 2013 – Alison Young (GBR)
- 2014 – Marit Bouwmeester (NED)
- 2015 – Evi Van Acker (BEL)
- 2016 – Tuula Tenkanen (FIN)
- 2017 – Zhang Dongshuang (CHN)
- 2018 – Anne-Marie Rindom (DEN)
- 2019 – Anne-Marie Rindom (DEN)
- 2022 – Sarah Douglas (CAN)
- 2023 – Marit Bouwmeester (NED)
- 2024 - Mária Érdi (HUN)

=== ILCA 7 (formerly known as Laser) ===
- 1995 – Emil Tomašević (CRO)
- 1998 – Carlos Martínez (ESP)
- 1999 – Peer Moberg (NOR)
- 2000 – Diego Negri (ITA)
- 2001 – Paul Goodison (GBR)
- 2004 – Karl Suneson (SWE)
- 2005 – Gustavo Lima (POR)
- 2006 – Maciej Grabowski (POL)
- 2007 – Julio Alsogaray (ARG)
- 2008 – Paul Goodison (GBR)
- 2009 – Nick Thompson (GBR)
- 2010 – Javier Hernández (ESP)
- 2011 – Paul Goodison (GBR)
- 2012 – Simon Grotelüschen (GER)
- 2013 – Andy Maloney (NZL)
- 2014 – Tom Burton (AUS)
- 2015 – Philipp Buhl (GER)
- 2016 – Andy Maloney (NZL)
- 2017 – Francesco Marrai (ITA)
- 2018 – Matthew Wearn (AUS)
- 2019 – Christopher Barnard (USA)
- 2022 – Michael Beckett (GBR)
- 2023 – Michael Beckett (GBR)
- 2024 - Michael Beckett (GBR)

=== Musto Skiff ===
- 2022 – Andy Tarboton (RSA)

=== 420 ===
- 1975 – Tomas Estela & Miguel Estela (ESP)
- 1998 – Daniel Folch Albareda & Jordi Flos (ESP)
- 1999 – Dimitra Milona & Aliki Kourkoulou (GRE)
- 2001 – José Antonio Medina & Juan M. Cerezo (ESP)

=== Men's 470 ===
- 1995 – Jordi Calafat (ESP)
- 1998 – Petri Leskinen & Kristian Heinilä (FIN)
- 1999 – Álvaro Marinho & Miguel Nunes (POR)
- 2001 – Lucas Zellner & Felix Krabbe (GER)
- 2005 – Nic Asher (GBR)
- 2006 – Gideon Kliger (ISR)
- 2007 – Álvaro Marinho (POR)
- 2008 – Gabrio Zandonà & Andrea Trani (ITA)
- 2009 – Nicolas Charbonnier & Baptiste Meyer (FRA)
- 2010 – Pierre Leboucher & Vincent Garos (FRA)
- 2011 – Nicolas Charbonnier & Jérémie Mion (FRA)
- 2012 – Mathew Belcher & Malcolm Page (AUS)
- 2013 – Mathew Belcher & Will Ryan (AUS)
- 2014 – Šime Fantela & Igor Marenić (CRO)
- 2015 – Lucas Calabrese & Juan de la Fuente (ARG)
- 2016 – Mathew Belcher & Will Ryan (AUS)
- 2017 – Tetsuya Isozaki & Akira Takayanagi (JPN)
- 2018 – Mathew Belcher & Will Ryan (AUS)
- 2019 – Anton Dahlberg & Fredrik Bergström (SWE)

=== Women's 470 ===
- 1995 – Theresa Zabell & Begoña Vía Dufresne (ESP)
- 1998 – Federica Salvà & Emanuela Sossi (ITA)
- 1999 – Susanne Ward & Michaëla Ward (DEN)
- 2001 – Natalia Vía Dufresne & Sandra Azón (ESP)
- 2005 – Sylvia Vogl (AUT)
- 2006 – Christina Bassadone (GBR)
- 2007 – Marcelien de Koning (NED)
- 2008 – Marcelien de Koning & Lobke Berkhout (NED)
- 2009 – Sylvia Vogl & Carolina Flatscher (AUT)
- 2010 – Giulia Conti & Giovanna Micol (ITA)
- 2011 – Jo Aleh & Bianca Barbarich-Bacher (NZL)
- 2012 – Giulia Conti & Giovanna Micol (ITA)
- 2013 – Fernanda Oliveira & Ana Barbachan (BRA)
- 2014 – Jo Aleh & Polly Powrie (NZL)
- 2015 – Jo Aleh & Polly Powrie (NZL)
- 2016 – Agnieszka Skrzypulec & Irmina Gliszczyńska (POL)
- 2017 – Afrodite Zegers & Anneloes van Veen (NED)
- 2018 – Ai Yoshida & Miho Yoshioka (JPN)
- 2019 – Hannah Mills & Eilidh McIntyre (GBR)

=== Mixed 470 ===
- 2022 – Jordi Xammar & Nora Brugman (ESP)
- 2023 – Keiju Okada & Miho Yoshioka (JPN)
- 2024 – Camille Lecointre & Jeremie Mion (FRA)

=== Open 470 ===
- 1974 – P. Lecrit & D. Duvallet (FRA)
- 1976 – Antonio Gorostegui & Pedro Millet (ESP)
- 1979 – A. Gutiérrez & M. Cerdà (ESP)
- 1985 – Luis Doreste & Roberto Molina (ESP)
- 1989 – Jordi Calafat & Kiko Sánchez (ESP)

=== 49er ===
- 1998 – Marcus Baur & Phillip Barth (GER)
- 1999 – Francesco Bruni & Gabriele Bruni (ITA)
- 2001 – Iker Martínez de Lizarduy & Xabier Fernández (ESP)
- 2005 – Marcin Czajkowski (POL)
- 2006 – Pietro Sibello (ITA)
- 2007 – Stevie Morrison (GBR)
- 2008 – Rodion Luka & George Leonchuk (UKR)
- 2009 – Pietro Sibello & Gianfranco Sibello (ITA)
- 2010 – Emmanuel Dyen & Stéphane Christidis (FRA)
- 2011 – Emmanuel Dyen & Stéphane Christidis (FRA)
- 2012 – Jonas Warrer & Søren Hansen (DEN)
- 2013 – Erik Heil & Thomas Plößel (GER)
- 2014 – Peter Burling & Blair Tuke (NZL)
- 2015 – Peter Burling & Blair Tuke (NZL)
- 2016 – Ryan Seaton & Matt McGovern (IRL)
- 2017 – James Peters & Fynn Sterritt (GBR)
- 2018 – Yago Lange & Klaus Lange (ARG)
- 2019 – Dylan Fletcher-Scott & Stuart Bithell (GBR)
- 2022 – Erwan Fischer & Clément Pequin (FRA)
- 2023 – Logan Dunning Beck & Oscar Gunn (NZL)
- 2024 - Diego Botin Le Chever & Florian Trittel Paul (ESP)

=== 49er FX ===
- 2013 – Ida Marie Baad Nielsen & Marie Thusgaard Olsen (DEN)
- 2014 – Martine Grael & Kahena Kunze (BRA)
- 2015 – Maiken Foght Schütt & Anne-Julie Foght Schütt (DEN)
- 2016 – Annemiek Bekkering & Annette Duetz (NED)
- 2017 – Victoria Jurczok & Anika Lorenz (GER)
- 2018 – Annemiek Bekkering & Annette Duetz (NED)
- 2019 – Martine Grael & Kahena Kunze (BRA)
- 2022 – Odile van Aanholt & Annette Duetz (NED)
- 2023 – Martine Grael & Kahena Kunze (BRA)
- 2024 – Jana Germani & Giorgia Bertuzzi (ITA)

=== Flying Dutchman ===
- 1979 – Jan Abascal & Miguel Noguer (ESP)

=== Snipe ===
- 1978 – Félix Gancedo & Carlos Llamas (ESP)
- 1980 – Félix Gancedo & Carlos Llamas (ESP)
- 1982 – Félix Gancedo & Carlos Llamas (ESP)
- 1983 – Jorge Haenelt & Laureano Wizner (ESP)
- 1986 – Santiago Lange & Miguel Saubidet (ARG)
- 1987 – Santiago Lange & Miguel Saubidet (ARG)
- 1990 – Guillermo Parada & Gonzalo Martínez (ARG)
- 1991 – Guillermo Parada & Gonzalo Martínez (ESP)
- 1994 – George Nehm & Fernando Krahe (BRA)
- 1998 – Damian Borras Camps & Javier Magro (ESP)
- 1999 – Cristóbal Bosch Mesquida & Pedro Alles Coll (ESP)

=== 2.4 Metre ===
- 2009 – Thierry Schmitter (NED)
- 2010 – Thierry Schmitter (NED)
- 2011 – Thierry Schmitter (NED)
- 2012 – Thierry Schmitter (NED)
- 2013 – Bjørnar Erikstad (NOR)
- 2014 – Helena Lucas (GBR)
- 2015 – Helena Lucas (GBR)
- 2016 – Heiko Kröger (GER)

=== 6 Metre ===
- 2023 – Stella – Violeta Alvarez (ESP)

=== Dragon ===
- 1968 – A. Larrañaga, J. Fernández de Mesa & G. Macpherson (ESP)
- 1969 – A. Holm, P. Holm & P. Hons Jensen (DEN)
- 1971 – M. Pedersen, J. Borensen & M. Nielsen (DEN)
- 1972 – H. Fereberger, F. Eisl & K. Stangl (AUT)
- 1973 – Prince Juan Carlos, Gonzalo Fernández de Córdoba & Félix Gancedo (ESP)
- 1998 – Harm Müller-Spreer, Thomas Auracher & Vincent Hösch (GER)
- 1999 – Martin Payne, Martin Dassler & Michael Lipp (POR)
- 2001 – My Way – Frank Berg, Søren Kæstel & Søren Pehrsson (DEN)
- 2015 – Lazy Daisy – Marc Patiño, Pau Balaguer & Juan Galmés (ESP)
- 2016 – Lady Tati – Patrick de Barros, Vincent Hösch & Rodrigo Vantacich (POR)
- 2017 – Lady Tati – Patrick Monteiro de Barros, Álvaro Marinho & Rodrigo Vantacich (POR)
- 2018 – Meerblickd21 – Otto Pohlmann, Markus Koy & Jorge Manuel Lima (UAE)
- 2019 – Debutant – Ivan Bradury, Lars Hendriksen & George Leonchuk (GBR)
- 2022 – Powwow – Michael Zankel, João Matos Rosa & Diogo Pereira (GER)
- 2023 – Mr. Nova – Jorge Forteza Castro, Joan Freizas Pages & Miguel Santaursula Vila (ESP)

=== Elliott 6m ===
- 2010 – Renee Groeneveld, Annemieke Bes & Brechtje van der Werf (NED)
- 2011 – Sally Barkow, Elizabeth Kratzig & Alana O'Reilly (USA)
- 2012 – Anna Tunnicliffe, Deborah Capozzi & Molly Vandemoer (USA)

=== J/70 ===
- 2023 – Luis Albert Solana (ESP)

=== J/80 ===
- 2017 – Javier Chacartegui, Juan Miguel Barrionuevo Vallejo, Chisco Pomar & Juan Miguel Riera Truyols (ESP)
- 2018 – Javier Chacartegui (ESP)
- 2019 – Javier Chacartegui (ESP)
- 2022 – Helena Alegre Aran, Ines Fernandez Billon, Philip Marcus Parry, Laura Martínez & Flavia Tomiselli (ESP)
- 2023 – Helena Alegre Aran, Cati Darder, Andreu Jaume & Xisco Pomar (ESP)

=== Star ===
- 1995 – Philippe Cospain (FRA)
- 1999 – Alexander Hagen & Thorsten Helmert (GER)
- 2001 – José van der Ploeg & Thomas Chad (ESP)
- 2007 – Robert Scheidt & Bruno Prada (BRA)
- 2009 – Robert Stanjek & Markus Koy (GER)
- 2010 – Fredrik Lööf & Johan Tillander (SWE)
- 2011 – Iain Percy & Andrew Simpson (GBR)
- 2012 – Robert Scheidt & Bruno Prada (BRA)

=== Viper 640 ===
- 2019 – Lawrence Crispin, Hector Cisneros & Luka Crispin (GBR)

=== Yngling ===
- 2005 – Janneke Hin (NED)
- 2006 – Sally Barkow (USA)
- 2007 – Sally Barkow (USA)
- 2008 – Anna Basalkina, Yekaterina Maksimova & Vladislava Ukraintseva (RUS)

=== Nacra 17 ===
- 2013 – Mandy Mulder & Thijs Visser (NED)
- 2014 – Billy Besson & Marie Riou (FRA)
- 2015 – Billy Besson & Marie Riou (FRA)
- 2016 – Billy Besson & Marie Riou (FRA)
- 2017 – Fernando Echávarri & Tara Pacheco (ESP)
- 2018 – Ruggero Tita & Caterina Banti (ITA)
- 2019 – Jason Waterhouse & Lisa Darmanin (AUS)
- 2022 – Ruggero Tita & Caterina Banti (ITA)
- 2023 – John Gimson & Anna Burnet (GBR)
- 2024 – Ruggero Tita & Caterina Banti (ITA)

=== Tornado ===
- 1995 – Fernando León Boissier (ESP)
- 1998 – Helge Sach & Christian Sach (GER)
- 1999 – Darren Bundock & John Forbes (AUS)
- 2001 – Mitch Booth & Herbert Dercksen (NED)
- 2005 – Darren Bundock (AUS)
- 2006 – Darren Bundock (AUS)

=== Men's Formula Kite ===
- 2015 – Florián Trittel (ESP)
- 2022 – Theo de Ramecourt (FRA)
- 2023 – Maximilian Maeder (SGP)
- 2024 – Maximilian Maeder (SGP)

=== Women's Formula Kite ===
- 2015 – Yelena Kalinina (RUS)
- 2022 – Daniela Moroz (USA)
- 2023 – Lauriane Nolot (FRA)
- 2024 – Breiana Whitehead (AUS)

=== Men's IQfoil ===
- 2022 – Andy Brown (GBR)
- 2023 – Samuel Oliver Sills (GBR)
- 2024 – Pawel Tarnowski (POL)

=== Women's IQfoil ===
- 2022 – Hélène Noesmoen (FRA)
- 2023 – Emma Wilson (GBR)
- 2024 – Mina Mobekk (NOR)

=== Men's Mistral ===
- 1995 – Jorge Maciel (ESP)
- 1998 – Carlos Espínola (ARG)
- 1999 – Cédric Leroy (FRA)
- 2001 – Nick Dempsey (GBR)
- 2002 – Alexandre Guyader (FRA)
- 2005 – Iván Pastor (ESP)

=== Women's Mistral ===
- 1995 – Dorien de Vries (NED)
- 1998 – Perrine Vangilve (FRA)
- 1999 – Anna Gałecka (POL)
- 2001 – Eugénie Raffin (FRA)
- 2005 – Olha Maslivets (UKR)

=== Men's RS:X ===
- 2006 – Nick Dempsey (GBR)
- 2007 – Tom Ashley (NZL)
- 2008 – Nick Dempsey (GBR)
- 2009 – Dorian van Rijsselberghe (NED)
- 2010 – Byron Kokkalanis (GRE)
- 2011 – Dorian van Rijsselberghe (NED)
- 2013 – Iván Pastor (ESP)
- 2014 – Pierre Le Coq (FRA)
- 2015 – Kiran Badloe (NED)
- 2016 – Tom Squires (GBR)
- 2017 – Paweł Tarnowski (POL)
- 2018 – Paweł Tarnowski (POL)
- 2019 – Michael Cheng (HKG)

=== Women's RS:X ===
- 2006 – Bryony Shaw (GBR)
- 2007 – Barbara Kendall (NZL)
- 2008 – Alessandra Sensini (ITA)
- 2009 – Blanca Manchón (ESP)
- 2010 – Alessandra Sensini (ITA)
- 2011 – Marina Alabau (ESP)
- 2013 – Flavia Tartaglini (ITA)
- 2014 – Charline Picon (FRA)
- 2015 – Charline Picon (FRA)
- 2016 – Olga Maslivets (RUS)
- 2017 – Zofia Noceti-Klepacka (POL)
- 2018 – Lilian de Geus (NED)
- 2019 – Tan Yue (CHN)

=== T.D.V. ===
- 1984 – F. G. Lamadrid (ESP)
