= 2011 ISAF Sailing World Championships – Men's 470 =

Men's sailing competition

Men's 470 at the 2011 ISAF Sailing World Championships
- Venue: Perth, Western Australia
- Dates: 5–11 December
- Competitors: 160 from 39 nations

Medalists
gold medal	Mathew Belcher; Malcolm Page	Australia
silver medal	Luke Patience; Stuart Bithell	Great Britain
bronze medal	Šime Fantela; Igor Marenić	Croatia

The Men's 470 class at the 2011 ISAF Sailing World Championships was held in Perth, Western Australia between 5 and 11 December 2011.

== Results ==
Results of individual races
Pos	Helmsman	Country	I	II	III	IV	V	VI	VII	VIII	IX	X	MR	Tot	Pts
Gold medal	Mathew Belcher; Malcolm Page	Australia	9^{†}	1	1	1	1	3	1	1	6	5	8	37	28
Silver medal	Luke Patience; Stuart Bithell	Great Britain	5	1	1	1	1	27^{†}	9	3	8	9	2	67	40
Bronze medal	Sime Fantela; Igor Marenić	Croatia	22	2	2	5	2	1	8	DSQ 41^{†}	1	3	16	103	62
4	Gideon Kliger; Eran Sela	Israel	2	12	9	11	3	2	4	BFD 41^{†}	5	1	20	110	69
5	Nicolas Charbonnier; Jérémie Mion	France	14	6	2	10	8	26^{†}	2	9	11	12	6	106	80
6	Pierre Leboucher; Vincent Garos	France	4	10	3	7	15	24	26^{†}	4	2	7	10	112	86
7	Panagiotis Mantis; Pavlos Kagialis	Greece	3	8	16	4	3	8	15	16	24^{†}	15	4	116	92
8	Paul Snow-Hansen; Jason Saunders	New Zealand	1	9	16	3	7	13	10	11	16	18^{†}	14	118	100
9	Onán Barreiros; Aarón Sarmiento	Spain	5	26	5	8	8	19	28^{†}	6	9	4	12	130	102
10	Nick Rogers; Chris Grube	Great Britain	14	5	4	2	19	4	3	15	18	20^{†}	18	122	102
11	Anton Dahlberg; Sebastian Östling	Sweden	2	16	3	7	11	32^{†}	11	12	4	27	–	125	93
12	Panagiotis Kampouridis; Efstathios Papadopoulos	Greece	15	13	11	4	14	16	22^{†}	19	3	2	–	119	97
13	Stuart McNay; Graham Biehl	United States	11	5	8	5	5	20	12	18	21^{†}	16	–	121	100
14	Nic Asher; Elliot Willis	Great Britain	12	4	10	8	2	33	6	2	35^{†}	26	–	138	103
15	Ferdinand Gerz; Patrick Follmann	Germany	7	7	7	2	5	22	21	BFD 41^{†}	19	13	–	144	103
16	Tetsuya Matsunaga; Kimihiko Imamura	Japan	3	4	17	18	6	17	5	17	33^{†}	21	–	141	108
17	Álvaro Marinho; Miguel Nunes	Portugal	27^{†}	12	14	20	10	6	7	8	7	24	–	135	108
18	Sven Coster; Kalle Coster	Netherlands	20	14	5	6	9	21^{†}	20	13	12	11	–	131	110
19	Sofian Bouvet; Vincent Guillarm	France	29	32^{†}	8	12	12	9	14	7	13	6	–	142	110
20	Lucas Calabrese; Juan de la Fuente	Argentina	15	13	4	3	16	18	17	BFD 41^{†}	10	17	–	154	113
21	Matthias Schmid; Florian Reichstädter	Austria	10	18	6	14	10	12	27	5	32^{†}	25	–	159	127
22	Joonas Lindgren; Niklas Lindgren	Finland	1	2	13	15	6	25	34	BFD 41^{†}	28	10	–	175	134
23	Ryunosuke Harada; Yugo Yoshida	Japan	18	17	12	14	4	5	37	BFD 41^{†}	20	14	–	182	141
24	Gabrio Zandonà; Pietro Zucchetti	Italy	8	3	11	6	14	15	30	BFD 41^{†}	RDG 28.7	RDG 28.7	–	185.4	144.4
25	Ben Saxton; Richard Mason	Great Britain	4	20	7	16	OCS 41	11	36	DNF 41	14	8	–	198	157
26	Yannick Brauchli; Romuald Hausser	Switzerland	21	25	12	9	13	23	19	21	15	29^{†}	–	187	158
27	Phil Sparks; David Kohler	Great Britain	12	3	13	25	4	30^{†}	25	25	29	23	–	189	159
28	Wang Weidong; Deng Daokun	China	16	22	14	24	19	14	18	10	25^{†}	22	–	184	159
29	Luke Ramsay; Michael Leigh	Canada	33	14	6	9	22	10	16	24	26	35^{†}	–	195	160
30	Mikhail Sheremetyev; Maksim Sheremetyev	Russia	26	8	10	23	20	34	13	14	17	36^{†}	–	201	165
31	Sam Kivell; Will Ryan	Australia	7	23	18	25	13	7	23	22	31	32^{†}	–	201	169
32	Ger Owens; Scott Flanigan	Ireland	17	7	28	13	17	28	29^{†}	23	27	19	–	208	179
33	Adam Roberts; Nicholas Martin	United States	6	16	24	10	7	36^{†}	35	20	36	28	–	218	182
34	Kim Chang-ju; Kim Ji-hoon	South Korea	13	23	9	19	9	29	33	BFD 41^{†}	22	38	–	236	195
35	Kosuta Simon Sivitz; Jas Farneti	Italy	6	11	18	17	24	38	24	BFD 41^{†}	30	39	–	248	207
36	Park Gun-woo; Cho Sung-min	South Korea	27	11	15	21	20	37	39^{†}	26	23	37	–	256	217
37	Jan-Jasper Wagner; Tobias Bolduan	Germany	28	19	22	13	17	31	32	BFD 41^{†}	37	33	–	273	232
38	Mitja Mikulin; Sebastian Princic	Slovenia	26	6	RDG 16	16	29	39	38	BFD 41^{†}	34	31	–	276	235
39	Francisco Javier Sucari; Marcos Jorge Lamas Lounge	Argentina	10	17	22	17	OCS 41	35	31	BFD 41	38	34	–	286	245
40	Vianney Guilbaud; Mathieu Fountainer	France	9	19	23	27	OCS 41	2	5	2	1	1	–	130	89
41	Deniz Çınar; Ateş Çınar	Turkey	25	15	30	BFD 41^{†}	18	3	12	5	2	2	–	153	112
42	Asenathi Jim; Roger Beresford Hudson	South Africa	24	27^{†}	20	22	11	7	6	10	12	4	–	143	116
43	Lucas Zellmar; Heiko Seelig	Germany	19	21	26	27^{†}	15	5	8	12	9	5	–	147	120
44	Vladimir Chaus; Denis Gribanov	Russia	34	33	26	12	12	1	1	DNC 41^{†}	3	3	–	166	125
45	Alexander Conway; Patrick Conway	Australia	23	29^{†}	19	15	23	11	24	6	10	8	–	168	139
46	Matthew Crawford; Robert Crawford	Australia	8	18	28	30^{†}	26	13	14	22	4	12	–	175	145
47	Hiroki Maeda; Eisuke Noro	Japan	21	28	17	18	16	17	4	BFD 41^{†}	20	9	–	191	150
48	Ondrej Bobek; Pavel Bobek	Czech Republic	25	31^{†}	15	21	21	10	17	9	15	19	–	183	152
49	Yuya Ishikawa; Shoichi Yanagawa	Japan	17	26	30	BFD 41^{†}	21	BFD 41	10	1	6	6	–	199	158
50	Dirk Bennen; Remy Oomens	Netherlands	16	10	29	20	31	14	27	4	7	DNF 41^{†}	–	199	158
51	Benjamín Grez; Diego González	Chile	24	20	25^{†}	24	25	8	22	3	23	13	–	187	162
52	Henrik Rask Søgaard; Tobias Maduro Nørbo	Denmark	22	9	24	26	23	BFD 41^{†}	18	13	14	14	–	204	163
53	Russell Tsung Liang Kan; Terence Seng Kiat Koh	Singapore	31^{†}	21	19	19	24	6	28	28	5	15	–	196	165
54	Carlos Henrique Wanderley; Marco Capraro Brancher	Brazil	11	24	BFD 41^{†}	22	28	19	15	26	16	11	–	213	172
55	James Turner; Matthew Jones	New Zealand	37^{†}	31	29	31	18	9	20	11	17	7	–	210	173
56	Luke Stevenson; Sam Bullock	New Zealand	33	24	21	28	29	4	11	17	8	DNF 41^{†}	–	216	175
57	Tetsuo Watanabe; Shinji Hachiyama	Japan	30	15	23	32^{†}	25	15	30	24	11	10	–	215	183
58	David Bargehr; Lukas Mähr	Austria	37^{†}	29	25	26	33	20	13	15	21	21	–	240	203
59	Max Taylor; Tim Hannah	Australia	30	25	34^{†}	28	27	12	16	32	19	16	–	239	205
60	Piotr Ogrodnik; Pawel Choroba	Poland	20	27	32	35^{†}	26	16	25	14	30	18	–	243	208
61	Isamu Kendal Sakai Biddell; Michael John Halkes	Hong Kong	32	30	34^{†}	29	32	21	23	7	22	17	–	247	213
62	Iurii Zhuravlov; Pavlo Matsuyev	Ukraine	19	32	27	31	32	DNF 41^{†}	19	19	18	20	–	258	217
63	Fabio Dutra Pillar Silva; Gustavo Canal Thiesen	Brazil	RDG 30	22	32	11	22	18	2	DNF 41^{†}	DNC 41	DNC 41	–	260	219
64	Antonio Matos Rosa; Ricardo Schedel	Portugal	18	DSQ 41^{†}	20	29	34	DNS 41	3	8	27	DNS 41	–	262	221
65	Angus Galloway; Alex Gough	Australia	39^{†}	36	27	23	27	25	26	20	24	22	–	269	230
66	Henrique Haddad; Nicolas Ilg Leite de Castro	Brazil	35	30	31	30	28	23	32	16	13	DNF 41^{†}	–	279	238
67	Scott Cotton; Rob Size	Australia	32	33	33	35	30	BFD 41^{†}	7	27	32	23	–	293	252
68	Luke Morrison; Jack Morrison	Australia	34	28	37	34	31	DNS 41^{†}	21	29	25	25	–	305	264
69	Gareth Moore; Ben Goodwin	New Zealand	35	35	36	32	DNF 41^{†}	22	31	21	29	24	–	306	265
70	Mike Snow Hansen; Derek Snow	New Zealand	23	34	38	37	30	31	DNF 41^{†}	34	26	26	–	320	279
71	Emerson Villena; Richly Magsanay	Philippines	31	34	31	DNF 41^{†}	DNS 41	DNS 41	9	23	33	DNF 41	–	325	284
72	Matthew Taylor; Ben Taylor	Australia	36	38^{†}	36	36	36	27	34	18	31	32	–	324	286
73	Ridgely Balladares; Chavez Rommel	Philippines	36	35	BFD 41^{†}	34	37	26	36	30	28	28	–	331	290
74	Raúl Ríos; Gerardo Fernández	Puerto Rico	28	37	35	33	35	30	33	25	35	DNF 41^{†}	–	332	291
75	Pushparajan Muttu; Narendra Singh Rajput	India	38^{†}	37	35	33	33	24	35	31	37	30	–	333	295
76	Ku Anas Ku Zamil; Mohd Hafizzudin Mazelan	Malaysia	13	36	33	38	DNF 41^{†}	29	DNC 41	DNC 41	39	31	–	342	301
77	Rohan Langford; Henry Goodfellow	Australia	38	39	37	37	38	28	29	DNF 41^{†}	34	27	–	348	307
78	Adam Negri; Sam Gilmour	Australia	40^{†}	40	39	36	34	33	38	33	36	29	–	358	318
79	Karl Bromfield; Neal Bromfield	Australia	39^{†}	38	38	38	39	32	37	35	38	33	–	367	328
80	Steven Le Ferve; Steven Krol	Netherlands	DSQ 41^{†}	DSQ 41	DSQ 41	DSQ 41	DSQ 41	DSQ 41	DSQ 41	DSQ 41	DSQ 41	DSQ 41	–	410	369

Legend: – Qualified for medal race(s); BFD – Black flag disqualification; DNC – Did not come to the starting area; DNF – Did not finish; DNS – Did not start; DSQ – Disqualified; OCS – On the course side of the starting line; RDG – Redress given; † – Discarded race not counted in the overall result;
