= Sailing at the 2008 Summer Olympics – Women's 470 =

Women’s 470 at the Games of the XXIX Olympiad
- Line drawing of the 470
- Venue: Qingdao International Sailing Centre
- Dates: First race: 11 August 2008; Last race: 18 August 2008
- Competitors: 38 from 19 nations
- Teams: 19 boats

Medalists
1st place, gold medalist(s)		Elise Rechichi; Tessa Parkinson	Australia
2nd place, silver medalist(s)		Marcelien de Koning; Lobke Berkhout	Netherlands
3rd place, bronze medalist(s)		Fernanda Oliveira; Isabel Swan	Brazil

The women's 470 was a sailing event on the Sailing at the 2008 Summer Olympics program in Qingdao International Sailing Centre. Eleven races (last one a medal race) were scheduled and completed. 38 sailors, on 19 boats, from 19 nations competed. Ten boats qualified for the medal race.

== Race schedule ==
●	Practice race	●	Race on Yellow	●	Race on Orange	●	Medal race on Yellow

Date	August																	
Date	7 Thu	8 Fri	9 Sat	10 Sun	11 Mon	12 Tue	13 Wed	14 Thu	15 Fri	16 Sat	17 Sun	18 Mon	19 Tue	20 Wed	21 Thu	22 Fri	23 Sat	24 Sun
Women’s 470				PR	S1,2	S3,4	S5,6	Res	S7,8	S9,10	Res	MR						

== Course areas and course configurations ==
For the 470 course areas A (Yellow) and D (Orange) were used. The location (36°1'26"’N, 120°26'52"E) points to the center of the 0.6nm radius Yellow course area and the location (36°1'10"N, 120°28'47"E) points to the center of the 0.75nm radius Orange course area. The target time for the course was about 60 minutes for the races and 30 minutes for the medal race. The race management could choose from several course configurations.

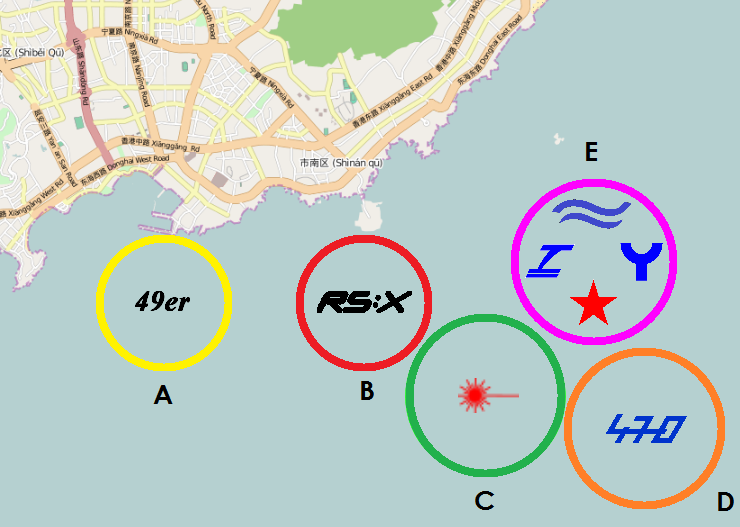
Course Areas

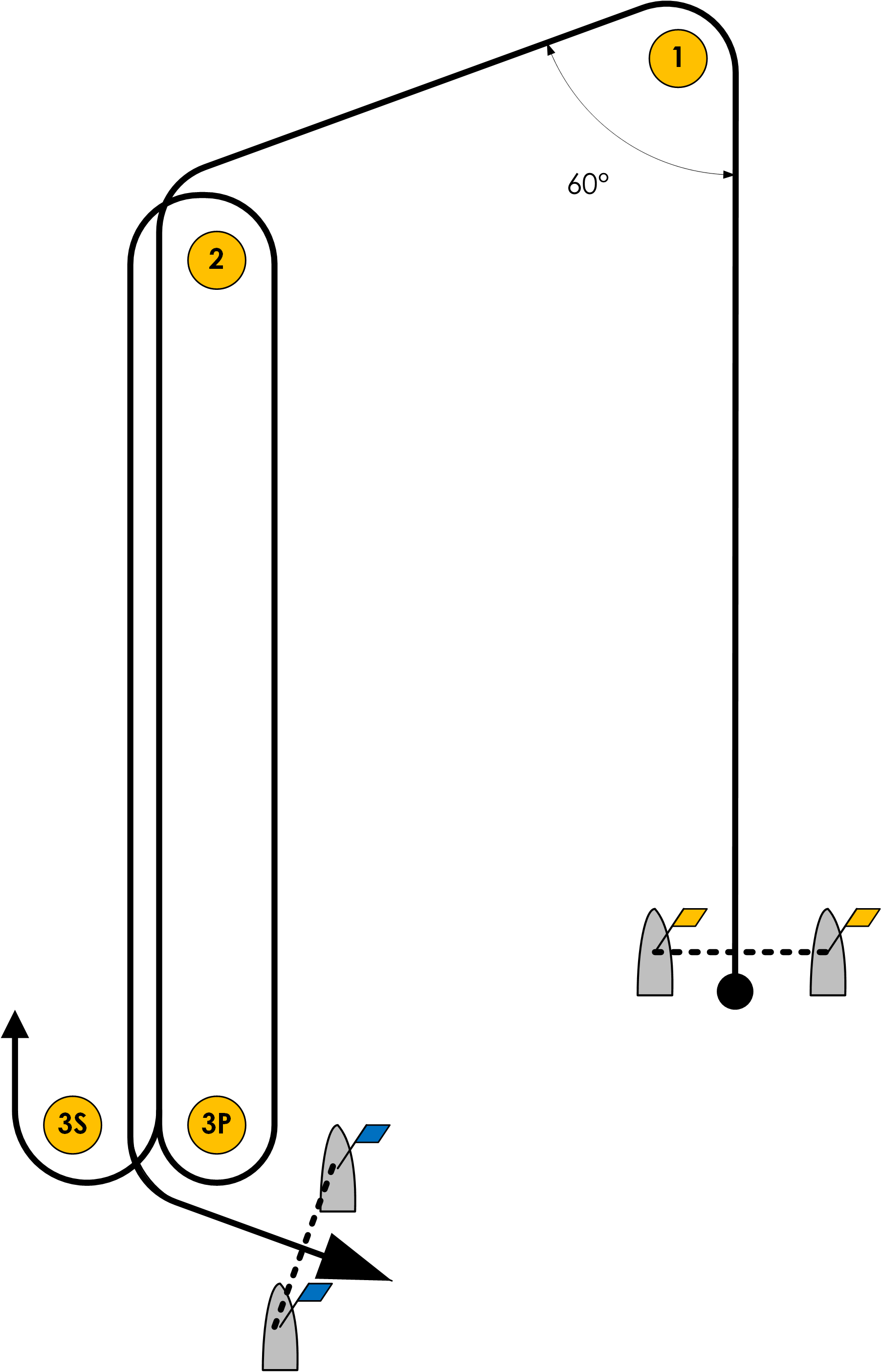
60° Trapezoid Outer Course (O)

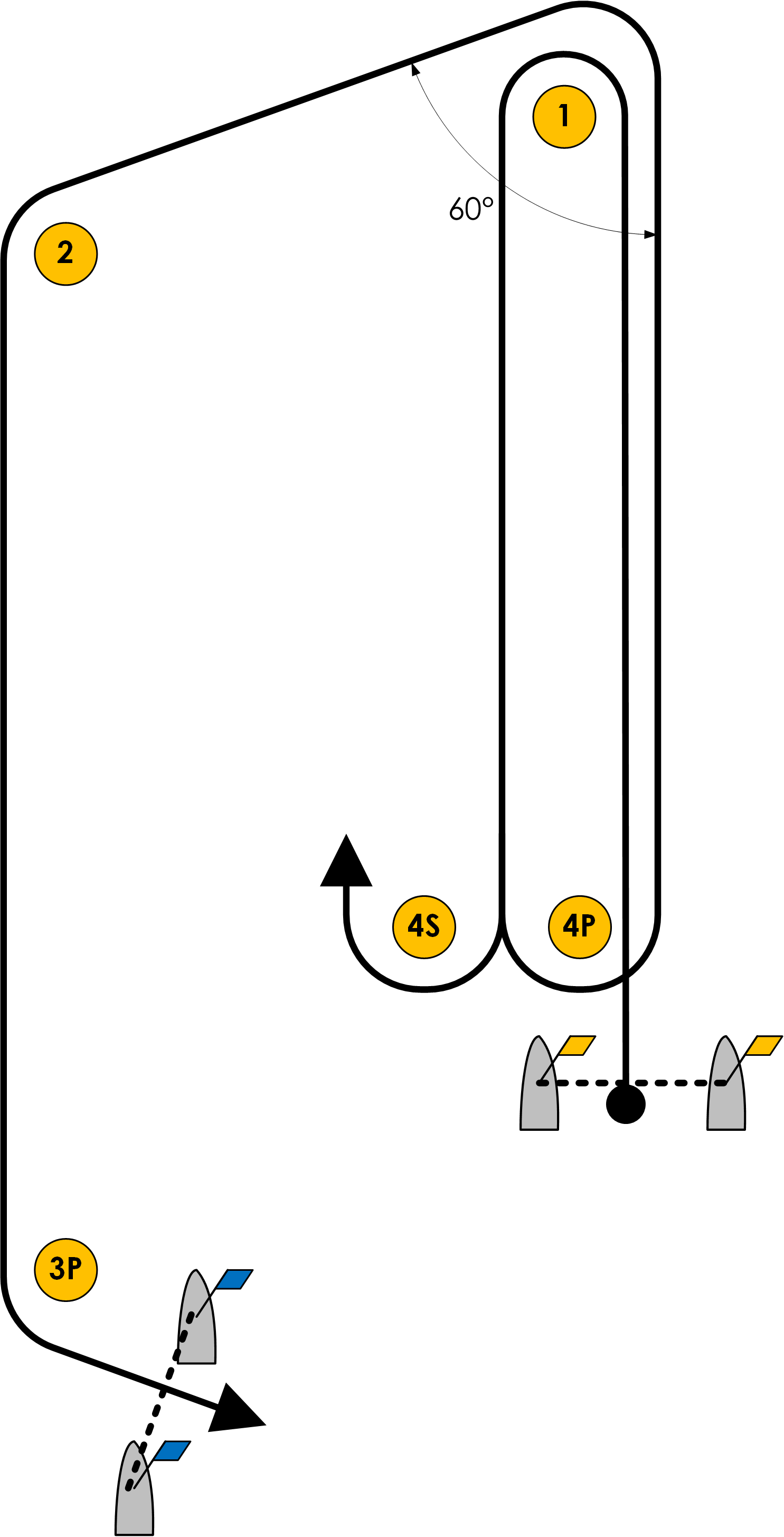
60° Trapezoid Inner Course (I)

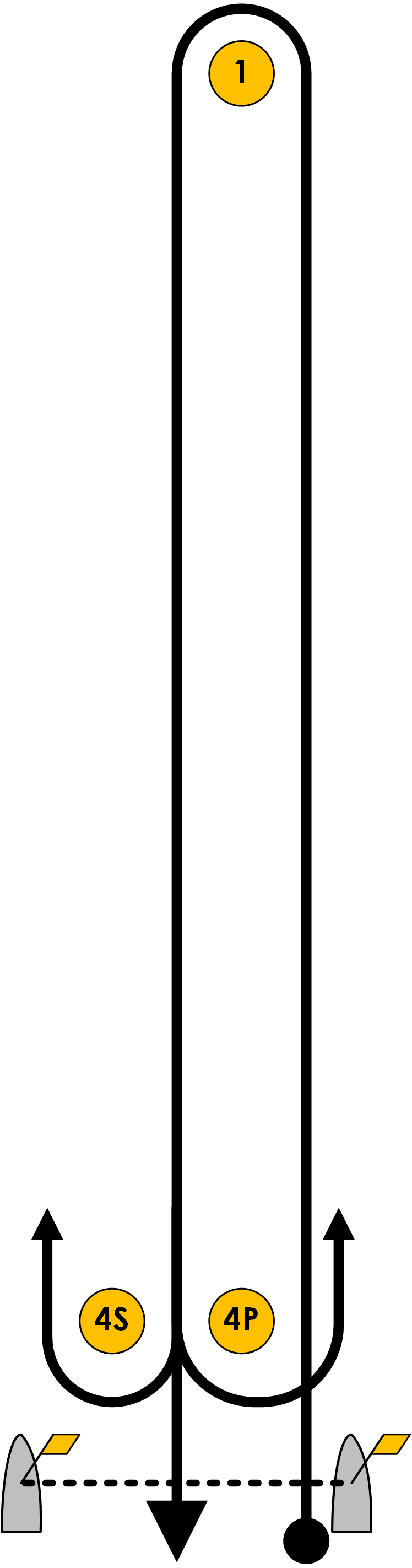
Windward - Leeward Course (W)

=== Outer courses ===
- O1: START – 1 – 2 – 3s/3p – 2 – 3p – FINISH
- O2: START – 1 – 2 – 3s/3p – 2 – 3s/3p – 2 – 3p – FINISH
- O3: START – 1 – 2 – 3s/3p – 2 – 3s/3p – 2 – 3s/3p – 2 – 3p – FINISH

=== Inner courses ===
- I1: START – 1 – 4s/4p – 1 – 2 – 3p – FINISH
- I2: START – 1 – 4s/4p – 1 – 4s/4p – 1 – 2 – 3p – FINISH
- I3: START – 1 – 4s/4p – 1 – 4s/4p – 1 – 4s/4p – 1 – 2 – 3p – FINISH

=== Windward-Leeward courses ===
- W2: START – 1 – 4s/4p – 1 – FINISH
- W3: START – 1 – 4s/4p – 1 – 4s/4p – 1 – FINISH
- W4: START – 1 – 4s/4p – 1 – 4s/4p – 1 – 4s/4p – 1 – FINISH

== Weather conditions ==
In the lead up to the Olympics many questioned the choice of Qingdao as a venue with very little predicted wind. During the races the wind was pretty light and quite unpredictable but the Women’s 470 competition was executed as scheduled.

== Final results ==
Rank	Country	Helmsman	Crew	Race 1		Race 2		Race 3		Race 4		Race 5		Race 6		Race 7		Race 8		Race 9		Race 10		Medalrace		Total	Total – discard
Rank	Country	Helmsman	Crew	Pos.	Pts.	Pos.	Pts.	Pos.	Pts.	Pos.	Pts.	Pos.	Pts.	Pos.	Pts.	Pos.	Pts.	Pos.	Pts.	Pos.	Pts.	Pos.	Pts.	Pos.	Pts.	Total	Total – discard
1st place, gold medalist(s)	Australia	Elise Rechichi	Tessa Parkinson	2	2.0	2	2.0	4	4.0	1	1.0	~~9~~	~~9.0~~	4	4.0	2	2.0	5	5.0	3	3.0	2	2.0	9	18.0	52.0	43.0
2nd place, silver medalist(s)	Netherlands	Marcelien de Koning	Lobke Berkhout	3	3.0	1	1.0	9	9.0	5	5.0	2	2.0	2	2.0	10	10.0	7	7.0	4	4.0	~~16~~	~~16.0~~	5	10.0	69.0	53.0
3rd place, bronze medalist(s)	Brazil	Fernanda Oliveira	Isabel Swan	11	11.0	~~16~~	~~16.0~~	5	5.0	10	10.0	7	7.0	6	6.0	6	6.0	2	2.0	7	7.0	4	4.0	1	2.0	76.0	60.0
4	Israel	Nike Kornecki	Vered Buskila	8	8.0	13	13.0	1	1.0	2	2.0	8	8.0	~~19~~	~~19.0~~	3	3.0	1	1.0	11	11.0	15	15.0	2	4.0	85.0	66.0
5	Italy	Giulia Conti	Giovanna Micol	14	14.0	7	7.0	6	6.0	3	3.0	6	6.0	11	11.0	4	4.0	~~19~~	~~19.0~~	12	12.0	6	6.0	3	6.0	94.0	75.0
6	Great Britain	Christina Bassadone	Saskia Clark	~~DSQ~~	~~20.0~~	8	8.0	3	3.0	4	4.0	15	15.0	13	13.0	8	8.0	3	3.0	15	15.0	5	5.0	4	8.0	102.0	82.0
7	Czech Republic	Lenka Šmídová	Lenka Mrzílková	6	6.0	4	4.0	~~12~~	~~12.0~~	11	11.0	11	11.0	5	5.0	11	11.0	11	11.0	9	9.0	1	1.0	7	14.0	95.0	83.0
8	Austria	Sylvia Vogl	Carolina Flatscher	9	9.0	~~DSQ~~	~~20.0~~	13	13.0	7	7.0	1	1.0	7	7.0	1	1.0	13	13.0	6	6.0	11	11.0	8	16.0	104.0	84.0
9	Germany	Stefanie Rothweiler	Vivien Kussatz	7	7.0	6	6.0	11	11.0	9	9.0	5	5.0	12	12.0	~~OCS~~	~~20.0~~	8	8.0	8	8.0	12	12.0	6	12.0	110.0	90.0
10	Spain	Natalia Vía Dufresne	Laia Tutzó	4	4.0	5	5.0	2	2.0	6	6.0	13	13.0	10	10.0	13	13.0	~~17~~	~~17.0~~	2	2.0	17	17.0	10	20.0	109.0	92.0
11	France	Ingrid Petitjean	Gwendolyn Lemaitre	1	1.0	11	11.0	16	16.0	8	8.0	~~17~~	~~17.0~~	9	9.0	9	9.0	9	9.0	13	13.0	9	9.0	-	-	102.0	85.0
12	United States	Amanda Clark	Sara Mergenthaler	12	12.0	12	12.0	10	10.0	14	14.0	4	4.0	~~17~~	~~17.0~~	7	7.0	6	6.0	17	17.0	7	7.0	-	-	106.0	89.0
13	Slovenia	Vesna Dekleva	Klara Maučec	~~DSQ~~	~~20.0~~	3	3.0	8	8.0	16	16.0	12	12.0	3	3.0	15	15.0	18	18.0	14	14.0	3	3.0	-	-	112.0	92.0
14	Japan	Ai Kondo	Naoko Kamata	13	13.0	~~15~~	~~15.0~~	14	14.0	15	15.0	14	14.0	1	1.0	12	12.0	10	10.0	1	1.0	13	13.0	-	-	108.0	93.0
15	Sweden	Therese Torgersson	Vendela Zachrisson-Santén	10	10.0	14	14.0	18	18.0	~~DSQ~~	~~20.0~~	19	19.0	8	8.0	5	5.0	14	14.0	5	5.0	8	8.0	-	-	121.0	101.0
16	Argentina	María Fernanda Sesto	Consuelo Monsegur	16	16.0	~~18~~	~~18.0~~	17	17.0	12	12.0	10	10.0	16	16.0	14	14.0	4	4.0	10	10.0	14	14.0	-	-	131.0	113.0
17	Switzerland	Emmanuelle Rol	Anne-Sophie Thilo	15	15.0	9	9.0	7	7.0	13	13.0	3	3.0	15	15.0	~~OCS~~	~~20.0~~	15	15.0	18	18.0	19	19.0	-	-	134.0	114.0
18	China	Wen Yimei	Yu Chunyan	5	5.0	10	10.0	19	19.0	17	17.0	16	16.0	14	14.0	~~OCS~~	~~20.0~~	12	12.0	16	16.0	10	10.0	-	-	139.0	119.0
19	Singapore	Toh Liying	Deborah Ong	17	17.0	17	17.0	15	15.0	18	18.0	18	18.0	18	18.0	~~OCS~~	~~20.0~~	16	16.0	19	19.0	18	18.0	-	-	176.0	156.0

Legend: – Qualified for next phase; DSQ – Disqualified; OCS – On the course side of the starting line;
Discard is crossed out and does not count for the overall result.

== Daily standings ==
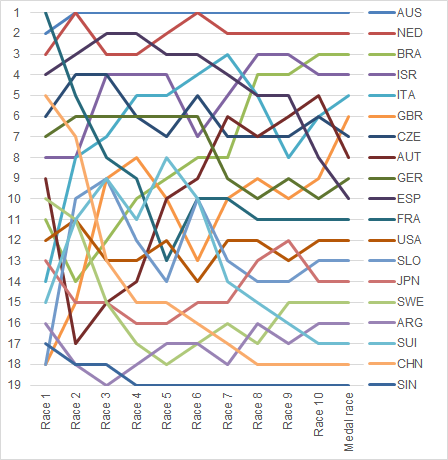
Graph showing the daily standings in the Women’s 470 during the 2008 Summer Olympics
