= Luke Patience =

British Olympic sailor (born 1986)

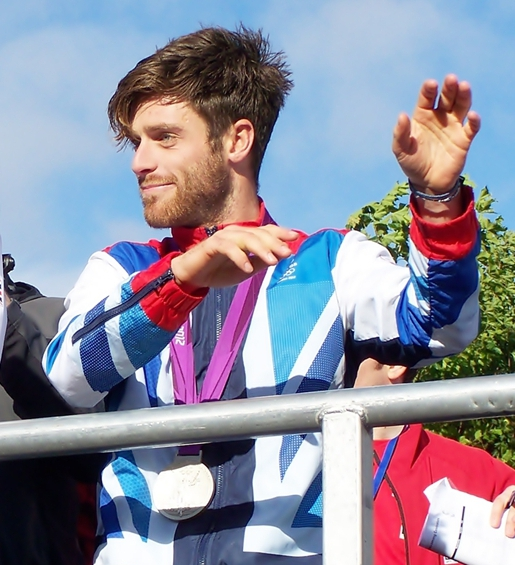
- September 2012 in Glasgow

Personal information
- Born: 4 August 1986 (age 39) Aberdeen, Scotland
- Height: 167 cm (5 ft 6 in)
- Weight: 59 kg (130 lb)

Sailing career
- Sport: Sailing
- Club: Royal Northern and Clyde Yacht Club
- Class(es): 470, 420, Optimist, Etchells
Medal record
Sailing
Representing Great Britain
Olympic Games
Silver medal – second place	2012 London	Men's 470
World Championships
Silver medal – second place	2009 Denmark	Men's 470
Silver medal – second place	2011 Perth	Men's 470
Bronze medal – third place	2006 Germany	Junior Men's 470
European Championships
Silver medal – second place	2014 Greece	Men's 470
Bronze medal – third place	2010 Turkey	Men's 470

Luke Patience (born 4 August 1986) is a British Olympic sailor. He competed with Stuart Bithell at the 2012 Summer Olympics, and the team won a silver medal.

== Personal life ==
Patience was born on 4 August 1986, in Aberdeen, Scotland.

== Sailing ==
Patience and Stuart Bithell were selected to compete for Great Britain at the 2012 Summer Olympics in London, United Kingdom in the men's 470 class ahead of Chris Grube and Nick Rogers. heading into the final race of the event the pair were guaranteed at least a silver medal but had to beat the leading Australian crew of Mathew Belcher and Malcolm Page with a boat between them to take gold. Patience and Bithell finished fourth in the race with the Australian's second, meaning they took the silver medal.

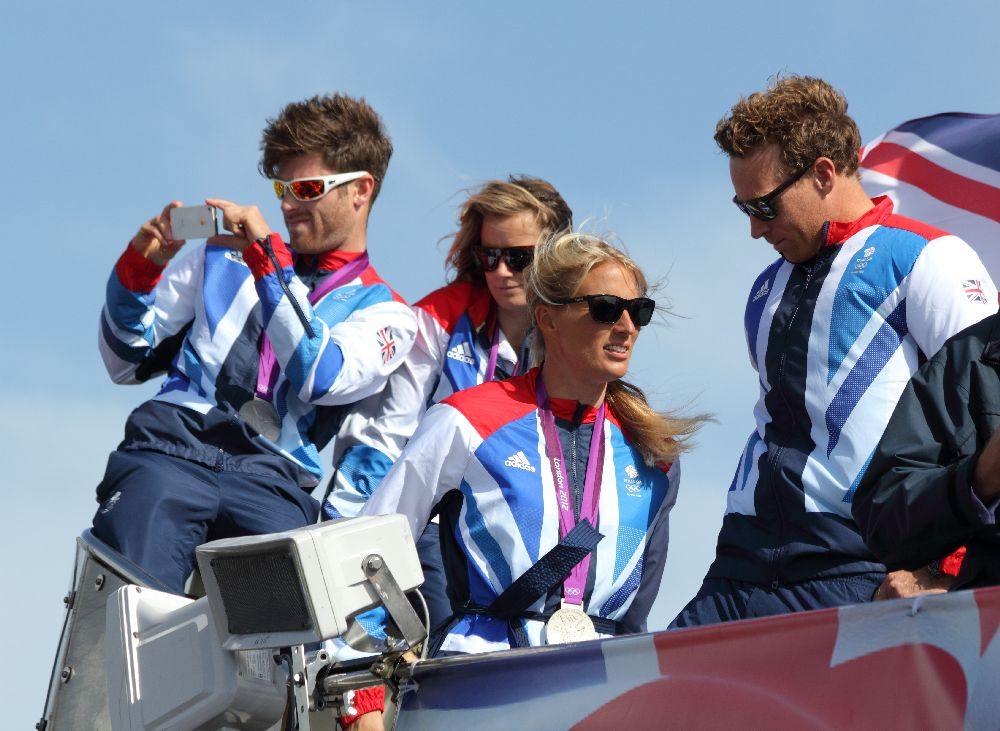
Luke Patience, Hannah Mills, Saskia Clark & Paul Goodison at Weymouth's Olympic Parade in 2012

In December 2012 Patience and Bithell ended their partnership, with Bithell moving to partner Grube in the 49er skiff class. Patience remained in the 470 class and joined up with Joe Glanfield who had previously won silver medals at the 2004 and 2008 Summer Olympics before choosing to retire. They won a silver medal at the 2013 European Sailing Championships behind Sofian Bouvet and Jeremie Mion of France. However, in February 2014, Glanfield again chose to retire.

Following Glanfield's retirement Patience joined up with crewman Elliot Willis. In July 2014 they won a gold medal at the 470 European Championship event held in Athens. They also won a silver medal at the test event for the 2016 Summer Olympics in Rio de Janeiro, Brazil and finished in fourth place at the 2014 ISAF Sailing World Championships. Based on these results the pair were selected to represent Great Britain at the 2016 Summer Olympics in the men's 470 class.

In March 2016 Patience was forced to find a new partner after Willis was diagnosed with bowel cancer and had to withdraw from the Olympics; he teamed up with Chris Grube and had to requalify for the Olympics. They took part in a World Cup event at Hyères in France, despite suffering a black flag disqualification in one race they finished tenth overall. In May 2016 Patience and Grube were confirmed as the Great Britain team's entry for the men's 470 in Rio.

Patience and Grube have again qualified to represent Great Britain at the 2020 Summer Olympics in the 470 class.
