= Lemström =

Lemström is a surname. Notable people with the surname include:

- Annika Lemström (born 1964), Finnish sailor
- Bettina Lemström (born 1966), Finnish sailor
- Rainer Lemström (1931–2007), Finnish politician
- Selim Lemström (1838–1904), Finnish geophysicist
