= 1994 470 European Championships =

The 1994 470-European-Sailing-Championship was held between June 5 and 12 1994. It was discharged before Röbel.

And was extended in both a men's and a women's competition 470-boat class, in which at the men the Italians Ivaldi / Ivaldi and among women the Spaniards Zabell / via Dufresne after seven / ten races the European title won.

== Results ==
=== Men ===
Place	Land	Athlete	Points
1	ITA	Matteo Ivaldi / Michele Ivaldi	18.75
2	GBR	John Merricks / Ian Walker	28.00
3	ESP	Jordi Calafat / Francisco Sanches	30.25

=== Women ===
Place	Land	Athlete	Points
1	ESP	Theresa Zabell / Begonia via Dufresne	29.25
2	GER	Tanja Stemler / Susanne Bergmann	39.75
3	GER	Susanne Bauckholt / Katrin Adlkofer	42.25
