= Shimshon Brokman =

Israeli sailor

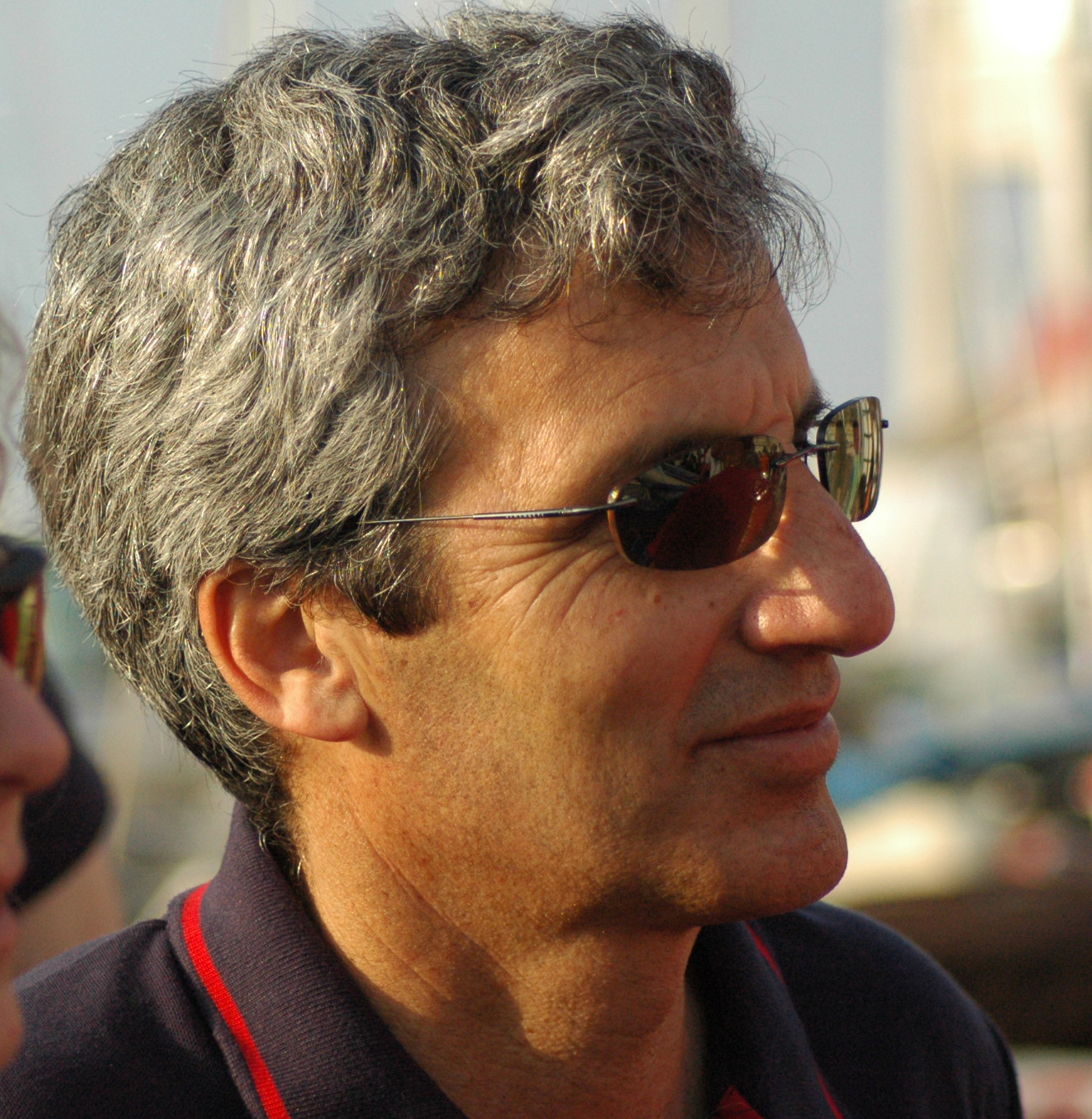
- Brokman in 2008

Personal information
- Native name: שמשון ברוקמן
- Nationality: Israeli
- Born: 16 September 1957 (age 68) Tel Aviv, Israel
- Height: 5 ft 6 in (168 cm)
- Weight: 154 lb (70 kg)

Sailing career
- Sport: Sailing
- Classes: 420; 470
Medal record
Sailing
Representing Israel
420 International Yacht Racing Union Youth Sailing World Championship
Gold medal – first place	1972 West Germany	420
Bronze medal – third place	1974	420
420 World Championships
Gold medal – first place	1980 Quiberon, France	420
420 European Championships
Gold medal – first place	1976 Ireland	420
470 World Championships
Bronze medal – third place	1983 Weymouth	470
470 European Championships
Bronze medal – third place	1977 Austria	470
Silver medal – second place	1978 Portugal	470
Gold medal – first place	1979 Spain	470
Silver medal – second place	1982 Hungary	470

Shimshon Brokman (also "Brockman"; Hebrew: שמשון ברוקמן; born 16 September 1957) is an Israeli former Olympic sailor. Brokman and Eitan Friedlander won the 1972 420 International Yacht Racing Union (IYRU) Youth Sailing World Championship in West Germany, the gold medals in the 1979 470 European Championships in Spain and the 1980 420 World Championship in France, and a bronze medal in 1983 at the 470 World Championships.

== Early and personal life ==
He was born in Kibbutz Rosh Hanikra, Israel, and is Jewish. Brokman's father represented Israel in two world championship sailing competitions. Brokman lived in Haifa, Israel.

Brokman graduated from the Hebrew Reali School in Haifa, Israel, in 1975, received his B.Sc. in Aeronautical Engineering from Technion – Israel Institute of Technology in Haifa in 1983, his M.Sc. in Aeronautical Engineering from Technion in 1987, and an Executive MBA from Tel Aviv University in 2006. In 1984 he noted:

"You don’t have to be an aeronautical engineer to be a good sailor, but it helps me understand the dynamics of the sailing. For example, when the boat is moving the physics on the surface of the boat has to be re-defined again and again. I find that much of what I learned at the Technion can, in some way, be applied to sailing and has helped me make [fewer] mistakes."

He is married, with three children.

== Sailing career ==
In 1972, Brokman and Eitan Friedlander won the 420 International Yacht Racing Union (IYRU) Youth Sailing World Championship in West Germany. In 1974 they won the bronze medal in the same event. Brokman and Eitan Friedlander won the 1976 European 420 Championship in Ireland.

The two of them then won the bronze medal in the 1977 470 European Championships in Austria, the silver medal in the 1978 European 470 Championship in Portugal, the gold medal in the 1979 European 470 Championship in Spain, and the silver medal in the 1982 European 470 Championship in Hungary.

In the 1980 420 World Championships in Quiberon, France, Brokman and Eitan Friedlander won the gold medal. In the 1980 470 World Championships, they came in 5th.

Brockman and Friedlander were set to compete in the 470 sailing event at the 1980 Moscow Olympics, but did not because Israel joined in the US-led boycott of the Olympics prompted by the Soviet Union's invasion of Afghanistan. In 1983, they won a bronze medal at the 470 World Championships in Weymouth, England.

Brokman competed for Israel at the 1984 Summer Olympics in Los Angeles, California, at the age of 26 in Sailing. In the Men's 470 Mixed Two Person Dinghy, he and Eitan Friedlander came in 8th out of 28 teams. When he competed in the Olympics he was 5 feet 6 inches (168 cm) tall, and weighed 154 pounds (70 kg).

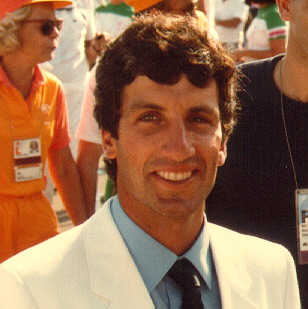
Shimshon at the '84 Olympic games in Los Angeles

At the 1991 470 European Championship in Norway, he and Guy Brockman came in 30th.

== Career after sailing ==
He has worked for Israel Electric Corporation since 1988, from 2006 as Head of the Fuel Management Department.
