= Eitan Friedlander =

Israeli sailor

Personal information
- Native name: איתן פרידלנדר
- Nationality: Israel
- Born: September 21, 1958 (age 67) Kibbutz Rosh Hanikra, Israel
- Height: 6 ft 1.5 in (187 cm)
- Weight: 161 lb (73 kg)

Sailing career
- Sport: Sailing
- Classes: 420; 470
Medal record
Sailing
Representing Israel
420 International Yacht Racing Union Youth Sailing World Championship
Gold medal – first place	1972 West Germany	420
Bronze medal – third place	1974	420
420 World Championships
Gold medal – first place	1980 Quiberon, France	420
420 European Championships
Gold medal – first place	1976 Ireland	420
470 World Championships
Bronze medal – third place	1983 Weymouth	470
470 European Championships
Bronze medal – third place	1977 Austria	470
Silver medal – second place	1978 Portugal	470
Gold medal – first place	1979 Spain	470
Silver medal – second place	1982 Hungary	470

Eitan Friedlander (also "Fridlander"; Hebrew: איתן פרידלנדר; born September 21, 1958) is an Israeli former Olympic sailor. Friedlander and Shimshon Brokman won the 1972 420 International Yacht Racing Union (IYRU) Youth Sailing World Championship in West Germany, the gold medals in the 1979 470 European Championships in Spain and the 1980 420 World Championship in France, and a bronze medal in 1983 at the 470 World Championships.

He was born in Kibbutz Rosh Hanikra, Israel, and is Jewish.

== Sailing career ==
In 1972, Friedlander and Shimshon Brokman won the 420 International Yacht Racing Union (IYRU) Youth Sailing World Championship in West Germany. In 1974 they won the bronze medal in the same event. Friedlander and Brokman won the 1976 European 420 Championship in Ireland.

The two of them then won the bronze medal in the 1977 470 European Championships in Austria, the silver medal in the 1978 European 470 Championship in Portugal, the gold medal in the 1979 European 470 Championship in Spain, and the silver medal in the 1982 European 470 Championship in Hungary.

In the 1980 420 World Championships in Quiberon, France, Brokman and Eitan Friedlander won the gold medal. In the 1980 470 World Championships, they came in 5th.

Friedlander and Brokman were set to compete in the 470 sailing event at the 1980 Moscow Olympics, but did not because Israel joined in the US-led boycott of the Olympics prompted by the Soviet Union's invasion of Afghanistan.

Friedlander competed for Israel at the 1984 Summer Olympics in Los Angeles, California, at the age of 26 in Sailing. In the Men's 470 Mixed Two Person Dinghy, he and Brokman came in 8th out of 28 teams. When he competed in the Olympics he was 6 ft 1.5 in (187 cm) tall and weighed 161 lb (73 kg).
