= Leon Wróbel =

Polish sailor (1954–2025)

Personal information
- Nationality: Polish
- Born: 6 April 1954 Nieporęt, Poland
- Died: 1 February 2025 (aged 70)
- Height: 1.83 m (6 ft 0 in)

Sailing career
- Sport: Sailing
- Class: 470
Medal record
Sailing
Representing Poland
470 European Championships
Bronze medal – third place	1976 Hellerup
Bronze medal – third place	1978 Cascais
Bronze medal – third place	1979 Dénia
- Updated on 2025-02-04

Leon Wróbel (6 April 1954 – 1 February 2025) was a Polish sailor. Wróbel was a European champion and 1980 Moscow Olympics athlete.

== Biography ==
Wróbel was a three-time bronze-medallist at the 470 European Championships (1976, 1978 and 1979), as well as being the Polish national champion in the years 1974–76 and 1978–83.

He represented Poland at the 1980 Moscow Olympics finishing in 5th place in the 470 class together with Tomasz Stocki.

Wróbel died on 1 February 2025, at the age of 70.
