= Vivien Kussatz =

German sailor (born 1972)

Personal information
- Nationality: German
- Born: 15 August 1972 (age 53) Bad Saarow, Brandenburg, East Germany
- Height: 1.71 m (5 ft 7 1/2 in)
- Weight: 64 kg (141 lb)

Sailing career
- Sport: Sailing
- Club: Spandauer Yacht-Club
- Coached by: Alberto García (ESP)
- Class: Dinghy
Medal record
Women's sailing
Representing Germany
European Championships
Gold medal – first place	2006 Balatonfüred	470
Gold medal – first place	2007 Thessaloniki	470

Vivien Kussatz (born 15 August 1972) is a German former sailor, who specialized in two-person dinghy (470) class. Together with her partner and two-time Olympian Stefanie Rothweiler, she won two gold medals at the European Championships (2006 and 2007) and was eventually named one of the country's top sailors in the double-handed dinghy for the 2008 Summer Olympics, finishing in ninth place. A member of Spandauer Yacht-Club in Berlin, Kussatz trained most of her competitive career under the tutelage of her Spanish-born personal coach Alberto García.

Kussatz competed for the German sailing squad, as a crew member in the women's 470 class, at the 2008 Summer Olympics in Beijing. Building up to their Olympic selection, she and skipper Rothweiler finished a credible fourteenth in the gold fleet to secure one of the twelve quota places offered at the 2007 ISAF Worlds in Cascais, Portugal. The German duo entered the final race with a myriad of top-ten marks recorded throughout the series. A sixth-place finish at the end of the regatta, however, witnessed their medal chances fade, dragging the duo farther to the back of the fleet in ninth overall with 90 net points.
