= Tomasz Stocki =

Polish sailor

Personal information
- Nationality: Poland
- Born: 7 March 1953 (age 73) Warsaw, Poland
- Height: 180 cm (5 ft 11 in)
- Weight: 74 kg (163 lb)

Sport
- Sport: Sailing
- Club: AZS Warszawa
Medal record
Sailing
Representing Poland
470 European Championships
Bronze medal – third place	1976 Hellerup
Bronze medal – third place	1978 Cascais
Bronze medal – third place	1979 Dénia

Tomasz Stocki (born 7 March 1953) is a Polish sailor. He sailed alongside Leon Wróbel in the 470 at the 1980 Oympics, where they came 5th together with Wróbel. He won bronze at the 1976, 1978 and 1979 470 European Championships.
