= Anne-Sophie Thilo =

Swiss sailor

Personal information
- Nickname: Anso
- Nationality: Switzerland
- Born: 3 December 1987 (age 38) Pully, Vaud, Switzerland
- Height: 1.79 m (5 ft 10 1/2 in)
- Weight: 66 kg (146 lb)

Sailing career
- Sport: Sailing
- Club: Club Nautique de Pully
- Coached by: Nicolas Novara (FRA)
- Class: Dinghy
Medal record
Women's sailing
Representing Switzerland
European Championships
Silver medal – second place	2008 Riva del Garda	470

Anne-Sophie Thilo (born 3 December 1987) is a Swiss former sailor, who specialized in the two-person dinghy (470) class. Together with her partner Emmanuelle Rol, she won a silver medal at the Europeans in Riva del Garda, Italy and was named one of the country's top sailors in the double-handed dinghy for the Summer Olympics a few months later in Beijing, finishing in a lowly seventeenth place. A member of her native Pully's local sailing club (French: Club Nautique de Pully), Thilo trained most of her sporting career under the federation's head coach for 470, French-born Nicolas Novara.

Thilo competed for the Swiss sailing squad, as a crew member in the women's 470 class, at the 2008 Summer Olympics in Beijing. She and skipper Rol topped the Swiss Sailing Federation's selection criteria for a coveted spot on the Olympic team, based on their cumulative scores attained in a series of international regattas, including their runner-up finish at the Europeans a few months earlier. The Swiss duo seized their advantage at the initial half of the series by taking the top-ten spots each in races 2 to 4, but a series of unanticipated technical errors towards the final legs pushed both Thilo and Rol to the near end of the fleet, sitting them in a lowly seventeenth overall with 114 net points.

When she and Rol split their partnership in late 2008, Thilo teamed up with several Swiss sailors at various international regattas until her sporting career came to a fruitful end in 2013. Thilo currently served as a chairman and sports development consultant for the Athletes' Council at the 2020 Winter Youth Olympics in Lausanne.
