= Laia Tutzó =

Spanish sailor (born 1980)

Personal information
- Full name: Laia Lluïsa Tutzó Moreno
- Nationality: Spain
- Born: 9 October 1980 (age 46) Barcelona, Spain
- Height: 1.65 m (5 ft 5 in)
- Weight: 55 kg (121 lb)

Sailing career
- Sport: Sailing
- Club: Club Nautic Port d'Aro
- Coached by: Eneko Fernández
- Classes: Dinghy and keelboat
Medal record
Women's sailing
Representing Spain
World Championships
Gold medal – first place	2002 Brunnen	Yngling
European Championships
Bronze medal – third place	2006 Balatonfüred	470

Laia Lluïsa Tutzó Moreno (Note: In this Spanish name, the first or paternal surname is Tutzó and the second or maternal family name is Moreno.) (born 9 October 1980) is a Spanish former sailor, who specialized in the two-person dinghy (470) and Yngling classes. Together with her partner Natalia Vía Dufresne, a four-time Olympian and a double silver medalist, she was named one of the country's top sailors in the double-handed dinghy for the 2008 Summer Olympics, rounding out the top-ten crews in the final race. Outside her Olympic career, Tutzó helped the Azón sisters Monica and Sandra solidify a golden finish at the inaugural Yngling Worlds in 2002, before switching her yachting duty to pair up with Vía Dufresne and then Marina Gallego in the 470. A member of Port d'Aro Nautical Club in the outskirts of Barcelona, Tutzó trained most of her sporting career under the tutelage of Eneko Fernández, one of the federation's coaches in the double-handed dinghy.

Tutzó competed for the Spanish sailing squad, as a crew member in the women's 470 class, at the 2008 Summer Olympics in Beijing. She and skipper Vía Dufresne topped the selection criteria by an effortless, 82-point edge over the other tandem Gallego and Támara Echegoyen to lock the country's 470 berth among the females for the Games at the class-associated Worlds nearly eight months earlier in Melbourne, Australia. The Spanish duo entered the final race with a couple of runner-up marks recorded throughout the series, both of which came close to their provisional fourth and ninth-leg triumph, respectively, by the narrowest of margins. A costly penalty turn for an incident at the final upwind mark, however, pushed both Tutzó and Vía Dufresne to the back and out of the medals, sitting them in the tenth overall spot with 92 net points.
