= Petri Leskinen =

Finnish sailor

Personal information
- Nationality: Finnish
- Born: 9 June 1966 (age 58); Vaasa, Finland

Sport
- Sport: Sailing

Petri Leskinen (born 9 June 1966) is a Finnish sailor. He competed at the 1992 Summer Olympics, the 1996 Summer Olympics, and the 2000 Summer Olympics.

470
470 World Championships
Year	Place	Medal	Class
World Championship 1992	Rota (Spain)	Bronze	470
World Championship 1997	Tel Aviv (Israel)	Gold	470
470 European Championships
Year	Place	Medal	Class
European Championship 1995	Båstad (Sweden)	Silver	470
European Championship 1997	Nieuwpoort (Belgium)	Bronze	470
