= Emmanuelle Rol =

Swiss sailor

Personal information
- Nickname: Manu
- Nationality: Switzerland; France
- Born: 6 August 1986 (age 39) Pully, Vaud, Switzerland
- Height: 1.69 m (5 ft 7 in)
- Weight: 52 kg (115 lb)

Sailing career
- Sport: Sailing
- Club: Club Nautique de Pully
- Coached by: Nicolas Novara (FRA)
- Class: Dinghy
Medal record
Women's sailing
European Championships
Representing France
Gold medal – first place	2010 Istanbul	470
Representing Switzerland
Silver medal – second place	2008 Riva del Garda	470

Emmanuelle Rol (born 6 August 1986) is a Swiss-born French former sailor, who specialized in the two-person dinghy (470) class. Together with her partner Anne-Sophie Thilo, she was named one of the country's top sailors in the double-handed dinghy for the 2008 Summer Olympics, finishing in a lowly seventeenth place. Outside her Olympic career, she collected a total of two medals (a gold and a silver) under each different banner at the European Championships (2008 and 2010). A member of her native Pully's local sailing club (French: Club Nautique de Pully), Rol trained most of her sporting career under the federation's head coach for 470, French-born Nicolas Novara.

Rol competed for the Swiss sailing squad, as a skipper in the women's 470 class, at the 2008 Summer Olympics in Beijing. She and crew member Thilo topped the Swiss Sailing Federation's selection criteria for a coveted spot on the Olympic team, based on their cumulative scores attained in a series of international regattas, including their runner-up finish at the Europeans a few months earlier. The Swiss duo seized their advantage at the initial half of the series by taking the top-ten spots each in races 2 to 4, but a series of unanticipated technical errors towards the final legs pushed both Rol and Thilo to the near end of the fleet, sitting them in a lowly seventeenth overall with 114 net points.

Shortly after the Games, the Swiss duo announced their split from 470. When she competed for France two years later, Rol and her new partner Hélène Defrance collected their composure and then sailed victoriously ahead of their chief medal rivals for a golden finish at the Europeans in Istanbul, Turkey.
