= Tanguy Cariou =

French yacht racer

Tanguy Cariou (born 21 April 1973) is a French yacht racer who competed in the 2000 Summer Olympics.

He sailed with Areva Challenge at the 2007 Louis Vuitton Cup, and has also raced with Alinghi and the Groupama Sailing Team in the Extreme Sailing Series.
