= Lucas Zellmer =

German yacht racer (born 1977)

Lucas Zellmer (born 3 December 1977 in Berlin) is a German former yacht racer who competed in the men's 470 at the 2004 Summer Olympics, finishing 11th.
