= Giulia Conti =

Italian sailor

Personal information
- Nationality: Italian
- Born: 4 November 1985 (age 40) Rome, Italy
- Height: 1.73 m (5 ft 8 in)
- Weight: 63 kg (139 lb)

Sailing career
- Sport: Sailing
- Club: Canottieri Aniene
- Class(es): Yngling, 470, 49er FX
Medal record
Representing Italy
World Championships
Silver medal – second place	2008 Mordialloc	470 class
Bronze medal – third place	2010 Hague	470 class
Bronze medal – third place	2014 Santander	49er FX

Giulia Conti (born 4 November 1985 in Rome) is an Italian sailor. She has competed at several Olympic Games and in 2024 she led a team to victory of the inaugural Women's America's Cup.

== Biography ==
She has competed in four successive Summer Olympic Games.

Conti is a member of the Circolo Canottieri Aniene sailing club.

She made her Olympic debut at 19, at the 2004 Athens Olympics, sailing in the yngling class with Alessandra Marenzi and Angela Baroni. Subsequently, she represented Italy at Beijing 2008 (with Giovanna Micol in the Women's 470 class), at London 2012 (again with Micol in the 470 class) and Rio 2016 (with Francesca Clapcich in the 49erFX class). Her results include two fifth places in the 470 and another fifth place in the 49erFX.

In 2008, she and Micol won silver at the 470 World Championships.

Since she has competed with Francesca Clapcich. The pair scored numerous successes in the newly formed class 49er FX class, including 2015 victory in Italian, European and World Championships. On 27 October 2015 Conti and Clapcich were awarded the Golden Collar sporting merit award, the highest honor conferred by CONI.

In 2016, they came second at the European Championships.

In October 2024, Giulia Conti became the first Women's Americas Cup Champion, winning the 1st PUIG Women's America Cup in Barcelona as Captain of the Luna Rossa Prada Pirelli Team representing Circolo della Vela Sicilia in a historic match race against the Athena Pathway Team. The race was set inside the 37th Louis Vuitton America's Cup in Barcelona, on the same race course with AC40's.

== Achievements ==
Year	Competition	Venue	Position	Event	Notes
2004	Olympic Games	Athens	14th	Yngling class	
2008	Olympic Games	Beijing	5th	470 class	
2012	Olympic Games	London	5th	470 class	
2016	Olympic Games	Rio	5th	49 FX class	
2024	Women's America's Cup	Barcelona	1st		

== See also ==
- Italy at the 2012 Summer Olympics
