= Vlada Ilyenko =

Russian sailor

Personal information
- Nationality: Russian
- Born: 17 March 1976 (age 49); Bălți, Moldova

Sport
- Sport: Sailing

Vlada Ilyenko (born 17 March 1976) is a Russian sailor. She competed in the women's 470 event at the 2004 Summer Olympics.
