= Elisabetta Saccheggiani =

Italian yacht racer

Elisabetta Saccheggiani (born 5 February 1984) is an Italian yacht racer who competed in the 2004 Summer Olympics.
