= Christina Pinnow =

German sailor

Personal information
- Nationality: German
- Born: 8 July 1967 (age 59) Potsdam, East Germany

Sport
- Sport: Sailing

Christina Pinnow (born 8 July 1967) is a German sailor. She competed in the women's 470 event at the 1992 Summer Olympics.
