= Birgitta Bengtsson =

Swedish sailor (born 1965)

Medal record

Sailing

Representing Sweden

Olympic Games
Silver medal – second place	1988 Seoul	470 class

Birgitta Bengtsson (born 16 May 1965) is a Swedish sailor. She won a silver medal in the 470 class at the 1988 Summer Olympics with Marit Söderström.
