= Jürgen Brietzke =

German sailor (born 1959)

Personal information
- Nationality: German
- Born: 31 May 1959 (age 66) Sternberg, Germany

Sport
- Sport: Sailing

Jürgen Brietzke (born 31 May 1959) is a German sailor. He competed in the men's 470 event at the 1988 Summer Olympics.
