= Odile Barre =

French yacht racer

Odile Barre (born 11 April 1962) is a French offshore yacht racer and sailor who competed in the 1992 Summer Olympics.
