= Nataliya Gaponovich =

Russian sailor

Personal information
- Nationality: Russian
- Born: 25 October 1972 (age 52); Nikopol, Ukraine

Sport
- Sport: Sailing

Nataliya Gaponovich (born 25 October 1972) is a Russian sailor. She competed in the women's 470 event at the 2004 Summer Olympics.
