= Patricia Guerra =

Spanish sailor (born 1965)

Personal information
- Full name: Patricia Guerra Cabrera
- Born: 21 July 1965 (age 61) Las Palmas de Gran Canaria, Las Palmas

Sailing career
- Sport: Sailing
- Class: 470
Medal record
Women's sailing
Representing Spain
Olympic Games
Gold medal – first place	1992 Barcelona	470 class

Patricia Guerra Cabrera (born 21 July 1965 in Las Palmas de Gran Canaria, Las Palmas) is a Spanish sailor who won gold medal at the 1992 Summer Olympics in Barcelona. She did so in the 470 class alongside Theresa Zabell. She also competed at the 1988 Summer Olympics, finishing in tenth place.
