= Mikhail Krutikov =

Russian sailor

Personal information
- Nationality: Russian
- Born: 30 December 1967 (age 57); Lipetsk, Russia

Sport
- Sport: Sailing

Mikhail Krutikov (born 30 December 1967) is a Russian sailor. He competed at the 2000 Summer Olympics and the 2004 Summer Olympics.
