= Ekkehard Schulz (sailor) =

German sailor

Personal information
- Nationality: German
- Born: 10 June 1958 (age 66); Halle, Germany

Sport
- Sport: Sailing

Ekkehard Schulz (born 10 June 1958) is a German sailor. He competed in the men's 470 event at the 1988 Summer Olympics.
