= Gildas Philippe =

French yacht racer

Gildas Philippe (born 4 February 1973) is a French yacht racer who competed in the 2000 Summer Olympics and in the 2004 Summer Olympics.
