= Thierry Peponnet =

French sailor (born 1959)

Medal record

Sailing

Representing France

Olympic Games
Gold medal – first place	1988 Seoul	470 class
Bronze medal – third place	1984 Los Angeles	470 class

Thierry Peponnet (born 7 September 1959) is a French sailor and Olympic champion.

He won a gold medal in the 470 class at the 1988 Summer Olympics in Seoul, together with Luc Pillot. They received bronze medals in 1984.

He was involved with Le Défi in the 1995 Louis Vuitton Cup and 2000 Louis Vuitton Cup, and Areva Challenge at the 2007 Louis Vuitton Cup.
