= Marc Laurent =

French yacht racer

Marc Laurent (born 29 May 1947) is a French yacht racer who competed in the 1976 Summer Olympics.
