= Susanne Ward =

Danish sailor (born 1974)

Personal information
- Nationality: Danish
- Born: 19 April 1974 (age 52) Hørsholm, Denmark
- Height: 171 cm (5 ft 7 in)
- Weight: 58 kg (128 lb)

Sailing career
- Sport: Sailing
- Club: Rungsted Kyst Sejlklub; Royal Danish Yacht Club
- Classes: 470, Optimist, Elliott 6m, Yngling

Susanne Ward (born 19 April 1974) is a Danish sailor. She competed at the 1992, 1996, 2000, and the 2004 Summer Olympics.
