= Maria Quarra =

Italian yacht racer (born 1965)

Maria Quarra (born 26 January 1965) is an Italian yacht racer who competed in the 1992 Summer Olympics.
