= Peter von Koskull =

Finnish sailor

Personal information
- Nationality: Finnish
- Born: 19 January 1963 (age 62); Helsinki, Finland

Sport
- Sport: Sailing

Peter von Koskull (born 19 January 1963) is a Finnish sailor. He competed at the 1984 Summer Olympics and the 1988 Summer Olympics.
