= Marit Söderström =

Swedish sailor

Personal information
- Full name: Marit Kjellsdotter Söderström
- Nationality: Swedish
- Born: 25 October 1962 (age 63) Västerås, Sweden
- Height: 171 cm (5 ft 7 in)

Sailing career
- Sport: Sailing
- Club: Jollekappseglarna Västerås
- Classes: Laser Radial, 470
Medal record
Sailing
Representing Sweden
Olympic Games
Silver medal – second place	1988 Seoul	470 class
470 World Championships
Gold medal – first place	1988 Haifa	470
Radial World Championships
Gold medal – first place	1980 Kingston	Laser Radial
Gold medal – first place	1985 Halmstad	Laser Radial
Women's World Championships
Gold medal – first place	1983	Laser Radial
Gold medal – first place	1982	Laser Radial
Gold medal – first place	1981	Laser Radial
Gold medal – first place	1979	Laser Radial

Marit Kjellsdotter Söderström (born 25 October 1962) is a Swedish sailor. She won a silver medal in the 470 class at the 1988 Summer Olympics with Birgitta Bengtsson with a final total of 61.0 points.

Born in Västerås, Söderström represented Jollekappseglarna Västerås.
