= Aloïse Retornaz =

French sailor

Personal information
- Born: 3 February 1994 (age 32) Brest, France

Sailing career
- Sport: Sailing
Medal record
Sailing
Representing France
Olympic Games
Bronze medal – third place	2020 Tokyo	Women's 470
470 World Championships
Bronze medal – third place	2019 Enoshima	Women's 470
Military World Games
Silver medal – second place	2019 Wuhan	Women's 470
470 European Championships
Gold medal – first place	2019 Sanremo	Women's 470
Gold medal – first place	2021 Vilamoura	Women's 470

Aloïse Retornaz (born 3 February 1994) is a French sailor.

== Early life and education ==
Retornaz was born in Brest. She studied at ISEN Brest.

== Career ==
Retornaz and Camille Lecointre won the 470 European Championships in 2019 and 2021. They also won the silver medal in the 470 event at the 2019 Military World Games in Wuhan, and won the final of the Sailing World Cup in Marseille. Alongside Lecointre, Retornaz was awarded the 2019 Sailor of the Year award by the French Sailing Federation. Lecointre and Retornaz won the bronze medal at the 2020 Summer Olympics in the women's 470 event. At the start of the 2025 sailing season, Retornaz transferred from the 470 to the Nacra 17 class following the removal of the 470 class from the Olympic Games cycle, winning a silver medal in the World Championships in Quiberon in May 2026.
