= Michaëla Ward-Meehan =

Danish sailor (born 1970)

Michaëla Meehan
Personal information
- Full name: Lise Michaëla Meehan
- Nationality: Danish
- Born: Lise Michaëla Ward; 17 December 1970 (age 55) Gentofte, Denmark
- Height: 173 cm (5 ft 8 in)
- Weight: 63 kg (139 lb)

Sailing career
- Sport: Sailing
- Club: Royal Danish Yacht Club
- Class: 470

Lise Michaëla Meehan née Ward (born 17 December 1970) is a Danish sailor. She competed at the 1996 Summer Olympics, the 2000 Summer Olympics, and the 2004 Summer Olympics.

She holds a Master of Science in Economics and Business Administration from the Copenhagen Business School and now resides in New Zealand.
