= Francesco Ivaldi =

Italian yacht racer

Francesco Ivaldi (born 27 September 1977) is an Italian yacht racer who competed in the 2000 Summer Olympics.
