= Luc Pillot =

French sailor (born 1959)

Medal record

Sailing

Representing France

Olympic Games
| Gold medal – first place | 1988 Seoul | 470 class |
| Bronze medal – third place | 1984 Los Angeles | 470 class |

Luc Pillot (born 10 July 1959) is a French sailor and Olympic champion.

He won a gold medal in the 470 class at the 1988 Summer Olympics in Seoul, together with Thierry Peponnet. They received bronze medals in 1984.

Pillot won the yachting race Tour de France à la voile in 1998. He was the skipper of Le Défi at the 2003 Louis Vuitton Cup.
