= Jean-Claude Vuithier Sr. =

Swiss sailor

Personal information
- Nationality: Swiss
- Born: 19 January 1951 (age 74)

Sport
- Sport: Sailing

Jean-Claude Vuithier Sr. (born 19 January 1951) is a Swiss sailor. He competed at the 1976 Summer Olympics and the 1980 Summer Olympics.
