= Maksim Sheremetyev =

Russian sailor

Personal information
- Full name: Maksim Sergeyevich Sheremetyev
- Nationality: Russia
- Born: 22 December 1986 (age 39) Saint Petersburg, Russian SFSR
- Height: 1.78 m (5 ft 10 in)
- Weight: 72 kg (159 lb)

Sailing career
- Sport: Sailing
- Club: CSKA Moscow
- Coached by: Sergey Modestovich Egorov
- Class: Dinghy

Maksim Sergeyevich Sheremetyev (Russian: Максим Серге́евич Шереметьев; born 22 December 1986 in Saint Petersburg) is a Russian sailor, who specialized in two-person dinghy (470). He represented Russia, along with his older brother Mikhail Sheremetyev, in two editions of the Olympic Games (2008 and 2012), and has also been training for CSKA Moscow (Russian Army Sports Club) throughout most of his sporting career under personal coach Sergey Modestovich Egorov.

Sheremetyev and his brother Mikhail made their official debut at the 2008 Summer Olympics in Beijing, where they finished twentieth in the men's 470 class with a net score of 157, edging out Belarusian duo Siarhei Dziasiukevich and Pavel Lahunou by a narrow, two-point gap from the final standings.

At the 2012 Summer Olympics in London, Sheremetyev competed for the second time as a crew member in the men's 470 class by finishing fifteenth and receiving a berth from the World Championships in Barcelona, Spain. Teaming again with his brother and skipper Mikhail in the opening series, the Russian duo mounted two top 10 finishes on the fifth and seventh leg respectively to produce a remarkable grade of 130, but came up short for the medal race with a seventeenth-place finish in a fleet of twenty-seven boats.
