= Vesna Dekleva =

Slovenian sailor (born 1975)

Medal record

Sailing

Representing Slovenia

World Championships
Silver medal – second place	2004 Zadar	470

European Championships
Silver medal – second place	2003 Brest	470
Bronze medal – third place	2008 Riva del Garda	470

Vesna Dekleva Paoli (born 6 April 1975) is a Slovenian sailor. She competed at three Olympics: in 1996, 2004, and 2008. Her best result was at the 2004 Summer Olympics where she finished fourth.
