= Johan von Koskull =

Finnish sailor (1964–2021)

Personal information
- Nationality: Finnish
- Born: 25 September 1964; Helsinki, Finland
- Died: 29 May 2021 (aged 56)

Sport
- Sport: Sailing

Johan von Koskull (25 September 1964 – 29 May 2021) was a Finnish sailor. He competed at the 1984 Summer Olympics and the 1988 Summer Olympics.
