= Yevgeny Burmatnov =

Russian sailor

Personal information
- Nationality: Russian
- Born: 19 April 1966 (age 58)

Sport
- Sport: Sailing

Yevgeny Burmatnov (born 19 April 1966) is a Russian sailor. He competed at the 1992 Summer Olympics and the 1996 Summer Olympics.
