= Bettina Lemström =

Finnish sailor

Personal information
- Nationality: Finnish
- Born: 29 March 1966 (age 58); Helsinki, Finland

Sport
- Sport: Sailing

Bettina Lemström (born 29 March 1966) is a Finnish sailor. She competed in the women's 470 event at the 1988 Summer Olympics.
