= Felix Krabbe =

German yacht racer (born 1978)

Felix Krabbe (born 5 January 1978) is a German former yacht racer who competed in the 2004 Summer Olympics.
