= Roberto Molina (sailor) =

Spanish sailor

Personal information
- Full name: Roberto Molina Carrasco
- Born: 5 June 1960 (age 66) Arrecife, Las Palmas, Spain
- Height: 176 cm (5 ft 9 in)
- Weight: 70 kg (154 lb)

Sailing career
- Sport: Sailing
Medal record
Men's sailing
Representing Spain
Olympic Games
Gold medal – first place	1984 Los Angeles	470

Roberto Molina Carrasco (Note: In this Spanish name, the first or paternal surname is Molina and the second or maternal family name is Carrasco.) (born 5 June 1960) is a Spanish sailor and Olympic champion. He won gold medal in the 470 class at the 1984 Summer Olympics in Los Angeles, together with Luis Doreste.
