= Matteo Ivaldi =

Italian yacht racer

Matteo Ivaldi (born 17 April 1971) is an Italian yacht racer who competed in the 1996 Summer Olympics and in the 2000 Summer Olympics.
