= Kristian Heinilä =

Finnish sailor

Personal information
- Nationality: Finnish
- Born: 24 February 1976 (age 49); Helsinki, Finland

Sport
- Sport: Sailing

Kristian Heinilä (born 24 February 1976) is a Finnish sailor. He competed in the men's 470 event at the 2000 Summer Olympics.
