= Jonathan Glanfield =

British sailor

Olympic medal record

Representing Great Britain

Men's Sailing
Silver medal – second place	2004 Athens	Men's 470 class
Silver medal – second place	2008 Beijing	Men's 470 class

Jonathan "Joe" James Glanfield (born 6 August 1979, London Borough of Sutton) is a sailing competitor from Great Britain. He won a silver medal at both the 2004 Athens and 2008 Beijing Olympics with Nick Rogers in the 470 class. He also came 4th in the 2000 Olympics.
