= Begoña Vía Dufresne =

Spanish sailor

Personal information
- Full name: Begoña Vía Dufresne Pereña
- Born: 13 February 1971 (age 55) Barcelona, Spain
- Height: 179 cm (5 ft 10 in)
- Weight: 67 kg (148 lb)

Sailing career
- Sport: Sailing
- Class: 470
Medal record
Sailing
Representing Spain
Olympic Games
Gold medal – first place	1996 Atlanta	Women's 470

Begoña Vía Dufresne Pereña (Note: In this Spanish name, the first or paternal surname is Vía Dufresne and the second or maternal family name is Pereña.) (born 13 February 1971) is a Spanish sailor and Olympic champion. She competed at the 1996 Summer Olympics in Atlanta, where she won gold medal in the 470 class, together with Theresa Zabell.

Her sister is Natalia Vía Dufresne.
