= Andrea Trani =

Italian yacht racer

Andrea Trani (born 23 July 1977) is an Italian yacht racer who competed in the 2004 Summer Olympics and in the 2008 Summer Olympics.
