= Annika Lemström =

Finnish sailor

Personal information
- Nationality: Finnish
- Born: 10 July 1964 (age 60); Helsinki, Finland

Sport
- Sport: Sailing

Annika Lemström (born 10 July 1964) is a Finnish sailor. She competed in the women's 470 event at the 1988 Summer Olympics.
