= Miguel Nunes =

Portuguese sailor (born 1976)

Miguel Nunes (born 11 August 1976) is a Portuguese sailor. Together with Álvaro Marinho he competed in the 470 at four Olympics from 2000 to 2012. His best result was at the 2000 Summer Olympics where he finished fifth.
