= Harro Bode =

German sailor (born 1951)

Personal information
- Born: 20 February 1951 (age 75) Sobernheim
- Height: 180 cm (5 ft 11 in)
- Weight: 77 kg (170 lb)

Sailing career
- Sport: Sailing
- Club: Segel-Club Sorpesee Iserlohn
Medal record
Sailing
Representing West Germany
Olympic Games
Gold medal – first place	1976 Montreal	470 class

Harro Bode (born 20 February 1951, in Sobernheim) is a German sailor and Olympic champion. He won a gold medal in the 470 Class with Frank Hübner at the 1976 Summer Olympics in Montreal.

Bode studied civil engineering and later became CEO of Ruhrverband, a large water utility in the west of Germany. He was appointed honorary professor at the University of Hanover and published many papers about water science and water politics.

== Honours ==
- 1976: Award of silver laurel leaf by German Bundespräsident Walter Scheel
- 1987: Karl-Imhoff-Prize of the German Association for Water, Wastewater and Waste (DWA) (formerly ATV)
- 2014: IWA-Award for "Outstanding Contribution to Water Management and Science"
- 2015: Golden Badge of Honor of the German Association for Water, Wastewater and Waste (DWA)
