= Kiko Sánchez =

Spanish sailor

Medal record

Representing Spain

Sailing

Olympic Games
Gold medal – first place	1992 Barcelona	470 class

Francisco Sánchez Luna, known as Kiko Sánchez (born 19 September 1965) is a Spanish sailor and Olympic champion. He won a gold medal in the 470 class at the 1992 Summer Olympics in Barcelona, together with Jordi Calafat.
