= Álvaro Marinho =

Portuguese sailor

Álvaro Marinho (born 15 March 1976) (50 years old) is a Portuguese sailor. Together with Miguel Nunes he competed in the 470 at four Olympics from 2000 to 2012. His best result was at the 2000 Summer Olympics where he finished fifth. He also coached Gustavo Lima in the 2016 Rio Summer Olympic Games.

In September of 2023, he claimed the European title in the class Swan 36, alongside his team Farstar. 3 weeks after becoming European champion, Álvaro became Vice-World champion with the same team, in Scarlino, Italy.
