= Klara Maučec =

Slovenian sailor

Medal record

Sailing

Representing Slovenia

World Championships
Silver medal – second place	2004 Zadar	470

Klara Maučec (born 12 December 1977) is a Slovenian sailor. She competed at three Olympics in 2000, 2004 and 2008. Her best result was at the 2004 Summer Olympics where she finished fourth.
