= Camille Lecointre =

French sailor

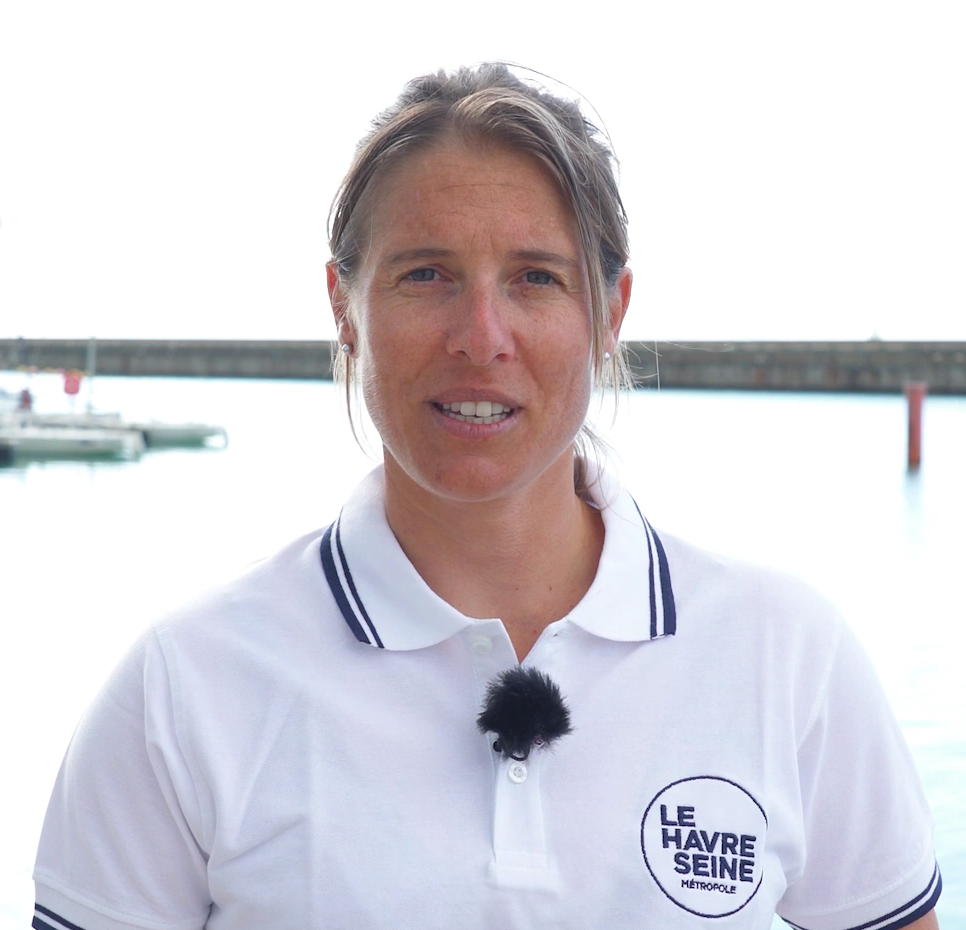
- Lecointre in 2022

Personal information
- Full name: Camille Lecointre Kliger
- Born: Camille Lecointre; 25 February 1985 (age 41) Harfleur, France

Sailing career
- Sport: Sailing
Medal record
Sailing
Representing France
Olympic Games
Bronze medal – third place	2016 Rio de Janeiro	Women's 470
Bronze medal – third place	2020 Tokyo	Women's 470
Mediterranean Games
Silver medal – second place	2005 Almería	Women's 470
Gold medal – first place	2013 Mersin	Women's 470

Camille Lecointre (born 25 February 1985 in Harfleur) is a French sailor.

== Career ==
Lecointre competed in the women's 470 class at the 2012 Summer Olympics. She finished fourth with Mathilde Géron in that event. She was a bronze medalist in the 470 class at the 2015 World Championships and won the world title in 2016 with Hélène Defrance. Lecointre and Defrance were selected to compete in the 2016 Summer Olympics and won the bronze medal in the women's 470 class.

Lecointre and Aloïse Retornaz won the 470 European Championships in 2019 and 2021. They also won the silver medal in the 470 category at the 2019 Military World Games in Wuhan, and won the final of the Sailing World Cup in Marseille. Lecointre and Retornaz were awarded the 2019 Sailor of the Year award by the French Sailing Federation. Lecointre and Retornaz won the bronze medal at the 2020 Summer Olympics in the women's 470 event.

== Personal life ==
Lecointre is married to Israeli skipper Gideon Kliger with whom she has a son born in 2017 and a daughter born in 2022.
