= Giovanna Micol =

Italian sailor

Giovanna Micol (born 18 April 1982 in Trieste) is an Italian sports sailor. At the 2008 and 2012 Summer Olympics, she competed in the Women's 470 class, crewing for helmsman Giulia Conti on both occasions.
