= Jordi Calafat =

Spanish sailor

Medal record

Representing Spain

Sailing

Olympic Games
Gold medal – first place	1992 Barcelona	470 class

Jordi Calafat (born 27 June 1968) is a Spanish sailor and Olympic champion. He won the Optimist World Championship in 1983. He also won a gold medal in the 470 Class at the 1992 Summer Olympics in Barcelona, together with Kiko Sánchez.

He joined Alinghi and helped them prepare for the 2007 America's Cup.
