= Nick Rogers (sailor) =

British sailor

Medal record

Representing Great Britain

Sailing

Olympic Games
Silver medal – second place	2004 Athens	Men's 470
Silver medal – second place	2008 Beijing	Men's 470

World Championships
Silver medal – second place	2001 Koper	Men's 470
Silver medal – second place	2005 San Francisco	Men's 470
Bronze medal – third place	2004 Zadar	Men's 470

Nicholas Robert Rogers (born 4 October 1977, in Lymington) is a sailing competitor from Great Britain. He won silver medals at the 2004 Athens and 2008 Beijing Olympics with Joe Glanfield in the 470 (dinghy) class. The pair began sailing together in 1997. He is the uncle of world champion sailor Vita Heathcote.
