= Stefanie Rothweiler =

German yacht racer

Stefanie Rothweiler (born 28 July 1979, in Immenstaad) is a German former yacht racer.

She competed in the 2004 Summer Olympics and in the 2008 Summer Olympics ranking in 15th and 9th respectively in the two person Dinghy event.

In 2007, she won the title for the Women's European Championship.
