= Sofian Bouvet =

French competitive sailor (born 1989)

Personal information
- Nationality: French
- Born: 2 June 1989 (age 37) Nice, Alpes-Maritimes, France
- Height: 173 cm (5 ft 8 in)
- Weight: 63 kg (139 lb)

Sport
- Sport: Sailing

Sofian Bouvet (born 2 June 1989) is a French competitive sailor.

He competed at the 2016 Summer Olympics in Rio de Janeiro, in the men's 470.
