= Sylvia Vogl =

Austrian yacht racer

Sylvia Vogl (born 15 December 1974) is an Austrian yacht racer who competed in the 2008 Summer Olympics.
