= Nicolas Charbonnier =

French sailor (born 1981)

Personal information
- Born: 4 August 1981 (age 45)
- Height: 173 cm (5 ft 8 in)

Sailing career
- Sport: Sailing
Medal record
Sailing
Representing France
Olympic Games
Bronze medal – third place	2008 Beijing	Men's 470
World Championships in Sailing
Youth Sailing World Championships
Gold medal – first place	1997 Kuopio	420 – Youth
Gold medal – first place	1999 Fukuoka	420 – Youth
420 World Championships
Gold medal – first place	1998 Palamós	420
Gold medal – first place	1999 Athens
470 World Championships
Silver medal – second place	2010 The Hague	470
470 Junior World Championships
Bronze medal – third place	2002 Nieuwpoort	470 Junior

Nicolas Charbonnier (born 4 August 1981) is a French sailor who won a bronze medal at the 2008 Summer Olympics in Beijing, China. He is 4 time World Champion, 3 time European Champion and "alinghi" team's tactician (Décision 35 and GC 32 Racing).
