= Carolina Flatscher =

Austrian yacht racer (born 1982)

Carolina Flatscher (born 18 May 1982) is an Austrian yacht racer who competed in the 2008 Summer Olympics.
