= Jérémie Mion =

French competitive sailor

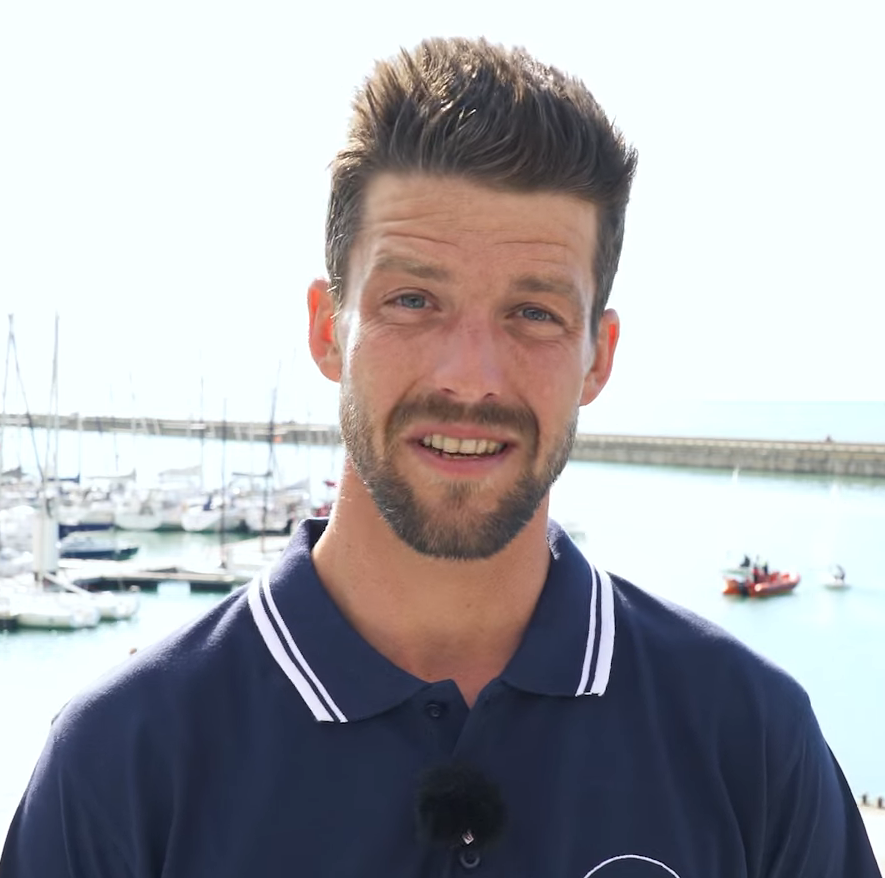
- 2022

Personal information
- Born: 5 July 1989 (age 37) Paris, France
- Height: 1.87 m (6 ft 2 in)
- Weight: 76 kg (168 lb)

Sport
- Country: France
- Sport: Sailing
- Club: Société des Régates du Havre

Achievements and titles
- Olympic finals: 2016

Jérémie Mion (born 5 July 1989) is a French competitive sailor.

He competed at the 2016 Summer Olympics in Rio de Janeiro, in the men's 470 reaching a 7th position.
