= 470 (dinghy) =

Olympic sailing class

Development
- Designer: André Cornu
- Year: 1963

Boat
- Crew: 2 (single trapeze)
- Draft: 150 mm (5.9 in); 970 mm (3 ft 2 in)

Hull
- Hull weight: 120 kg (260 lb)
- LOA: 4,700 mm (15 ft 5 in)
- LWL: 4,400 mm (14 ft 5 in)
- Beam: 1,690 mm (5 ft 7 in)

Sails
- Mainsail area: 9.12 m^{2} (98.2 sq ft)
- Jib/genoa area: 3.58 m^{2} (38.5 sq ft)
- Spinnaker area: 13 m^{2} (140 sq ft)

Racing
- D-PN: 86.3
- RYA PN: 973

The 470 (Four-Seventy) is a double-handed monohull planing dinghy with a centreboard, Bermuda rig, and centre sheeting. Equipped with a spinnaker, trapeze and a large sail-area-to-weight ratio, it is designed to plane easily, and good teamwork is necessary to sail it well. The name comes from the boat's length of 470 centimetres (4.7 m; 15 ft 5 in).

The 470 is a World Sailing International Class and has been an Olympic class since the 1976 games.

== History ==
The 470 was designed by the Frenchman André Cornu in 1963 (four years after the 420, its smaller sister) as a modern fibreglass planing dinghy to appeal to sailors of different sizes and ages. This formula succeeded, and the boat spread around the world. In 1969, the class was given international status and it has been an Olympic class since 1976. In 1988, the first Olympic women's sailing event used the 470.

== Sailing ==
To sail the 470, good physical fitness but not too much physical strength is required. The optimal weight of the combined crew ranges between 110 and 145 kg, making it a suitable boat for men, women and youth teams. Due to various options for sail trimming one can sail the boat well at 1 to 6 Beaufort scale, slightly above by experienced teams. For racing the 470 is a tactically demanding class, since differences in boat speed are small and the boat does not lose much speed during manoeuvers. Good teamwork between helm and crew is essential for successful racing.

== Races ==
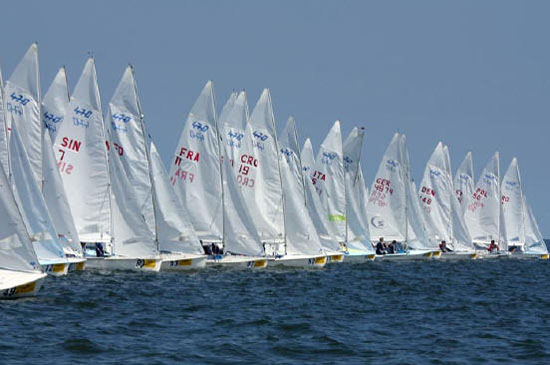

World and Continental Championships are organised every year with separate starts for women and men/mixed teams. There is also a World Championship for juniors and a Master World Championship. The 470 is used in regional championships such as the Asian, Mediterranean, and PanAm Games. Entries are limited in important international races, encouraging more competition by requiring qualifying races in most countries.

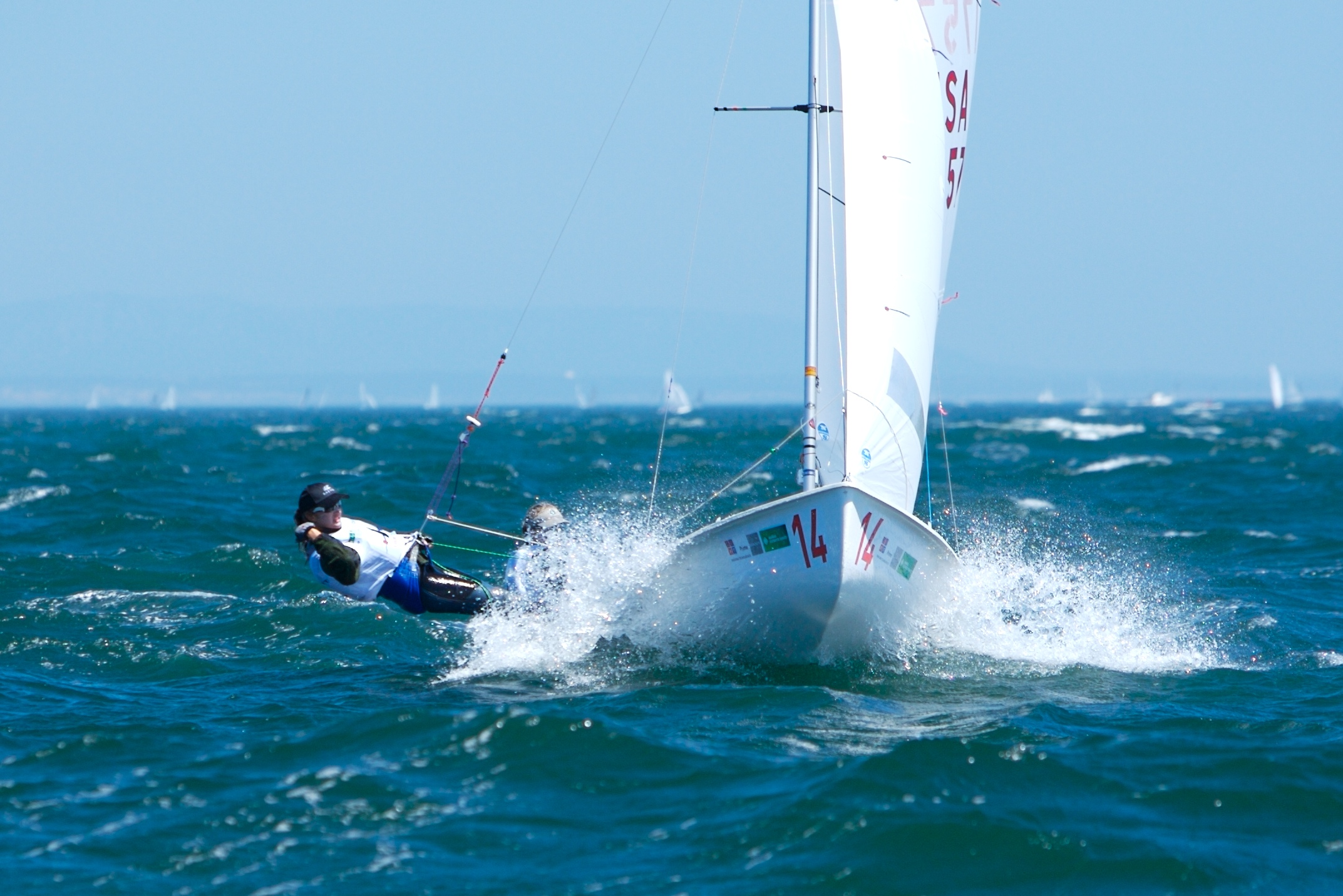
2008 470 World Champions Erin Maxwell and Isabelle Kinsolving sailing upwind.

In the World Championships more than 30 countries have been represented. There are 65 member nations in the International Class Association and more than 40,000 boats have been built in 20 countries.

The 470 may be raced in a mixed fleet of boats, its performance being adjusted by the Portsmouth Yardstick handicapping scheme. In the RYA-administered scheme, the 470 has a Portsmouth number of 973. In the US Sailing-administered scheme, it has a D-PN of 86.3.

== Construction ==
The 470 is a strict one-design class, and its builder must be approved a Licensed Builder by World Sailing. The class design may evolve, but its intent is to use proven, economical, and environmentally sound materials, currently fibreglass with integral buoyancy tanks for the hull.

The 470 dinghy is 4.70 m (15 ft 5 in) long with a 6.76 m (22 ft 2 in) mast. Its weight without sails is 120 kg (264 lb 9 oz).

== Events ==
=== Olympics ===
At the Olympic Games, the 470 Class was initially has been used at every games since 1976 games with various gender requirement. In the 2028 Olympic Games, it will be sailed during the mandatory mixed-gender event.

=== Open Gender ===
Games	Gold	Silver	Bronze
1976 Montreal	West Germany; Frank Hübner; Harro Bode	Spain; Antonio Gorostegui; Pedro Millet	Australia; Ian Brown; Ian Ruff
1980 Moscow	Brazil; Marcos Soares; Eduardo Penido	East Germany; Jorn Borowski; Egbert Swensson	Finland; Jouko Lindgrén; Georg Tallberg
1984 Los Angeles	Spain; Luis Doreste; Roberto Molina	United States; Steve Benjamin; Chris Steinfeld	France; Thierry Peponnet; Luc Pillot

==== Male ====
Games	Gold	Silver	Bronze
1988 Seoul	France; Thierry Peponnet; Luc Pillot	Soviet Union; Tõnu Tõniste; Toomas Tõniste	United States; John Shadden; Charles McKee
1992 Barcelona	Spain; Jordi Calafat; Francisco Sanchez	United States; Morgan Reeser; Kevin Burnham	Estonia; Tõnu Tõniste; Toomas Tõniste
1996 Atlanta	Ukraine; Yevhen Braslavets; Ihor Matviyenko	Great Britain; John Merricks; Ian Walker	Portugal; Victor Rocha; Nuno Barreto
2000 Sydney	Australia; Tom King; Mark Turnbull	United States; Paul Foerster; Robert Merrick	Argentina; Javier Conte; Juan de la Fuente
2004 Athens	United States; Paul Foerster; Kevin Burnham	Great Britain; Nick Rogers; Joe Glanfield	Japan; Kazuto Seki; Kenjiro Todoroki
2008 Beijing	Australia; Nathan Wilmot; Malcolm Page	Great Britain; Nick Rogers; Joe Glanfield	France; Nicolas Charbonnier; Olivier Bausset
2012 London	Australia; Mathew Belcher; Malcolm Page	Great Britain; Luke Patience; Stuart Bithell	Argentina; Lucas Calabrese; Juan de la Fuente
2016 Rio de Janeiro	Croatia; Šime Fantela; Igor Marenić	Australia; Mathew Belcher; William Ryan	Greece; Panagiotis Mantis; Pavlos Kagialis
2020 Tokyo	Australia; Mathew Belcher; William Ryan	Sweden; Anton Dahlberg; Fredrik Bergström	Spain; Jordi Xammar; Nicolás Rodríguez

==== Female ====
Games	Gold	Silver	Bronze
1988 Seoul	United States; Allison Jolly; Lynne Jewell	Sweden; Marit Söderström; Birgitta Bengtsson	Soviet Union; Larisa Moskalenko; Iryna Chunykhovska
1992 Barcelona	Spain; Theresa Zabell; Patricia Guerra	New Zealand; Leslie Egnot; Jan Shearer	United States; Jennifer Isler; Pamela Healy
1996 Atlanta	Spain; Theresa Zabell; Begoña Vía Dufresne	Japan; Yumiko Shige; Alicia Kinoshita	Ukraine; Ruslana Taran; Olena Pakholchik
2000 Sydney	Australia; Jenny Armstrong; Belinda Stowell	United States; J. J. Isler; Sarah Glaser	Ukraine; Ruslana Taran; Olena Pakholchik
2004 Athens	Greece; Sofia Bekatorou; Emilia Tsoulfa	Spain; Sandra Azón; Natalia Vía Dufresne	Sweden; Therese Torgersson; Vendela Zachrisson
2008 Beijing	Australia; Elise Rechichi; Tessa Parkinson	Netherlands; Marcelien de Koning; Lobke Berkhout	Brazil; Fernanda Oliveira; Isabel Swan
2012 London	New Zealand; Jo Aleh; Polly Powrie	Great Britain; Hannah Mills; Saskia Clark	Netherlands; Lisa Westerhof; Lobke Berkhout
2016 Rio de Janeiro	Great Britain; Hannah Mills; Saskia Clark	New Zealand; Jo Aleh; Polly Powrie	France; Camille Lecointre; Hélène Defrance
2020 Tokyo	Great Britain; Hannah Mills; Eilidh McIntyre	Poland; Agnieszka Skrzypulec; Jolanta Ogar	France; Camille Lecointre; Aloïse Retornaz

==== Mixed ====
Games	Gold	Silver	Bronze
2024 Paris	Austria; Lara Vadlau; Lukas Mähr	Japan; Keiju Okada; Miho Yoshioka	Sweden; Anton Dahlberg; Lovisa Karlsson
2028 Los Angeles			

== See also ==
- ISAF Sailing World Championships
- World Sailing
- 420 (dinghy)
- 420 World Championships
