= Kiel Week =

Annual sailing event in Kiel, Germany

- First held: 1882
- Organizer: Kieler Yacht-Club; Norddeutscher Regatta Verein; Hamburger Segel-Club; Verein Seglerhaus am Wannsee
- Classes: 420, 470, 2.4 mR, 29er, 49er, 49er FX, Contender, Europe, Flying Dutchman, ILCA 4, ILCA 6, ILCA 7, Iqfoil, J/24, J/70, Musto Skiff, Nacra 17, Nordic Folkboat, OK, Waszp
- Website: www.kieler-woche.de/en/index.php

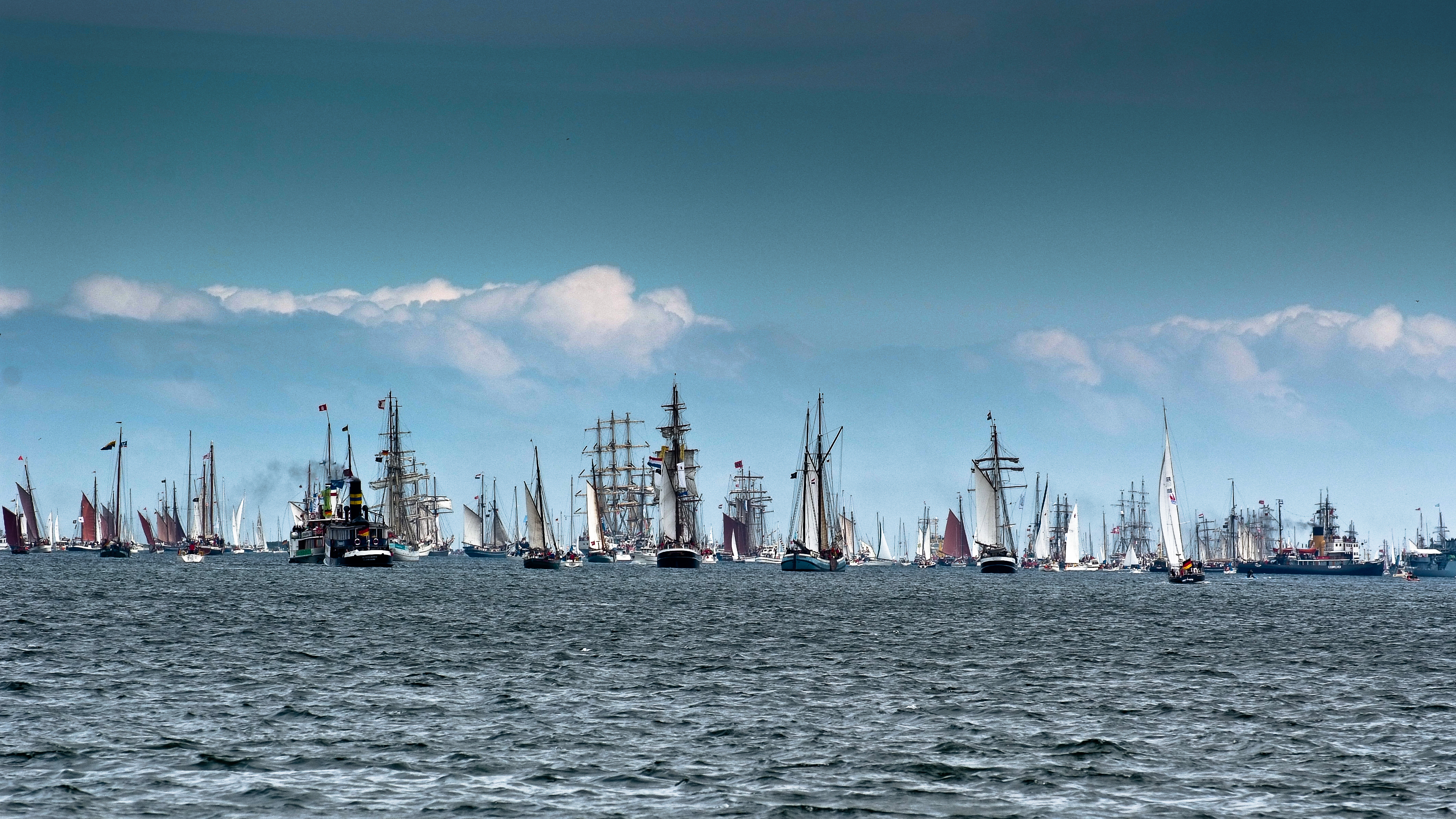
Tall Ships Parade at Kiel Week, the world's biggest regatta and sailing event (2009)

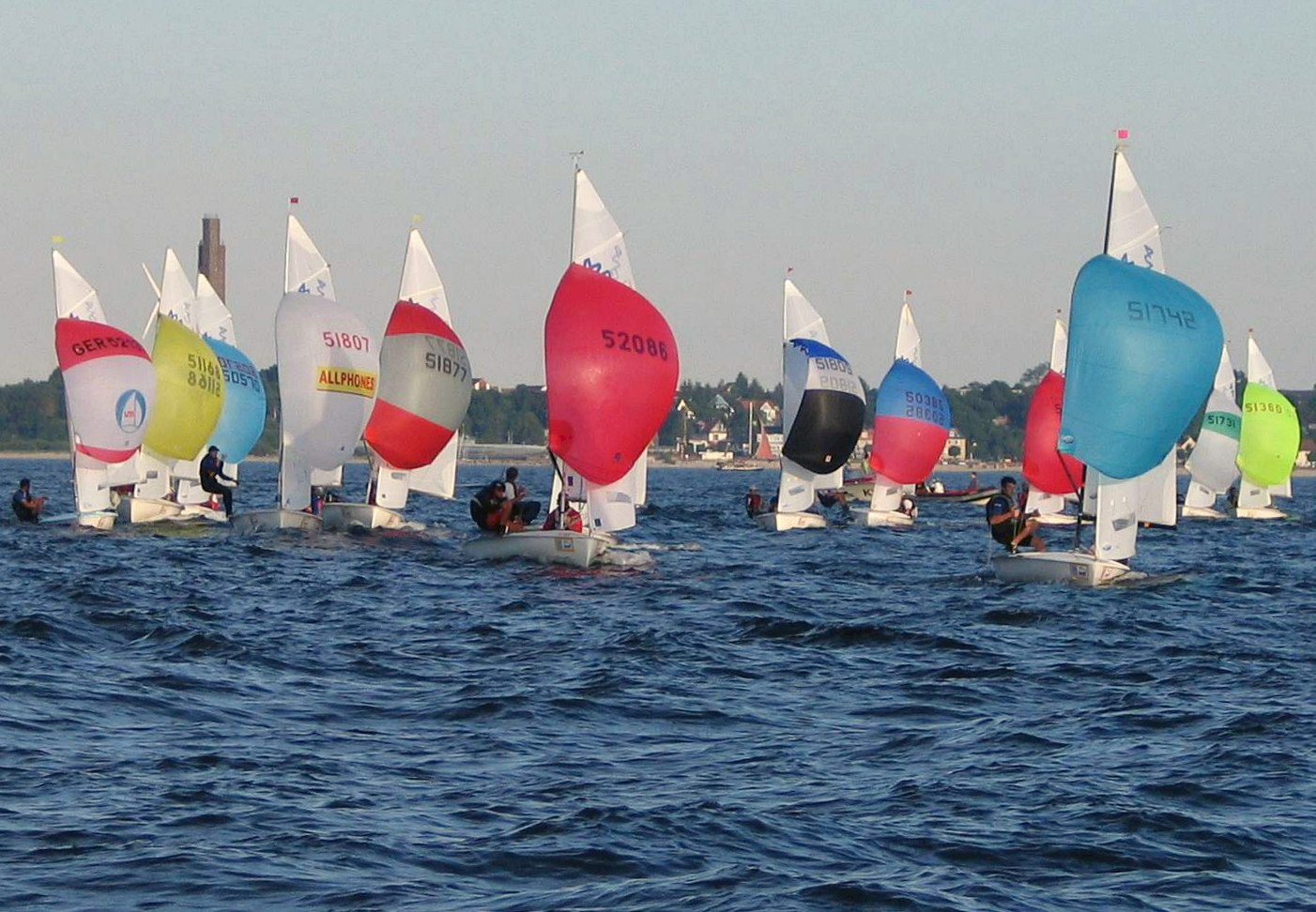
International 420 Class Dinghy regatta, 2005

Regatta of cruising yachts in front of Laboe, 2003

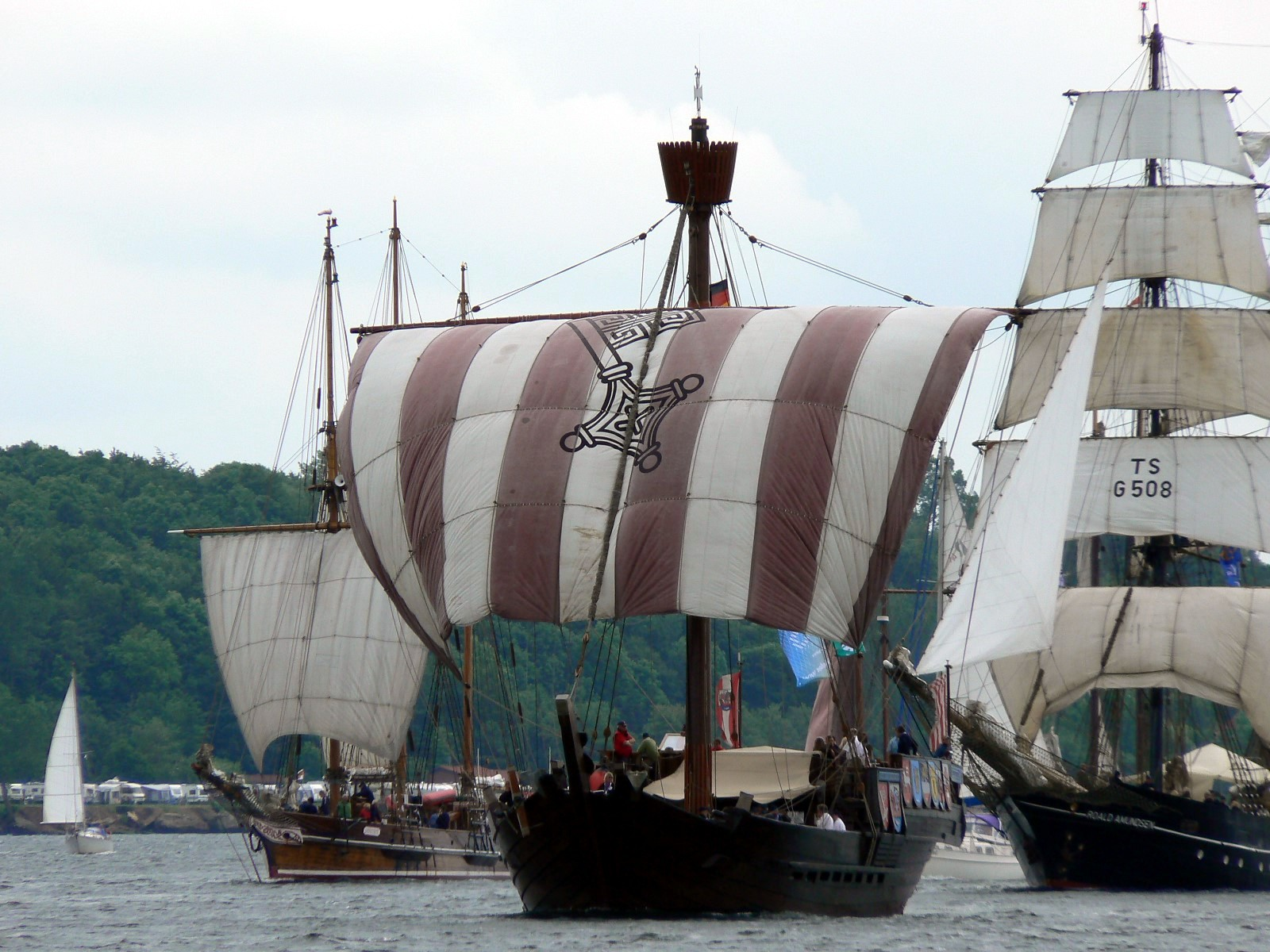
Amphitrite, Ubena von Bremen, and Roald Amundsen in 2007, forming part of the annual tall ship fleet at Kiel Week

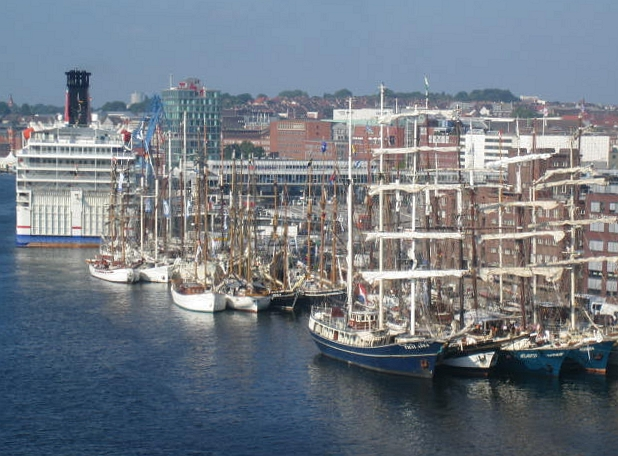
Tall ships attracting visitors in port during Kiel Week 2006

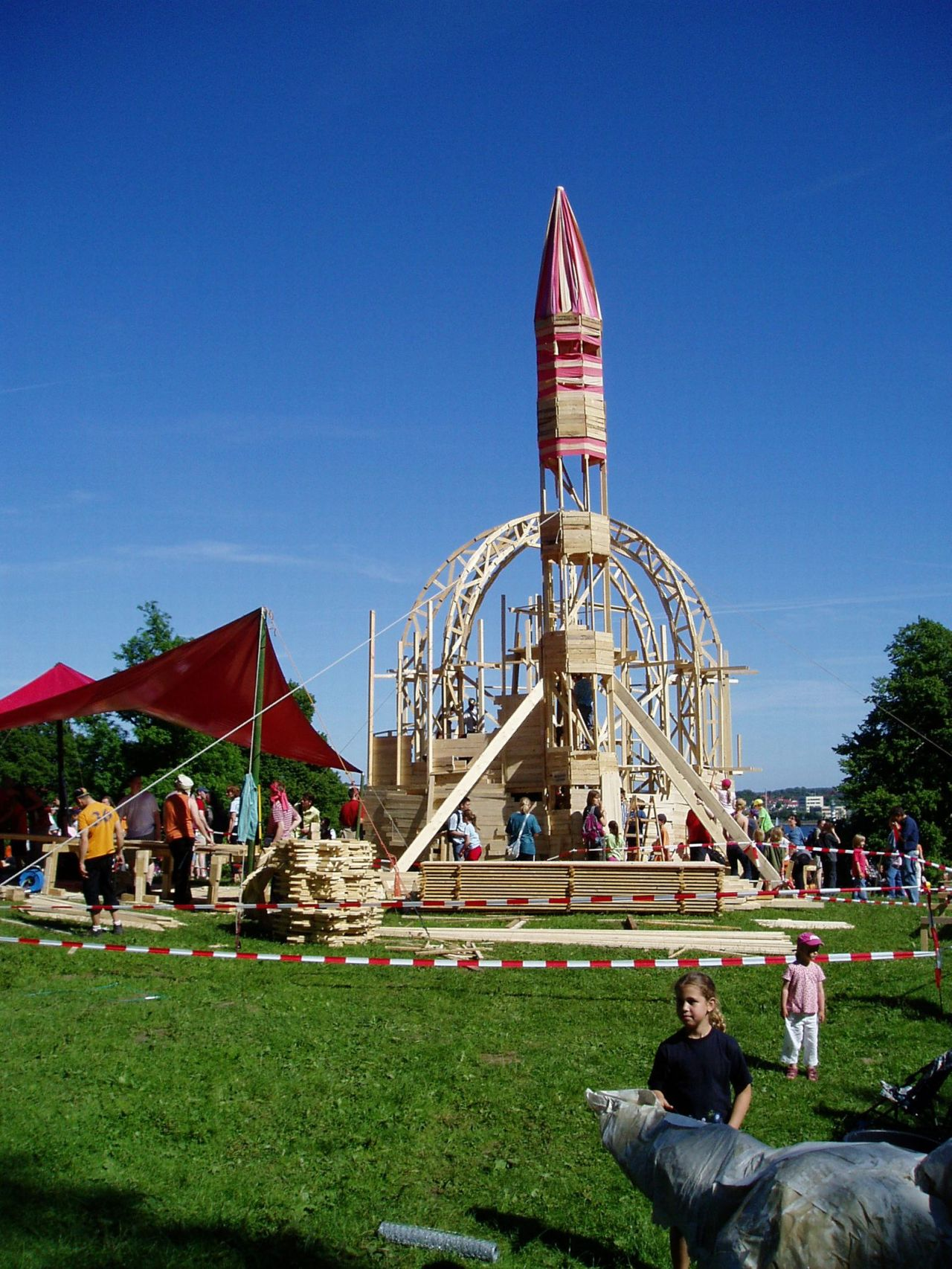
Fairs and events as part of festival at shore, 2005

The Kiel Week (German: Kieler Woche) or Kiel Regatta is an annual sailing event in Kiel, the capital of Schleswig-Holstein, Germany. It is considered to be one of the largest sailing events globally, and also the largest summer festivals in Northern Europe, attracting millions of people every year from all over Germany and neighbouring countries.

Together with the Trofeo Princesa Sofía, Semaine Olympique Française, and Allianz Regatta regattas, Kiel Week is part of the Sailing World Cup in the 2023 and 2024 seasons.

== Events ==
Kiel Week is held annually in the last week in June, and opens officially on the preceding Saturday with the official Glasen, followed by the Holstenbummel. The "Soundcheck" is on the Friday before the official opening; it is a music festival across all the stages within the city. Kiel Week, ends with a large fireworks display at 11 p.m. on Sunday, fired from pontoons or the quays at the Howaldtswerke, visible all across the Kiel Fjord. There are also many minigames.

Most ship races begin at the Olympic Harbor of Schilksee, also the centre of most sporting activities during Kiel Week. As Schilksee is located outside of the inner city and most sailing competitions take place yet further out, only some races – mainly of smaller boat types – can be viewed from shore, namely from along the Kiellinie at the west coast of the Kiel Fjord.

Kiel Week usually gathers around 5,000 sailors, 2,000 ships, and about three million visitors each year. The event is organized in a joint effort by the Yacht Club of Kiel, the Norddeutscher Regattaverein, the Hamburger Sailing Club, and the Verein Seglerhaus am Wannsee.

While Kiel Week started out as a ship racing championship, it has long since become a large festival with many popular bands playing on public stages. They often play for free, although the corporate sponsors (many from the Schleswig-Holstein media and telecommunications industry) usually display their involvement prominently. Most of the stages can be found at the Kiellinie (the western side of the Kieler Förde from the Düsternbrook yacht harbour past the Schleswig-Holstein parliament building to the big inner-city ferry harbour), and as of late, across the Hoernbridge to the Germania harbour and the Hörn. Another area of rich cultural activity in the city centre (Rathausplatz, Holstenbrücke) and the area connecting the city centre with the ferry harbour (Alter Markt, Dänische Straße, Schloßpark). Between the public stages and especially on the International Market on the Rathausplatz, food specialties from different countries can be eaten. Small street performances and street comedy are performed in many places. A special children's program is available at the Spiellinie.

Kiel Week is also one of the largest tall ship conventions in Germany, attracting many German and international traditional ships, mainly sailing ships. Many of them spend the week doing day tours out of Kiel, thus berthing much more in view of the festival visitors than the racing boats at Kiel-Schilksee. More than 100 traditional ships and hundreds of yachts usually participate in the Tall Ships Parade (Windjammerparade) on the day before the closing day of the Kiel Week, i.e. usually on the second Saturday of Kiel Week. The Parade was first held in 1972, under the name of Operation Sail, and was organized in celebration of the Olympic Summer Games in Germany that year, whose sailing competitions took place in Kiel. It was the first large gathering of tall ships since the time of the windjammers, and its success led to the annual Parade and to the foundation of the first sail training organization in Germany (Clipper DJS). Today, the Parade is often headed by the Gorch Fock, a sister ship to the German-built USCGC Eagle (WIX-327).

== Kiel Week Poster and Enamel Plaques ==
Since 1948, advertises an annual Kiel Week poster for the festival week. Their design is another example of the cultural positioning and visual-design tradition of the Kieler Woche. In this context represents a jury put together a selection of graphic designers and then invites them to a competition for the corporate design of the festival week. An invitation is already an honor, because the design contest enjoys a high reputation and many designs have been awarded national and international prizes.

Among other things, the following graphic artists designed for the Kiel Week: Ernst Irmler (1953), Anton Stankowski (1962), Hans Hillmann (1964), Michael Engelmann (1965), Bruno K. Wiese (1971 & 1982), Rolf Müller (, 1972), Otto Treumann (1975), Ruedi Baur (1986), Rosemarie Tissi (1990), Hans Günther Schmitz (1992), Christof Gassner (1993), Siegfried Odermatt (1994), Barbara & Gerd Baumann (1995), Wim Crouwel (1998 ), Fons M. Hickmann (2002), Klaus Hesse (2006), Markus Dressen (2007), Peter Zizka (2008), Henning Wagenbreth (2009), Andrew and Jeffrey Goldstein (2010), Melchior Imboden (2011) and Stefan Guzy and Björn re (2015).

The series of Kieler Woche playcards considered as a reflection of the recent graphic story. The motifs are applied to many objects and almost all of these – mostly developed by the competition winner himself – applications reach after a short time collector status.

Even before WWII annual enamel plaques were made as memento for the competitors.

A selection of the annual enamel plaques of the Kiel Week
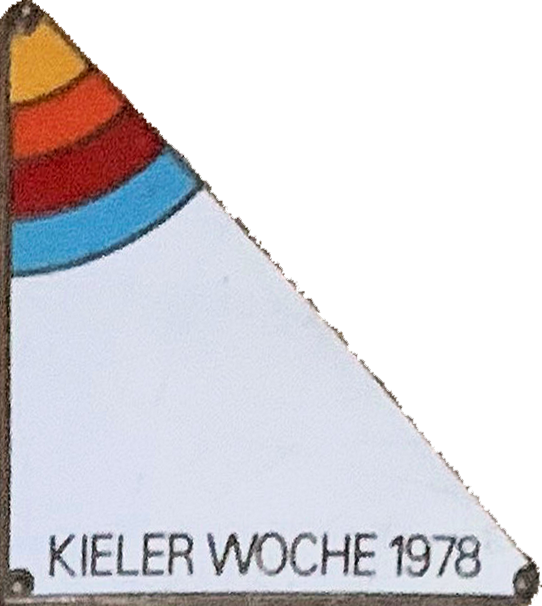
1978

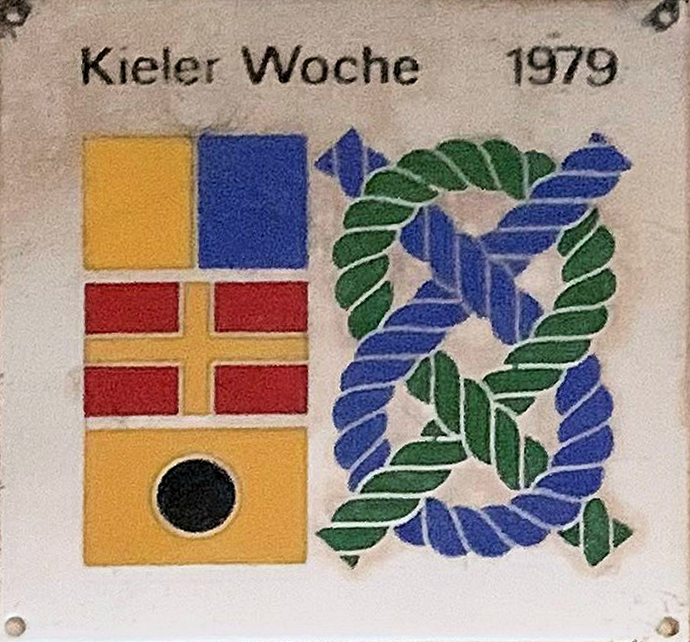
1979

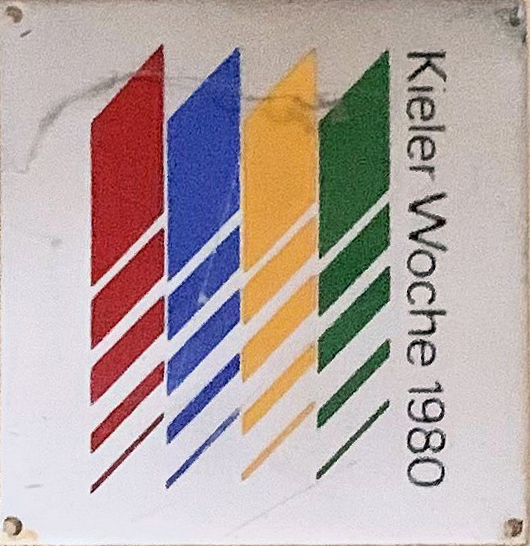
1980

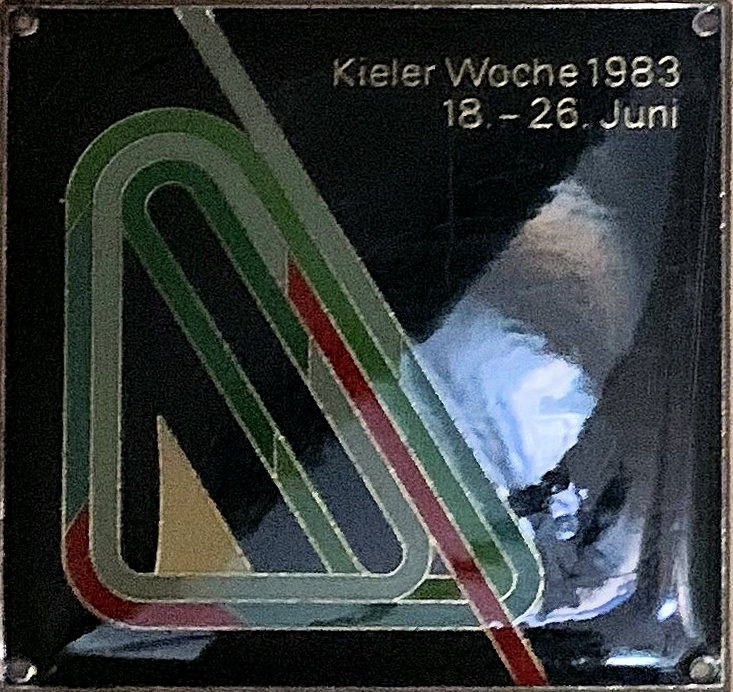
1983

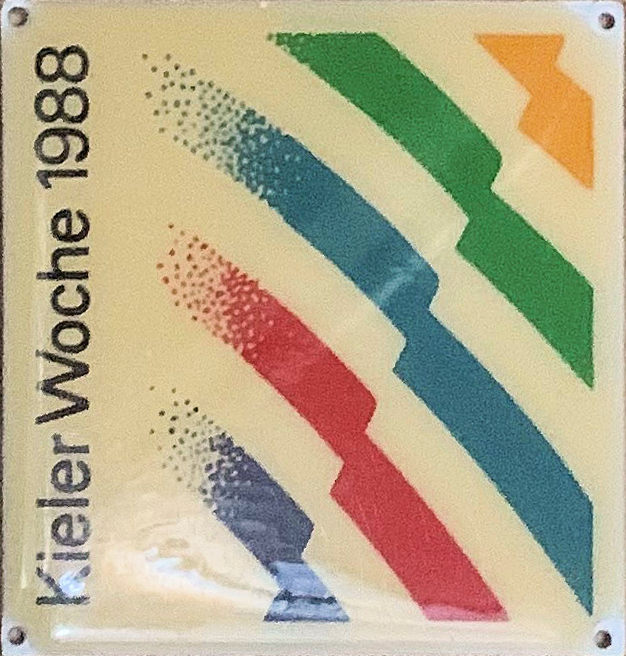
1988

== History ==
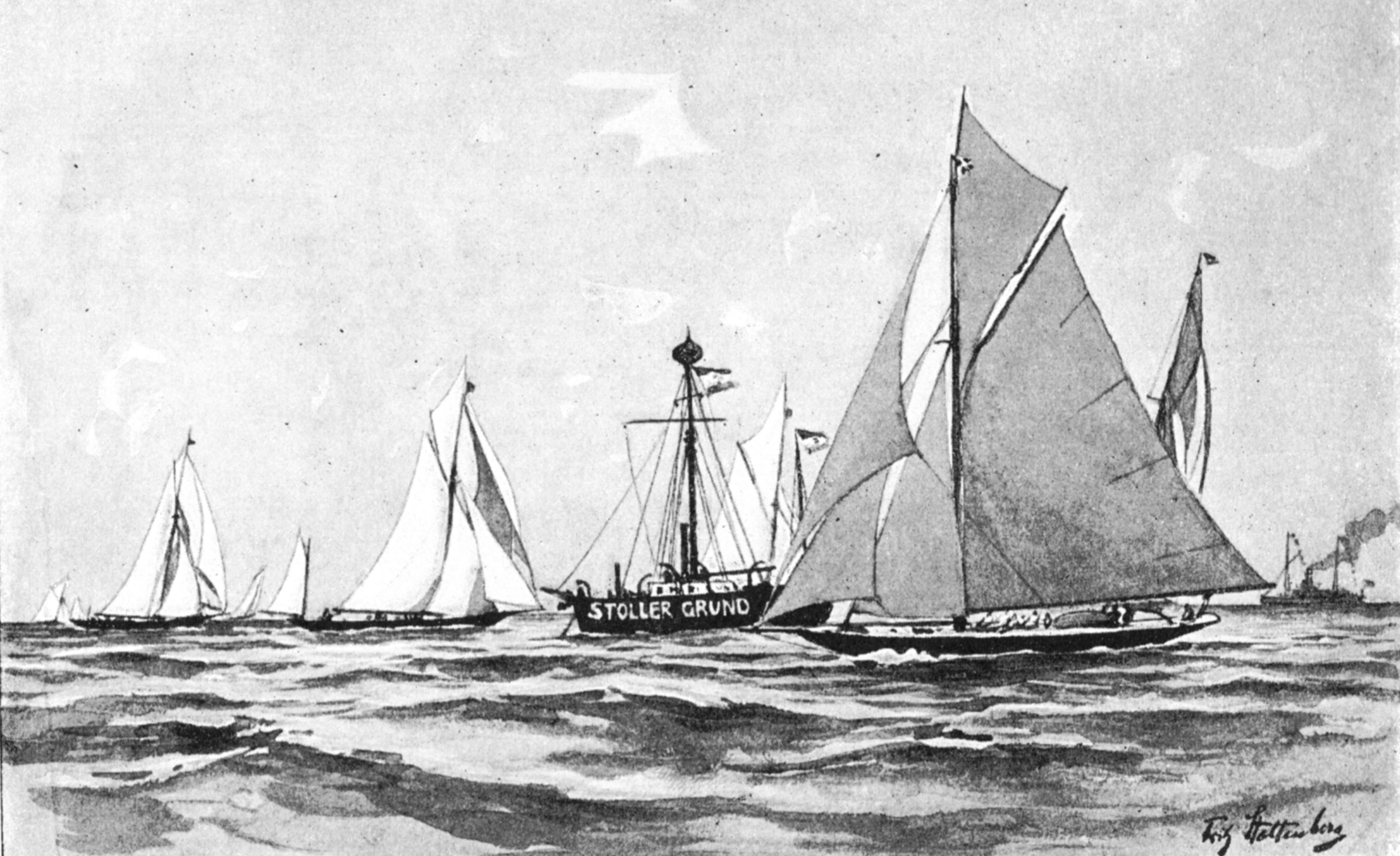
Kiel Week, probably in 1895 (Fritz Stoltenberg)

- June 23, 1882 20 sailing yachts (one of them Danish) participate in a ship race from Düsternbrook. Because of the large success the event is held annually in the following years.
- 1889 The German Emperor Wilhelm II visits the ship races for the first time.
- 1892 More than 100 ships announce themselves for the ship races.
- 1894 The event is called Kiel Week for the first time in press reports. Emperor Wilhelm II is a regular visitor now.
- 1895 Opening of the Kiel Canal, then called Kaiser-Wilhelm-Kanal during Kiel Week.
- 1907 25th anniversary of Kiel Week. Since then more than 6,000 ships have been racing at the event.
- 1914 New canal locks are opened during Kiel Week. On June 28, Archduke Franz Ferdinand of Austria is murdered in Sarajevo, leading to World War I and interrupting Kiel Week. Between 1915 and 1918 Kiel Week is not held.
- 1934 Kiel Week becomes an instrument of propaganda for the Nazis.
- 1936 For the first time, Kiel is the location for the sailing contests at the Summer Olympics.
- 1937 Kiel Week is organized by the newly formed Yacht-Club von Deutschland.
- 1940–1946 During World War II, Kiel Week does not happen.
- 1945 The first sailing week after the Second World War is held by the British occupation army under the name "Kiel-Week".
- 1947 A festival week in September is held under the name 'Kiel im Aufbau' ('Kiel in reconstruction').
- * End of June 1948 First Kiel Week after the war.
- September 1948 "Kiel im Aufbau" held for the second time.
- 1949 "Kiel im Aufbau" integrated into Kiel Week.
- 1950 Theodor Heuss is the first President of Germany to visit Kiel Week.
- 1962 Important Scandinavian theatre groups and orchestras set new accents for the cultural part of Kiel Week.
- 1972 For the second time the sailing contests at the Summer Olympics are held in Kiel, finishing with a Tall Ships Parade.
- 1974 The Spiellinie becomes a permanent institution at Kiel Week after the initial success of the Olympic Spielstraße for children in 1972. It is established along the Kiellinie.
- 1982 100 years of Kiel Week celebrations.
- 1994 100th Kiel Week celebrations (during the First and Second World Wars, Kiel Week was suspended); co-operation agreement with boot Düsseldorf.
- 1995 100 years of the Kiel Canal (formerly Kaiser-Wilhelm-Canal) celebrations.

== Winners ==
=== Contender ===
- 1995 – Jan von der Bank (GER)
- 1996 – Graham Scott (GBR)
- 1997 – Ian Renilson (GBR)
- 1998 – Andrea Bonezzi (ITA)
- 1999 – Claus Staffe (DEN)
- 2000 – Claus Staffe (DEN)
- 2001 – Gabriel Wicke (GER)
- 2002 – Andrea Bonezzi (ITA)
- 2003 – Jan von der Bank (GER)
- 2004 – Andrea Bonezzi (ITA)
- 2005 – Jan von der Bank (GER)
- 2006 – Andrea Bonezzi (ITA)
- 2007 – Jan von der Bank (GER)
- 2008 – Christoph Homeier (GER)
- 2009 – Jan von der Bank (GER)
- 2010 – Bjarke Johnsen (DEN)
- 2011 – Christoph Homeier (GER)
- 2012 – Søren Dulong Andreasen (DEN)
- 2013 – Mark Bulka (AUS)
- 2014 – Søren Dulong Andreasen (DEN)
- 2015 – Jesper Nielsen (DEN)
- 2016 – Søren Dulong Andreasen (DEN)
- 2017 – Jesper Nielsen (DEN)
- 2018 – Christoph Homeier (GER)
- 2019 – Søren Dulong Andreasen (DEN)
- 2020 – Søren Dulong Andreasen (DEN)
- 2021 – Søren Dulong Andreasen (DEN)
- 2022 – Søren Dulong Andreasen (DEN)

=== Men's Europe ===
- 1987 – Henrik Jacobsen (SWE)
- 1988 – Peer Moberg (NOR)
- 1989 – Valerio Chinca (ITA)
- 1990 – Kim Christensen (DEN)
- 1991 – Jan Christiansen (DEN)
- 1992 – Søren Johnsen (DEN)
- 1993 – Søren Johnsen (DEN)
- 1994 – Søren Johnsen (DEN)
- 1995 – Kai Redemann (GER)
- 1996 – Bernhard Krüger (GER)
- 1997 – Jacek Zbierski (POL)
- 1998 – Jacek Zbierski (POL)
- 1999 – Jacek Zbierski (POL)
- 2000 – Mats Wang-Hansen (NOR)
- 2001 – Tim Kirchhoff (GER)
- 2002 – Søren Johnsen (DEN)
- 2003 – Søren Johnsen (DEN)
- 2004 – Mikkel Bonde (DEN)

=== Women's Europe ===
- 1989 – Sabrina Landi (ITA)
- 1990 – Tine Moberg (CAN)
- 1991 – Tine Moberg (CAN)
- 1992 – Karin Andersson (SWE)
- 1993 – Karin Moberg (DEN)
- 1994 – Tine Moberg-Parker (CAN)
- 1995 – Carolina Toll (NOR)
- 1996 – Karianne Eikeland (NOR)
- 1997 – Kristine Roug (DEN)
- 1998 – Carolijn Brouwer (NED)
- 1999 – Kristine Roug (DEN)
- 2000 – Kristine Roug (DEN)
- 2001 – Christiane Petzke (GER)
- 2002 – Carolijn Brouwer (NED)
- 2003 – Petra Niemann (GER)
- 2004 – Tatiana Drozdovskaya (BLR)

=== Open Europe ===
- 2005 – Jacob Ege Friis (DEN)
- 2006 – Teemu Rantanen (FIN)
- 2007 – Christian Rindom (DEN)
- 2008 – Sönke Herrmann (GER)
- 2009 – Thomas Ribeaud (FRA)
- 2010 – Sylvain Notonier (FRA)
- 2011 – Sylvain Notonier (FRA)
- 2012 – Sylvain Notonier (FRA)
- 2013 – Lars Johan Brodtkorb (NOR)
- 2014 – Anna Munch (DEN)
- 2015 – Fabian Kirchhoff (GER)
- 2016 – Lars Johan Brodtkorb (NOR)
- 2017 – Anna Livbjerg (DEN)
- 2018 – Lars Johan Brodtkorb (NOR)
- 2019 – Anna Livbjerg (DEN)
- 2020 – Anna Livbjerg (DEN)
- 2021 – Sebastian Knaack (SWE)
- 2022 – Casper Fink (DEN)

=== Finn ===
- 1952 – Enelli
- 1956 – Paul Elvstrøm (DEN)
- 1957 – Paul Elvstrøm (DEN)
- 1958 – Børge Schwartz (DEN)
- 1959 – Wilhelm Kuhweide (FRG)
- 1960 – Paul Elvstrøm (DEN)
- 1961 – Bruce McCurrach (RSA)
- 1962 – Jean-Claude Jammes (FRA)
- 1963 – Uwe Mares (FRG)
- 1964 – Wilhelm Kuhweide (FRG)
- 1965 – Wilhelm Kuhweide (FRG)
- 1966 – Wilhelm Kuhweide (FRG)
- 1967 – Wilhelm Kuhweide (FRG)
- 1968 – Uwe Mares (FRG)
- 1969 – Andreas von Eicken (FRG)
- 1970 – Wilhelm Kuhweide (FRG)
- 1971 – Thomas Jungblut (FRG)
- 1972 – Thomas Lundquist (SWE)
- 1973 – Uwe Heinzmann
- 1974 – Serge Maury (FRA)
- 1975 – David Howlett (GBR)
- 1976 – Chris Law (GBR)
- 1977 – Ryszard Skarbiński (POL)
- 1978 – Joaquín Blanco Roca (ESP)
- 1979 – John Bertrand (USA)
- 1980 – Liljegren (SWE)
- 1981 – Lasse Hjortnæs (DEN)
- 1982 – Lasse Hjortnæs (DEN)
- 1983 – Lasse Hjortnæs (DEN)
- 1984 – Lasse Hjortnæs (DEN)
- 1985 – Brian Ledbetter (USA)
- 1986 – Lasse Hjortnæs (DEN)
- 1987 – Oleg Khopyorsky (URS)
- 1988 – Stig Westergaard (DEN)
- 1989 – Mats Caap (SWE)
- 1990 – Hans Spitzauer (AUT)
- 1991 – Anders Lundmark (SWE)
- 1992 – José van der Ploeg (ESP)
- 1993 – Fredrik Lööf (SWE)
- 1994 – Hans Spitzauer (AUT)
- 1995 – Xavier Rohart (FRA)
- 1996 – Michal Maier (CZE)
- 1997 – Hans Spitzauer (AUT)
- 1998 – Mateusz Kusznierewicz (POL)
- 1999 – Mateusz Kusznierewicz (POL)
- 2000 – Sébastien Godefroid (BEL)
- 2001 – Michael Fellmann (GER)
- 2002 – Mateusz Kusznierewicz (POL)
- 2003 – Sébastien Godefroid (BEL)
- 2004 – Rafael Trujillo (ESP)
- 2005 – Gašper Vinčec (SLO)
- 2006 – Dan Slater (NZL)
- 2007 – Gašper Vinčec (SLO)
- 2008 – Ed Wright (GBR)
- 2009 – Rafał Szukiel (POL)
- 2010 – Ivan Kljaković Gašpić (CRO)
- 2011 – Ed Wright (GBR)
- 2012 – Deniss Karpak (EST)
- 2013 – Mark Andrews (GBR)
- 2014 – Deniss Karpak (EST)
- 2015 – Deniss Karpak (EST)
- 2016 – Phillip Kasüske (GER)
- 2017 – Deniss Karpak (EST)
- 2018 – Josh Junior (NZL)
- 2019 – Phillip Kasüske (GER)
- 2020 – Nicholas Heiner (NED)

=== ILCA 4 (formerly known as Laser 4.7) ===
- 2013 – Eric Toralf Malach (GER)
- 2014 – Moritz Paschen (GER)
- 2015 – Julia Büsselberg (GER)
- 2016 – Maksim Dziahel (BLR)
- 2017 – Tobias Sandmo Birkeland (NOR)
- 2018 – Cesare Barabino (ITA)
- 2019 – Ole Schweckendiek (GER)
- 2020 – Batbold Gruner (GER)
- 2021 – Batbold Gruner (GER)
- 2022 – Gudleik Berg Kjøpsnes (NOR)

=== Men's ILCA 6 (formerly known as Laser Radial) ===
- 2018 – Zac Littlewood (AUS)

=== Women's ILCA 6 (formerly known as Laser Radial) ===
- 2005 – Gintarė Volungevičiūtė (LTU)
- 2006 – Petra Niemann (GER)
- 2007 – Jo Aleh (NZL)
- 2008 – Sophie de Turckheim (FRA)
- 2009 – Paige Railey (USA)
- 2010 – Paige Railey (USA)
- 2011 – Paige Railey (USA)
- 2012 – Tatiana Drozdovskaya (BLR)
- 2013 – Tuula Tenkanen (FIN)
- 2014 – Tatiana Drozdovskaya (BLR)
- 2015 – Erika Reineke (USA)
- 2016 – Tiril Bue (NOR)
- 2017 – Silvia Zennaro (ITA)
- 2018 – Anne-Marie Rindom (DEN)
- 2019 – Josefin Olsson (SWE)
- 2020 – Anne-Marie Rindom (DEN)
- 2021 – Agata Barwińska (POL)
- 2022 – Mara Stransky (AUS)

=== Open ILCA 6 (formerly known as Laser Radial) ===
- 2003 – Paige Railey (USA)
- 2004 – Simon Morgan (AUS)
- 2013 – Christian Guldberg Rost (DEN)
- 2014 – Viktorija Andrulytė (LTU)
- 2015 – Haddon Hughes (USA)
- 2016 – Aleksi Tapper (FIN)
- 2017 – Caroline Sofia Rosmo (NOR)
- 2018 – Tytus Butowski (POL)
- 2019 – Lee Wonn Kye (SGP)
- 2020 – Paul Hameeteman (NED)
- 2021 – Ole Schweckendiek (GER)
- 2022 – Ole Schweckendiek (GER)

=== ILCA 7 (formerly known as Laser) ===
- 1987 – Stefan Warkalla (FRG)
- 1988 – Stefan Warkalla (FRG)
- 1989 – Martin Fahr (FRG)
- 1990 – Glenn Bourke (AUS)
- 1991 – Michael Hestbæk (DEN)
- 1992 – Michael Hestbæk (DEN)
- 1993 – Klaus Lahme (GER)
- 1994 – John Harrysson (SWE)
- 1995 – Peer Moberg (NOR)
- 1996 – Jens Eckardt (DEN)
- 1997 – Karl Suneson (SWE)
- 1998 – Ben Ainslie (GBR)
- 1999 – Robert Scheidt (BRA)
- 2000 – Robert Scheidt (BRA)
- 2001 – Daniel Birgmark (SWE)
- 2002 – Daniel Birgmark (SWE)
- 2003 – Maciej Grabowski (POL)
- 2004 – Robert Scheidt (BRA)
- 2005 – Paul Goodison (GBR)
- 2006 – Paul Goodison (GBR)
- 2007 – Michael Blackburn (AUS)
- 2008 – Tom Slingsby (AUS)
- 2009 – Paul Goodison (GBR)
- 2010 – Tom Slingsby (AUS)
- 2011 – Simon Grotelüschen (GER)
- 2012 – Philipp Buhl (GER)
- 2013 – Philipp Buhl (GER)
- 2014 – Philipp Buhl (GER)
- 2015 – Tobias Schadewaldt (GER)
- 2016 – Philipp Buhl (GER)
- 2017 – Francesco Marrai (ITA)
- 2018 – Philipp Buhl (GER)
- 2019 – Jack Cookson (GBR)
- 2020 – Philipp Buhl (GER)
- 2022 – Kaarle Tapper (FIN)

=== Moth ===
- 2008 – Adam May (GBR)

=== Musto Skiff ===
- 2013 – Roger Oswald (SUI)
- 2014 – Frithjof Schwerdt (GER)
- 2015 – Ben Schooling (GBR)
- 2016 – Frithjof Schwerdt (GER)
- 2019 – Rick Peacock (GBR)
- 2020 – Iver Ahlmann (GER)
- 2022 – Rick Peacock (GBR)

=== OK ===
- 1987 – Dennis Josefsson (SWE)
- 1988 – Karsten Hitz (FRG)
- 1989 – Frank Schönfeldt (FRG)
- 1990 – Karsten Hitz (FRG)
- 1991 – Bo Staffan Andersson (SWE)
- 1992 – Anders Pers (SWE)
- 1993 – Karsten Hitz (GER)
- 1994 – Karsten Hitz (GER)
- 1995 – Karsten Hitz (GER)
- 1996 – Antoni Pawłowski (POL)
- 1997 – Karsten Hitz (GER)
- 1998 – Steen Christensen (DEN)
- 1999 – Karsten Hitz (GER)
- 2000 – Bart Bomans (BEL)
- 2001 – Nick Craig (GBR)
- 2002 – Karsten Hitz (GER)
- 2003 – Bart Bomans (BEL)
- 2004 – Bart Bomans (BEL)
- 2005 – Nick Craig (GBR)
- 2006 – Gunter Arndt (GER)
- 2007 – Oliver Gronholz (GER)
- 2008 – Thomas Hansson-Mild (SWE)
- 2009 – Greg Wilcox (NZL)
- 2010 – Greg Wilcox (NZL)
- 2011 – Greg Wilcox (NZL)
- 2012 – Thomas Hansson-Mild (SWE)
- 2013 – André Budzien (GER)
- 2014 – Bo Petersen (DEN)
- 2015 – Charlie Cumbley (GBR)
- 2016 – Thomas Hansson-Mild (SWE)
- 2017 – Jim Hunt (GBR)
- 2018 – Jan Kurfeld (GER)
- 2019 – Fredrik Lööf (SWE)
- 2020 – Mads Bendix (DEN)
- 2021 – Bo Petersen (DEN)
- 2022 – André Budzien (GER)

=== Waszp ===
- 2021 – Mathilde B. Robertstad (NOR)
- 2022 – Adrien-Paul Farien (GER)

=== 420 ===
- 1987 – Jens Olbrysch (FRG)
- 1988 – Stefanie Wagner (FRG)
- 1989 – Luc Angels (FRA)
- 1990 – Marcus Bauer (FRG)
- 1991 – Zeev Kalach (ISR)
- 1992 – Uta Kock (GER)
- 1993 – Schütt & Eberhardt (GER)
- 1994 – Robert Greenhalgh & Peter Greenhalgh (GBR)
- 1995 – Mikael Lindquist & Kalle Kjerstadius (SWE)
- 1996 – Etienne Huter & Pierre Huter (SUI)
- 1997 – Xavier Vandeghinste & Quentin Blondiau (BEL)
- 1998 – Nicolas Charbonnier & David Deguine (FRA)
- 1999 – Allan Nørregaard & Henrik Jørgensen (DEN)
- 2000 – Luca Bursic & Jacob Thomas (ITA)
- 2001 – Park Jong-woo & Lee Dong-woo (KOR)
- 2002 – Nic Asher & Elliot Willis (GBR)
- 2003 – José Antonio Medina & Onán Barreiros (ESP)
- 2004 – Nathan Outteridge & Iain Jensen (AUS)
- 2005 – Farokh Tarapore & Vikas Kapila (IND)
- 2006 – Susanne Baur & Katharina Berggren (GER)
- 2007 – Florian Dziesiaty & Oliver Szymanski (GER)
- 2008 – Federico Maccari & Rocco Vitali (ITA)
- 2009 – Philip Sparks & Ben Gratton (GBR)
- 2010 – Justin Liu & Sherman Cheng (SGP)
- 2011 – Angus Galloway & Alexander Gough (AUS)
- 2012 – Nadja Horwitz & Francisca Fuentes (CHI)
- 2013 – Jan Borbet & Kilian Northoff (GER)
- 2014 – Abu Maor & Yoav Rooz (ISR)
- 2015 – Wiley Rogers & Jack Parkin (USA)
- 2016 – Wiley Rogers & Jack Parkin (USA)
- 2017 – Telis Athanasopoulos Yogo & Dimitrios Tassios (GRE)
- 2018 – Felix Kaiser & Jonas Royla (GER)
- 2019 – Patryk Kosmalski & Tomasz Lewandowski (POL)
- 2020 – Patryk Kosmalski & Tomasz Lewandowski (POL)
- 2021 – Lilli Zellmer & Franziska Steinlein (GER)
- 2022 – Leonard von Holtum & Josh Berktold (GER)

=== Men's 470 ===
- 1987 – Wolfgang Hunger (FRG)
- 1988 – Wolfgang Hunger (FRG)
- 1989 – Ernst Meyer (FRG)
- 1990 – Tõnu Tõniste (EST)
- 1991 – Wolfgang Hunger (GER)
- 1992 – Herman Horn Johannessen (NOR)
- 1993 – Wolfgang Hunger & Schmidt (GER)
- 1994 – John Merricks & Ian Walker (GBR)
- 1995 – Yevhen Braslavets & Ihor Matviyenko (UKR)
- 1996 – Dmitry Berezkin & Yevgeny Burmatnov (RUS)
- 1997 – Yevhen Braslavets & Ihor Matviyenko (UKR)
- 1998 – Paul Foerster & Bob Merrick (USA)
- 1999 – Gildas Philippe & Tanguy Cariou (FRA)
- 2000 – Tom King & Mark Turnball (AUS)
- 2001 – Gabrio Zandonà & Andrea Trani (ITA)
- 2002 – Nathan Wilmot & Malcolm Page (AUS)
- 2003 – Yevhen Braslavets & Ihor Matviyenko (UKR)
- 2004 – Gabrio Zandonà & Andrea Trani (ITA)
- 2005 – Michael Anderson-Mitterling & Dave Hughes (USA)
- 2006 – Mathew Belcher & Nick Behrens (AUS)
- 2007 – Gabrio Zandonà & Andrea Trani (ITA)
- 2008 – Tobias Etter & Felix Steiger (SUI)
- 2009 – Šime Fantela & Igor Marenić (CRO)
- 2010 – Mathew Belcher & Malcolm Page (AUS)
- 2011 – Mathew Belcher & Malcolm Page (AUS)
- 2012 – Ferdinand Gerz & Patrick Follmann (GER)
- 2013 – Luke Patience & Joe Glanfield (GBR)
- 2014 – Panagiotis Mantis & Pavlos Kagialis (GRE)
- 2015 – Šime Fantela & Igor Marenić (CRO)
- 2016 – Ferdinand Gerz & Oliver Szymanski (GER)
- 2017 – Mathew Belcher & Will Ryan (AUS)
- 2018 – Mathew Belcher & Will Ryan (AUS)

=== Women's 470 ===
- 1987 – Fiona Galloway (NZL)
- 1988 – Susanne Meyer (FRG)
- 1989 – Susanne Meyer (FRG)
- 1990 – Susanne Meyer (FRG)
- 1991 – Larisa Moskalenko (URS)
- 1992 – Yumiko Shige (JPN)
- 1993 – Susanne Meyer & Katrin Adlkofer (GER)
- 1994 – Yumiko Shige & Alicia Kinoshita (JPN)
- 1995 – Yumiko Shige & Alicia Kinoshita (JPN)
- 1996 – Vlada Kravchun & Nataliya Gaponovich (UKR)
- 1997 – Ruslana Taran & Olena Pakholchyk (UKR)
- 1998 – Susanne Ward & Michaëla Ward (DEN)
- 1999 – Ruslana Taran & Olena Pakholchyk (UKR)
- 2000 – Ruslana Taran & Olena Pakholchyk (UKR)
- 2001 – Sofia Bekatorou & Emilia Tsoulfa (GRE)
- 2002 – Jenny Armstrong & Belinda Stowell (AUS)
- 2003 – Alina Grobe & Vivien Kussatz (GER)
- 2004 – Jenny Armstrong & Belinda Stowell (AUS)
- 2005 – Elise Rechichi & Tessa Parkinson (AUS)
- 2006 – Elise Rechichi & Tessa Parkinson (AUS)
- 2007 – Sylvia Vogl & Carolina Flatscher (AUT)
- 2008 – Ai Kondo & Naoko Kamata (JPN)
- 2009 – Lisa Westerhof & Lobke Berkhout (NED)
- 2010 – Sarah Ayton & Saskia Clark (GBR)
- 2011 – Erin Maxwell & Isabelle Farrar (USA)
- 2012 – Annika Bochmann & Elisabeth Panuschka (GER)
- 2013 – Sophie Weguelin & Eilidh McIntyre (GBR)
- 2014 – Annina Wagner & Elisabeth Panuschka (GER)
- 2015 – Lara Vadlau & Jolanta Ogar (AUT)
- 2016 – Alisa Kirilyuk & Lyudmila Dmitriyeva (RUS)
- 2017 – Frederike Loewe & Anna Markfort (GER)
- 2018 – Silvia Mas & Patricia Cantero (ESP)

=== Mixed 470 ===
- 2022 – Malte Winkel & Anastasiya Winkel (GER)

=== 505 ===
- 1994 – Tim Böger & Holger Jess (GER)
- 1995 – Jeremy Robinson & Bill Masterman (GBR)
- 1996 – Thomas Gosch & Rolf Meyer (GER)
- 1997 – Wolfgang Hunger & Holger Jess (GER)
- 1998 – Wolfgang Hunger & Holger Jess (GER)
- 1999 – Wolfgang Hunger & Holger Jess (GER)
- 2000 – Wolfgang Hunger & Holger Jess (GER)
- 2001 – Krister Bergström & Thomas Moss (SWE)
- 2002 – Wolfgang Hunger & Holger Jess (GER)
- 2003 – Claas Lehmann & Martin Schöler (GER)
- 2004 – Wolfgang Hunger & Holger Jess (GER)
- 2005 – Claas Lehmann & Martin Schöler (GER)
- 2006 – Jan Saugmann & Morten Ramsbæk (DEN)
- 2007 – Wolfgang Hunger & Holger Jess (GER)
- 2008 – Wolfgang Hunger & Julien Kleiner (GER)
- 2009 – Wolfgang Hunger & Julien Kleiner (GER)
- 2010 – Wolfgang Hunger & Julien Kleiner (GER)
- 2011 – Wolfgang Hunger & Julien Kleiner (GER)
- 2012 – Wolfgang Hunger & Julien Kleiner (GER)
- 2013 – Wolfgang Hunger & Julien Kleiner (GER)
- 2014 – Jan-Philipp Hofmann & Felix Brockerhoff (GER)
- 2015 – Meike Schomäker & Holger Jess (GER)
- 2016 – Andy Smith & Tim Needham (GBR)
- 2017 – Jørgen Bojsen-Møller & Jacob Bojsen-Møller (DEN)
- 2018 – Michael Quirk & Holger Jess (AUS)
- 2019 – Wolfgang Hunger & Holger Jess (GER)
- 2020 – Wolfgang Hunger & Holger Jess (GER)
- 2021 – Wolfgang Hunger & Holger Jess (GER)

=== 29er ===
- 2005 – Benjamin Friedhoff & Johanna Munding (GER)
- 2006 – Benjamin Friedhoff & Johanna Munding (GER)
- 2007 – Benjamin Friedhoff & Johanna Munding (GER)
- 2008 – Kévin Fischer & Glenn Gouron (FRA)
- 2009 – Kévin Fischer & Glenn Gouron (FRA)
- 2010 – Domagoj Fižulić & Tomislav Bašić (CRO)
- 2011 – Josh Franklin & Lewis Brake (AUS)
- 2012 – Carlos Robles & Florián Trittel (ESP)
- 2013 – Lucas Rual & Émile Amoros (FRA)
- 2014 – Adrian Salamon & Julius Hallström (SWE)
- 2015 – Peter Lin Janežič & Anže Podlogar (SLO)
- 2016 – Gwendal Lamay & Luke Willim (GER)
- 2017 – Benjamin Jaffrezic & Léo Chauvel (FRA)
- 2018 – Mathias Berthet & Alexander Franks-Penty (NOR)
- 2019 – Mathias Berthet & Alexander Franks-Penty (NOR)
- 2020 – Richard Schultheis & Max Körner (MLT)
- 2021 – Anton Sach & Johann Sach (GER)
- 2022 – George Lee Rush & Sebastian Menzies (NZL)

=== 29er XX ===
- 2011 – Paris Henken (USA)

=== 49er ===
- 1997 – Chris Nicholson & Daniel Phillips (AUS)
- 1998 – Francesco Bruni & Gabriele Bruni (ITA)
- 1999 – Adam Beashel & Teague Czislowski (AUS)
- 2000 – Francesco Bruni & Gabriele Bruni (ITA)
- 2001 – Paul Brotherton & Simon Hiscocks (GBR)
- 2002 – Tom Fitzpatrick & Fraser Brown (IRL)
- 2003 – Chris Draper & Simon Hiscocks (GBR)
- 2004 – Pietro Sibello & Gianfranco Sibello (ITA)
- 2005 – Chris Draper & Simon Hiscocks (GBR)
- 2006 – Pietro Sibello & Gianfranco Sibello (ITA)
- 2007 – Marcus Baur & Hannes Baumann (GER)
- 2008 – Iker Martínez de Lizarduy & Xabier Fernández (ESP)
- 2009 – Lennart Briesenick Pudenz & Morten Massmann (GER)
- 2010 – John Pink & Rick Peacock (GBR)
- 2011 – Tobias Schadewaldt & Hannes Baumann (GER)
- 2012 – Tobias Schadewaldt & Hannes Baumann (GER)
- 2013 – Nico Delle Karth & Nikolaus Resch (AUT)
- 2014 – Erik Heil & Thomas Plößel (GER)
- 2015 – Justus Schmidt & Max Boehme (GER)
- 2016 – Peter Burling & Blair Tuke (NZL)
- 2017 – David Gilmour & Joel Turner (AUS)
- 2018 – Jonas Warrer & Jakob Precht Jensen (DEN)
- 2019 – Logan Dunning Beck & Oscar Gunn (NZL)
- 2020 – Jonas Warrer & Jakob Precht Jensen (DEN)
- 2022 – James Peters & Fynn Sterritt (GBR)

=== 49er FX ===
- 2013 – Tina Lutz & Susann Beucke (GER)
- 2014 – Támara Echegoyen & Berta Betanzos (ESP)
- 2015 – Annemiek Bekkering & Daniel Bramervaer (NED)
- 2016 – Tina Lutz & Susann Beucke (GER)
- 2017 – Charlotte Dobson & Saskia Tidey (GBR)
- 2018 – Alex Maloney & Molly Meech (NZL)
- 2019 – Victoria Jurczok & Anika Lorenz (GER)
- 2020 – Tina Lutz & Susann Beucke (GER)
- 2022 – Sophie Steinlein & Thomas Plößel (GER)

=== Flying Dutchman ===
- 1987 – Sergey Borodinov (URS)
- 1988 – Jørgen Bojsen-Møller (DEN)
- 1989 – Willem Potma (NED)
- 1990 – Jörn Borowski (FRG)
- 1991 – Markus Wieser (GER)
- 1992 – Markus Wieser (GER)
- 1993 – Bojsen-Møller & Jespersen (DEN)
- 1994 – Jørgen Bojsen-Møller & Jacob Bojsen-Møller (DEN)
- 1996 – Eddy Eich & Ben Hagemeyer (GER)
- 1997 – Jørgen Bojsen-Møller & Jacob Bojsen-Møller (DEN)
- 1998 – Jørgen Bojsen-Møller & Jacob Bojsen-Møller (DEN)
- 1999 – Jørgen Bojsen-Møller & Jacob Bojsen-Møller (DEN)
- 2000 – Jørgen Bojsen-Møller & Jacob Bojsen-Møller (DEN)
- 2001 – Jørgen Bojsen-Møller & Jacob Bojsen-Møller (DEN)
- 2002 – Hans Genthe & Hauke Drengenberg (GER)
- 2003 – Jørgen Bojsen-Møller & Jacob Bojsen-Møller (DEN)
- 2004 – Jørgen Bojsen-Møller & Jacob Bojsen-Møller (DEN)
- 2005 – Jørgen Bojsen-Møller & Jacob Bojsen-Møller (DEN)
- 2006 – Jørgen Bojsen-Møller & Jacob Bojsen-Møller (DEN)
- 2007 – Jørgen Bojsen-Møller & Jacob Bojsen-Møller (DEN)
- 2008 – Jørgen Bojsen-Møller & Jacob Bojsen-Møller (DEN)
- 2009 – Szabolcs Majthényi & András Domokos (HUN)
- 2010 – Szabolcs Majthényi & András Domokos (HUN)
- 2011 – Szabolcs Majthényi & András Domokos (HUN)
- 2012 – Szabolcs Majthényi & András Domokos (HUN)
- 2013 – Kilian König & Johannes Brack (GER)
- 2014 – Szabolcs Majthényi & András Domokos (HUN)
- 2015 – Shmuel Markhoff & Michael Happich (GER)
- 2016 – Kilian König & Johannes Brack (GER)
- 2017 – Kay-Uwe Lüdtke & Kai Schäfers (GER)
- 2018 – Kay-Uwe Lüdtke & Kai Schäfers (GER)
- 2019 – Szabolcs Majthényi & András Domokos (HUN)
- 2022 – Szabolcs Majthényi & András Domokos (HUN)

=== Pirat ===
- 1997 – Dirk Bogumil & Falko Bier (GER)
- 1998 – Karsten Bredt & Caroline Hunds (GER)
- 1999 – Frank Schönfeldt & Jochen Wolfram (GER)
- 2000 – Frank Schönfeldt & Iwan Duschko (GER)
- 2001 – Dirk Strelow & Elmar Schmitz (GER)
- 2002 – Frank Schönfeldt & Sven Gräpel (GER)
- 2003 – Jörg Säger & Jens Schreiber (GER)
- 2004 – Karsten Bredt & Malte Frese (GER)
- 2005 – Frank Schönfeldt & Dennis Ruge (GER)
- 2006 – Thomas Heldt & Ludger Wetzke (GER)
- 2007 – Ralf Strzelecki & Frank Thieme (GER)
- 2008 – Frank Schönfeldt & Finn Möller (GER)

=== RS 800 ===
- 2015 – Phil Walker & John Mather (GBR)

=== 12 Metre ===
- 2015 – Anitra – Josef Martin, Sven Oliver Buder, Tim Eggert, Peter Graf, Oliver Huber, Dierck Jensen, Andre Koslowsky, Johann Kraus, Wolfgang Leuthe, Björn Leuthe, Sven Martin, Petra Mehrbad, David Segbert & Ulli Sommerlath (USA)
- 2016 – Vim – Andrea Proto, Troels Bækholm, Mads Groth, Jens Holmberg, Caspar Kiellerop Larsen, Jens Möller, Lef Motte, Peter Müller, Leerke Nergaavel, Nikolaj Nielsen, Tommy Olsson, Natale Proto, Ole Skov, Mads Walther, Stig Westergaard & Stefan Zeyse (USA)
- 2017 – Kiwi Magic – Johan Blach Petersen (DEN)

=== 2.4 Metre ===
- 2002 – Heiko Kröger (GER)
- 2003 – Jens Als Andersen (DEN)
- 2004 – Heiko Kröger (GER)
- 2005 – Heiko Kröger (GER)
- 2006 – Damien Seguin (FRA)
- 2007 – Thierry Schmitter (NED)
- 2008 – Damien Seguin (FRA)
- 2009 – Heiko Kröger (GER)
- 2009 – Thierry Schmitter (NED)
- 2010 – Heiko Kröger (GER)
- 2011 – Megan Pascoe (GBR)
- 2012 – Damien Seguin (FRA)
- 2013 – Heiko Kröger (GER)
- 2014 – Heiko Kröger (GER)
- 2015 – Heiko Kröger (GER)
- 2016 – Heiko Kröger (GER)
- 2017 – Heiko Kröger (GER)
- 2018 – Damien Seguin (FRA)
- 2019 – Heiko Kröger (GER)
- 2021 – Heiko Kröger (GER)
- 2022 – Heiko Kröger (GER)

=== 5.5 Metre ===
- 2001 – Gordon Ingate, James Bevis & David Ellis (AUS)
- 2016 – Ger Schmitz, Uli Ellerbeck & Gerhard Kruse (GER)
- 2017 – Hans Köster, Johannes Hensler, Jacob Oersted & Lea Rüdiger (GER)

=== Albin Express ===
- 2013 – Morten Arndal, Martin Dyxenburg, Anette B. Hansen, Jacob Kræs & Dennis Petersen (DEN)
- 2014 – Arne K. Larssen, Nils Albrecht, Sebastian Hantke, Steffen Mühlenkamp & Merle Risy (SWE)
- 2015 – Arne K. Larssen (SWE)
- 2016 – Jan Brink, Jan Günther, Jens Lücke & Jörg Rüterhenke (GER)
- 2017 – Jan Brink, Jan Günther, Jörg Rüterhenke & Lasse Waltje (GER)
- 2018 – Jesper Nørbo Sørensen, Erik Andersen, Rasmus Christensen & Jesper Schøllhammer (DEN)

=== B/one ===
- 2013 – Gordon Nickel, Morten Nickel, Patrick Priebe & Sebastian Röske (GER)

=== Dehler 29 ===
- 1998 – Bruhns Arnt (GER)

=== Dragon ===
- 1987 – Markus Glas (FRG)
- 1988 – Horst-Wilhelm Ströh (FRG)
- 1989 – Steen Kjølhede (DEN)
- 1990 – Lars Jensen (DEN)
- 1991 – Lars Jensen (DEN)
- 1992 – Joachim Griese (GER)
- 1993 – Lars Jensen (DEN)
- 1994 – Wolfgang Rappel, Bärbel Mang & Wolfgang Rappel Jr. (GER)
- 1995 – Vincent Hösch, Florian Fendt & Michael Lipp (GER)
- 1996 – Harm Müller-Spreer, Björn Österreich & Laurent Scheel (GER)
- 1997 – Vincent Hösch, Stefan Abel & Thomas Mayer (GER)
- 1998 – Malte Philipp, Torsten Imbeck & Harald Weichert (GER)
- 1999 – Poul Richard Høj Jensen, Stephan Boyle & Ruan O'Tiarnaigh (GBR)
- 2000 – Malte Philipp, Torsten Imbeck & Harald Weichert (GER)
- 2001 – Frank Eriksen, Ole Børresen & Christian Just (DEN)
- 2002 – Harm Müller-Spreer, Thomas Auracher & Vincent Hösch (GER)
- 2003 – Harm Müller-Spreer (GER)
- 2004 – Jørgen Schönherr, Andreas Kæmpe & Axel Waldersdorph (DEN)
- 2005 – Dirk David, Stefan Abel & Jörg Strube (GER)
- 2006 – Thomas Müller, Vincent Hösch & Max Scheibmeier (GER)
- 2007 – Fritz Werner, Thomas Auracher & Sergey Pugachev (GER)
- 2008 – Markus Wieser, Thomas Auracher & Sergey Pugachev (UKR)
- 2009 – Markus Wieser, George Leonchuk & Sergey Pugachev (UKR)
- 2010 – Ben van Cauwenbergh, Yves Bassette & Manu Hens (BEL)
- 2011 – Thomas Müller, Vincent Hösch & Michael Lipp (GER)

=== Elliott 6m ===
- 2009 – Katie Spithill, Nina Curtis & Nicole Douglass (AUS)
- 2010 – Yekaterina Skudina, Irina Lotsmanova & Yelena Syuzeva (RUS)
- 2011 – Yekaterina Skudina, Yelena Oblova & Yelena Syuzeva (RUS)

=== Farr 30 ===
- 2015 – Harald Brüning (GER)

=== H-boat ===
- 1987 – Juhani Seppä (FIN)
- 1988 – Gerd Eiermann (FRG)
- 1989 – Gerd Eiermann (FRG)
- 1990 – Henrik Edman (SWE)
- 1991 – Gerd Eiermann (GER)
- 1992 – Theis Palm (DEN)
- 1993 – Vincent Hösch (GER)
- 1994 – Vincent Hösch, Stefan Abel & Wolfgang Nothegger (GER)
- 1995 – Ross MacDonald, Hugo Dölfes & Phil Trinter (USA)
- 1996 – Wolfgang Döring, Karsten Bredt & Sönke Wunderlich (GER)
- 1997 – Herluf Jørgensen, Søren Nielsen & Chrestian Pasbjerg (DEN)
- 1998 – Herluf Jørgensen, Chrestian Pasbjerg & Per Petersen (DEN)
- 1999 – Bo Selko, Jonas Pedersen & Niels Sørensen (DEN)
- 2000 – Bo Selko, Kenneth Bøggild & Jonas Pedersen (DEN)
- 2001 – Dirk Stadler, Kai Schnellbacher & Nils Ubert (GER)
- 2002 – Herluf Jørgensen, Fin Nicolaisen & Chrestian Pasbjerg (DEN)
- 2003 – Harald Wefers, Sönke Durst & Niels Körte (GER)
- 2004 – Herluf Jørgensen, Christian Justesen & Chrestian Pasbjerg (DEN)
- 2005 – Morten Nielsen, Niels Henrik Borch & Per Kloster (DEN)
- 2006 – Hans Peulen, Peter Snellens & Patrick Vraneken (NED)
- 2007 – Steffen Stegger, Lars Christiansen & Carsten Pedersen Guffi (DEN)
- 2008 – Steffen Stegger, Lars Christiansen & Carsten Pedersen Guffi (DEN)
- 2009 – Steffen Stegger, Lars Christiansen & Carsten Pedersen Guffi (DEN)
- 2010 – Mads P. G. Korsgaard, Uffe Dreiser & Anders Rydlöv (DEN)
- 2011 – Steffen Stegger, Lars Christiansen & Carsten Pedersen Guffi (DEN)
- 2012 – Steffen Stegger, Lars Christiansen & Carsten Pedersen Guffi (DEN)
- 2013 – Morten Nielsen, Niels Henrik Borch & Per Kloster (DEN)
- 2015 – Peter Zauner, Maren Bertling, Frank Hummel & Timo von Schorlemer (GER)

=== Hansa 303 ===
- 2018 – Piotr Cichocki (POL)

=== J/24 ===
- 1987 – Maarten Kimman (NED)
- 1988 – Manfred König (FRG)
- 1989 – Holger Albert (FRG)
- 1990 – Jim Brady (USA)
- 1991 – Jan Kähler (GER)
- 1992 – Manfred König (GER)
- 1993 – Manfred König (GER)
- 1994 – Jan Kähler, Jan Mathies, Sönke Pohl, Kay Sörensen & Dirk Wulbieter (GER)
- 1995 – Jan Kähler, Frank Kuhlmann, Jan Mathies, Volker Riechers & Kay Sörensen (GER)
- 1996 – Thomas Ross, Helge Homann & Haucke Krüss (GER)
- 1997 – Ross, Eichenauer, Homann, Klinger & Krüss (GER)
- 1998 – Frans van der Wel, Ton Bos, Jouco Huisman, Raymond Maes & Jan Slot (NED)
- 1999 – Frans van der Wel, Peter Horsselenberg, Jouco Huisman, Raymond Maes & Jules Peters (NED)
- 2000 – Stenum, Drotz, Hermansson, Wallentin & Wallentin (SWE)
- 2001 – Niklas Stenum, Janne Drotz, Anders Hermansson, Markus Wallentin & Mattias Wallentin (SWE)
- 2002 – Leif Tom Loose, Nils Keck, Jan-Marc Ulrich & Nick von der Wense (GER)
- 2003 – Albert Kooijmann, Robert Bagges, Mark Brouwer, Boris Bulk & Fred Bulk (NED)
- 2004 – Jan Kähler, Karsten Kerschies, Tobias Peters, Marc Schleifer & Sascha Tippe (GER)
- 2005 – Hauke Krüss, Nils Keck, Phillip Nann, Jan-Marc Ulrich & Mattias Wallentin (GER)
- 2006 – Stefan Karsunke, C. Demuth, F. Feindt, M. Gibbe, T. Habekost & T. Paech (GER)
- 2007 – Greg Wilcox, Tim Becker, Philip Nann, Jan-Marc Ulrich & Mattias Wallentin (GER)
- 2008 – Greg Wilcox, Tim Becker, Philip Nann, Jan-Marc Ulrich & Mattias Wallentin (GER)
- 2009 – Peer Kock, Ole Hilcken, Marc-Daniel Mählmann & Hannes Pagel (GER)
- 2010 – Christopher McLaughlin, Michael Kyte, Chris McLaughlin, Andy McLelland & Julia Scott (GBR)
- 2011 – Anna Gunnarsson, Dan Fredskov, Max Hölzer, Marianne Schoke & Klaus Walkusch (SWE)
- 2012 – Kai Mares, Tobias Feuerherdt, Tobias Peters, Nils Schröder & Jan-Marc Ulrich (GER)
- 2013 – Peer Kock, Bendix Hügelmann, Marc-Daniel Mählmann, Dennis Ruge & Simon Zweigler (GER)
- 2014 – Frank Schönfeldt, Nicklas Feuerstein, Till Krüger, Finn Möller & Thorsten Sperl (GER)
- 2015 – Ian Southworth, David Howlett, Andy McLelland, Simon Philbrick & Julia Scott (GBR)
- 2016 – Tobias Feuerherdt, Lukas Feuerherdt, Justus Fritz Kellner, Tobias Peters & Jan-Marc Ulrich (GER)
- 2017 – Mike Ingham, Paul Abdullah, Max Hölzer, Marianne Schoke & Quinn Schwenker (USA)
- 2018 – Mike Ingham, Justin Coplan, Max Hölzer, Marianne Schoke & Quinn Schwenker (USA)
- 2019 – Keith Whittemore, Shelby Milne, Mark Rodgers, Brian Thomas & Willem Van Waay (USA)
- 2020 – Stefan Karsunke, Christian Carstens, Malte Gibbe, Tim Habekost & Carsten Kerschies (GER)
- 2021 – Fabian Damm, Moritz Böök, Jannik Dühren, Jonas Lyssewski & Thorsten Paech (GER)
- 2022 – Cillian Dickson, Ryan Glynn, Louis Mulloy, Sam O'Byrne & Marcus Ryan (IRL)

=== J/70 ===
- 2014 – Claas Lehmann, Björn Athmer, Marc-Daniel Möhlmann & Valentin Zeller (GER)
- 2015 – Hugo Rocha, Ruben Castells, Fran Palacios & Aleksey Semyonov (ESP)
- 2017 – Jens Marten, Justus Braatz, Terje Klockemann & Tobias Strenge (GER)
- 2018 – Björn Beilken, Alexander Beilken, Jork Homeyer & Tobias Teichmann (GER)
- 2019 – Carsten Kemmling, Matthias Adamczewski, Daniel Labhart & Peter Stein (GER)
- 2020 – Michael Grau, David Chapman, Gerald Mitchel & Florian Thoelen (GER)
- 2021 – Claas Lehmann, Juliane Adelssen, Tobias Konow, Frederike Loewe & Cedric Menzel (GER)
- 2022 – Carsten Kemmling, Daniel Labhart, Luke Willim & Rob Willim (GER)

=== J/80 ===
- 2013 – Martin Menzner, Carsten Hopp, Frank Lichte & Mika Rolfs (GER)
- 2014 – Martin Menzner, Carsten Hopp, Frank Lichte & Mika Rolfs (GER)
- 2015 – Martin Menzner, Carsten Hopp, Frank Lichte & Mika Rolfs (GER)
- 2016 – Martin Menzner, Nils Beltermann, Frank Lichte & Mika Rolfs (GER)
- 2017 – Martin Menzner, Nils Beltermann, Frank Lichte & Mika Rolfs (GER)
- 2018 – Martin Menzner, Nils Beltermann, Frank Lichte & Jens Schwer (GER)
- 2019 – Arne Wilcken, Iver Hadler, Thore Hansen & Markus Scheel (GER)
- 2020 – Martin Menzner, Nils Beltermann, Frank Lichte & Mika Rolfs (GER)

=== Kielzugvogel ===
- 1987 – Torsten Wagner (FRG)
- 1988 – Peter Linnekuhl (FRG)
- 1989 – Torsten Wagner (FRG)
- 1990 – Thomas Schiffer (FRG)
- 1991 – Christian Schäfer (GER)
- 1992 – Thomas Schiffer (GER)
- 1993 – Gerd Eiermann (GER)
- 1994 – Gerd Eiermann & Nils Ubert (GER)
- 1995 – Gerd Eiermann & Oliver Babik (GER)
- 1996 – Gerd Eiermann & Ulrich Hemink (GER)
- 1997 – Thomas Schiffer & Thomas Kindermann (GER)
- 1998 – Gerd Eiermann (GER)
- 2010 – Jens Liebheim & Thomas Kindermann (GER)

=== Melges 24 ===
- 1998 – Giorgio Zuccoli (ITA)
- 2013 – Riccardo Simoneschi, Federico Buscaglia, Enrico Fonda, Lucia Giorgetti & Vittorio Rosso (ITA)
- 2014 – Riccardo Simoneschi, Federico Buscaglia, Enrico Fonda, Lucia Giorgetti & Stefano Orlandi (ITA)
- 2015 – Kim Christensen, Céline Carlsen, Henriette Frislev, Peter Jakobsen & Jamie Lea (DEN)
- 2016 – Andrea Pozzi, Stefan Ciampalini, Nicolas Dal Ferro, Giulio Desiderato & Carlo Zermini (ITA)
- 2017 – Lennart Burke, Valentin Ahlhaus, Johan Müller, Thore Petersen & Daniel Schmidt (GER)

=== Nordic Folkboat ===
- 1957 – Ejnar Christensen (DEN)
- 1958 – Henning Olsen (DEN)
- 1959 – Ejnar Christensen (DEN)
- 1960 – Christian Lageri-Schmidt (DEN)
- 1961 – Henning Olsen (DEN)
- 1962 – Børge Jespersen (DEN)
- 1963 – Mogens Petersen (DEN)
- 1964 – Mogens Petersen (DEN)
- 1965 – Mogens Petersen (DEN)
- 1966 – G. Kroll (FRG)
- 1967 – Claus Hjort, Karsten Ask & Ove Hjort (DEN)
- 1968 – Claus Hjort, Karsten Ask & Ove Hjort (DEN)
- 1969 – Claus Hjort, Karsten Ask & Ove Hjort (DEN)
- 1970 – Claus Hjort, Karsten Ask & Ove Hjort (DEN)
- 1971 – Walther Muhs (FRG)
- 1972 – Andreas Christiansen & Knud Christiansen (FRG)
- 1973 – Claus Hjort, Karsten Ask & Ove Hjort (DEN)
- 1974 – Claus Hjort, Karsten Ask & Ove Hjort (DEN)
- 1975 – Erik Andreasen, Jørgen Knudsen & Chresten Kold (DEN)
- 1976 – Claus Hjort, Karsten Ask & Ove Hjort (DEN)
- 1977 – Flemming Hansen, Niels Andersen & Bent Christensen (DEN)
- 1978 – Ernst August Rasmussen, Aksel Andreasen & Klaus Rasmussen (DEN)
- 1979 – Dieter Kipcke (FRG)
- 1980 – Henrik Kold (DEN)
- 1981 – Erik Andreasen, Jens Budtz, Mogens Pedersen & Peter West (DEN)
- 1982 – Henrik Sørensen, Erling Rasmussen & John Skjoldby (DEN)
- 1983 – Erik Andreasen (DEN)
- 1984 – Rene Mørch, Lauge Larsen & Stig Pallisbeck (DEN)
- 1985 – Rene Mørch, Lauge Larsen & Stig Pallisbeck (DEN)
- 1986 – Erik Andreasen, Lotte Andreasen, Mette S. Andersen & Bjørn Clausen (DEN)
- 1987 – Rene Mørch, Lauge Larsen & John Skjoldby (DEN)
- 1988 – Horst Stephan Schultze (FRG)
- 1989 – Erik Andreasen, Poul S. Andersen & Poul Ankjær (DEN)
- 1990 – Manfred Baum, Ursula Optenhögel & Jürgen Wriedt (FRG)
- 1991 – Flemming Rost, Mike Rasmussen & Ketty G. Rost (DEN)
- 1992 – Jürgen Breitenbach (GER)
- 1993 – Henrik Reese, Aksel Andreasen & Claus Reese (DEN)
- 1994 – Erik Andreasen, Poul Ankjær & Mogens Pedersen (DEN)
- 1995 – Jesper Bendix, Jesper Baungaard & Jacob Gronsbach (DEN)
- 1996 – Torben Olesen, Lars Dalbøge & Palle Hemdorf (DEN)
- 1997 – Peter Due, Ole Christensen & Kurt Petersen (DEN)
- 1998 – Henrik Kold, Jens Lorentzen & Claus Skov Nielsen (DEN)
- 1999 – Henrik Kold, Per Hovmark & Claus Skov Nielsen (DEN)
- 2000 – Jens Thurøe, Knud Andersen & Mette Thurøe (DEN)
- 2001 – Kim Fogde, Peter Andersen & Tonny Poulsen (DEN)
- 2002 – Per Hovmark, Søren Bredal & Claus Lauritsen (DEN)
- 2003 – Per Jørgensen, Lars Jørgensen & Claus Skov Nielsen (DEN)
- 2004 – Kim Fogde, Allan Hansen & Tonny Poulsen (DEN)
- 2005 – Per Jørgensen, Lars Jørgensen & Claus Skov Nielsen (DEN)
- 2006 – Christoph Nielsen, Björge Dehn & Torben Dehn (GER)
- 2007 – Christoph Nielsen, Torben Dehn & Jimi Reichenberger (GER)
- 2008 – Per Jørgensen, Kristian Hansen & Lars Jørgensen (DEN)
- 2009 – Christoph Nielsen, Torben Dehn & Krzystof Paschke (GER)
- 2010 – Per Jørgensen, Kristian Hansen & Kjeld Skov (DEN)
- 2011 – John Wulff, Benny Christensen & Bent Nielsen (DEN)
- 2012 – Walther Furthmann, Paul Girolstein & Hans Christian Mrowka (GER)
- 2013 – Christoph Nielsen, Torben Dehn, Florian Raudaschl & Klaus Reichenberger (GER)
- 2014 – Per Buch, Per Puck & Hans Schultz (DEN)
- 2015 – Ulf Kipcke, Dieter Kipcke & Gero Martens (GER)
- 2016 – Ulf Kipcke, Dieter Kipcke & Gero Martens (GER)
- 2017 – Per Jørgensen, Kristian Hansen & Bent Nielsen (DEN)
- 2018 – Sönke Durst, Marc Rokicki & Ulrich Schaefer (GER)
- 2022 – Søren Kæstel, Erik Andersen & Alex Lindegaard (DEN)

=== Platu 25 ===
- 2004 – Philip Kadelbach, Jan Böttcher, Solveig Boy, Marc Föge & Sven Kruse (GER)
- 2005 – Kai Mares, Sönke Boy, Gavin Grebe, Flo Kirchner & Uwe Mares (GER)
- 2006 – Kai Mares, Gavin Grebe, Flo Kirchner, Uwe Mares & D. Pontoppidan (GER)
- 2007 – Niklas Ganssauge, Jan Böttcher, May-Britt Boy, Bernhard Krüger, Sven Kruse & Thomas Kruse (GER)
- 2008 – Mads Christensen, Anders Fisker, Simon Mörup-Petersen & Casper Peetz (GER)
- 2009 – Peter Wibroe, Chris Goldhammer, Hugge Hviid-Nielsen & Niels Kink (GER)
- 2010 – Martin Sigrist, Matthias Bosshart, Simon Brügger, Benjamin Dierauer & Luca Gerig (SUI)
- 2011 – Sven-Erik Horsch, Ann Cathrein Jacobsen, Thorben Nowak, Ole von Studnitz & Frank Wegener (GER)
- 2012 – Ingo Lochmann, Timo Chorrosch, Matthias Krüger, Christian Maedel & Jens Steinborn (GER)
- 2013 – Ingo Lochmann, Timo Chorrosch, Matthias Krüger, Christian Maedel & Jens Steinborn (GER)
- 2014 – Gordon Nickel, Nils Merten Färber, Nils-Mathes Fiege, Morten Nickel & Sebastian Röske (GER)

=== SB 20 ===
- 2013 – Daniel Spänle, Ines Herbold, Konstantin Krauß & Tobias Spänle (GER)
- 2014 – Aleksey Murashkin, Kirill Frolov & Yegor Ignatenko (RUS)

=== Soling ===
- 1987 – Jochen Schümann (FRG)
- 1988 – Jochen Schümann (FRG)
- 1989 – Jochen Schümann (FRG)
- 1990 – Jochen Schümann (FRG)
- 1991 – Jesper Bank (DEN)
- 1992 – Kevin Mahaney (USA)
- 1993 – Jochen Schümann (GER)
- 1994 – Jesper Bank, Thomas Jacobsen & Kræn Nielsen (DEN)
- 1995 – Andy Beadsworth, Barry Parkin & Adrian Stead (GBR)
- 1996 – Jesper Bendix, Jesper Baungaard & Jacob Gronsbach (DEN)
- 1997 – Jochen Schümann, Gunnar Bahr & Ingo Borkowski (GER)
- 1998 – Presti (FRA)

=== Sonar ===
- 2014 – Jens Kroker, Siegmund Mainka & Robert Prem (GER)
- 2016 – Lasse Klötzing, Jens Kroker & Siegmund Mainka (GER)

=== Star ===
- 1931 – Mia VII – Andersen (GER)
- 1933 – Uzel II – Lubinus (GER)
- 1934 – Hilda II – Theodore Giesecke (GER)
- 1935 – Pimm – Walter von Hütschler & P. W. Hachman (GER)
- 1936 – Pimm – Walter von Hütschler (GER)
- 1937 – Gemma – Agostino Straulino (ITA)
- 1938 – Marinestation der Ostsee (GER)
- 1939 – Polluce – Renato d'Ottaviano & Giuseppe Bignami (ITA)
- 1987 – Ed Adams (USA)
- 1988 – Anders Geert Jensen (DEN)
- 1989 – Torben Grael (BRA)
- 1990 – Torben Grael (BRA)
- 1991 – Hans Vogt Jr. (GER)
- 1992 – Torben Grael (BRA)
- 1993 – Alexander Hagen & Falkenthal (GER)
- 1994 – Hans Wallén & Bobby Lohse (SWE)
- 1995 – Torben Grael & Marcelo Ferreira (BRA)
- 1996 – Colin Beashel & David Giles (AUS)
- 1997 – Frank Butzmann & Jens Peters (GER)
- 1998 – Colin Beashel & David Giles (AUS)
- 1999 – Mats Johansson & Leif Möller (SWE)
- 2000 – Mark Reynolds & Magnus Liljedahl (USA)
- 2001 – Torben Grael & Marcelo Ferreira (BRA)
- 2002 – Mark Reynolds & Magnus Liljedahl (USA)
- 2003 – Marc Aurel Pickel & Tony Kolb (GER)
- 2004 – Peter Bromby & Lee White (BER)
- 2005 – Mateusz Kusznierewicz & Dominik Życki (POL)
- 2006 – Mark Mendelblatt & Mark Strube (USA)
- 2007 – Hans Spitzauer & Christian Nehammer (AUT)
- 2008 – Fredrik Lööf & Anders Ekström (SWE)
- 2009 – Mark Mendelblatt & Mark Strube (USA)
- 2010 – Robert Scheidt & Bruno Prada (BRA)
- 2011 – Flavio Marazzi & Enrico De Maria (SUI)
- 2012 – Johannes Polgar & Markus Koy (GER)
- 2013 – Denis Khashina & Dmitry Mechetin (UKR)

=== Yngling ===
- 2001 – Annelie Thies, Claar van der Does & Petronella de Jong (NED)
- 2002 – Ulrike Schümann, Wibke Bülle & Winnie Lippert (GER)
- 2003 – Dorte Jensen, Helle Jespersen & Rachel Kiel (DEN)
- 2004 – Kristin Wagner, Anne Höll & Veronika Lochbrunner (GER)
- 2005 – Yekaterina Skudina, Diana Krutskina & Tatyana Lartseva (RUS)

=== A-cat ===
- 2011 – Jack Benson (AUS)

=== Formula 18 ===
- 2006 – Helge Sach & Christian Sach (GER)
- 2007 – Helge Sach & Christian Sach (GER)
- 2008 – Jörg Gösche & Hannes Pegel (GER)
- 2009 – Helge Sach & Christian Sach (GER)
- 2010 – Helge Sach & Christian Sach (GER)
- 2011 – Helge Sach & Christian Sach (GER)
- 2012 – Jörg Gösche & Hannes Pegel (GER)
- 2013 – Helge Sach & Christian Sach (GER)
- 2014 – Helge Sach & Christian Sach (GER)
- 2015 – Helge Sach & Christian Sach (GER)
- 2016 – Helge Sach & Christian Sach (GER)
- 2017 – Iordanis Paschalidis & Konstantinos Trigkonis (GRE)
- 2018 – Martin Friedrichsen & Björn Wendel (GER)
- 2020 – Cedric Bader & Nicolaj Bjørnholt Christensen (FRA)

=== Hobie 16 ===
- 1989 – Detlef Mohr (FRG)
- 1990 – Matthias Stender (FRG)
- 1991 – Joachim Dangel (GER)
- 1992 – Detlef Mohr (GER)
- 1993 – Stoll & Köllnberger (GER)
- 1994 – Andreas Bredendiek & Niels Fröhmer (GER)
- 1995 – Christian Stoll & Ines Roßley (GER)
- 1996 – Detlef Mohr & Joachim Wegener (GER)
- 1997 – Jürgen Schönfeld & Martin Arndt (GER)
- 1998 – Christian Stoll & Frederike Paulick (GER)
- 1999 – Detlef Mohr & Reinhold Mohr (GER)
- 2000 – Detlef Mohr & Reinhold Mohr (GER)
- 2001 – Detlef Mohr & Reinhold Mohr (GER)
- 2002 – Georg Backes & Simone Monreal (GER)
- 2003 – Georg Backes & Simone Monreal (GER)
- 2004 – Ingo Delius & Katrin Wiese-Dohse (GER)
- 2005 – Ingo Delius & Katrin Wiese-Dohse (GER)
- 2006 – Melcom Huang & Pei Quan Chung (SGP)
- 2007 – Ingo Delius & Katrin Wiese-Dohse (GER)
- 2008 – Detlef Mohr & Karen Wichardt (GER)
- 2009 – Detlef Mohr & Karen Wichardt (GER)
- 2010 – Wee Chin Teo & Justin Wong (SGP)
- 2011 – Detlef Mohr & Karen Wichardt (GER)
- 2012 – Detlef Mohr & Karen Wichardt (GER)
- 2013 – Stefan Wiese-Dohse & Susanne Gehrmann (GER)
- 2014 – Lauritz Bockelmann & Tobias Tittjung (GER)
- 2015 – Detlef Mohr & Karen Wichardt (GER)
- 2016 – Ingo Delius & Kai Tittjung (GER)
- 2017 – Knud Jansen & Christina Schober (GER)
- 2018 – Lauritz Bockelmann & Anke Delius (GER)

=== Nacra 17 ===
- 2013 – Iker Martínez de Lizarduy & Tara Pacheco (ESP)
- 2014 – Vittorio Bissaro & Silvia Sicouri (ITA)
- 2015 – Paul Kohlhoff & Carolina Werner (GER)
- 2016 – Paul Kohlhoff & Carolina Werner (GER)
- 2017 – Thomas Zajac & Barbara Matz (AUT)
- 2018 – John Gimson & Anna Burnet (GBR)
- 2019 – Thomas Zajac & Barbara Matz (AUT)
- 2020 – Ruggero Tita & Caterina Banti (ITA)
- 2022 – Ruggero Tita & Caterina Banti (ITA)

=== Tornado ===
- 1987 – Christopher Cairns (AUS)
- 1988 – Paul Elvstrøm (DEN)
- 1989 – Giorgio Zuccoli (ITA)
- 1990 – Giorgio Zuccoli (ITA)
- 1991 – Andreas Hagara (AUT)
- 1992 – Lars Grael (BRA)
- 1993 – Clevenot & Quernec (FRA)
- 1994 – Roland Gäbler & Frank Parlow (GER)
- 1995 – Roman Hagara & Wolfgang Moser (AUT)
- 1996 – Roland Gäbler & Frank Parlow (GER)
- 1997 – Roland Gäbler & René Schwall (GER)
- 1998 – Fernando León Boissier & José Luis Ballester (ESP)
- 1999 – Darren Bundock & John Forbes (AUS)
- 2000 – Roman Hagara & Hans-Peter Steinacher (AUT)
- 2001 – Roman Hagara & Hans-Peter Steinacher (AUT)
- 2002 – Roman Hagara & Hans-Peter Steinacher (AUT)
- 2003 – John C. Lovell (USA)
- 2004 – Martin Strandberg & Kristian Mattson (SWE)
- 2005 – Roland Gäbler & Gunnar Struckmann (GER)
- 2006 – Darren Bundock & Glenn Ashby (AUS)
- 2007 – Johannes Polgar & Florian Spalteholz (GER)
- 2011 – Heiko Söhle & Thomas Noll (GER)

=== Men's Iqfoil ===
- 2021 – Sebastian Kördel (GER)
- 2022 – Ethan Westera (ARU)

=== Women's Iqfoil ===
- 2021 – Lena Erdil (GER)
- 2022 – Lena Erdil (GER)

=== Men's Mistral ===
- 1990 – Thomas Foyen (NOR)
- 1991 – Stephan van der Berg (NED)
- 1992 – Christoph Sieber (AUT)
- 1993 – Kai Hermeking (GER)
- 1994 – Kai Hermeking (GER)
- 1995 – Matthias Bornhäuser (GER)
- 1996 – Matthieu Koops (NED)
- 1997 – Amit Inbar (ISR)
- 1998 – Fredrik Palm (SWE)
- 1999 – Zhou Yuanguo (CHN)
- 2000 – Alexandre Guyader (FRA)
- 2001 – Nick Dempsey (GBR)
- 2002 – Przemysław Miarczyński (POL)
- 2003 – João Rodrigues (POR)
- 2004 – Maksym Oberemko (UKR)
- 2005 – Ho Chi Ho (CHN)

=== Women's Mistral ===
- 1990 – Natalie te Lievre (FRA)
- 1991 – Jorunn Horgen (NOR)
- 1992 – Jorunn Horgen (NOR)
- 1993 – Lee Lai-shan (HKG)
- 1994 – Mette Kjær (DEN)
- 1995 – Jorunn Horgen (NOR)
- 1996 – Jorunn Horgen (NOR)
- 1997 – Maud Herbert (FRA)
- 1998 – Lee Lai-shan (HKG)
- 1999 – Faustine Merret (FRA)
- 2000 – Jessica Crisp (ITA)
- 2001 – Lee Lai-shan (HKG)
- 2002 – Lee Lai-shan (HKG)
- 2003 – Lee Lai-shan (HKG)
- 2004 – Alessandra Sensini (ITA)
- 2005 – Chan Wai Kei (CHN)

=== Men's RS:X ===
- 2006 – Maksym Oberemko (UKR)
- 2007 – Maksymilian Wojcik (POL)
- 2008 – Piotr Myszka (POL)
- 2009 – Przemysław Miarczyński (POL)
- 2010 – Julien Bontemps (FRA)
- 2011 – Przemysław Miarczyński (POL)

=== Women's RS:X ===
- 2006 – Olha Maslivets (UKR)
- 2007 – Agata Brygoła (POL)
- 2008 – Romy Kinzl (GER)
- 2009 – Moana Delle (GER)
- 2010 – Agata Brygoła (POL)
- 2011 – Jessica Crisp (AUS)

== Notes ==
1. served as the Men's Laser Radial World Championship
2. served as the Musto Skiff World Championship
3. served as the Para European Sailing Championships
4. served as the OK European Championship
5. served as the Nordic Folkboat Gold Cup

== See also ==
- Cowes Week
- Royal Hobart Regatta
- Barcolana regatta
