= Roald Amundsen (ship) =

Brig built in 1952

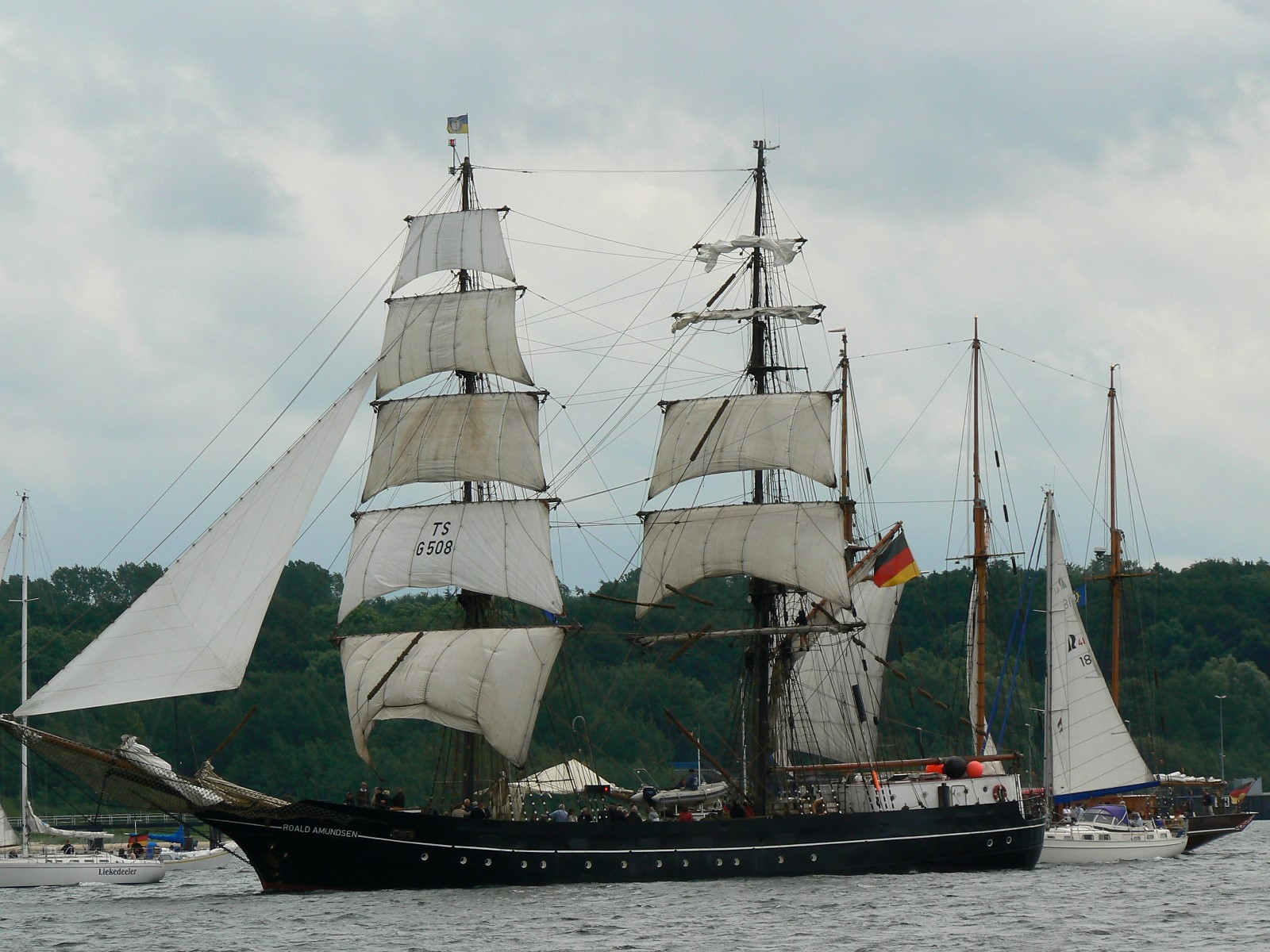
- Roald Amundsen at the Kiel Week 2007 (in front of the befriended schooner Amphitrite)

History

Germany
- Name: Vilm
- Operator: Lebenlernen auf Segelschiffen e.V.
- Launched: 1952
- Renamed: Roald Amundsen
- Refit: In 1992–1993 as a brig
- Home port: Eckernförde, Germany
- Identification: Call sign: DARG; MMSI number: 211215170; IMO number: 8994489

General characteristics
- Tonnage: 280 GRT
- Displacement: 480 t
- Length: 49.8 m (163 ft) oa; 38.2 m (125 ft) wl
- Beam: 7.2 m (24 ft)
- Draft: 4.2 m (14 ft) max
- Propulsion: 300 PS (221 kW) Buckau-Wolf
- Sail plan: brig (18 sails = 850 m^{2} (9,100 sq ft))
- Crew: 16 regular crew + 32 trainees

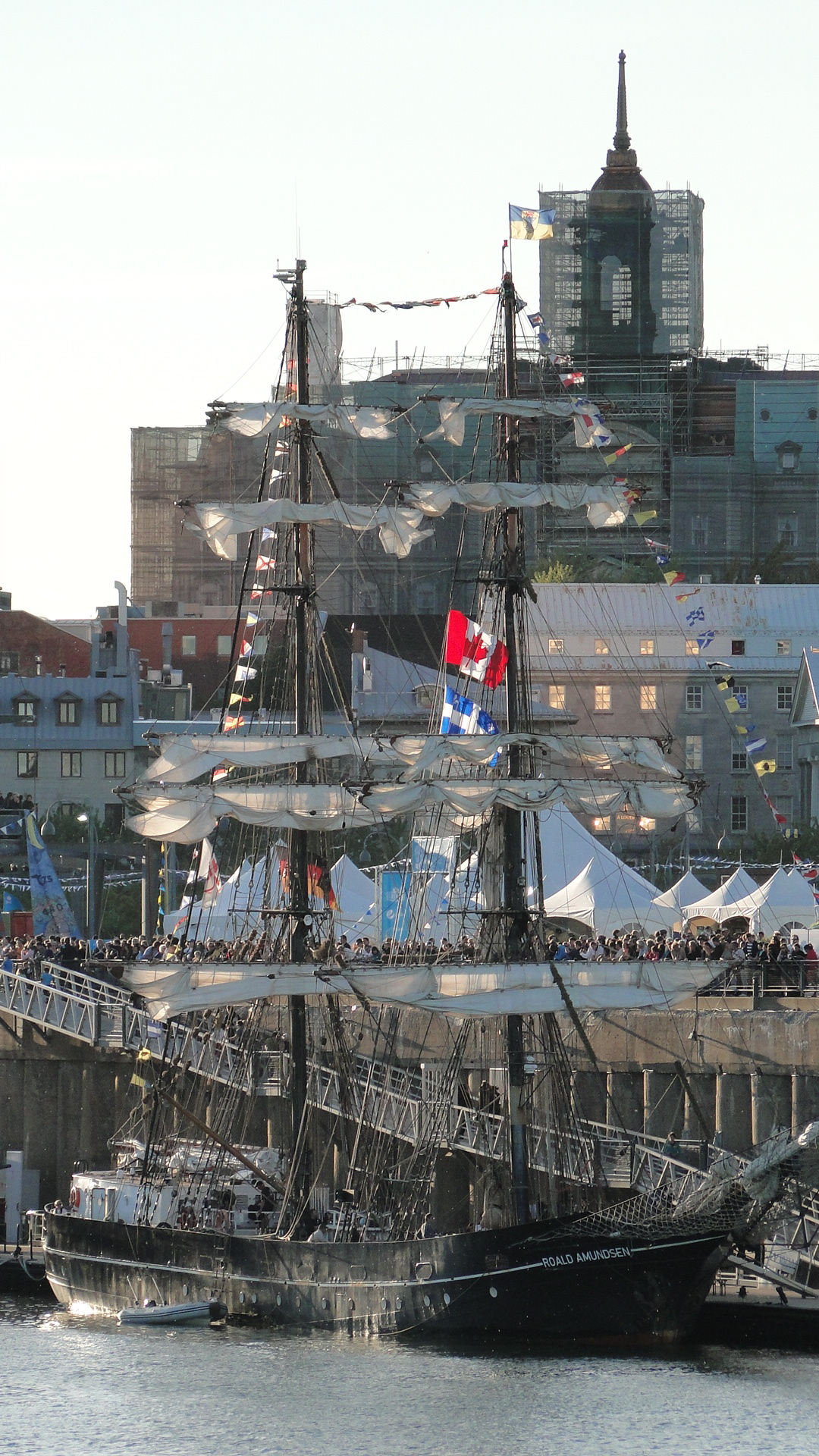
Roald Amundsen in Montreal, Canada, in 2010

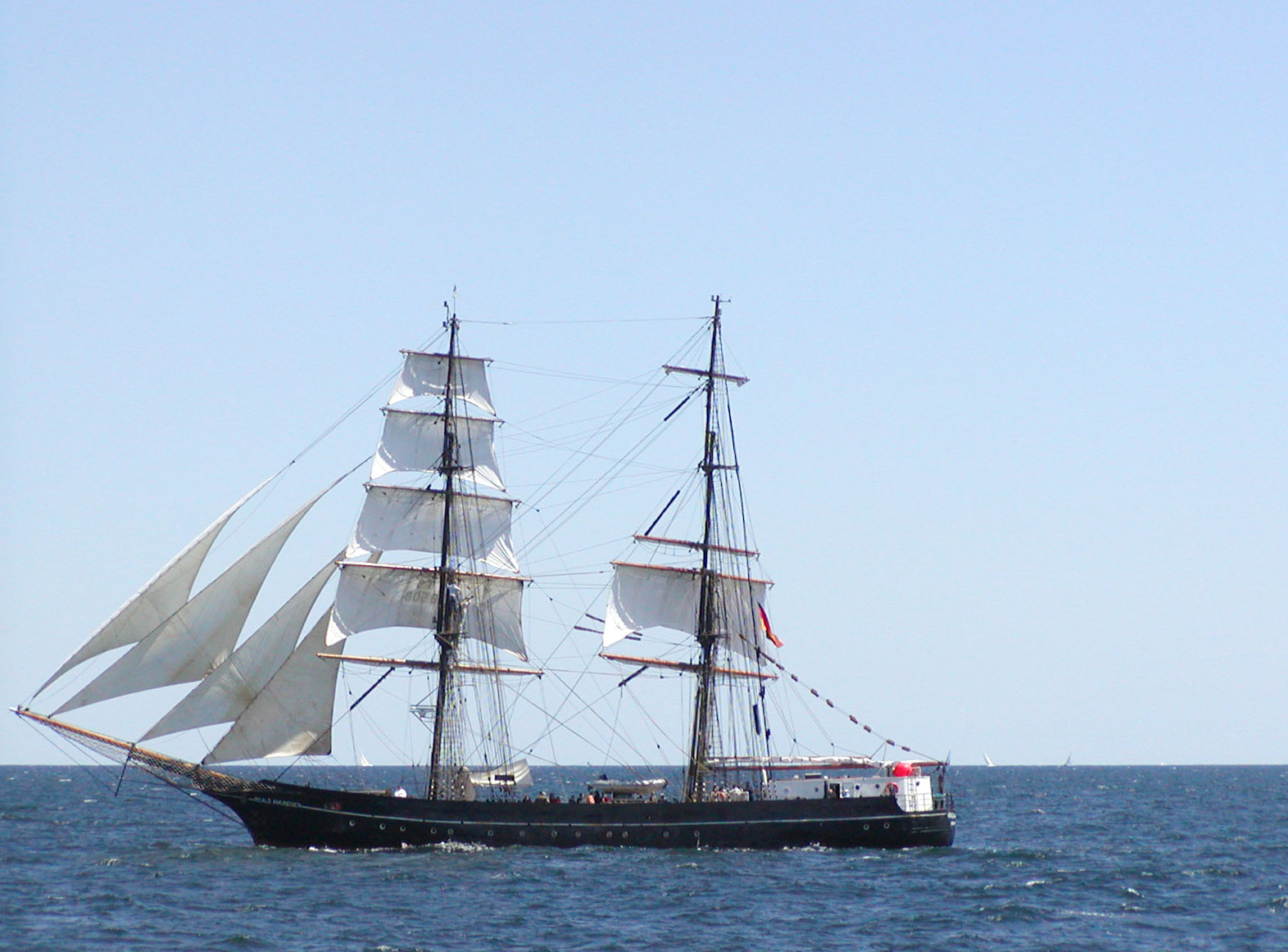
The yards of the upper main topsail, topgallant (missing at main mast) and royal are lifted when sails are set (left) and lowered otherwise (right) (Kiel Week 2008)

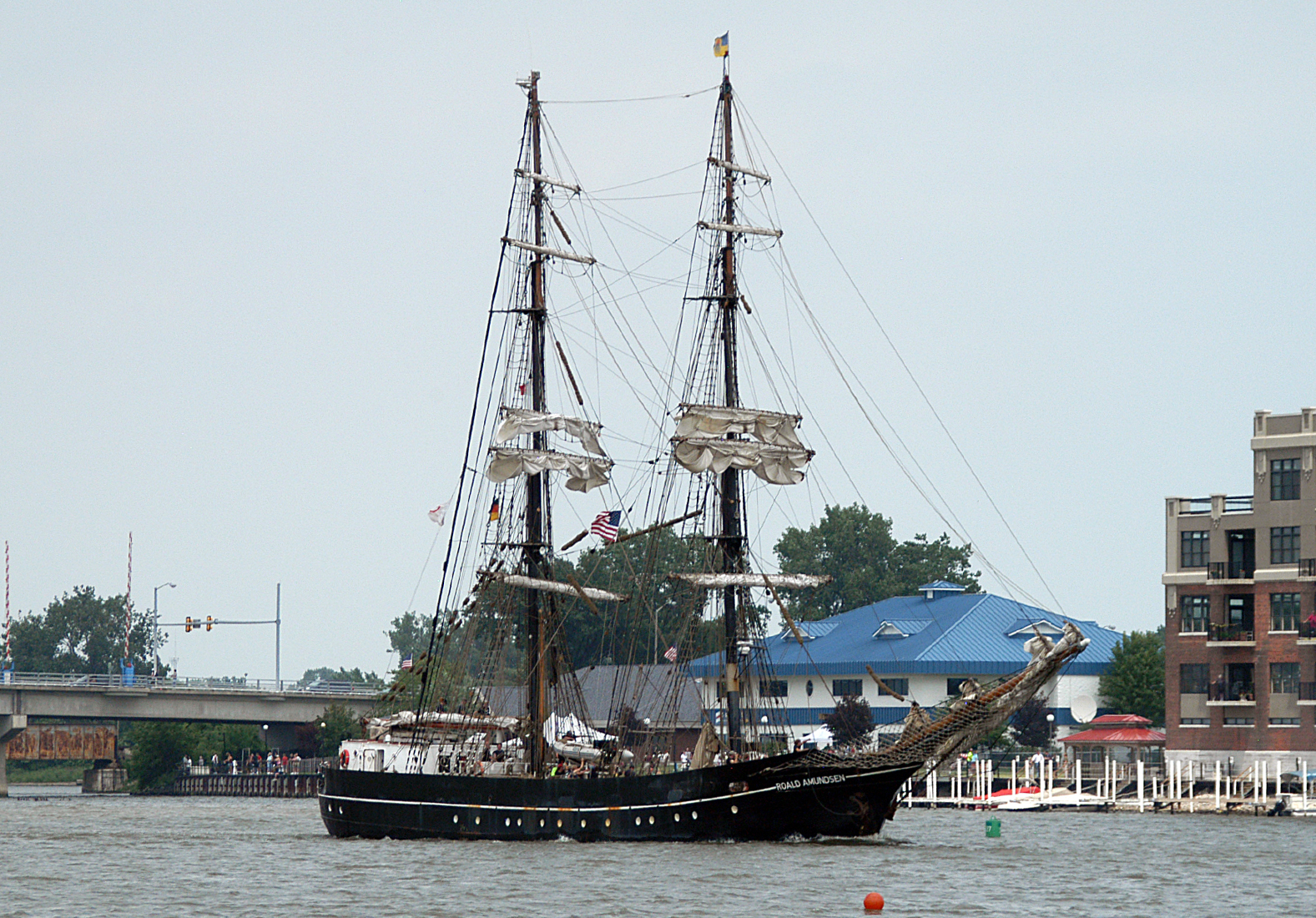
Roald Amundsen arriving in Bay City, Michigan in 2010

Roald Amundsen (often abbreviated Roald; named in honor of Norwegian polar explorer Roald Amundsen), originally named Vilm, is a German steel-ship built on the Elbe River in 1952. Having worked in different areas, she was refitted in 1992 to 1993 as a brig (two-masted square-rigged sailing ship) and now serves as a sail training ship. During summer, she usually operates in the Baltic Sea, and usually embarks for journeys to farther destinations for winter, including several trans-Atlantic crossings.

== Description ==
Roald Amundsen has a length overall of 49.8 m (163 ft), a length of hull of 40.8 m (134 ft) and a waterline length of 38.2 m (125 ft). The vessel has a beam of 7.2 m (24 ft) and a maximum draft of 4.2 m (14 ft). Roald's masts reach a height of 34 m (112 ft) and are rigged with 18 sails with a total area of 850.0 m^{2} (9,149 sq ft). The vessel has a displacement of 480 tons and has a tonnage of 298 gross register tons (GRT).

Roald Amundsen has an 8-cylinder Buckau-Wolff diesel engine rated at 220 kW (300 hp) named Emma. The vessel is equipped with two generators, one of 48 kW (64 hp), the other of 53 kW (71 hp). The ship can carry 180 tons of ballast. Roald Amundsen has crew of 17 with up to 31 trainees embarked.

== Ship history ==
The hull of the ship was built at the shipyard Roßlauer Werft on the Elbe River in Roßlau, German Democratic Republic, in 1952. Originally intended for fishing as a deep sea fishing lugger, plans were changed before the completion of the ship, and she was then instead built as a type of tanker. The vessel was completed at the shipyard Peene-Werft in Wolgast, Germany, on the Baltic Sea.

Named Vilm, the ship was put to use for the National People's Army (NVA), first as a tanker and supply vessel, operating out of Peenemünde and crewed mainly by civilian seamen. Converted to a transporter for bilge water in the 1970s on the Peene-Werft, Vilm then made regular trips to the bases of the National People's Army to take the ships' bilge water to a centralized treatment facility. This service was discontinued at the end of 1988.

After not having been used for a year, Vilm was towed to Neustadt in Holstein and there at the navy base used as living quarters. At the beginning of 1991, the ship was put up for sale by the Vebeg GmbH, a corporation to sell federal property.

Detlev Löll and Hanns Temme purchased the ship at an auction and, with the help of some of the former crew, sailed the ship to Wolgast in Mecklenburg-Vorpommern. In spring 1992, a complete overhaul began, in the course of which the ship received a new exterior keel and was refitted as a brig; the rig includes five square sails at each mast and includes lifting yards for the upper-three yards (upper main topsail, topgallant and royal) at each mast, lowering the center of gravity of the ship when sails are furled. The overhaul was subsidized by the state of Mecklenburg-Vorpommern and the Bundesagentur für Arbeit and formed part of the job creation program "Fridtjof Nansen" (led by the owner), which comprised the refitting of this ship as well as other sailing ships Fridtjof Nansen and Nobile.

In 1993, the ship was put to its new use under the name of Roald Amundsen. It was chartered by the newly founded sail training club LebenLernen auf Segelschiffen e.V. (short: LLaS; German: learning to live on sailing ships). After a short intermezzo with another sail-training club, Segelschiff Fritjof Nansen e.V., in 1993, Roald Amundsen has since been chartered by the LLaS and used for sail training.

Roald Amundsen now operates all year around as a sail training vessel with voyages lasting between one and three weeks. Her home port is Eckernförde, a harbour city in Schleswig-Holstein near Kiel in northern Germany. Summer months are spent with voyages on the Baltic Sea from Denmark to Baltic countries or the North Sea. Winters are spent in warmer regions. Roald Amundsen has repeatedly crossed the Atlantic Ocean, bound for South American ports in Brazil and French Guiana (1998), for tall ships events in North America (2000, 2010), and for the Caribbean (2001, 2011/12, 2012/13). Further destinations include Iceland (1995), England and Ireland (2006), the Mediterranean (2006/07, 2007/08), the Canary Islands (1995), and others. During her North American voyage in 2010, Roald Amundsen visited the Great Lakes and there met with the US brig Niagara; the two brigs formed an unofficial friendship, and as of 2013, Roald Amundsen still flies a flag of Niagara at some occasions such as the Tall Ship Parade at Kiel Week. Another friendship, based on their respective crews on board for Kiel Week, has been formed with the German wooden schooner Amphitrite; both ships have established a tradition of berthing next to each other during the event.

The ship has participated in the Tall Ships' Races and is rated as a Class A tall ship by Sail Training International.
