= Norddeutscher Regatta Verein =

Yacht club in Germany

Coordinates: 53°33′N 09°59′E

- Burgee
- Short name: NRV
- Founded: 1868
- Location: Schöne Aussicht 37; Hamburg, Germany
- Chairman: Andreas Christiansen
- Website: www.nrv.de (de) (en)

Norddeutscher Regatta Verein (NRV), approx. meaning "North German Regatta Club", is a yacht club in Germany. This club is based in Uhlenhorst, Hamburg, Germany; the clubhouse is located at Hamburg's Lake Außenalster. Founded in 1868, it is one of the oldest and largest yacht clubs in Germany, with some 2,000 members.

Norddeutscher Regatta Verein is one of the organizers of Kiel Week, together with the Yacht Club of Kiel, the Verein Seglerhaus am Wannsee and the Hamburger Sailing Club. Taking place in the Bay of Kiel, this annual event is one of the largest and most prestigious sailing regattas in the world. The NRV also assists the Yacht Club of Lübeck in the organization of the Travemünder Woche.

== History ==
The Norddeutscher Regatta Verein was established in 1868. Since that year it has taken part in many international yacht racing competitions.

In 2003 Norddeutscher Regatta Verein initiated a transatlantic regatta known as DaimlerChrysler North Atlantic Challenge (DCNAC) together with the New York Yacht Club. This event was staged to commemorate the 100th anniversary of the Hamburgischen Verein Seefahrt (HVS). In 2007 Norddeutscher Regatta Verein organized another transatlantic regatta, the HSH Nordbank blue race from Newport, Rhode Island to Cuxhaven.

The yacht club is one of the leading members of the International Council of Yacht Clubs, which was established in 2006.

== See also ==
- List of International Council of Yacht Clubs members
