= List of International Council of Yacht Clubs members =

This is a list of International Council of Yacht Clubs members.

Yacht club	City	Country	Founded
Annapolis Yacht Club	Annapolis	United States	1883
Bruxelles Royal Yacht Club	Brussels	Belgium	1906
Chicago Yacht Club	Chicago	United States	1826
Clube Naval de Cascais	Cascais	Portugal	1938
Eastern Yacht Club	Marblehead	United States	1870
Gstaad Yacht Club	Gstaad	Switzerland	
Long Beach Yacht Club, California	Long Beach	United States	1929
Newport Harbor Yacht Club	Newport Beach	United States	1916
Norddeutscher Regatta Verein	Hamburg	Germany	1868
Nyländska Jaktklubben	Helsinki	Finland	1861
Republic of Singapore Yacht Club	Singapore	Singapore	1826
Royal Canadian Yacht Club	Toronto	Canada	1866
Royal Cork Yacht Club	Cork	Ireland	1720
Royal Danish Yacht Club	Copenhagen	Denmark	1866
Royal Freshwater Bay Yacht Club	Perth	Australia	1896
Royal Hong Kong Yacht Club	Hong Kong	China	1890
Royal Malta Yacht Club	Ta' Xbiex	Malta	early 1800s
Royal Natal Yacht Club	Durban	South Africa	1858
Royal New Zealand Yacht Squadron	Auckland	New Zealand	1859
Royal Norwegian Yacht Club	Oslo	Norway	1883
Royal Perth Yacht Club	Perth	Australia	1841
Royal Queensland Yacht Squadron	Brisbane	Australia	1885
Royal Southern Yacht Club	Hamble-le-Rice	United Kingdom	1837
Royal Swedish Yacht Club	Stockholm	Sweden	1830
Royal Sydney Yacht Squadron	Sydney	Australia	1862
Royal Vancouver Yacht Club	Vancouver	Canada	1903
Royal Varuna Yacht Club	Pattaya	Thailand	1957
San Diego Yacht Club	San Diego	United States	1886
San Francisco Yacht Club	Belvedere	United States	1869
Sandringham Yacht Club	Melbourne	Australia	1903
Seattle Yacht Club	Seattle	United States	1892
Société Nautique de Marseille	Marseille	France	1887
Southern Yacht Club	New Orleans	United States	1849
St. Francis Yacht Club	San Francisco	United States	1927
Verein Seglerhaus am Wannsee	Berlin	Germany	1867
Yacht Club Italiano	Genoa	Italy	1879
