= Hamburger Segel-Club =

Yacht club in Hamburg, Germany

Coordinates: 53°33′N 09°59′E

Hamburger Segel-Club e.V.
- Burgee
- Short name: HSC
- Founded: 1927
- Location: An der Alster 47a Hamburg, Germany
- Website: website

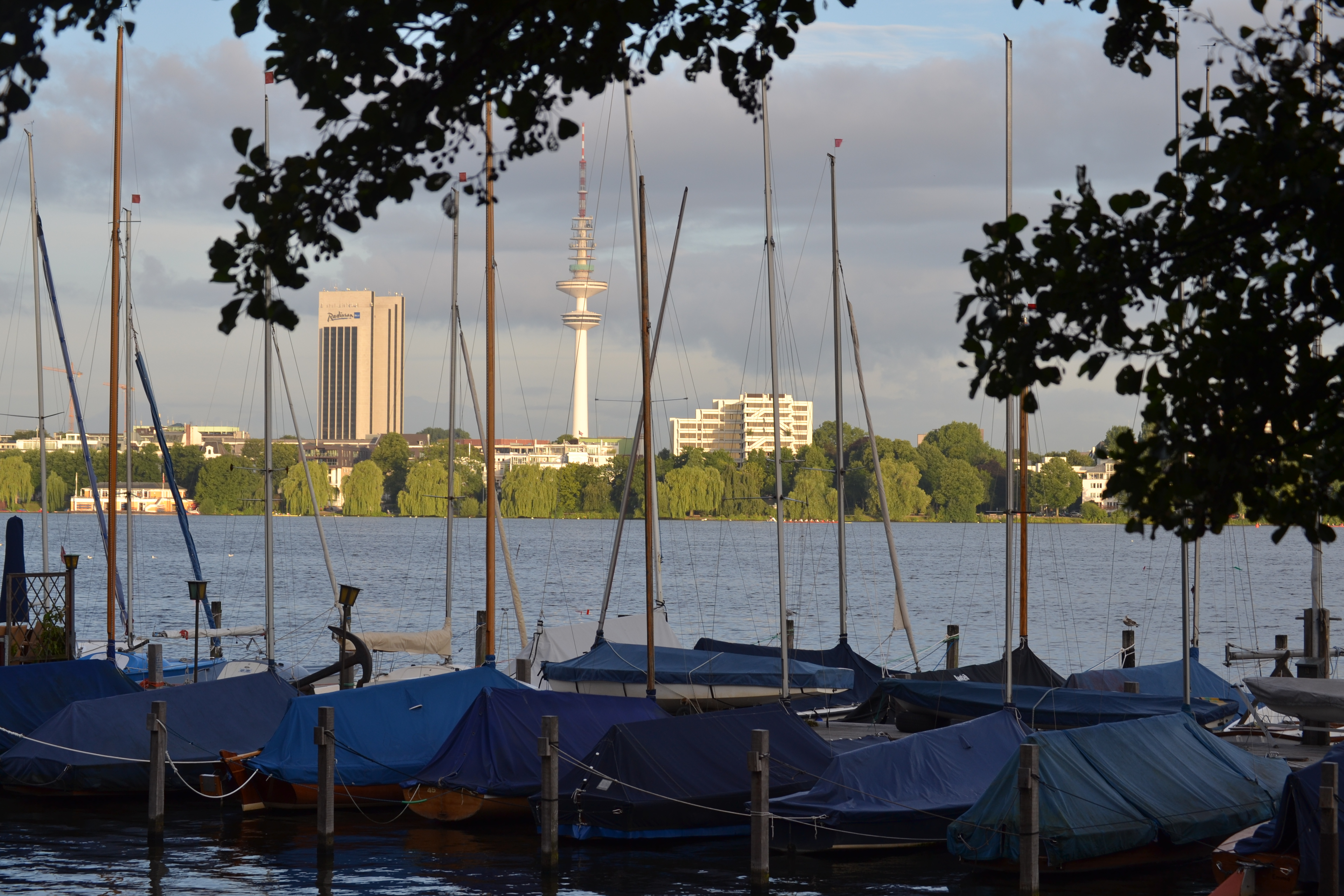
Inside Hamburger Segel-Club, view onto the Außenalster

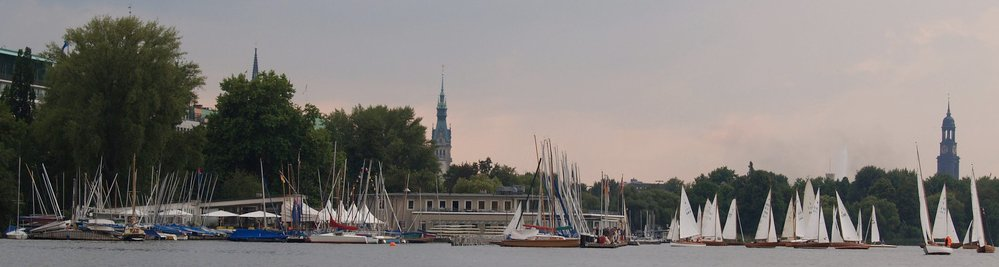
View of the Hamburger Sailing Club (HSC) right before the start of a regatta.

The Hamburger Segel-Club (Hamburg Sailing Club) (HSC), is one of the oldest and most active sailing clubs in Germany. The club is located by the shores of Lake Außenalster, in the heart of the Free and Hanseatic City of Hamburg.

HSC is one of the organizers of the Kiel Week together with the Yacht Club of Kiel, the Verein Seglerhaus am Wannsee and the Norddeutscher Regattaverein. Taking place in the Bay of Kiel, this annual event is one of the largest and most prestigious sailing regattas in the world. The HSC also assists the Yacht Club of Lübeck and the Norddeutscher Regattaverein in the organization of the Travemünder Woche.

== History ==
The predecessor of the present-day HSC was the Hamburger Yacht-Club, established in October 1892, out of which a group split in 1895. In 1926 this group merged with the Hamburger Segel-Verein. In 1927 it was registered as the Hamburger Segel-Club at the registry in Hamburg.

The founders of the original Hamburger Yacht-Club were yacht racing and cruising enthusiasts who joined the Deutscher Segler-Verband four weeks after establishing the club.

In 1925 the club organized the North Sea Week (Nordseewoche) sailing competition off Heligoland. In 1927 it helped to organize the Travemünder Woche for the first time and since 1928 the Kieler Woche (Kiel Week) as well.

Five years after having been established the club had 343 members and 87 boats; 46 competitions had been organized in which a total of 922 sailcraft took part. The best yachts of the club at the time were the Freya, the Ingeborg VIII and Otto Schümann's Carla IV.

Between 1934 and 1935, during Nazi times, all sailing clubs in Germany lost their autonomy and were arbitrarily joined to departments of the Deutscher Reichsbund für Leibesübungen (DRL), later renamed Nationalsozialistischer Reichsbund für Leibesübungen (NSRL), like the Wassersportverband (Watersports Association).

Since the NSRL, as a Nazi organization, was disbanded after Germany's defeat in World War II, the Hamburger Sailing Club had to be established anew, like other yacht clubs in West Germany at that time. Carl Georg Gewers led the club through the difficult postwar and rebuilding years. Among other achievements, he was able to convince the British occupation authorities to give back the seized sailing craft to the club.

In 1950 the Hamburger Sailing Club helped to organize the Kieler Woche (Kiel Week) again. After that the club was able to grow and expand until today.

== See also ==
- Norddeutscher Regattaverein
