= Verein Seglerhaus am Wannsee =

Yacht club of Berlin, Germany

Coordinates: 52°26′N 13°09′E

Verein Seglerhaus am Wannsee (VSaW)
- Burgee of Verein Seglerhaus am Wannsee
- Formation: 1867 Havel
- Legal status: active
- Purpose: advocate and public voice, educator and network for Recreational boating, and competitive sailors, coaches, volunteers and events
- Location: Berlin, Germany
- Official language: English, German
- Website: vsaw.de

The Verein Seglerhaus am Wannsee (VSaW) (meaning: "Sailing house by the Wann Lake Union") is the second oldest yacht club in Germany after Segelclub RHE. It is located on the shores of the Greater Wannsee lake, southwest of Berlin.

The club has mooring space for 250 yachts. It organizes yearly regatta series with both domestic and international participation.

Together with the Yacht Club of Kiel, the Norddeutscher Regattaverein and the Hamburger Sailing Club, the Verein Seglerhaus am Wannsee organizes the Kiel Week. Taking place in the Bay of Kiel, this annual event is one of the largest and most prestigious sailing regattas in the world.

Members of the Verein Seglerhaus am Wannsee have won Olympic, World and European competitions. The Olympic section of the club consists of six teams.

== History ==
The club was established in October 1867 on a small wooden shack by river Havel with fourteen members and eight boats. In 1877 it moved to its present location at the edge of the Wannsee lake. The first club house was built in 1881.

Soon this yacht club acquired prestige and even German Crown Prince William sailed his yacht on the lake. A larger, roomier club house in Tudor style was built in 1910. This building is now a protected monument.

The Verein Seglerhaus am Wannsee is one of the main members of the International Council of Yacht Clubs.

== See also ==
- List of International Council of Yacht Clubs members
