= Alicia Kinoshita =

Japanese sailor (born 1967)

Personal information
- Full name: Yurie Alicia Kinoshita
- Born: 4 February 1967 (age 59) Copenhagen, Denmark

Sailing career
- Sport: Sailing
Medal record
Sailing
Representing Japan
Olympic Games
Silver medal – second place	1996 Atlanta	470 class

Yurie Alicia Kinoshita (Japanese: 木下 ユリエ アリーシア; born 4 February 1967 in Copenhagen, Denmark) is a Japanese sailor. Her mother is Danish, and her father is Japanese. She won a silver medal in the 470 class at the 1996 Summer Olympics with Yumiko Shige.
