= Lena Erdil =

Turkish windsurfer

Personal information
- Full name: Lena Aylin Erdil
- Nickname: "Rüzgarın Kızı" (Daughter of the Wind)
- Nationality: Turkish, German
- Born: 28 February 1989 (age 37) İzmir, Turkey
- Education: Political science, Philosophy; University of Sussex
- Height: 1.64 m (5 ft 5 in)

Sport
- Country: Turkey
- Sport: Sailing
- Event: Windsurfing
- Team: Red Bull

Lena Aylin Erdil (born 28 February 1989) is a professional windsurfer from İzmir, Turkey. She is competing in the PWA World Tour mostly in the slalom event. She is currently sponsored by NRV, Starboard Windsurfing, Point7, Salzbrenner Würstchen and FGH.

== Personal life ==
Lena Aylin Erdil was born to a Turkish father and a German mother in İzmir, Turkey on 28 February 1989. When she was two years old, the family moved to Göttingen, Germany, and at the age of ten, she moved with her parents to Brussels, Belgium. Her father Güven Erdil is a professor of sports coaching serving as the Head of Sports Department at Marmara University's Faculty of Sports. Her mother Ellen was a primary school teacher of German language, and sports, who died from colorectal cancer at the age of 55 in 2016. Her father and mother had met each other while windsurfing. She spent her childhood years in Germany and Belgium. During summer holidays, she visited Çeşme, İzmir Province for windsurfing.

After completing high school, she received an athletic grant from the University of Sussex in Brighton, England, in 2009, where she majored in political science and philosophy.

Following graduation, she returned to Turkey at the age of 24, and settled in Bodrum, Muğla Province, in the southwestern Aegean Region. In 2007, Erdil opened her own sports school, "Lena Erdil Windsurf Center", in the Ortakent neighborhood of Bodrum with the support of her parents. She hosts pro-X-training activities at her sports center.

In 2019, Erdil moved to Germany to settle in Hamburg.

== Sports career ==
Erdil used to perform windsurfing in her youth with her parents during the summer holidays in Turkey. She received her first windsurfing board and gear at the age of 13 from her father.

The 1.64 m (5 ft 4 1/2 in)-tall sportswoman performs windsurfing professionally, competing in the freestyle, wave, and jump events in addition to her main class of slalom. Although the slalom branch is not an Olympic discipline, she prefers it due to its high speed in racing. She also competes on teams. To remain fit for competitions, she exercises three to six hours a day in the summer months, and in the winter time, she goes to Cape Town, South Africa, for three months.

She debuted in competitive windsurfing at the age of 15. In 2005, Erdil won the junior champion title in the Turkish championship. After being successful in local races, she took part in Turkish championships, and then debuted internationally in 2006. She placed fourth at the 2008 PWA World Tour held in Alaçatı, Turkey, marking her first best international ranking. In 2012, Erdil took third place in the overall standings at the PWA World Cup after being runner-up in the Italian leg at Reggio Calabria. She improved her rank in the PWA World Cup's overall classification by placing second in 2014.

At the 2015 International Funboard Class Association (IFCA) Slalom World Championship held in Sylt, Germany, she gained her first championship title, and the next year at the same competition in Brač, Croatia, she defended her title. Also in 2016, she was the winner of the PWA World Cup's South Korean leg at Ulsan. As of 2016, she held eight championship titles in the Turkish Women's Slalom Championships. In the following competitions, she secured third or second place in almost every competition. In 2018, she finished the PWA World Cup season as the runner-up in the slalom event after placing second in the legs in Ulsan, South Korea, and Yokosuka, Japan, as well as ranking third in Viana do Castelo, Portugal.

She is the holder of the Turkish windsurfing record with 45.74 knots (84.71 km/h) set during the 2012 International Windsurf Speed Record competition held in Lüderitz, Namibia. This is the second-best world record for women at all.

One of Erdil's main sponsors is Red Bull since 2011. She is nicknamed "Rüzgarin Kızı" (Daughter of the Wind) in her country.

== Achievements ==
Year	Competition	Place	Rank	Ref
Overall
2019	PWA World Cup		4th	
2018	PWA World Cup		2nd place, silver medalist(s)	
2017	PWA World Cup		4th	
2016	PWA World Cup		2nd place, silver medalist(s)	
2015	PWA World Cup		3rd place, bronze medalist(s)	
2015	Dream Cup		3rd place, bronze medalist(s)	
2014	PWA Indoor World Cup		2nd place, silver medalist(s)	
2013	PWA World Cup		7th	
2012	PWA World Cup		3rd place, bronze medalist(s)	
2011	PWA World Cup		6th	
2010	PWA World Cup		9th	
2009	PWA World Cup		6th	
2008	PWA World Cup		7th	
Slalom
2018	PWA World Cup	South Korea, Ulsan	2nd place, silver medalist(s)	
2018	PWA World Cup	Japan, Yokosuka	2nd place, silver medalist(s)	
2018	PWA World Cup	Portugal, Viana do Castelo	3rd place, bronze medalist(s)	
2017	PWA World Cup	South Korea, Ulsan	2nd place, silver medalist(s)	
2017	PWA World Cup	Japan, Yokosuka	3rd place, bronze medalist(s)	
2017	PWA World Cup	Denmark, Hvide Sande	4th	
2016	PWA World Cup	South Korea, Ulsan	1st place, gold medalist(s)	
2016	PWA World Cup	Denmark, Hvide Sande	3rd place, bronze medalist(s)	
2016	NoveNove Aloha Classic	United States, Hawaii, Maui	13th	
2016	IFCA Slalom World Championship	Croatia, Brač	1st place, gold medalist(s)	
2015	PWA World Cup	South Korea, Ulsan	2nd place, silver medalist(s)	
2015	PWA World Cup	Turkey, Alaçatı	6th	
2015	Dream Cup	France, New Caledonia, Nouméa	3rd place, bronze medalist(s)	
2015	IFCA Slalom World Championship	Germany, Sylt	1st place, gold medalist(s)	
2014	PWA World Cup	Turkmenistan, Awaza	3rd place, bronze medalist(s)	
2014	PWA World Cup	Turkey, Alaçatı	3rd place, bronze medalist(s)	
2014	PWA World Cup	France, New Caledonia, Nouméa	2nd place, silver medalist(s)	
2014	PWA Indoor World Cup	Poland, Warsaw	2nd place, silver medalist(s)	
2013	PWA World Cup	South Korea, Ulsan	7th	
2013	PWA World Cup	Turkey, Alaçatı	7th	
2012	PWA World Cup	Italy, Reggio Calabria	2nd place, silver medalist(s)	
2012	PWA World Cup	South Korea, Ulsan	8th	
2012	PWA World Cup	Turkey, Alaçatı	4th	
2011	PWA World Cup	Vietnam, Mũi Né	5th	
2011	PWA World Cup	South Korea, Ulsan	9th	
2011	PWA World Cup	Aruba, Aruba	7th	
2011	PWA World Cup	Turkey, Alaçatı	4th	
2010	PWA World Cup	South Korea, Ulsan	6th	
2010	PWA World Cup	Spain, Costa Brava	8th	
2010	PWA World Cup	Turkey, Alaçatı	12th	
2010	PWA World Cup	France, Hyères	0	
2009	PWA World Cup	[South Korea, Ulsan	5th	
2009	PWA World Cup	Spain, Costa Brava	9th	
2009	PWA World Cup	Turkey, Alaçatı	9th	
2008	PWA World Championship	Spain, Costa Brava	9th	
2008	PWA World Championship	Spain, Fuerteventura	13th	
2008	PWA World Championship	Turkey, Alaçatı	4th	
Freestyle
2018	PWA World Cup	Portugal, Viana do Castelo	6th	
Wave
2017	PWA World Cup	Germany, Sylt	7th	
Jump
2015	Dream Cup	France, New Caledonia, Nouméa	4th	
