= Wolfgang Hunger =

German sailor (born 1960)

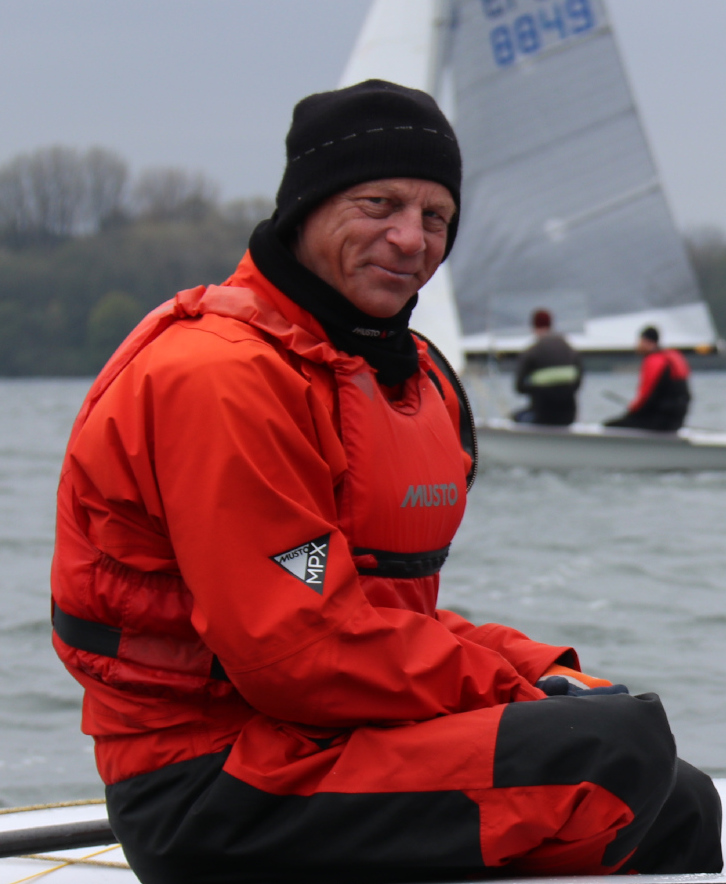

Personal information
- Nationality: German
- Born: 19 July 1960 (age 65) Kiel, Germany

Sport
- Sport: Sailing

Wolfgang Hunger (German pronunciation: [ˈvɔlfɡaŋ ˈhʊŋɐ], audio; born 19 July 1960) is a German sailor. He competed at the 1984 Summer Olympics, the 1988 Summer Olympics, and the 1992 Summer Olympics.
