= Tine Moberg-Parker =

Canadian sailor

Personal information
- Nationality: Canadian
- Born: 4 June 1969 (age 57) Oslo, Norway

Sport
- Sport: Sailing

Tine Moberg-Parker (born 4 June 1969) is a Canadian sailor. She competed in the Europe event at the 1996 Summer Olympics, finishing in 13th place.
