= Stefan Warkalla =

German sailor

Personal information
- Nationality: German
- Born: 22 August 1964 (age 60); Dortmund, West Germany

Sport
- Sport: Sailing

Stefan Warkalla (born 22 August 1964) is a German sailor. He competed in the Laser event at the 1996 Summer Olympics.
