= Yumiko Shige =

Japanese sailor (1965–2018)

Medal record

Sailing

Representing Japan

Olympic Games
Silver medal – second place	1996 Atlanta	470 class

Yumiko Shige (重 由美子, Shige Yumiko; 4 August 1965 – 9 December 2018, both in Karatsu, Saga Prefecture) was a Japanese sailor. She won a silver medal in the 470 class at the 1996 Summer Olympics with Alicia Kinoshita. Shige instructed other sailors in a yacht harbour local to her residence.

Shige died of breast cancer on 9 December 2018 at the age of 53.
