= Gabriele Bruni =

Italian sailor

Personal information
- Nationality: Italian
- Born: 2 May 1974 (age 50); Palermo, Italy

Sport
- Sport: Sailing

Gabriele Bruni (born 2 May 1974) is an Italian sailor. He competed in the 49er event at the 2000 Summer Olympics.
