= Tobias Schadewaldt =

German sailor

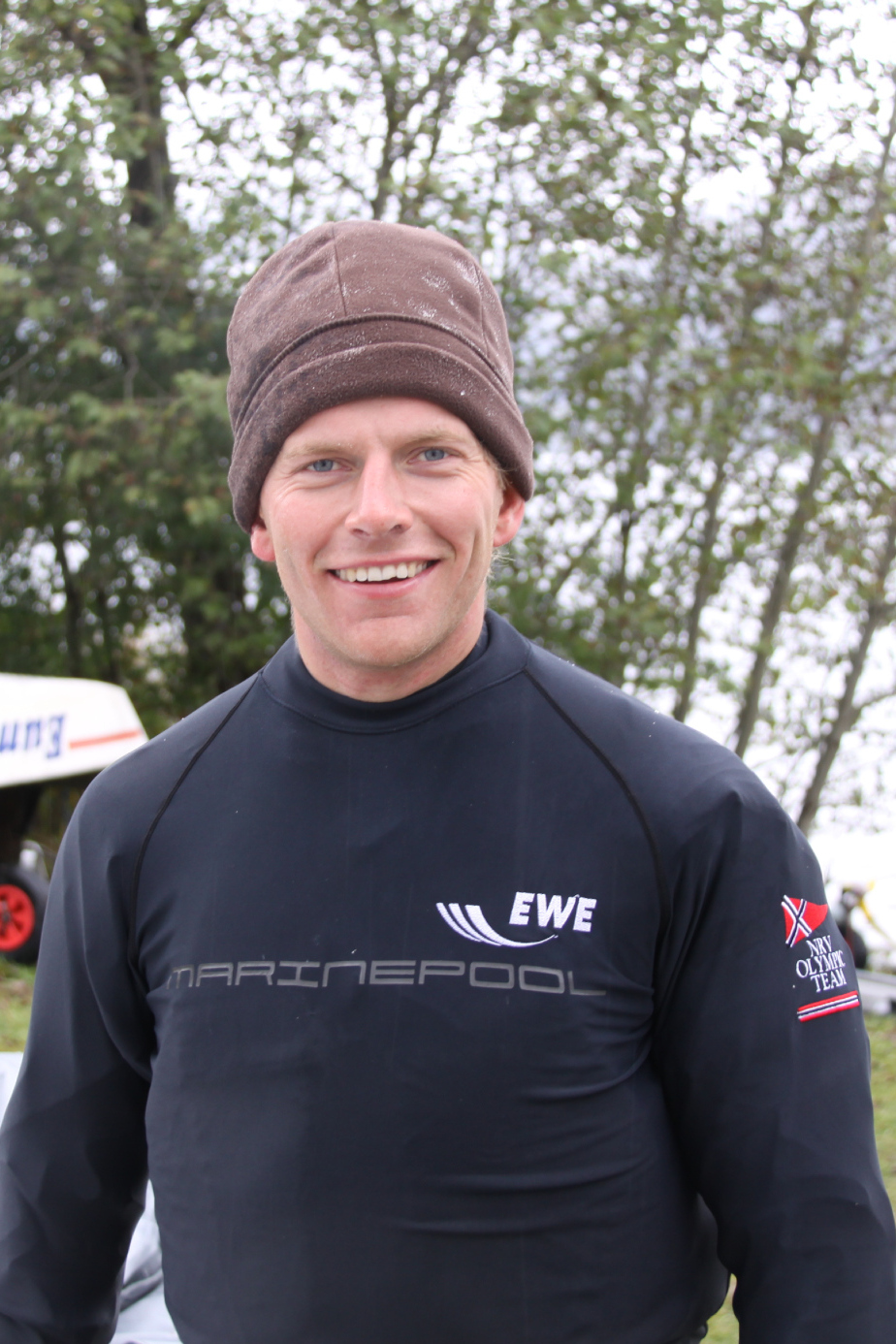
Tobias Schadewald DM Laser 2009

Tobias Schadewaldt (born 20 September 1984 in Wilhelmshaven) is a German sailor. He competed at the 2012 Summer Olympics in the 49er class.
