= Fiona Galloway =

New Zealand sailor (born 1966)

Personal information
- Born: 18 October 1966 (age 59) Levin, Manawatū-Whanganui, New Zealand

Sport
- Country: New Zealand
- Sport: Sailing

Fiona Patricia Galloway (born 18 October 1966) is a former New Zealand female sailor. She competed at the 1988 Summer Olympics in the sailing event.
