= Carolina Werner =

German sailor

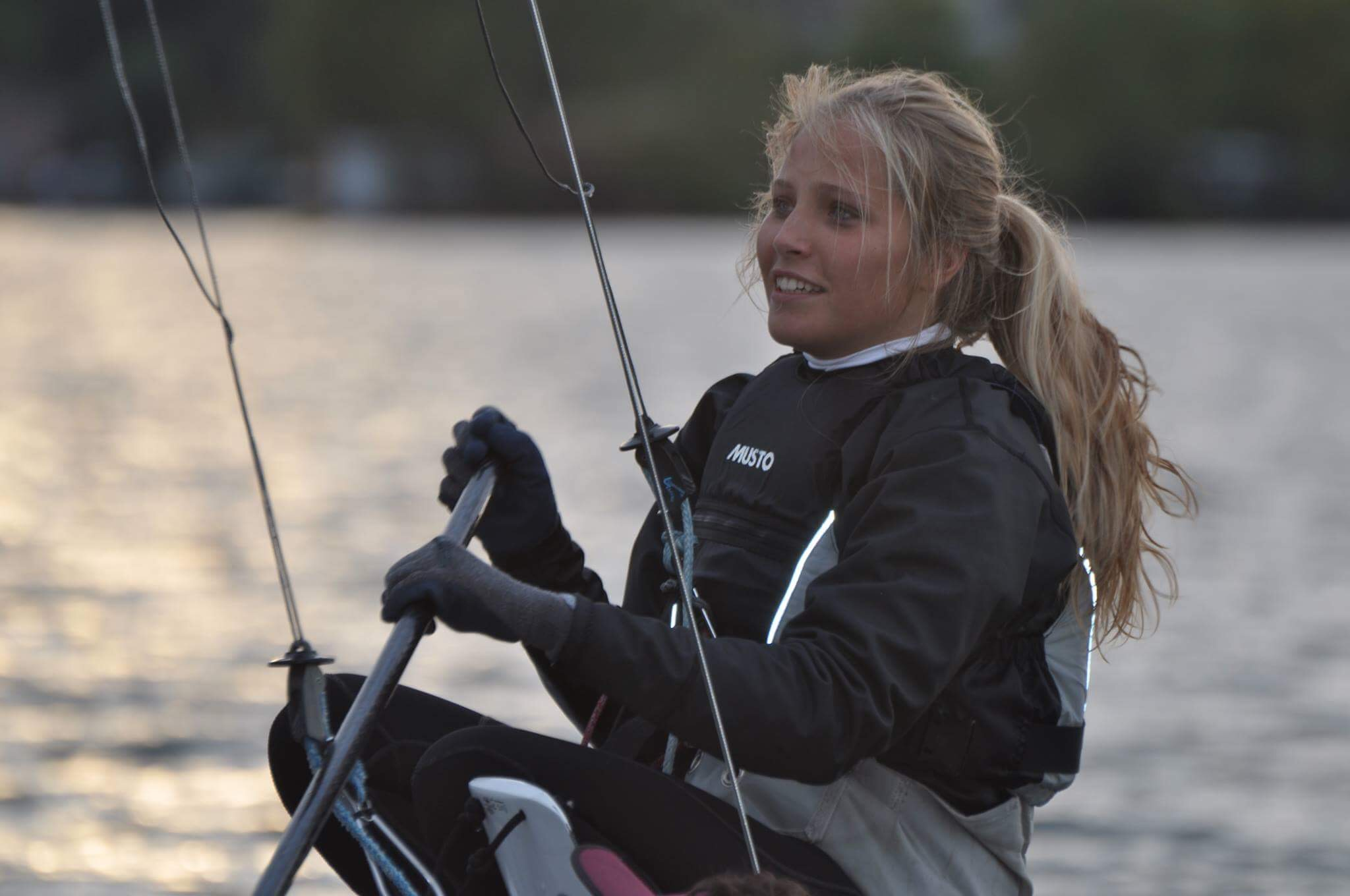

Personal information
- Nationality: German
- Born: 2 March 1994 (age 32)
- Height: 1.68 m (5 ft 6 in)
- Weight: 58 kg (128 lb)

Sailing career
- Sport: Sailing
- Class: Nacra 17

Carolina Werner (born 2 March 1994) is a German sailor. She represented Germany, along with partner Paul Kohlhoff, in the Nacra 17 class at the 2016 Summer Olympics in Rio de Janeiro. They finished in 13th place.
