= 470 World Championships =

International sailing competition

The 470 World Championships have been held every year since 1970 and organised by the club on behalf of the International 470 Class Association and recognized by World Sailing. When the Championship forms part of the ISAF Sailing World Championships. The class also holds the 470 Junior World Championships and the 470 Masters World Championships. club The 470 is a sailboat class used as equipment for the Olympic Sailing Competition.

The boat has been used in additional World Championships organized by World Sailing notabily the Youth Sailing World Championships and the IYRU Women's Sailing World Championships.

== Editions ==
Event			Host			Sailors			Boat					Ref.
Ed.	Dates	Year	Host club	Location	Country	Ath.	Nat.	Cont.	Gender	M	F	M/F	F/M	Ref.
1	12–19 July	1970		Lacanau	France	102	14		Open					
2	28 July – 5 August	1971		Ostend	Belgium	118	13		Open					
3	4–14 August	1972		Montreal	Canada	106	13		Open					
4	8–17 August	1973		Kiel	West Germany	156	19		Open					
5	3–11 August	1974		Naples	Italy	158	29		Open					
6	7–15 July	1975		New York	United States	148	20		Open					
7	16–26 September	1977		Shizuoka	Japan	90	16		Open					
8	28 July – 4 August	1978		Marstrand	Sweden	116	27		Open					
9	10–16 August	1979		Medemblik	Netherlands	148	30		Open					
10	6–15 February	1980		Porto Alegre	Brazil	98	16		Open					
11	29 August – 6 Sept.	1981		Quiberon	France	154	27		Open					
12	3–12 July	1982		Cascais	Portugal	170	24		Open					
13	2–10 June	1983		Weymouth	United Kingdom	148	21		Open					
14	25 January – 3 February	1984		Auckland	New Zealand	122	15		Open					
15	23 August – 8 September	1985		Marina di Carrara	Italy				Male/Mixed					
15	23 August – 8 September	1985		Marina di Carrara	Italy				Female					
16	21–29 September	1986		Salou	Spain				Male/Mixed					
16	21–29 September	1986		Salou	Spain				Female					
17	20 June – 5 July	1987		Kiel	West Germany				Male/Mixed					
17	20 June – 5 July	1987		Kiel	West Germany				Female					
18	27 March – 6 April	1988		Haifa	Israel				Male/Mixed					
18	27 March – 6 April	1988		Haifa	Israel				Female					
19	10–21 August	1989		Tsu	Japan				Male/Mixed					
19	10–21 August	1989		Tsu	Japan				Female					
20	16–26 August	1990		Medemblik	Netherlands				Male/Mix					
20	16–26 August	1990		Medemblik	Netherlands				Female					
21	11–21 December	1991		Brisbane	Australia				Male/Mixed					
21	11–21 December	1991		Brisbane	Australia				Female					
22	24–29 April	1992		Cádiz	Spain				Male/Mixed					
22	24–29 April	1992		Cádiz	Spain				Female					
23	18–24 July	1993		Crozon-Morgat	France				Male/Mixed					
23	18–24 July	1993		Crozon-Morgat	France				Female					
24	16–25 August	1994		Helsinki	Finland				Male/Mixed					
24	16–25 August	1994		Helsinki	Finland				Female					
25	10–20 August	1995		Toronto	Canada				Male/Mixed					
25	10–20 August	1995		Toronto	Canada				Female					
26	8–17 February	1996		Porto Alegre	Brazil				Male/Mixed					
26	8–17 February	1996		Porto Alegre	Brazil				Female					
27	21–30 August	1997		Tel Aviv	Israel				Male/Mixed					
27	21–30 August	1997		Tel Aviv	Israel				Female					
28	31 August – 9 September	1998	Club Nautic S’Arenal	Bay of Palma, Mallorca, Balearics	Spain				Male/Mixed					
28	31 August – 9 September	1998	Club Nautic S’Arenal	Bay of Palma, Mallorca, Balearics	Spain				Female					
29	7–17 Jan	1999	Black Rock Yacht Club, Australia	Black Rock, Victoria	Australia	188	31	5	Male/Mix	94	-	0	0	
29	7–17 Jan	1999	Black Rock Yacht Club, Australia	Black Rock, Victoria	Australia	114	25	5	Female	-	57	-	-	
30	10–20 May	2000		Balatonfüred	Hungary	224	42	5	Male/Mix	112	-	0	0	
30	10–20 May	2000		Balatonfüred	Hungary	106	29	5	Female	-	53	-	-	
31	8-17 Sep	2001	Sailing Club Jadro Koper	Koper	Slovenia	210	33	5	Male/Mix	105	-	0	0	
31	8-17 Sep	2001	Sailing Club Jadro Koper	Koper	Slovenia	94	23	5	Female	-	47	-	-	
32	2–11 Sept	2002		Cagliari	Italy	214	31	5	Male/Mix	107	-	0	0	
32	2–11 Sept	2002		Cagliari	Italy	122	27	5	Female	-	61	-	-	
33	11–24 Sept	2003		Cádiz	Spain				Male					
33	11–24 Sept	2003		Cádiz	Spain				Female					
34	7–16 May	2004		Zadar	Croatia				Male/Mixed					
34	7–16 May	2004		Zadar	Croatia				Female					
35	19–28 August	2005		San Francisco	United States				Male/Mixed					
35	19–28 August	2005		San Francisco	United States				Female					
36	4–13 September	2006		Rizhao	China				Male/Mixed					
36	4–13 September	2006		Rizhao	China				Female					
37	28 June – 13 July	2007	Clube Naval de Cascais	Cascais	Portugal				Male					
37	28 June – 13 July	2007	Clube Naval de Cascais	Cascais	Portugal				Female					
38	21–30 January	2008		Melbourne	Australia				Male/Mixed					
38	21–30 January	2008		Melbourne	Australia				Female					
39	20–29 August	2009		Rungsted	Denmark				Male/Mixed					
39	20–29 August	2009		Rungsted	Denmark				Female					
40	9–18 July	2010		The Hague	Netherlands				Male/Mixed					
40	9–18 July	2010		The Hague	Netherlands				Female					
41	3–18 December	2011		Perth	Australia				Male					
41	3–18 December	2011		Perth	Australia				Female					
42	10–19 May	2012	Barcelona International Sailing Centre	Barcelona	Spain				Male/Mixed					
42	10–19 May	2012	Barcelona International Sailing Centre	Barcelona	Spain				Female					
43	30 July – 10 August	2013		La Rochelle	France				Male/Mixed					
43	30 July – 10 August	2013		La Rochelle	France				Female					
44	12–21 September	2014		Santander	Spain				Male/Mixed					
44	12–21 September	2014		Santander	Spain				Female					
45	10–17 October	2015	Haifa Sailing Center	Haifa	Israel	118	31	6	Male	59	-	-	-	
45	10–17 October	2015	Haifa Sailing Center	Haifa	Israel	84	22	5	Female	-	42	-	-	
46	-	2016	Club Náutico San Isidro	San Isidro, Buenos Aires	Argentina	84	23	6	Male	42	-	-	-	
46	-	2016	Club Náutico San Isidro	San Isidro, Buenos Aires	Argentina	78	22	5	Female	-	39	-	-	
47	7–15 July	2017	Nautical Club of Thessaloniki	Thessaloniki	Greece	144	30	6	Male	72	-	-	-	
47	7–15 July	2017	Nautical Club of Thessaloniki	Thessaloniki	Greece	120	25	6	Female	-	60	-	-	
48	30 July – 12 August	2018		Aarhus	Denmark	128	29	5	Male	64	-	-	-	
48	30 July – 12 August	2018		Aarhus	Denmark	94	25	6	Female	-	47	-	-	
49	4–9 August	2019		Enoshima	Japan	104	25	5	Male	52	-	-	-	
49	4–9 August	2019		Enoshima	Japan	78	24	5	Female	-	39	-	-	
N/A	13–21 March	2020	Club Nautic S'Arenal	Bay of Palma, Mallorca, Balearics	Spain	Cancelled due to COVID-19								
50	8–13 March	2021		Vilamoura	Portugal	58	19	5	Male	29	-	-	-	
50	8–13 March	2021		Vilamoura	Portugal	54	18	3	Female	-	27	-	-	
50	8–13 March	2021		Vilamoura	Portugal	40	9	3	Mixed	-	-	8	12	
52	21–29 October	2022	Sdot Yam Sailing Club	Sdot Yam	Israel	120	20	5	Mixed	-	-	31	29	
52	8–20 August	2023		The Hague	Netherlands	128	28	5	Mixed	-	-	27	37	
55	24 Feb – 3 Mar	2024	Club Nautic S'Arenal	Bay of Palma, Mallorca, Balearics	Spain	122	26	6	Mixed	-	-	31	30	
56	6–14 June	2025		Gdynia	Poland	96	19	3	Mixed	-	-	18	30	
57	12–17 August	2026	Enoshima Yacht Harbor	Enoshima	Japan	74	28	5	Mixed	-	-	33	28	

== Multiple medallists ==
Ranking	Sailor	Gold	Silver	Bronze	Total	No. Entries	Ref.
1	Mathew Belcher (AUS)	8	0	1	9	19	
2	Malcolm Page (AUS)	6	2	1	9	15	
3	Lobke Berkhout (NED)	5	1	1	7	14	
4	Will Ryan (AUS)	5	0	1	6	8	
5	Sofia Bekatorou (GRE)	4	0	0	4	8	
5	Emilia Tsoulfa (GRE)	4	0	0	4	9	
7	Nathan Wilmot (AUS)	3	2	1	6	10	
8	Yelena Pacholzhik (UKR)	3	2	0	5	5	
9	Ruslana Taran (UKR)	3	1	0	4	8	
9	Theresa Zabell (ESP)	3	1	0	4	8	
11	David Barnes (NZL)	3	0	1	4	4	
11	Hamish Willcox (NZL)	3	0	1	4	4	
13	Marcelien Bos-Dekoning (NED)	3	0	0	3	8	
13	David Ullman (USA)	3	0	0	3	10	
13	Tom Linskey (USA)	3	0	0	3	5	
16	Hannah Mills (GBR)	2	3	2	7	13	
16	Jordi Xammar Hernandez (ESP)	2	3	2	7	13	
18	Sime Fantela (CRO)	2	2	3	7	15	
18	Igor Marenic (CRO)	2	2	3	7	15	
20	Francisco Sánchez (ESP)	2	2	0	4	7	
20	Susanne Bauckholtc (GER)	2	2	0	4	8	
20	Katrin Adlkofer (GER)	2	2	0	4	7	
20	Wolfgang Hunger (GER)	2	2	0	4	11	
20	Jordi Calafat (ESP)	2	2	0	4	8	
25	Lisa Westerhof (NED)	2	1	1	4	10	
25	Jolanta Ogar (POL)	2	1	1	4	13	
25	Lara Vadlau (AUT)	2	1	1	4	6	
25	Miho Yoshioka (JPN)	2	1	1	4	8	
29	Benny Kouwenhoven (NED)	2	1	0	3	6	
30	Rolf Schmidt (GER)	2	0	0	2	4	
30	Ines Bohn (GER)	2	0	0	2	5	
30	Sabine Rohatzsch (GER)	2	0	0	2	4	
30	Jan Kouwenhoven (NED)	2	0	0	2	5	
30	Begona Via Dufresne (ESP)	2	0	0	2	3	
30	Nic Asher (GBR)	2	0	0	2	9	
30	Elliot Willis (GBR)	2	0	0	2	12	

== Medallists ==
=== Open ===
Year	Gold	Silver	Bronze
1970 Lake Lacanau	France; Yves Carré; Hervé Carré	France; Philippe Follenfant; Hubert Follenfant	France; Didier Poisson; Denis Londeix
1971 Ostend	Netherlands; Tom van Essen; Wouter van Essen	France; Philippe Follenfant; Hubert Follenfant	France; Bruno Demartial; Bernard Demartial
1972 Montreal	Netherlands; Sjoerd Vollebregt; Erik Vollebregt	France; Philippe Follenfant; Hubert Follenfant	Netherlands; Tom van Essen; Wouter van Essen
1973 Kiel	Denmark; Henrik Söderlund; Age Börresen	United States; Peter Commette; Michael Loeb	Netherlands; Joop van Werkhoven; Robert van Werkhoven
1974 Naples	Spain; Antonio Gorostegui; Manuel Albalat	France; Philippe Lecrit; Dominique Duvallet	Spain; Juan Santana; Francisco Colom
1975 New York	France; Marc Laurent; Roger Surmin	France; Philippe Follenfant; Hubert Follenfant	France; Jean-François Fountaine; Claire Fountaine
1976	not held		
1977 Shizuoka	United States; David Ullman; Tom Linskey	Japan; Kazunori Komatsu; Yasuyuki Hakomori	New Zealand; Mark Paterson; David Mackay
1978 Marstrand	United States; David Ullman; Tom Linskey	Canada; Gerry Roufs; Charles Robitaille	West Germany; John Pudenz; Ulrich Kittmann
1979 Medemblik	Japan; Miyuki Kay; Ryo Komiya	France; Laurent Delage; Hervé Wattine	France; Stéphane Richer; Philippe Claude
1980 Porto Alegre	United States; David Ullman; Tom Linskey	France; Laurent Delage; Hervé Wattine	France; Stéphane Richer; Philippe Claude
1981 Quiberon	New Zealand; David Barnes; Hamish Willcox	United States; Steve Benjamin; Chris Steinfeld	Italy; Tommaso Chieffi; Enrico Chieffi
1982 Cascais	East Germany; Jörn Borowski; Egbert Swensson	France; Daniel Peponnet; Pascal Champaloux	New Zealand; David Barnes; Hamish Willcox
1983 Weymouth	New Zealand; David Barnes; Hamish Willcox	West Germany; Wolfgang Hunger; Jochen Hunger	Israel; Shimshon Brokman; Eitan Friedlander
1984 Auckland	New Zealand; David Barnes; Hamish Willcox	New Zealand; Chris Dickson; Joey Allen	New Zealand; Peter Evans; Sean Reeves

=== Men and Mixed ===
Year	Gold	Silver	Bronze
1985 Carrara	Italy; Tommaso Chieffi; Enrico Chieffi	France; Thierry Peponnet; Luc Pillot	East Germany; Jörn Borowski; Mathias Gall
1986 Salou	France; Thierry Peponnet; Luc Pillot	West Germany; Wolfgang Hunger; Jochen Hunger	West Germany; Ludger Hüttermann; Nils Körte
1987 Kiel	East Germany; Bernd Hoeft; Falko Bier	Italy; Pietro D'Alì; Giuseppe Cojana	East Germany; Jürgen Brietzke; Ekkehard Schulz
1988 Haifa	Great Britain; Nigel Buckley; Peter Newlands	Italy; Sandro Montefusco; Paolo Montefusco	United States; John Shadden; Charles McKee
1989 Tsu	Japan; Tomoaki Tsutsumi; Nobuhiro Tsutsumi	Spain; Jordi Calafat; Kiko Sánchez	Japan; Kenji Nakamura; Masayuki Takahashi
1990 Medemblik	West Germany; Wolfgang Hunger; Rolf Schmidt	Spain; Jordi Calafat; Kiko Sánchez	France; Olivier Ponthieu; Gilles Espinasse
1991 Brisbane	Germany; Wolfgang Hunger; Rolf Schmidt	Netherlands; Lankhorst Taselaar; Ben Kouwenhoven	Great Britain; Paul Brotherton; Andy Hemmings
1992 Rota	Spain; Jordi Calafat; Kiko Sánchez	Italy; Matteo Ivaldi; Michele Ivaldi	Finland; Perti Leskinen; Mika Aarnikka
1993 Crozon-Morgat	Spain; Jordi Calafat; Kiko Sánchez	France; Jean-François Berthet; Gwenaël Berthet	Israel; Shai Bachar; Erez Shemesh
1994 Helsinki	Netherlands; Ben Kouwenhoven; Jan Kouwenhoven	Japan; Kenji Nakamura; Masato Takaki	Sweden; Markus Westerlind; Henrik Wallin
1995 Toronto	Greece; Andreas Kosmatopoulos; Costas Trigonis	Italy; Matteo Ivaldi; Michelle Ivaldi	Israel; Ran Shantal; Nir Shental
1996 Porto Alegre	Netherlands; Ben Kouwenhoven; Jan Kouwenhoven	Great Britain; John Merricks; Ian Walker	Japan; Kenji Nakamura; Masato Takaki
1997 Tel Aviv	Finland; Petri Leskinen; Kristian Heinilä	Portugal; Hugo Rocha; Nuno Barreto	Sweden; Marcus Westerlind; Henrik Wallin
1998 Mallorca	France; Gildas Philippe; Tanguy Cariou	Slovenia; Tomaž Čopi; Mitja Margon	Sweden; Johan Molund; Mattias Rahm
1999 Melbourne	France; Benoit Petit; Jean-Francois Cuzon	Sweden; Johan Molund; Mattias Rahm	Poland; Tomasz Stańczyk; Tomasz Jakubiak
2000 Lake Balaton	Australia; Tom King; Mark Turnbull	France; Gildas Philippe; Tanguy Cariou	Ukraine; Yevhen Braslavets; Ihor Matviienko
2001 Koper	Ukraine; Yevhen Braslavets; Ihor Matviienko	Great Britain; Nick Rogers; Joe Glanfield	Australia; Nathan Wilmot; Malcolm Page
2002 Cagliari	New Zealand; Simon Cooke; Peter Nicholas	Greece; Andreas Kosmatopoulos; Konstantinos Trigkonis	Spain; Gustavo Martínez; Tunte Cantero

=== Men ===
Year	Gold	Silver	Bronze
2003 Cádiz	Italy; Gabrio Zandonà; Andrea Trani	Australia; Nathan Wilmot; Malcolm Page	Spain; Gustavo Martínez; Dimas Wood
2004 Zadar	Australia; Nathan Wilmot; Malcolm Page	Sweden; Johan Molund; Martin Andersson	Great Britain; Nick Rogers; Jonathan Glanfield
2005 San Francisco	Australia; Nathan Wilmot; Malcolm Page	Great Britain; Nick Rogers; Jonathan Glanfield	France; Gildas Philippe; Nicolas le Berre
2006 Rizhao	Great Britain; Nic Asher; Elliot Willis	Australia; Nathan Wilmot; Malcolm Page	Israel; Gideon Kliger; Udi Gal
2007 Cascais	Australia; Nathan Wilmot; Malcolm Page	Netherlands; Sven Coster; Kalle Coster	Israel; Gideon Kliger; Udi Gal
2008 Mordialloc	Great Britain; Nic Asher; Elliot Willis	Portugal; Álvaro Marinho; Miguel Nunes	Israel; Gideon Kliger; Udi Gal
2009 Copenhagen	Croatia; Šime Fantela; Igor Marenić	Great Britain; Luke Patience; Stuart Bithell	Japan; Ryunosuke Harada; Yugo Yoshida
2010 The Hague	Australia; Mathew Belcher; Malcolm Page	France; Nicolas Charbonnier; Baptiste Meyer	Croatia; Šime Fantela; Igor Marenić
2011 Perth	Australia; Mathew Belcher; Malcolm Page	Great Britain; Luke Patience; Stuart Bithell	Croatia; Šime Fantela; Igor Marenić
2012 Barcelona	Australia; Mathew Belcher; Malcolm Page	France; Pierre Leboucher; Vincent Garos	Croatia; Šime Fantela; Igor Marenić
2013 La Rochelle	Australia; Mathew Belcher; Will Ryan	France; Pierre Leboucher; Nicolas le Berre	Greece; Panagiotis Mantis; Pavlos Kagialis
2014 Santander	Australia; Mathew Belcher; Will Ryan	Croatia; Šime Fantela; Igor Marenić	Greece; Panagiotis Mantis; Pavlos Kagialis
2015 Haifa	Australia; Mathew Belcher; Will Ryan	Croatia; Šime Fantela; Igor Marenić	Russia; Pavel Sozykin; Denis Gribanov
2016 San Isidro	Croatia; Šime Fantela; Igor Marenić	New Zealand; Paul Snow-Hansen; Daniel Willcox	Australia; Mathew Belcher; Will Ryan
2017 Thessaloniki	Australia; Mathew Belcher; Will Ryan	Sweden; Anton Dahlberg; Fredrik Bergström	Austria; David Bargher; Lukas Mähr
2018 Aarhus	France; Kevin Peponnet; Jérémie Mion	Japan; Tetsuya Isozaki; Akira Takayanagi	Spain; Jordi Xammar; Nicolás Rodríguez
2019 Enoshima	Australia; Mathew Belcher; Will Ryan	Spain; Jordi Xammar; Nicolás Rodríguez	Sweden; Anton Dahlberg; Fredrik Bergström
2021 Vilamoura	Sweden; Anton Dahlberg; Fredrik Bergström	Portugal; Diogo Costa; Pedro Costa	Spain; Jordi Xammar; Nicolás Rodríguez

=== Women ===
Year	Gold	Silver	Bronze
1985 Carrara	Canada; Karen Johnson; Katrin Johnson	Netherlands; Tonny Vooren; Henneke Stavenuiter	Italy; Paola Porta; Anna Barabino
1986	not held to avoid conflict with the IYRU Women's World Championship		
1987 Kiel	West Germany; Susanne Meyer; Katrin Adlkofer	United States; Pease Herndon; Cindy Goff	East Germany; Susanne Theel; Silke Preuß
1988 Haifa	Sweden; Marit Söderström; Birgitta Bengtsson	United States; Lisa Niece; Patricia Raymond	United States; J. J. Isler; Amy Wardell
1989 Tsu	West Germany; Susanne Meyer; Katrin Adlkofer	New Zealand; Leslie Egnot; Jan Shearer	Great Britain; S. Rees Jones; S. Hay
1990 Medemblik	West Germany; Tanja Stemmler; Sabine Lenkmann	East Germany; Peggy Hardwiger; Christina Pinnow	Spain; Núria Bover; Irene Martín
1991 Brisbane	United States; J. J. Isler; Pamela Healy	Soviet Union; Larisa Moskalenko; Olena Pakholchyk	Germany; Susanne Peters; Wibke Bülle
1992 Rota	Spain; Theresa Zabell; Patricia Guerra	Japan; Yumiko Shige; Alicia Kinoshita	Italy; Maria Quarra; Anna Barabino
1993 Crozon-Morgat	Germany; Ines Bohn; Sabine Rohatzsch	Spain; Theresa Zabell; Patricia Guerra	Italy; Frederica Salva; Emanuela Sossi
1994 Helsinki	Germany; Ines Bohn; Sabine Rohatzsch	Germany; Susanne Bauckholt; Katrin Adlkofer	Germany; Peggy Hardwiger; Christina Pinnow
1995 Toronto	Spain; Theresa Zabell; Begoña Vía Dufresne	Ukraine; Ruslana Taran; Olena Pakholchyk	Japan; Yumiko Shige; Alicia Konoshita
1996 Porto Alegre	Spain; Theresa Zabell; Begoña Vía Dufresne	Germany; Susanne Bauckholt; Katrin Adlkofer	Germany; Nicola Birkner; Wibke Bülle
1997 Tel Aviv	Ukraine; Ruslana Taran; Olena Pakholchyk	Germany; Nicola Birkner; Wibke Bülle	Ukraine; Vlada Krachun; Natalia Gaponovitsch
1998 Mallorca	Ukraine; Ruslana Taran; Olena Pakholchyk	Denmark; Susanne Ward; Michaela Ward	Germany; Nicola Birkner; Wibke Bülle
1999 Melbourne	Ukraine; Ruslana Taran; Olena Pakholchyk	Denmark; Susanne Ward; Michaela Ward	Italy; Federica Salvà; Emanuela Sossi
2000 Lake Balaton	Greece; Sofia Bekatorou; Emilia Tsoulfa	Australia; Jenny Armstrong; Belinda Stowell	Spain; Natalia Vía Dufresne; Sandra Azón
2001 Koper	Greece; Sofia Bekatorou; Emilia Tsoulfa	Australia; Jenny Armstrong; Belinda Stowell	Spain; Natalia Vía Dufresne; Sandra Azón
2002 Cagliari	Greece; Sofia Bekatorou; Emilia Tsoulfa	Netherlands; Lisa Westerhof; Margriet Matthijsse	France; Ingrid Petitjean; Nadège Douroux
2003 Cádiz	Greece; Sofia Bekatorou; Emilia Tsoulfa	France; Ingrid Petitjean; Nadège Douroux	Russia; Wlada Iljenko; Natalia Gaponovitsch
2004 Zadar	Sweden; Therese Torgersson; Vendela Zachrisson	Slovenia; Vesna Dekleva; Klara Maučec	Israel; Nike Kornecki; Vered Buskila
2005 San Francisco	Netherlands; Marcelien de Koning; Lobke Berkhout	Great Britain; Christina Bassadone; Saskia Clark	France; Ingrid Petitjean; Nadège Douroux
2006 Rizhao	Netherlands; Marcelien de Koning; Lobke Berkhout	Japan; Ai Kondo; Naoko Kamata	Sweden; Therese Torgersson; Vendela Zachrisson
2007 Cascais	Netherlands; Marcelien de Koning; Lobke Berkhout	France; Ingrid Petitjean; Nadège Douroux	Great Britain; Christina Bassadone; Saskia Clark
2008 Mordialloc	United States; Erin Maxwell; Isabelle Kinsolving	Italy; Giulia Conti; Giovanna Micol	Australia; Elise Rechichi; Tessa Parkinson
2009 Copenhagen	Netherlands; Lisa Westerhof; Lobke Berkhout	Spain; Tara Pacheco; Berta Betanzos	France; Ingrid Petitjean; Nadège Douroux
2010 The Hague	Netherlands; Lisa Westerhof; Lobke Berkhout	New Zealand; Jo Aleh; Polly Powrie	Italy; Giulia Conti; Giovanna Micol
2011 Perth	Spain; Tara Pacheco; Berta Betanzos	Great Britain; Hannah Mills; Saskia Clark	New Zealand; Jo Aleh; Polly Powrie
2012 Barcelona	Great Britain; Hannah Mills; Saskia Clark	France; Camille Lecointre; Mathilde Géron	Netherlands; Lisa Westerhof; Lobke Berkhout
2013 La Rochelle	New Zealand; Jo Aleh; Polly Powrie	Austria; Lara Vadlau; Jolanta Ogar	China; Wang Xiaoli; Huang Xufeng
2014 Santander	Austria; Lara Vadlau; Jolanta Ogar	New Zealand; Jo Aleh; Polly Powrie	Great Britain; Hannah Mills; Saskia Clark
2015 Haifa	Austria; Lara Vadlau; Jolanta Ogar	Great Britain; Hannah Mills; Saskia Clark	France; Camille Lecointre; Hélène Defrance
2016 San Isidro	France; Camille Lecointre; Hélène Defrance	New Zealand; Jo Aleh; Polly Powrie	Austria; Lara Vadlau; Jolanta Ogar
2017 Thessaloniki	Poland; Agnieszka Skrzypulec; Irmina Mróz-Gliszczyńska	Great Britain; Hannah Mills; Eilidh McIntyre	Slovenia; Tina Mrak; Veronika Macarol
2018 Aarhus	Japan; Ai Yoshida; Miho Yoshioka	Spain; Silvia Mas; Patricia Cantero	Great Britain; Hannah Mills; Eilidh McIntyre
2019 Enoshima	Great Britain; Hannah Mills; Eilidh McIntyre	Japan; Ai Yoshida; Miho Yoshioka	France; Camille Lecointre; Aloïse Retornaz
2021 Vilamoura	Spain; Silvia Mas; Patricia Cantero	Netherlands; Afrodite Zegers; Lobke Berkhout	Italy; Elena Berta; Bianca Caruso

=== Mixed ===
Year	Gold	Silver	Bronze
2021	ISR-311; Gil Cohen (ISR); Noam Homri (ISR)	ISR-121; Tal Sade (ISR); Noa Lasry (ISR)	GBR-7; Amy Seabright (GBR); James Taylor (GBR)
2022	GER-10; Luise Wanser (GER); Philipp Autenrieth (GER)	ESP-44; Jordi Xammar (ESP); Nora Brugman (ESP)	FRA-1; Camille Lecointre (FRA); Jérémie Mion (FRA)
2023	JPN; Keiju Okada (JPN); Miho Yoshioka (JPN)	ESP; Jordi Xammar (ESP); Nora Brugman (ESP)	JPN; Tetsuya Isozaki (JPN); Yurie Seki (JPN)
2024	ESP 44; Jordi Xammar (ESP); Nora Brugman (ESP)	GBR 4 Vita Heathcote (GBR); Chris Grube (GBR)	JPN 8 Keiju Okada (JPN); Miho Yoshioka (JPN)
2025	ESP 44; Jordi Xammar (ESP); Marta Cardona (ESP)	GER 11; Simon Diesch (GER); Anna Markfort (GER)	GBR 55; Martin Wrigley (GBR); Bettine Harris (GBR)
2026	GBR 55; Martin Wrigley (GBR); Bettine Harris (GBR)	GER 50; Theresa Löffler (GER); Christopher Hörr (GER)	ESP 44; Jordi Xammar (ESP); Marta Cardona (ESP)

== See also ==
- 470 Junior World Championships
- World championships in sailing
- World Sailing
