= Semaine Olympique Française =

Sailing regatta

- Organizer: French Sailing Federation
- Classes: ILCA 6, ILCA 7, 470, 49er, 49er FX, Nacra 17, IQFoil, Formula Kite
- Venue: Hyères
- Website: sof.ffvoile.fr

The Semaine Olympique Française (lit. 'French Olympic Week') is a sailing regatta organised in Hyères by the French Sailing Federation, whose 2023 edition is the 54th edition and open to women's ILCA 6, men's ILCA 7, mixed 470, men's 49er, women's 49er FX, mixed Nacra 17, men's and women's IQFoil, and men's and women's Formula Kite.

In 2014, the Semaine Olympique Française in Hyères became an event in the Sailing World Cup, and a regatta in La Rochelle took the name, Semaine Olympique Française La Rochelle.

It is considered a major regatta by the Finn class and a spring classic by French newspaper L'Équipe.

Together with the Trofeo Princesa Sofía, Allianz Regatta, and Kiel Week regattas, Semaine Olympique Française is part of the Sailing World Cup in the 2023 and 2024 seasons. The 2023 edition has almost 1000 entries from 60 countries.

== One Person Dinghy - Female ==
=== Europe ===
- 1990 – Mette Gurvin (NOR)
- 1992 – Tine Moberg (CAN)
- 1994 – Arianna Bogatec (ITA)
- 1995 – Helen Montilla (ESP)
- 1996 – Carolijn Brouwer (NED)
- 1997 – Carolijn Brouwer (NED)
- 1999 – Margriet Matthijsse (NED)
- 2002 – Petra Niemann (GER)
- 2003 – Siren Sundby (NOR)
- 2004 – Siren Sundby (NOR)

=== ILCA 6 (formerly known as Laser Radial) ===
- 2005 – Sophie de Turckheim (FRA)
- 2006 – Paige Railey (USA)
- 2007 – Evi Van Acker (BEL)
- 2008 – Sarah Blanck (AUS)
- 2009 – Anna Tunnicliffe (USA)
- 2010 – Aušra Milevičiūtė (LTU)
- 2011 – Sara Winther (NZL)
- 2012 – Xu Lijia (CHN)
- 2013 – Marit Bouwmeester (NED)
- 2014 – Evi Van Acker (BEL)
- 2015 – Evi Van Acker (BEL)
- 2016 – Evi Van Acker (BEL)
- 2017 – Evi Van Acker (BEL)
- 2018 – Marit Bouwmeester (NED)
- 2022 – Agata Barwińska (POL)
- 2023 – Sarah Douglas (CAN)
- 2024 – Charlotte Rose (USA)

== One Person Dinghy ==
- 1970 – Guy Liljegren (SWE)
- 1971 – Serge Maury (FRA)
- 1972 – Serge Maury (FRA)
- 1973 – M. Busquet (FRA)
- 1975 – Mauro Pelaschier (ITA)
- 1976 – David Howlett (GBR)
- 1977 – Chris Law (GBR)
- 1978 – Jochen Schümann (FRG)
- 1979 – Guy Liljegren (SWE)
- 1980 – Joaquín Blanco Roca (ESP)
- 1981 – François Le Castrec (FRA)
- 1982 – Wolfgang Gerz (FRG)
- 1983 – Jørgen Lindhardsen (DEN)
- 1984 – Oleg Khopyorsky (URS)
- 1985 – Oleg Khopyorsky (URS)
- 1986 – Paolo Semeraro (ITA)
- 1987 – Hans Spitzauer (AUT)
- 1988 – Hans Spitzauer (AUT)
- 1989 – Armanto Ortolano (GRE)
- 1990 – Jali Mäkilä (FIN)
- 1991 – Jali Mäkilä (FIN)
- 1992 – Dirk Loewe (GER)
- 1993 – Roy Heiner (NED)
- 1994 – José van der Ploeg (ESP)
- 1995 – José van der Ploeg (ESP)
- 1996 – Sébastien Godefroid (BEL)
- 1997 – Fredrik Lööf (SWE)
- 1998 – Sébastien Godefroid (BEL)
- 1999 – Mateusz Kusznierewicz (POL)
- 2000 – Richard Clarke (CAN)
- 2001 – Mateusz Kusznierewicz (POL)
- 2002 – Mateusz Kusznierewicz (POL)
- 2003 – Sébastien Godefroid (BEL)
- 2004 – Aimilios Papathanasiou (GRE)
- 2005 – Aimilios Papathanasiou (GRE)
- 2006 – Ed Wright (GBR)
- 2007 – Aimilios Papathanasiou (GRE)
- 2008 – Jonas Høgh-Christensen (DEN)
- 2009 – Ivan Kljaković Gašpić (CRO)
- 2010 – Marin Mišura (CRO)
- 2011 – Ben Ainslie (GBR)
- 2012 – Brendan Casey (AUS)
- 2013 – Andrew Mills (GBR)
- 2014 – Pieter-Jan Postma (NED)
- 2015 – Giles Scott (GBR)
- 2016 – Jake Lilley (AUS)
- 2017 – Alican Kaynar (TUR)
- 2018 – Jorge Zarif (BRA)

=== ILCA 7 (formerly known as Laser) ===
- 1994 – Andrea Casale (ITA)
- 1995 – Peer Moberg (NOR)
- 1996 – Peer Moberg (NOR)
- 1997 – Ben Ainslie (GBR)
- 1999 – Peder Rønholt (DEN)
- 2002 – Paul Goodison (GBR)
- 2003 – Roope Suomalainen (FIN)
- 2004 – Robert Scheidt (BRA)
- 2005 – Tom Slingsby (AUS)
- 2006 – Tom Slingsby (AUS)
- 2007 – Michael Blackburn (AUS)
- 2008 – Mike Leigh (CAN)
- 2009 – Paul Goodison (GBR)
- 2010 – Paul Goodison (GBR)
- 2011 – Javier Hernández (ESP)
- 2012 – Philipp Buhl (GER)
- 2013 – Tom Burton (AUS)
- 2014 – Tom Burton (AUS)
- 2015 – Tom Burton (AUS)
- 2016 – Philipp Buhl (GER)
- 2017 – Pavlos Kontides (CYP)
- 2018 – Jean-Baptiste Bernaz (FRA)
- 2022 – Pavlos Kontides (CYP)
- 2023 – Elliot Hanson (GBR)

== Two Person Dinghy ==
=== Men's 470 ===
- 1990 – Martin Fuchs (FRG)
- 1992 – Björn Bengtsson (SWE)
- 1994 – Matteo Ivaldi (ITA)
- 1995 – John Merricks (GBR)
- 1996 – John Merricks (GBR)
- 1999 – Paul Foerster & Bob Merrick (USA)
- 2002 – Nathan Wilmot (AUS)
- 2003 – Johan Molund (SWE)
- 2004 – Benjamin Bonnaud (FRA)
- 2005 – Gideon Kliger (ISR)
- 2006 – Gideon Kliger (ISR)
- 2007 – Pierre Leboucher (FRA)
- 2008 – Nick Rogers & Joe Glanfield (GBR)
- 2009 – Matías Bühler & Felix Steiger (SUI)
- 2010 – Nicolas Charbonnier & Baptiste Meyer (FRA)
- 2011 – Pierre Leboucher & Vincent Garos (FRA)
- 2012 – Mathew Belcher & Malcolm Page (AUS)
- 2013 – Mathew Belcher & Will Ryan (AUS)
- 2014 – Mathew Belcher & Will Ryan (AUS)
- 2015 – Šime Fantela & Igor Marenić (CRO)
- 2016 – Šime Fantela & Igor Marenić (CRO)
- 2017 – Mathew Belcher & Will Ryan (AUS)
- 2018 – Anton Dahlberg & Fredrik Bergström (SWE)

=== Women's 470 ===
- 1990 – Larisa Moskalenko (URS)
- 1992 – Peggy Hardwiger (GER)
- 1994 – Theresa Zabell (ESP)
- 1995 – Theresa Zabell (ESP)
- 1996 – Theresa Zabell (ESP)
- 1997 – Ruslana Taran (UKR)
- 1999 – Federica Salvà & Emanuela Sossi (ITA)
- 2002 – Sofia Bekatorou (GRE)
- 2003 – Sofia Bekatorou (GRE)
- 2004 – Ingrid Petitjean (FRA)
- 2005 – Ingrid Petitjean (FRA)
- 2006 – Adi Gilboa & Vered Buskila (ISR)
- 2007 – Giulia Conti (ITA)
- 2008 – Ai Kondo & Naoko Kamata (JPN)
- 2009 – Henriette Koch & Lene Sommer (DEN)
- 2010 – Emmanuelle Rol & Hélène Defrance (FRA)
- 2011 – Tara Pacheco & Berta Betanzos (ESP)
- 2012 – Lisa Westerhof & Lobke Berkhout (NED)
- 2013 – Fernanda Oliveira & Ana Barbachan (BRA)
- 2014 – Jo Aleh & Polly Powrie (NZL)
- 2015 – Fernanda Oliveira & Ana Luiza Barbachan (BRA)
- 2016 – Hannah Mills & Saskia Clark (GBR)
- 2017 – Afrodite Zegers & Anneloes van Veen (NED)
- 2018 – Camille Lecointre & Aloïse Retornaz (FRA)

=== Mixed 470 ===
- 2022 – Anton Dahlberg & Lovisa Karlsson (SWE)
- 2023 – Jordi Xammar & Nora Brugman (ESP)

== Male Skiff 49er ==
- 1997 – Yves Loday (FRA)
- 1999 – Michael Hestbæk & Jonatan Persson (DEN)
- 2002 – Iker Martínez de Lizarduy (ESP)
- 2003 – Rodion Luka (UKR)
- 2004 – Pietro Sibello (ITA)
- 2005 – Jan-Peter Peckolt (GER)
- 2006 – Iker Martínez de Lizarduy (ESP)
- 2007 – Chris Draper (GBR)
- 2008 – Iker Martínez de Lizarduy & Xabier Fernández (ESP)
- 2009 – Pietro Sibello & Gianfranco Sibello (ITA)
- 2010 – Paul Brotherton & Mark Asquith (GBR)
- 2011 – Pietro Sibello & Gianfranco Sibello (ITA)
- 2012 – Emmanuel Dyen & Stéphane Christidis (FRA)
- 2013 – Dylan Fletcher-Scott & Alain Sign (GBR)
- 2014 – Peter Burling & Blair Tuke (NZL)
- 2015 – Peter Burling & Blair Tuke (NZL)
- 2016 – Peter Burling & Blair Tuke (NZL)
- 2017 – Diego Botín & Iago López (ESP)
- 2018 – Dominik Buksak & Szymon Wierzbicki (POL)
- 2022 – Dominik Buksak & Szymon Wierzbicki (POL)
- 2023 – Diego Botín & Florián Trittel (ESP)

== Female 49er FX ==
- 2013 – Alex Maloney & Molly Meech (NZL)
- 2014 – Martine Grael & Kahena Kunze (BRA)
- 2015 – Ida Marie Baad Nielsen & Marie Thusgaard Olsen (DEN)
- 2016 – Lisa Ericson & Hanna Klinga (SWE)
- 2017 – Martine Grael & Kahena Kunze (BRA)
- 2018 – Alex Maloney & Molly Meech (NZL)
- 2022 – Martine Grael & Kahena Kunze (BRA)
- 2023 – Odile van Aanholt & Annette Duetz (NED)

== Keelboats ==
=== Elliott 6m ===
- 2010 – Silke Hahlbrock, Maren Hahlbrock & Kerstin Schult (GER)
- 2011 – Lucy MacGregor, Annie Lush & Kate MacGregor (GBR)
- 2012 – Anna Tunnicliffe, Deborah Capozzi & Molly Vandemoer (USA)

=== Soling ===
- 1990 – Morten Henriksen (FRG)
- 1992 – Morten Henriksen (GER)
- 1994 – Magnus Holmberg (SWE)
- 1995 – Jesper Bank (DEN)
- 1996 – Magnus Holmberg (SWE)
- 1997 – Jochen Schümann (GER)
- 1999 – Roy Heiner, Dirk de Ridder & van (NED)

=== Star ===
- 2009 – Xavier Rohart & Pierre-Alexis Ponsot (FRA)
- 2010 – Eivind Melleby & Petter Mørland Pedersen (NOR)
- 2011 – Robert Scheidt & Bruno Prada (BRA)
- 2012 – Iain Percy & Andrew Simpson (GBR)

=== Yngling ===
- 2002 – Ana Llaca Díaz (ESP)
- 2003 – Ulrike Schümann (GER)
- 2004 – Shirley Robertson (GBR)
- 2005 – Sally Barkow (USA)
- 2006 – Sally Barkow (USA)
- 2007 – Yekaterina Skudina (RUS)
- 2008 – Siren Sundby, Lise Birgitte Fredriksen & Alexandra Koefoed (NOR)

== Multihulls ==
=== Tornado ===
- 1990 – Norbert Petschel (AUT)
- 1992 – Michel Faou (FRA)
- 1994 – Andreas Hagara (AUT)
- 1995 – Roland Gäbler (GER)
- 1996 – Roland Gäbler (GER)
- 1997 – Ron van Teylingen (NED)
- 1999 – Roman Hagara & Hans-Peter Steinacher (AUT)
- 2002 – Olivier Backes (FRA)
- 2003 – Mitch Booth (NED)
- 2004 – Mitch Booth (NED)
- 2005 – Xavier Revil (FRA)
- 2006 – Xavier Revil (FRA)
- 2007 – Oskar Johansson (CAN)
- 2008 – Darren Bundock & Glenn Ashby (AUS)

=== Nacra 17 ===
- 2013 – Tim Shuwalow & Hanna Klinga (SWE)
- 2014 – Vittorio Bissaro & Silvia Sicouri (ITA)
- 2015 – Billy Besson & Marie Riou (FRA)
- 2016 – Fernando Echávarri & Tara Pacheco (ESP)
- 2017 – Fernando Echávarri & Tara Pacheco (ESP)
- 2018 – Ruggero Tita & Caterina Banti (ITA)
- 2022 – Ruggero Tita & Caterina Banti (ITA)
- 2023 – John Gimson & Anna Burnet (GBR)

== Formula Kite ==
=== Open Formula Kite ===
- 2017 – Nicolas Parlier (FRA)

=== Men's Formula Kite ===
- 2022 – Maximilian Maeder (SGP)
- 2023 – Axel Mazella (FRA)

=== Women's Formula Kite ===
- 2022 – Daniela Moroz (USA)
- 2023 – Lauriane Nolot (FRA)

== Disabled Sailing ==
=== 2.4 Metre ===
- 2008 – Damien Seguin (FRA)
- 2009 – Damien Seguin (FRA)
- 2010 – Damien Seguin (FRA)
- 2011 – Damien Seguin (FRA)
- 2012 – Damien Seguin (FRA)
- 2013 – Heiko Kröger (GER)
- 2014 – Heiko Kröger (GER)
- 2015 – Damien Seguin (FRA)
- 2016 – Matthew Bugg (AUS)
- 2017 – Damien Seguin (FRA)
- 2018 – Damien Seguin (FRA)

=== Skud 18 ===
- 2011 – Alexandra Rickham & Niki Birrell (GBR)
- 2012 – Daniel Fitzgibbon & Liesl Tesch (AUS)

=== Sonar ===
- 2008 – John Robertson, Hannah Stodel & Stephen Thomas (GBR)
- 2010 – Dror Cohen, Arnon Efrati & Benny Vexler (ISR)
- 2011 – Bruno Jourdren, Eric Flageul & Nicolas Vimont-Vicary (FRA)
- 2012 – John Robertson, Hannah Stodel & Stephen Thomas (GBR)
- 2013 – Bruno Jourdren, Eric Flageul & Nicolas Vimont-Vicary (FRA)
- 2014 – John Robertson, Hannah Stodel & Stephen Thomas (GBR)
- 2015 – Nicolas Vimont-Vicary, Bruno Jourdren & Eric Flageul (FRA)
- 2016 – Aleksander Wang-Hansen, Per Eugen Kristiansen & Marie Solberg (NOR)

== Windsurfing ==
Year	Class	Male Winner	Female Winner	Ref.
1990	Lechner A-390	Michel Quintin (FRA)	Penny Way (GBR)	
1992	Lechner A-390	Timm Stade (GER)	Maud Herbert (FRA)	
1993	Lechner A-390			
1994	Mistral	Nicolas Mallaret Laneyrie (FRA)	Lee Lai-shan (HKG)	
1995	Mistral	Nikolaos Kaklamanakis (GRE)	Lee Lai-shan (HKG)	
1996	Mistral	João Rodrigues (POR)	Lee Lai-shan (HKG)	
1997	Mistral	Tony Philp (FIJ)	Alessandra Sensini (ITA)	
1999	Mistral	Alexandre Guyader (FRA)	Alessandra Sensini (ITA)	
2002	Mistral	Alexandre Guyader (FRA)	Alessandra Sensini (ITA)	
2003	Mistral	JP Tobin (NZL)	Yin Jian (CHN)	
2004	Mistral	Fabrice Hassen (FRA)	Olha Maslivets (UKR)	
2005	RS:X	Iván Pastor (ESP)	Athina Frai (GRE)	
2006	RS:X	Casper Bouman (NED)	Marina Alabau (ESP)	
2007	RS:X	Tom Ashley (NZL)	Bryony Shaw (GBR)	
2008	RS:X	Ricardo Santos (BRA)	Zofia Noceti-Klepacka (POL)	
2009	RS:X	Shahar Tzuberi (ISR)	Chen Peina (CHN)	
2010	RS:X	Byron Kokkalanis (GRE)	Bryony Shaw (GBR)	
2011	RS:X	Piotr Myszka (POL)	Blanca Manchón (ESP)	
2012	RS:X	Julien Bontemps (FRA)	Moana Delle (GER)	
2013	RS:X	Przemysław Miarczyński (POL)	Bryony Shaw (GBR)	
2014	RS:X	Piotr Myszka (POL)	Moana Delle (GER)	
2015	RS:X	Pierre Le Coq (FRA)	Lilian de Geus (NED)	
2016	RS:X	Piotr Myszka (POL)	Zofia Noceti-Klepacka (POL)	
2017	RS:X	Louis Giard (FRA)	Zofia Noceti-Klepacka (POL)	
2018	RS:X	Pierre Le Coq (FRA)	Zofia Noceti-Klepacka (POL)	
2022	iQ Foil	Nicolas Goyard (FRA)	Hélène Noesmoen (FRA)	
2023	iQ Foil	Fabien Pianazza (FRA)	Barbora Švíková (CZE)	
