= 2003 ISAF Sailing World Championships =

Event title
- Edition: 1st

Event details
- Venue: Cádiz, Spain
- Dates: 3–24 September
- Titles: 11

Competitors
- Competitors: 1450
- Competing nations: 71
- Qualification(s): 2004 Summer Olympics

2003 ISAF Sailing World Championships was the first edition of the ISAF Sailing World Championships and was held in Cádiz, Spain from 11 September to 24 September.

== Venue ==
The venue for the 2003 ISAF Sailing World Championships was Cádiz with three marinas: El Puerto de Santa María for Mistral, Finn, Yngling, Europe, Star, Tornado and 49er, Cádiz for Laser and Rota for 470. Racing was held on nine race areas off Cádiz.

== Events and equipment ==
The following events were open for entries:

Event	Equipment	Max. entries
Men's one-person dinghy	Finn	90
Men's two-person dinghy	470	120
Men's keelboat	Star	120
Men's windsurfer	Mistral	120
Open one-person dinghy	Laser	160
Open two-person dinghy	49er	120
Open multihull	Tornado	80
Women's one-person dinghy	Europe	120
Women's two-person dinghy	470	80
Women's keelboat	Yngling	80
Women's windsurfer	Mistral	80

== Summary ==
=== Medal table ===
* Host nation (Spain)

Rank	Nation	Gold	Silver	Bronze	Total
1	Great Britain (GBR)	2	1	2	5
2	Australia (AUS)	1	1	1	3
2	France (FRA)	1	1	1	3
4	Greece (GRE)	1	1	0	2
4	Norway (NOR)	1	1	0	2
6	Israel (ISR)	1	0	1	2
6	United States (USA)	1	0	1	2
8	Italy (ITA)	1	0	0	1
8	Poland (POL)	1	0	0	1
8	Portugal (POR)	1	0	0	1
11	Spain (ESP)*	0	1	1	2
12	Brazil (BRA)	0	1	0	1
12	Finland (FIN)	0	1	0	1
12	Germany (GER)	0	1	0	1
12	New Zealand (NZL)	0	1	0	1
12	Sweden (SWE)	0	1	0	1
17	Argentina (ARG)	0	0	1	1
17	Denmark (DEN)	0	0	1	1
17	Russia (RUS)	0	0	1	1
17	Ukraine (UKR)	0	0	1	1
Totals (20 entries)		11	11	11	33

=== Event medalists ===
Event	Gold	Silver	Bronze
Men's 470	Italy; Gabrio Zandonà; Andrea Trani	Australia; Nathan Wilmot; Malcolm Page	Spain; Gustavo Martínez; Dimas Wood
Women's 470	Greece; Sofia Bekatorou; Emilia Tsoulfa	France; Ingrid Petitjean; Nadège Douroux	Russia; Vlada Ilyenko; Nataliya Gaponovich
49er	Great Britain; Christopher Draper; Simon Hiscocks	Norway; Christoffer Sundby; Frode Bovim	Ukraine; Rodion Luka; George Leonchuk
Europe	Siren Sundby (NOR)	Sari Multala (FIN)	Mary Gaillard (USA)
Finn	Ben Ainslie (GBR)	Rafael Trujillo (ESP)	Andrew Simpson (GBR)
Laser	Gustavo Lima (POR)	Robert Scheidt (BRA)	Michael Blackburn (AUS)
Men's Mistral	Przemysław Miarczyński (POL)	Nikolaos Kaklamanakis (GRE)	Gal Fridman (ISR)
Women's Mistral	Lee Korzits (ISR)	Barbara Kendall (NZL)	Faustine Merret (FRA)
Star	France; Xavier Rohart; Pascal Rambeau	Sweden; Fredrik Lööf; Anders Ekström	Great Britain; Iain Percy; Steve Mitchell
Tornado	Australia; Darren Bundock; John Forbes	Great Britain; Leigh McMillan; Mark Bulkeley	Argentina; Santiago Lange; Carlos Espinola
Yngling	United States; Hannah Swett; Joan Touchette; Melissa Purdy	Germany; Ulrike Schümann; Wibke Bülle; Winnie Lippert	Denmark; Dorte Jensen; Helle Jespersen; Rachel Kiel

== Men and women events ==
=== Mistral ===
==== Men ====
#	Sailor
	(Poland) Przemyslaw Miarczynski
	(Greece) Nikolaos Kaklamanakis
	(Israel) Gal Fridman
4	(Portugal) João Rodrigues
5	(France) Julien Bontemps
6	(United Kingdom) Nick Dempsey
7	(Netherlands) Jon-Paul Tobin
8	(France) Fabrice Hassen
9	(Netherlands) Joeri van Dijk
10	(France) Alexandre Guyader

==== Women ====
#	Sailor
	(Israel) Lee Korzits
	(New Zealand) Barbara Kendall
	(France) Faustine Merret
4	(Australia) Jessica Crisp
5	(France) Jeanne Mailhos
6	(China) Mingshuang Lai
7	(Australia) Allison Shreeve
8	(Belgium) Sigrid Rondelez
9	(Italy) Alessandra Sensini
10	(Poland) Zofia Klepacka

== Women events ==
=== Europe ===
#	Sailor
	(Norway) Siren Sundby
	(Finland) Sari Multala
	(United States) Mary Gaillard
