= Victor Kovalenko =

Victor Kovalenko OAM
Personal information
- Born: 5 August 1950 (age 76) Dnipro, Ukrainian SSR

Sailing career
- Sport: Sailing
- Classes: Flying Dutchman, Dragon, 470

Victor Kovalenko (Ukrainian: Віктор Володимирович Коваленко, romanized: Viktor Volodymyrovych Kovalenko; born 5 August 1950) is a Ukrainian sailor and coach, now the head coach of the Australian Olympic Sailing Team. Referred to as "the Medal Maker", Kovalenko has coached men and women sailors to 11 medals, seven of those gold, in Olympic Games, beginning in 1988.

== Biography ==
Kovalenko was born in Dnipro (then Dnipropetrovsk), Ukrainian SSR, on 5 August 1950. He learned to sail at the local "Meteor Club" at the age of 12. He became a member of USSR national sailing team in 1973, sailing in the Flying Dutchman and Dragon classes. In 1974, he won the national Flying Dutchman championship with Valery Maydan. That year he put racing aside to complete his education at the Nikolaev State Pedagogical Institute where he graduated with majors in Sport and Sport Science. He began sailing the 470 while at Nikolaev. He considers it the most difficult and most satisfying boat to sail. Kovalenko was USSR 470 champion in 1981 with Michail Kudryavtsev. His nickname was Flint.

Kovalenko's competitive career ended in 1984 when USSR boycotted the 1984 Summer Olympics. After his team was disbanded, he turned part-time coaching into a full-time career.

In 1983, it was announced that in 1988 women would be welcome to sail in the Olympics for the first time. The 470 was named as the first women's class. It fell to Kovelenko, a junior coach for USSR, to work with an inexperienced women's team of which little was expected. In four years, he coached former rower Larisa Moskalenko and her crew, Iryna Chunykhovska to a bronze medal in the women's 470 event at the 1988 Seoul Olympics.

In 1991, after the Soviet Union was dissolved, Kovalenko began coaching both men's and women's teams for Ukraine. The 1996 Atlanta Olympics were a huge success for the newly independent country's first Olympics. Ukrainians brought home nine gold medals, two medals of them in sailing, one gold and one bronze. But political upheaval within the country resulted in lack of support for the sailing team. When Kovalenko was recruited by Australia, he accepted and moved to Sydney in 1997.

His debut as Australia's coach at the 2000 Sydney Olympics resulted in gold medals for both the men's and women's teams in the 470 class. Immediately after the Sydney Olympics, he was appointed the inaugural head coach of the sailing program of the Australian Institute of Sport. Australia missed the podium in the coming 2004 Olympics in Athens, but at the 2008 Beijing Olympics, both Kovalenko's men's and women's 470 class teams each won gold medals.

At the 2012 London Olympics, the team of Mathew Belcher and Malcolm Page won gold for Australia in the 470 class. Belcher and Kovalenko had then been working together for 21 years.

At the 2016 Rio Olympics, the team of Mathew Belcher and Will Ryan won the silver medal in the 470 class.

His aim is to coach at the 2020 Tokyo Olympics after his wife said "Victor, you have to do Tokyo because you can’t finish your coaching career with a silver medal, you have to complete the job".

Kovalenko has coached the following 470 class crewed to Olympic gold medals:

- 1996 – Yevhen Braslavets and Ihor Matviyenko (Ukraine)
- 2000 – Tom King and Mark Turnbull; Jenny Armstrong and Belinda Stowell (Australia)
- 2008 – Nathan Wilmot and Malcolm Page; Elise Rechichi and Tessa Parkinson (Australia)
- 2012 – Mathew Belcher and Malcolm Page (Australia)
- 2020 – Mathew Belcher and William Ryan (Australia)

In 2017, the book Medal Maker written by Roger Vaughan on the Kovalenko's life and sailing career was published. A film about Kovalenko based on Roger Vaughn's biographical book about him of the same name Launch of 'The Medal Maker' – The story of Victor Kovalenko is currently being shot in different parts of the world.

== Personal life ==
In 1978, Kovalenko met his wife, Tatiana Savenkova. A track athlete who ran the 400 meters, Savenkova was a coach before becoming an elementary school teacher. They are parents of one son, Vladimir, and have one grand daughter.

== Accomplishments and honors as coach ==
- elewen Olympic medals (7 of them Gold) in 10 Olympic Games
- winner, 20 world championships
- two ISAF Rolex Sailors of the Year (Ruslana Taran, 470, 1997; Mathew Belcher, 470, 2013)
- winner, 14 European championships
- winner, 118 world class regattas
- Australian Coach of the Year – 2008, 2012
- OAM (Medal of the Order of Australia) – 2012
- Order of Merit (Ukraine) 2021
- Four medals from USSR and Ukrainian governments
- Member, Sport Australia Hall of Fame- 2013
- Inaugural member, Australian Sailing Hall of Fame – 2017
- Member, 470 class Hall of Fame
- Member, ISAF Coach's Commission
- Vice-President, International Coaches Association
- Honorary member, Royal Queensland Yacht Squadron, Royal Tasmania Yacht Club, Sandringham Yacht Club, Cruising Yacht Club of Australia, Middle Harbor Yacht Club, Monaco Yacht Club
- Ambassador, Australia Day – 2000, 2013, 2017, 2020, 2025
