= 2007 ISAF Sailing World Championships =

Event title
- Edition: 2nd

Event details
- Venue: Cascais, Portugal
- Dates: 28 June – 13 July
- Titles: 11

Competitors
- Competitors: 1350
- Competing nations: 76
- Qualification(s): 2008 Summer Olympics

2007 ISAF Sailing World Championships was the second edition of the ISAF Sailing World Championships and was held in Cascais, Portugal on the Portuguese Riviera from 28 June to 13 July.

== Venue ==
The venue for the 2007 ISAF Sailing World Championships was Cascais and racing was held on five race areas off Cascais.

== Events and equipment ==
The following events were open for entries:

Event	Equipment	Max. entries
Men's one-person dinghy	Laser	150
Men's two-person dinghy	470	120
Men's keelboat	Star	80
Men's windsurfer	RS:X	120
Open one-person dinghy (heavyweight)	Finn	80
Open skiff	49er	100
Open multihull	Tornado	80
Women's one-person dinghy	Laser Radial	120
Women's two-person dinghy	470	80
Women's keelboat	Yngling	80
Women's windsurfer	RS:X	80

== Summary ==
=== Medal table ===
Rank	Nation	Gold	Silver	Bronze	Total
1	Great Britain (GBR)	2	0	4	6
2	Australia (AUS)	2	0	2	4
3	Brazil (BRA)	2	0	0	2
3	Spain (ESP)	2	0	0	2
5	Netherlands (NED)	1	2	1	4
6	Poland (POL)	1	1	0	2
7	Belarus (BLR)	1	0	0	1
8	France (FRA)	0	2	0	2
8	New Zealand (NZL)	0	2	0	2
10	Austria (AUT)	0	1	0	1
10	Belgium (BEL)	0	1	0	1
10	Finland (FIN)	0	1	0	1
10	United States (USA)	0	1	0	1
14	Estonia (EST)	0	0	1	1
14	Germany (GER)	0	0	1	1
14	Israel (ISR)	0	0	1	1
14	Slovenia (SLO)	0	0	1	1
Totals (17 entries)		11	11	11	33

=== Event medalists ===
Event	Gold	Silver	Bronze
Men's 470	Australia; Nathan Wilmot; Malcolm Page	Netherlands; Sven Coster; Kalle Coster	Israel; Gideon Kliger; Udi Gal
Women's 470	Netherlands; Marcelien de Koning; Lobke Berkhout	France; Ingrid Petitjean; Nadège Douroux	Great Britain; Christina Bassadone; Saskia Clark
49er	Great Britain; Stevie Morrison; Ben Rhodes	Austria; Nico Delle Karth; Nikolaus Resch	Australia; Nathan Outteridge; Ben Austin
Finn	Rafael Trujillo (ESP)	Pieter-Jan Postma (NED)	Gašper Vinčec (SLO)
Laser	Tom Slingsby (AUS)	Andrew Murdoch (NZL)	Deniss Karpak (EST)
Laser Radial	Tatiana Drozdovskaya (BLR)	Sari Multala (FIN)	Petra Niemann (GER)
Men's RS:X	Ricardo Santos (BRA)	Przemysław Miarczyński (POL)	Nick Dempsey (GBR)
Women's RS:X	Zofia Klepacka (POL)	Barbara Kendall (NZL)	Jessica Crisp (AUS)
Star	Brazil; Robert Scheidt; Bruno Prada	France; Xavier Rohart; Pascal Rambeau	Great Britain; Iain Percy; Andrew Simpson
Tornado	Spain; Fernando Echávarri; Antón Paz	Belgium; Carolijn Brouwer; Sébastien Godefroid	Netherlands; Mitch Booth; Pim Nieuwenhuis
Yngling	Great Britain; Sarah Ayton; Sarah Webb; Pippa Wilson	United States; Sally Barkow; Carrie Howe; Debbie Capozzi	Great Britain; Shirley Robertson; Annie Lush; Lucy MacGregor
