= Gabrio Zandonà =

Italian sailor

Personal information
- Nationality: Italian
- Born: 11 June 1977 (age 49) Rome, Italy
- Height: 1.70 m (5 ft 7 in)
- Weight: 60 kg (132 lb)

Sailing career
- Sport: Sailing
- Club: G.S. Marina Militare
- Class: 470 class
Medal record
470 World Championships
Gold medal – first place	2003 Cádiz	470 class
Mediterranean Games
Gold medal – first place	2001 Tunis	470 class
Gold medal – first place	2005 Almeria	470 class
Gold medal – first place	2009 Pescara	470 class

Gabrio Zandonà (born 11 June 1977 in Rome) is an Italian sailor, world champion in the 470 class in 2003.

== Biography ==
In 2003 he won gold medal at 470 World Championships in Cádiz (with Andrea Trani) and in 2009 he won gold medal at the Mediterranean Games in Pescara (with Francesco Della Torre).

In his career he participated in three editions of the Olympic Games. He and team-mate Pietro Zucchetti came 4th at the 2012 Summer Olympics.

== Achievements ==
Year	Competition	Venue	Position	Event	Notes
2003	World Championships	(Spain) Cádiz	1st	470 class	
2004	Olympic Games	(Greece) Athens	10th	470 class	
2008	Olympic Games	(China) Beijing	6th	470 class	
2012	Olympic Games	(United Kingdom) London	4th	470 class	

== See also ==
- ISAF World Sailor of the Year Awards
