= Australian Sailing Hall of Fame =

The Australian Sailing Hall of Fame was established in 2017 by Australian Sailing in collaboration with the Australian National Maritime Museum. There are two nomination categories: the sailor or athlete category; and the general category which recognises those who have played a critical supporting role such as an official, coach or similar.

== Hall of Fame ==
| Name | Category | Inducted |
|---|---|---|
| The Team of Australia II | General | 2017 |
| Kay Cottee AO | Sailor | 2017 |
| Victor Kovalenko OAM | General | 2017 |
| Rolly Tasker AM | Sailor | 2017 |
| Sir Bill Northam CBE, Peter O'Donnell & James Sargeant | Sailor | 2017 |
| Jenny Armstrong OAM & Belinda Stowell OAM | Sailor | 2017 |
| Leisl Tesch OAM & Daniel Fitzgibbon AM | Sailor | 2017 |
| Syd Fischer AM OBE | Sailor | 2018 |
| Jon Sanders AO OBE CitWA | Sailor | 2018 |
| John Cuneo OAM, Tom Anderson & John Shaw | Sailor | 2018 |
| Jock Sturrock MBE | Sailor | 2018 |
| David Forbes OAM & John Anderson OAM | Sailor | 2018 |
| Mark Foy | General | 2019 |
| Magnus Halvorsen & Trygve Halvorsen | Sailor | 2019 |
| Greg Hyde | Sailor | 2019 |
| Adrienne Cahalan OAM | Sailor | 2019 |
| Noel Robins OAM, Jamie Dunross OAM & Graeme Martin OAM | Sailor | 2020 |
| Malcolm Page (sailor) OAM | Sailor | 2020 |
| Frank Bethwaite DFC OAM | General | 2020 |
| Mathew Belcher OAM | Sailor | 2022 |
| Tom King OAM & Mark Turnbull OAM | Sailor | 2022 |
| Jessica Watson OAM | Sailor | 2022 |
| Iain Murray (sailor) AM | Sailor | 2023 |
| Elise Rechichi OAM & Tessa Parkinson OAM | Sailor | 2023 |
| Tom Slingsby OAM | Sailor | 2023 |
| Jessica Crisp | Sailor | 2024 |
| Jimmy Spithill | Sailor | 2024 |
| Lindsay Cunningham AM | General | 2024 |
| Matthew Wearn OAM | Sailor | 2024 |
| Glenn Ashby MNZM | Sailor | 2025 |
| Nathan Outteridge OAM & Iain Jensen OAM | Sailor | 2025 |
