= World Sailor of the Year Awards =

The World Sailor of the Year Awards were launched in 1994 by World Sailing (formerly the International Sailing Federation) to reward individual sailors for outstanding achievements in the sport. The awards have been sponsored by Rolex since 2001.

== List of winners ==
Year	Male winner(s)	Female winner(s)
1994	(New Zealand) Peter Blake (United Kingdom) Robin Knox-Johnston	(Spain) Theresa Zabell
1995	(New Zealand) Russell Coutts	(France) Isabelle Autissier
1996	(Germany) Jochen Schümann	(Hong Kong) Lee Lai Shan
1997	(United Kingdom) Pete Goss	(Ukraine) Ruslana Taran (Ukraine) Elena Pakholchik
1998	(United Kingdom) Ben Ainslie	(Netherlands) Carolijn Brouwer
1999	(Poland) Mateusz Kusznierewicz	(Netherlands) Margriet Matthijsse
2000	(United States) Mark Reynolds (United States) Magnus Liljedahl	(United Kingdom) Shirley Robertson
2001	(Brazil) Robert Scheidt	(United Kingdom) Ellen MacArthur
2002	(United Kingdom) Ben Ainslie	(Greece) Sofia Bekatorou (Greece) Emilia Tsoulfa
2003	(New Zealand) Russell Coutts	(Norway) Siren Sundby
2004	(Brazil) Robert Scheidt	(Greece) Sofia Bekatorou (Greece) Emilia Tsoulfa
2005	(Spain) Fernando Echavarri (Spain) Anton Paz	(United Kingdom) Ellen MacArthur
2006	(New Zealand) Mike Sanderson	(United States) Paige Railey
2007	(United States) Ed Baird	(France) Claire Leroy
2008	(United Kingdom) Ben Ainslie	(Italy) Alessandra Sensini
2009	(Brazil) Torben Grael	(United States) Anna Tunnicliffe
2010	(Australia) Tom Slingsby	(Spain) Blanca Manchon
2011	(Spain) Iker Martínez (Spain) Xabier Fernández	(United States) Anna Tunnicliffe
2012	(United Kingdom) Ben Ainslie	(China) Xu Lijia
2013	(Australia) Mathew Belcher	(New Zealand) Jo Aleh (New Zealand) Polly Powrie
2014	(Australia) James Spithill	(Brazil) Martine Grael (Brazil) Kahena Kunze
2015	(New Zealand) Peter Burling (New Zealand) Blair Tuke	(United Kingdom) Sarah Ayton
2016	(Argentina) Santiago Lange	(United Kingdom) Hannah Mills (United Kingdom) Saskia Clark
2017	(New Zealand) Peter Burling	(Netherlands) Marit Bouwmeester
2018	(Cyprus) Pavlos Kontides	(Netherlands) Carolijn Brouwer (France) Marie Riou
2019	(Italy) Marco Gradoni	(Denmark) Anne-Marie Rindom
2020	not assigned	
2021	(Australia) Tom Slingsby	(United Kingdom) Hannah Mills (United Kingdom) Eilidh McIntyre
2022	(Italy) Ruggero Tita	(Italy) Caterina Banti
2023	(Australia) Tom Slingsby	(South Africa) Kirsten Neuschäfer
2024	(Spain) Diego Botin (Spain) Florian Trittel	(Netherlands) Marit Bouwmeester
2025	(France) Charlie Dalin	(Switzerland) Justine Mettraux
