= Aarnikka =

Aarnikka is a Finnish surname. Notable people with the surname include:

- Mika Aarnikka (born 1967), Finnish sailor
- Tuomo Aarnikka (born 1967), Finnish wheelchair curler
