= Club Nàutic S'Arenal =

Spanish sailing club

Coordinates: 39.499917729861465°N 2.750538300542471°E

- Burgee
- Short name: CNA
- Founded: 1952
- Location: Bay of Palma, Mallorca
- Commodore: José Ramón Picó Suñer
- Website: www.rcnb.com

The Club Nàutic S'Arenal also known as the Club Náutico El Arenal is a sailing club in the Bay of Palma on the Balearic Islands of Mallorca in a place called El Arenal.

== Description ==
The club has hosted many international events including the 2024 470 World Championships it is one of the host of club around the bay for Princess Sofia Regatta an international sailing event that hosts the Olympic classes.

At an international level it members have won world championships with podiums including:

- Gold for Xavier Antich and Pedro Terrones in 2013 420 World Championships
- Gold for Matías Bonet at the 2006 Platu 25 World Championship
- Gold for Paula Barcelo Martin was 470 Junior World Championships in 2016 and 2017 together with Silvia Mas Depares.
- Silver for José Carlos Frauen (1983) and Marc Patiño (1992) Optimist World Championship
- Silver for José Carlos Frauen at the 1985 Europe World Championships a
- Silver for Catalina and María Darder in 1989 420 World Championships;
- Bronzes for third place of José Miguel Ramis and Antonio Morro in the 1987 420 World Championships.
