= Ihor Matviienko =

Ukrainian sailor

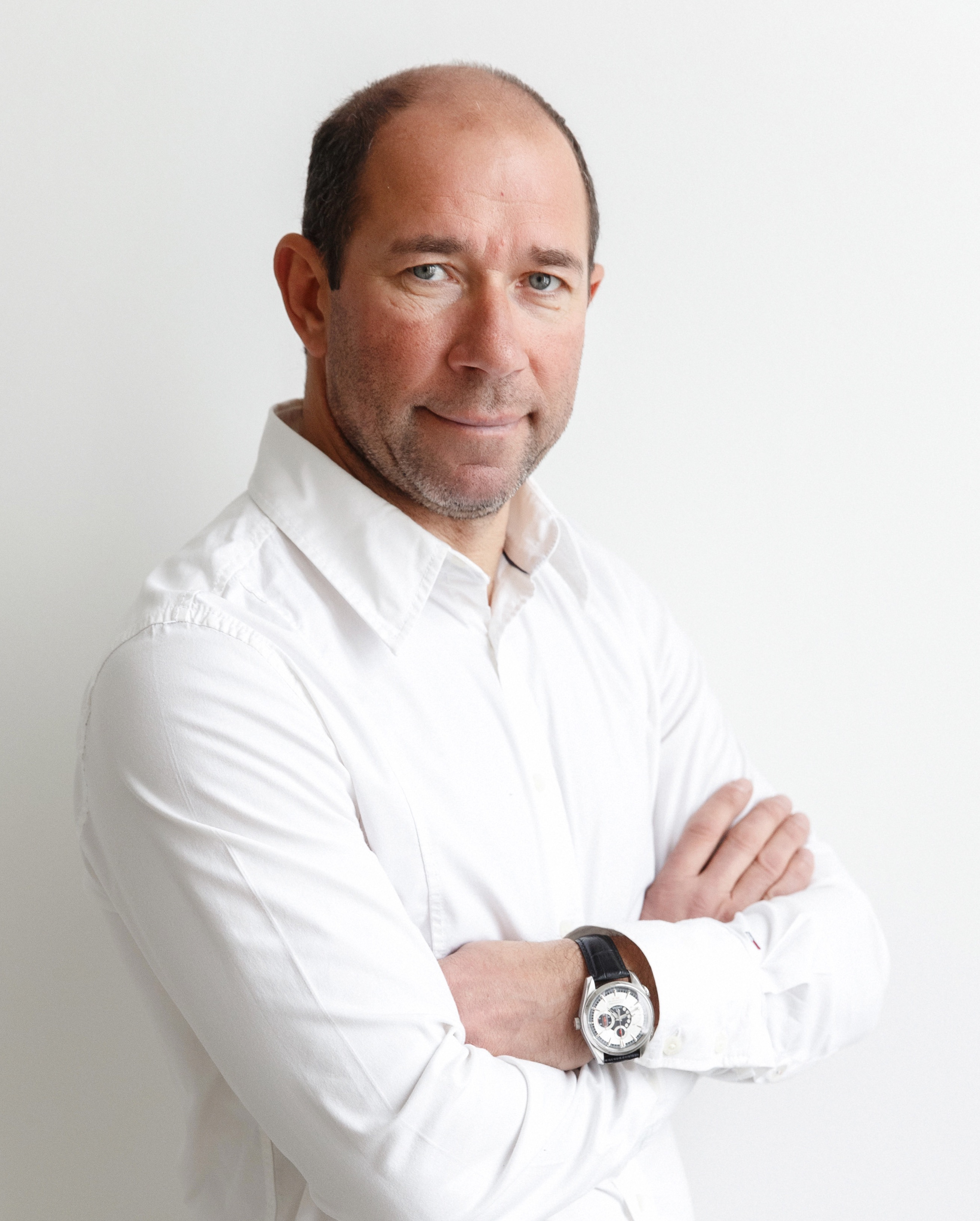

Personal information
- Native name: Ukrainian: Ігор Григорович Матвієнко
- Nationality: Ukrainian
- Citizenship: Ukraine
- Born: May 17, 1971 (age 55) Dnipro
- Occupation: yachtsman
- Height: 178 cm (5 ft 10 in)
- Weight: 77 kg (170 lb; 12 st 2 lb)

Sport
- Sport: sailing
- Coached by: Victor Kovalenko
Medal record
Olympic Games
Gold medal – first place	1996 Atlanta	470 |
World Championships
Gold medal – first place	2001 Koper	470 class
Bronze medal – third place	2000 Lake Balaton	470 class
European Championships
Gold medal – first place	2001 Dún Laoghaire	470 class
Silver medal – second place	1997 Nieuwpoort	470 class

Ihor Matviienko (born May 17, 1971 in Dnipropetrovsk, Ukrainian SSR) is a Ukrainian sailor and Olympic Champion. He won a gold medal in the 470 class at the 1996 Summer Olympics in Atlanta, together with Yevhen Braslavets. He also competed at the 2000 Summer Olympics and the 2004 Summer Olympics. Also, Matviienko is the World and European Champion in 2001. He is a President of the Sailing Federation of the Dnipro, President of 470 class association of Ukraine and Founder of sailing school and club MIR yacht club in Dnipro, Ukraine.

== Biography ==
Ihor Matviienko was born on May 17, 1971, in Dnipro, Ukrainian SSR. He graduated from the Dnipropetrovsk State Institute of Physical Culture and Sports and in 1984 he began his sailing career.

In 1988, at the Spartakiad of Peoples of the USSR, he met Evgeny Braslavets, with whom he later performed in the same crew in several competitions. In 1990, he became a member of the USSR national team in the 470 class. In 1991, he won the Spartakiad of Peoples of the USSR.

In 1996, Ihor Matviienko together with Yevhen Braslavets participated in the 26th Olympic Games in Atlanta and became Champion (Gold Medal) in 470 sailing class. Matviienko and Braslavec won the Olympics with a minimum number of penalty points and therefore entered the Guinness Book of Records in 1997.

Matviienko also participated in the 2000 Sydney Olympics and the 2004 Athens Olympics.

In 2000, he became the bronze medalist of the World Championship.

In 2001, Matviienko won gold both at the World Championships and at the European Championships.

After his Olympic career, he took part in numerous racing projects at the world level in Dragon, Transpac52, SB20 and Melges20 sailing classes. Also, he coached national and Olympic teams of Ukraine and Russia in different classes (470, Finn, catamaran, Tornado, Yngling). Together with Yevhen Braslavets, he coached the national team of Singapore in class 470 in the cycle of preparation for the Asian Games, as well as the women's crew of the Canadian national team in class 470 in the cycle of preparation for the Olympic Games in Australia.

He competed for the Ministry of Defence Sports Club of Ukraine (Dnipro).

In March 2017, Matviienko founded the MIR Racing Yacht Club in Dnipro, where are organized weekend club races, held master classes, trained to manage a yacht (adults and children), training of amateur crews to participate in regattas around the world.

Ihor Matviienko regularly organizes sailing competitions in Dnipro, develops children's yachting.

Since 2019, he is the President of the Sailing Federation of Dnipro.

In July 2020, Ihor Matviienko organized the Double-Handed Sailing Championship of Ukraine. Teams from Dnipro, Cherkasy, and Odesa took part in the championship.

In August 2020, Matviienko initiated the Nikopol Cup regatta. The competition was held in the fleet of the MIR Yacht Club.

In May 2021 by the initiative of Matviienko and with the support of the city council the Sailing Federation of Dnipro, together with the MIR yacht-club, held the "Dnipro Open Championship". Apart from teams from Dnipro and Dnipropetrovsk region, the participants from Zaporizhzhia, Nikopol, Nova Kakhovka, and Energodar were invited to the championship.

In 2021, Matvienko initiated Dnipro's first Open Sailing Championship for children and youth from 7 to 16 years old "Sails of Dnipro" ("Sails of the Dnipro").

Since the beginning of Russia's full-scale invasion of Ukraine, Ihor Matviienko called on Russian and Belarusian athletes to oppose their governments.

In July 2022, Matviienko was assigned as a Captain of RC44 class Ukrainian Gaidamaki sailing crew and won the SSL GOLD CUP World Cup qualification.

In June 2023, Ihor Matviienko won a bronze medal as a crew member of the Israeli sailing team at the 12th International Ledro Match Race in Italy.

In 2023 he opened a sailing school for children and adults in Limassol, Cyprus, and is active in coaching and educational activities dedicated to sailing skills and knowledge training and promotion.

== Philanthropy ==
On May 18, 2021, a charity regatta was organized to mark the anniversary of Igor Matviienko. The funds raised were used to launch a children's sailing school in Dnipro.

== Awards and achievements ==
Among Matviienko's awards and achievements are the following:

- 1996 — Ukrainian Presidential Insignia “For Courage”
- 1996 — Olympic Champion, Atlanta, USA
- 2001 — World Champion
- 2001 — European Champion
- 2009 — 4th place in the World Championship, Transpac52
- 2010 — 6th place Med Cup, Transpac52
- 2011 — Bronze Medalist at the World Championship, Transpac52
- 2013 — Silver Medalist at the World Championship, SB20
- 2015 — Silver Medalist at the World Championship, SB20
- 2016 — PrimaCup winner, Melges20

== Statistics ==
=== 470 ===
Yevhen Braslavets as helmsman, Evgeniy Anatolyevich and Victor Kovalenko as coach:

Competition/Year	1996	2000	2001	2004
Summer Olympic Games	1	6	-	9
470 World Championships	-	3	1	-
