= Mathew Belcher =

Australian sailor (born 1982)

Personal information
- Born: 20 September 1982 (age 43) Gold Coast, Queensland
- Height: 173 cm (5 ft 8 in)
- Weight: 62 kg (9 st 11 lb; 137 lb)

Sailing career
- Sport: Sailing
- Coached by: Victor Kovalenko
- Class: 420, 470
Medal record
Sailing
Representing Australia
Olympic Games
Gold medal – first place	2012 London	470 class
Gold medal – first place	2020 Tokyo	470 class
Silver medal – second place	2016 Rio de Janeiro	470 class
World Championships
Gold medal – first place	2000 La Rochelle	420
Gold medal – first place	2010 The Hague	470
Gold medal – first place	2011 Perth	470
Gold medal – first place	2012 Barcelona	470
Gold medal – first place	2013 La Rochelle	470
Gold medal – first place	2014 Santander	470
Gold medal – first place	2015 Haifa	470
Gold medal – first place	2017 Thessaloniki	470
Gold medal – first place	2018 Brisbane	Etchells
Gold medal – first place	2019 Enoshima	470
Bronze medal – third place	2016 San Isidro	470
- Updated on December 2016

Mathew "Mat" Belcher, OAM (born 20 September 1982) is an Australian sailor and a two-time Olympic gold medalist in the 470 dinghy, who currently competes with crew Will Ryan. In 2011, following World Championship and World Cup success, he and Malcolm Page were shortlisted by the International Sailing Federation for the ISAF World Sailor of the Year Awards. Belcher was selected as the Australian flag bearer for the closing ceremony of the 2020 Summer Olympics after winning a second gold medal and third successive medal in the 470 class.

Belcher is considered the most successful Australian Olympic sailor in history, with two gold medals, one silver, and ten world titles to his name.

== Earlier years ==
Mathew grew up on the Gold Coast, Queensland and therefore was always surrounded by water. He was only six years old when he started sailing in a 10-year-old Sabot (dinghy) tied to the back of his parents' boat.

In 1989 at the age of seven Mathew competed in his first race at the Southport Yacht Club.

== Sailing career ==
Having won the 420 World Championship in 2000, the feeder class to the 470, while still conducting his school at The Southport School on the Gold Coast, Belcher was given the distinction of carrying the Olympic flag during the closing ceremony of the 2000 Summer Olympics. At that point, he decided to pursue his dream of becoming an Olympian. Coach Victor Kovalenko invited him to join the Australian 470 sailing squad, where he served as the tuning partner for Nathan Wilmot and Malcolm Page. As a helmsman, Belcher rose to the #1 ISAF ranking in 2007 but did not qualify for the 2008 Olympics, as Wilmot and Page won the 470 World Championship and went on to represent Australia at the 2008 Summer Olympics in Beijing. He now lives in Palm Beach Gold Coast with his family.

== Olympic Games ==
Together with 2008 Olympic gold medalist Malcolm Page, Belcher won the gold medal at the 2012 Summer Olympics in London in the 470 class. Together with Will Ryan, Belcher was runner up in the 2016 Rio Olympics, winning the silver medal in the 470 class. In the 2020 Tokyo Olympics, Belcher and Ryan won the gold medal in the 470 class.

In October 2022 Belcher announced his retirement from Olympic sailing and will serve as CEO of Zhik, a sailing clothing company.

== Recognition ==
2012 – Australian Sailing Awards – Male Sailor of the Year (with Malcolm Page)

2013 – Australian Sailing Awards – Male Sailor of the Year (with Will Ryan)

2013 – Australian Institute of Sport Awards – Team of the Year (with Will Ryan)

2014 – Australian Sailing Awards – Male Sailor of the Year (with Will Ryan)

2015 – Australian Sailing Awards – Male Sailor of the Year (with Will Ryan)

2019 – Australian Sailing Awards – Male Sailor of the Year (with Will Ryan)

2019 – Australian Institute of Sport Awards – Team of the Year (with Will Ryan)

2021 – Australian Sailing Awards – Male Sailor of the Year (with Will Ryan)

2022 – Australian Sailing Hall of Fame
