= Katrin Adlkofer =

German sailor (born 1966)

Katrin Adlkofer or Kathrin Adlkofer (born 5 September 1966 in Munich) is a German sailor.

Together with Susanne Bauckholt she won the world championship in the 470 in 1987 and 1989. They also and competed at 1988 and 1996 Olympics, finishing fifth each time.
