= Nicola Birkner =

German sailor

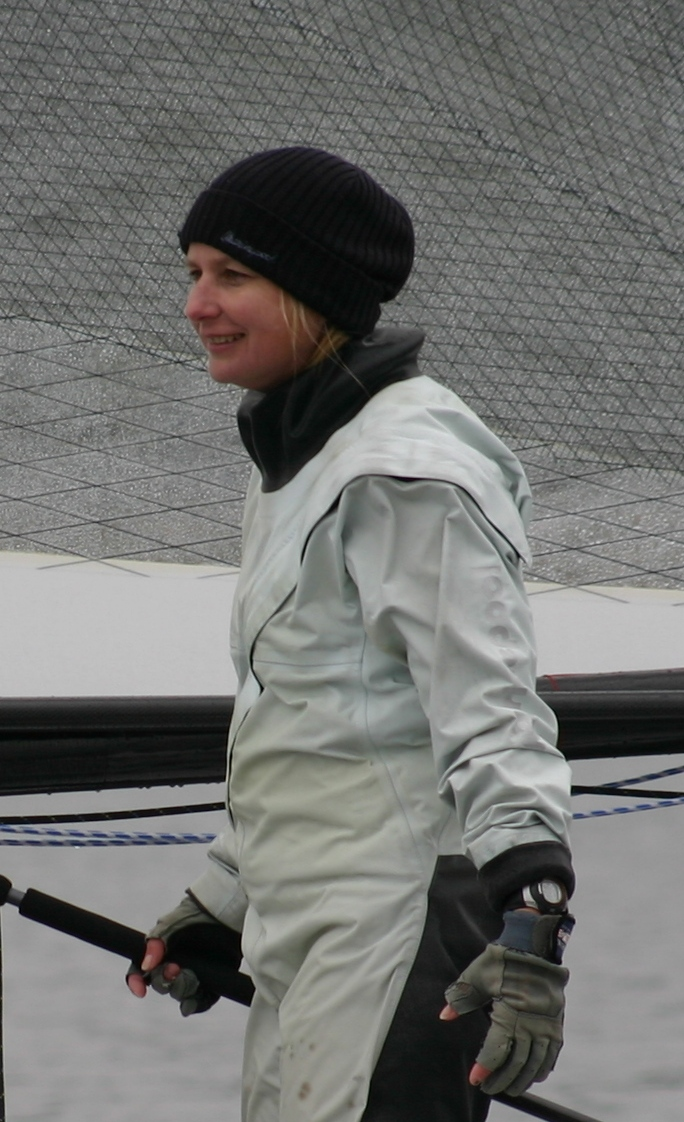
- Birkner in 2010

Personal information
- Nationality: German
- Born: 7 December 1969 (age 56) Berlin, Germany
- Height: 161 cm (5 ft 3 in)
- Weight: 51 kg (112 lb)

Sailing career
- Sport: Sailing
- Club: Verein Seglerhaus am Wannsee
- Class(es): 470, 505 (dinghy)

Nicola Birkner (born 7 December 1969 in Berlin) is a German sailor. Together with Wibke Bülle she competed at the 2000 Olympics finishing fifth.
