= Gašper Vinčec =

Slovenian sailor (born 1981)

Personal information
- Nationality: Slovenian
- Born: 5 April 1981 (age 45) Koper, SR Slovenia, SFR Yugoslavia
- Height: 1.86 m (6 ft 1 in)
- Weight: 93 kg (205 lb)

Sailing career
- Sport: Sailing
- Club: JD Finn Sloveija
- Coached by: Roman Teply
- Class: Dinghy
Medal record
Men's sailing
Representing Slovenia
World Championships
Bronze medal – third place	2007 Cascais	Finn

Gašper Vinčec (born 5 April 1981) is a Slovenian former sailor, who specialized in the Finn class. He represented his country Slovenia in two editions of the Summer Olympic Games (2004 and 2008) and came closest to the medal haul in the final race of his signature fleet, finishing in seventh place. Outside his Olympic career, Vinčec picked up a bronze at the 2007 ISAF Worlds in Cascais, Portugal, becoming the first Slovenian sailor to ascend the podium since the breakup of SFR Yugoslavia. A member of the country's Finn yacht club (Slovene: JD Finn Slovenija), Vinčec trained most of his competitive sporting career under the tutelage of his personal coach Roman Teply.

Vinčec made his Olympic debut in Athens 2004, sailing in the Finn class. There, he accumulated a net grade of 151 points to obtain the lowly twentieth overall spot out of 25 entrants at the end of the eleven-race series.

At the 2008 Summer Olympics in Beijing, Vinčec qualified for his second Slovenian team in the open Finn class. Building up his Olympic selection, he picked up a bronze at the 2007 ISAF Worlds in Cascais, Portugal to lock the country's top Finn berth for the Games. A potential medal favorite, Vinčec entered the final race with a myriad of top-ten marks over the past eight legs. A costly penalty on the run, however, effectively pushed Vinčec towards the back of the fleet, slipping him out of the podium to seventh overall with 72 net points.

Vinčec sought to bid for his third consecutive trip to the Games in both London 2012 and Rio 2016, but he lost twice in a series of domestic selection regattas to multiple-time medalist Vasilij Žbogar.
