= David Ullman =

American sailor

Sailing career
- Sport: Sailing
- Club: Balboa Yacht Club
- Classes: 470, Melges 24, Snipe, Lido 14, Thistle, Sabot, Coronado 15

David Ullman (born 1946) is an international yachtsman, sailboat racer, and sailmaker. Ullman founded Ullman Sails in Newport Beach, California in 1967.

He won the 470 World Championships in 1977, 1978 and 1980, and the Melges 24 World Championships in 2007.

He also won the National Championships in Lido 14 (eight times), Snipe (1973), Thistle, Sabot and Coronado 15.

Besides, Ullman won the gold medal in Snipe at the 1975 Pan American Games and in 1980, the Championship of champions (Jack Brown Trophy) and the U.S. Men’s National Championship (Mallory Cup) He is also a five times (1992-1996) winner of the Sir Thomas Lipton Challenge Cup.

Ullman has also won races in the S.O.R.C. class, and is a U.S. Team Racing champion. He formerly coached the U.S. Olympic Sailing Team. Ullman continues to race and coach, and is active in running his international sailmaking business.

== Awards ==
Ullman was named US Sailor of the Year in 1996, and was nominated again in 2007. He was inducted into the National Sailing Hall of Fame in 2016.

== Publications ==
- Championship Dinghy Sailing (1978), with Christopher Caswell
