= Susanne Bauckholt =

German sailor (born 1965)

Susanne Bauckholt (née Meyer; born 24 September 1965 in Berlin) is a German sailor.

Together with Katrin Adlkofer she won the World Championship in the 470 in 1987 and 1989. They also and competed at 1988 and 1996 Olympics, finishing fifth each time.
