= Gideon Kliger =

Israeli sailor

Gideon Kliger גדעון קליגר
Personal information
- Nickname: Gidi
- Born: March 30, 1980 (age 46) Tel Aviv, Israel
- Height: 5 ft 7 in (170 cm)
- Weight: 132 lb (60 kg)

Sailing career
- Sport: Sailing
- Coached by: Ilan Basik-Tashtash
- Class: Men's 470-Class Two-Person Dinghy
Medal record
Men's sailing
Representing Israel
470 World Championships
| Bronze medal – third place | 2006 Rizhao | Men's 470 |
| Bronze medal – third place | 2007 Cascais | Men's 470 |
| Bronze medal – third place | 2008 Mordialloc | Men's 470 |

Gideon "Gidi" Kliger (Hebrew: גדעון "גידי" קליגר; born March 30, 1980) is an Israeli Olympic sailor, who is a three-time bronze medallist at the sailing world championships.

== Biography ==
Kliger was born in Tel Aviv, Israel. He started sailing and competing when he was 8 years old. He competes with the club Hapoel Tel Aviv. He competed with partner Udi Gal in two-man competitions through 2009.

In 1996 he and Gal won the 420 Europeans and finished second place at the 420 Worlds. In 2000 he and Gal won the 470 Youth World Championship, and in 2001 they finished second place in the European Championship in Ireland.

He and Gal won bronze medals in the Sailing 470 World Championship for three years straight in Men's 470-Class Two-Person Dinghy — from 2006 to 2008. In May 2003, he was ranked number 1 in the world. In June 2007, he came in third place in the Men's 470 ISAF Sailing World Championships, in Cascais, Portugal. In January 2008, he and partner Gal came in third place in the Men 470 World Championships, in Melbourne, Australia. In April 2008, the pair was ranked third in the world in the 470 class dinghy.

Kliger and Gal competed on behalf of Israel at the 2004 Summer Olympics in Sailing at the 2004 Summer Olympics in Athens, Greece, and on behalf of Israel at the 2008 Summer Olympics in Sailing at the 2008 Summer Olympics in Beijing, China, in Men's 470-Class Two-Person Dinghy, coming in 15th and 14th place, respectively.

In 2009, Kliger began partnering with Israeli Eran Sela, a windsurfer from Sdot Yam, in the 470. In 2010, Kliger was ranked the # 2 skipper in the 470 by ISAF. In September 2010, they won a silver medal at the 470 class European Championship in Istanbul. In November 2010, the two won the gold medal in the Men's 470 at the Perth International Regatta. They won a bronze medal at the Open 470 European Championships. In 2011, they came in 4th place at the 470 World Championship, and in 7th at the 2012 World Championship.

In 2012, Kliger and Sela also competed at the 2012 Summer Olympics, finishing in 15th place.

In 2013 Kliger started coaching and sailing owner driver classes as Dragon, J70 and J80.

== Coaching ==
From 2013 until 2018 Kliger have been coaching the 470 class in the Swedish Sailing Team. Coaching Anton Dahlberg and Fredrik Bergström in the 2016 Summer Olympic Games in Rio.

From 2018 until 2021 Kliger has been coaching the 470 class in the Royal Spanish Sailing Federation. Coaching Jordi Xammar and Nicolás Rodríguez winning an Olympic bronze medal at the 2020 Summer Olympic Games in Tokyo
