= Yevhen Braslavets =

Ukrainian sailor (born 1972)

Medal record

Sailing

Representing Ukraine

Olympic Games
Gold medal – first place	1996 Atlanta	470 class

World Championships
Gold medal – first place	2001 Koper	470 class
Bronze medal – third place	2000 Lake Balaton	470 class

European Championships
Gold medal – first place	2001 Dún Laoghaire	470 class
Silver medal – second place	1997 Nieuwpoort	470 class

Yevhen Anatoliyovych Braslavets (Ukrainian: Євген Анатолійович Браславець; born 11 September 1972 in Dnipropetrovsk, Ukrainian SSR) is a Ukrainian sailor and Olympic champion.

He won a gold medal in the 470 class at the 1996 Summer Olympics in Atlanta, together with Ihor Matviyenko.

Graduated from the Dnipropetrovsk State Institute of Physical Culture and Sports (2001). World and European champion (2001). Champion of the XXVI Olympic Games (1996) in the 470 yacht class (skipper — Matvienko I. G.). He competes for the Meteor Sports Club (Dnipro). Coaches: Kareta (Pashutina) I. L., Kovalenko V. V., Mayorov V. A.
