= Rolf Schmidt =

German sailor

Personal information
- Nationality: German
- Born: 31 October 1963 (age 62) West Berlin, West Germany

Sport
- Sport: Sailing

Rolf Schmidt (born 31 October 1963) is a German sailor. He competed in the men's 470 event at the 1992 Summer Olympics.
