= Nora Brugman =

Spanish sailor (born 1992)

Personal information
- Full name: Nora Brugman Cabot
- Nationality: Spain
- Born: 31 January 1992 (age 34) Barcelona, Spain

Sailing career
- Sport: Sailing
- Club: Club de Vela Blanes
- Class: 470
Medal record
Sailing
Representing Spain
World Championships
Gold medal – first place	2024 S'Arenal	470
Silver medal – second place	2022 Sdot Yam	470
European Championships
Gold medal – first place	2024 Cannes	470
Silver medal – second place	2022 Çeşme	470

Nora Brugman Cabot (born 31 January 1992) is a Spanish sailor who competes in the 470 category. Between 2016 and 2020, Brugman competed under the United States banner before she reverted to Spain.

== Career ==
Brugman's parents were professional athletes. Her mother Mercè Cabot was a competitive skier, while her father, Daniel Brugman, born in Boston, was an ice hockey player at CG Puigcerdà. As she began to have a passion for water sports, Brugman started practicing sailing when she was 4 years old.

At the beginning of 2016, Brugman formed a duo with Sofía Toro with the aim of qualifying for the 2016 Summer Olympics in Rio de Janeiro that same year, which they did not qualify. That same summer, after graduating in Advertising and Public Relations at Pompeu Fabra University in Barcelona, she left to live in the United States. She started the new Olympic cycle competing under the American flag, but she also failed to qualify for Tokyo 2020. The 2020 Games would be the last with the 470 class divided by gender, moving to have a single mixed category from 2024. Jordi Xammar, with whom they have known each other since childhood, and who had just won the Olympic bronze medal in Tokyo, offered to form a tandem with Brugman. In 2022 they won the silver medals in the World and European Championships, and by 2024 they won the gold medal in both of these aforementioned championships. As a result, the Catalan duo qualified for the 2024 Summer Olympics.
