= Ben Kouwenhoven =

Dutch sailor (born 1965)

Personal information
- Full name: Ben Kouwenhoven
- Nationality: Dutch
- Born: 16 November 1965 (age 60) Sneek
- Height: 1.86 m (6.1 ft)

Sport

Sailing career
- Class(es): 470, 49er
Competition record
Representing Netherlands
Olympic Games
1992 Barcelona	Men's 470
1996 Savannah	Men's 470
- Updated on 19 February 2014

Ben Kouwenhoven (born 16 November 1965, in Sneek) is a sailor from the Netherlands, who represented his country at the 1992 Summer Olympics in Barcelona. Kouwenhoven as helmsman in the Dutch Men's 470 with his twin brother Jan Kouwenhoven as crew took the 16th place. In 1996 Kouwenhoven returned to the Olympics in Savannah, Georgia. Again with his brother, Kouwenhoven took 24th place in the Men's 470.
