= Roger Surmin =

French yacht racer

Roger Surmin (born 29 November 1946) is a French yacht racer who competed in the 1976 Summer Olympics.
