= Jan Kouwenhoven =

Dutch sailor (born 1965)

Personal information
- Full name: Jan Kouwenhoven
- Nationality: Dutch
- Born: 16 November 1965 (age 60) Sneek
- Height: 1.87 m (6.1 ft)

Sport

Sailing career
- Class: 470
Competition record
Representing Netherlands
Olympic Games
1992 Barcelona	Men's 470
1996 Savannah	Men's 470
- Updated on 2014-02-01

Jan Kouwenhoven (born 16 November 1965 in Sneek) is a sailor from the Netherlands, who represented his country at the 1992 Summer Olympics in Barcelona. Kouwenhoven as crew in the Dutch Men's 470 with his twin brother Ben Kouwenhoven as helmsman took the 16th place. In 1996 Kouwenhoven returned to the Olympics in Savannah, Georgia. Again with his brother, Kouwenhoven took 24th place in the Men's 470.

== Professional life ==
Kouwenhoven holds a Bachelor's degree in Business/Managerial Economics at the Noordelijke Hogeschool Leeuwarden, Leeuwarden. Nowadays Kouwenhoven is account manager for Croon Elektrotechniek (2003 – Present).
