= Nicolas le Berre =

French yacht racer (born 1976)

Nicolas le Berre (born 6 October 1976) is a French yacht racer who competed in the 2004 Summer Olympics.
