= Wibke Bülle =

German sailor

Personal information
- Nationality: German
- Born: 14 March 1970 (age 56) Grevesmühlen, Germany
- Height: 180 cm (5 ft 11 in)
- Weight: 71 kg (157 lb)

Sailing career
- Sport: Sailing
- Classes: 470, Yngling
Medal record
Sailing World Championships
Silver medal – second place	2003 Cádiz	Yngling, women
470 World Championships
Silver medal – second place	1997 Tel Aviv	470, women
Bronze medal – third place	1991 Brisbane	470, women
Bronze medal – third place	1996 Porto Alegre	470, women
Bronze medal – third place	1998 El Arenal	470, women

Wibke Bülle (also spelled Buelle, born 14 March 1970) is a German former sailor. She competed in the women's 470 event at the 2000 Summer Olympics.
