= Saskia Clark =

British sailor (born 1979)

Saskia Clark MBE
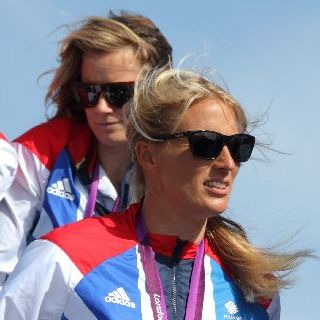
- Hannah Mills and Clark in 2012

Personal information
- Born: 23 August 1979 (age 46) Colchester, Essex, UK

Sailing career
- Sport: Sailing
- Classes: Optimist; 470
Medal record
Sailing
Representing Great Britain
Olympic Games
Gold medal – first place	2016 Rio de Janeiro	Women's 470
Silver medal – second place	2012 London	Women's 470
World Championships
Gold medal – first place	2012 Barcelona	Women's 470
Silver medal – second place	2005 San Francisco	Women's 470
Silver medal – second place	2011 Perth	Women's 470
Silver medal – second place	2015 Haifa	Women's 470
Bronze medal – third place	2007 Cascais	Women's 470
Bronze medal – third place	2014 Santander	Women's 470
European Championships
Silver medal – second place	2014 Greece	Women's 470

Saskia Clark (born 23 August 1979 in Colchester, Essex) is a British sailor and Olympic gold medalist. She competed in the 2008 Summer Olympics and she was selected, along with Hannah Mills, to sail in the women's 470 event for Team GB. They went on to win silver at the 2012 Olympics and a gold medal at the 2016 Olympics.

== Life ==
From Colchester, Essex, Clark started sailing at Dabchicks Sailing Club in an Optimist when she was eighth years old.

She came sixth in the 2008 Summer Olympics sailing in the 470 class with Christina Bassadone. She was set to sail with Sarah Ayton in the 2012 Summer Olympics, but Ayton retired to focus on her family life. Clark was then paired with Hannah Mills.

At the 2011 Skandia Sail for Gold Regatta and the 2011 Weymouth & Portland International Regatta, Clark won a silver medal in the women's 470 event together with Mills. At the 2012 470 World Championships in Barcelona, Mills and Clark claimed gold despite having suffered a black flag disqualification in the very first race of the championships.

Saskia was awarded an Honorary MSc in 2013 and an Honorary Doctorate in 2017 by the University of Chichester.

Clark was appointed Member of the Order of the British Empire (MBE) in the 2017 New Year Honours for services to sailing.
