= Federica Salvà =

Italian yacht racer

Federica Salvà (born 7 October 1971) is an Italian yacht racer who competed in the 470 class together with Emanuela Sossi in 1996 Summer Olympics and in the 2000 Summer Olympics.

Born in Rovereto, Salvà represented Circolo Velico Brenzone.
