= Henrik Wallin (sailor) =

Swedish sailor

Personal information
- Nationality: Swedish
- Born: 4 March 1969 (age 56); Gothenburg, Sweden

Sport
- Sport: Sailing

Henrik Wallin (born 4 March 1969) is a Swedish sailor. He competed in the men's 470 event at the 1996 Summer Olympics.
