= Alexandre Guyader =

French windsurfer

Personal information
- Nationality: French
- Born: 1 March 1981 (age 44)

Sport
- Sport: Windsurfing

Alexandre Guyader (born 1 March 1981) is a French windsurfer. He competed in the men's Mistral One Design event at the 2000 Summer Olympics.
