= Tessa Parkinson =

Australian sailor (born 1986)

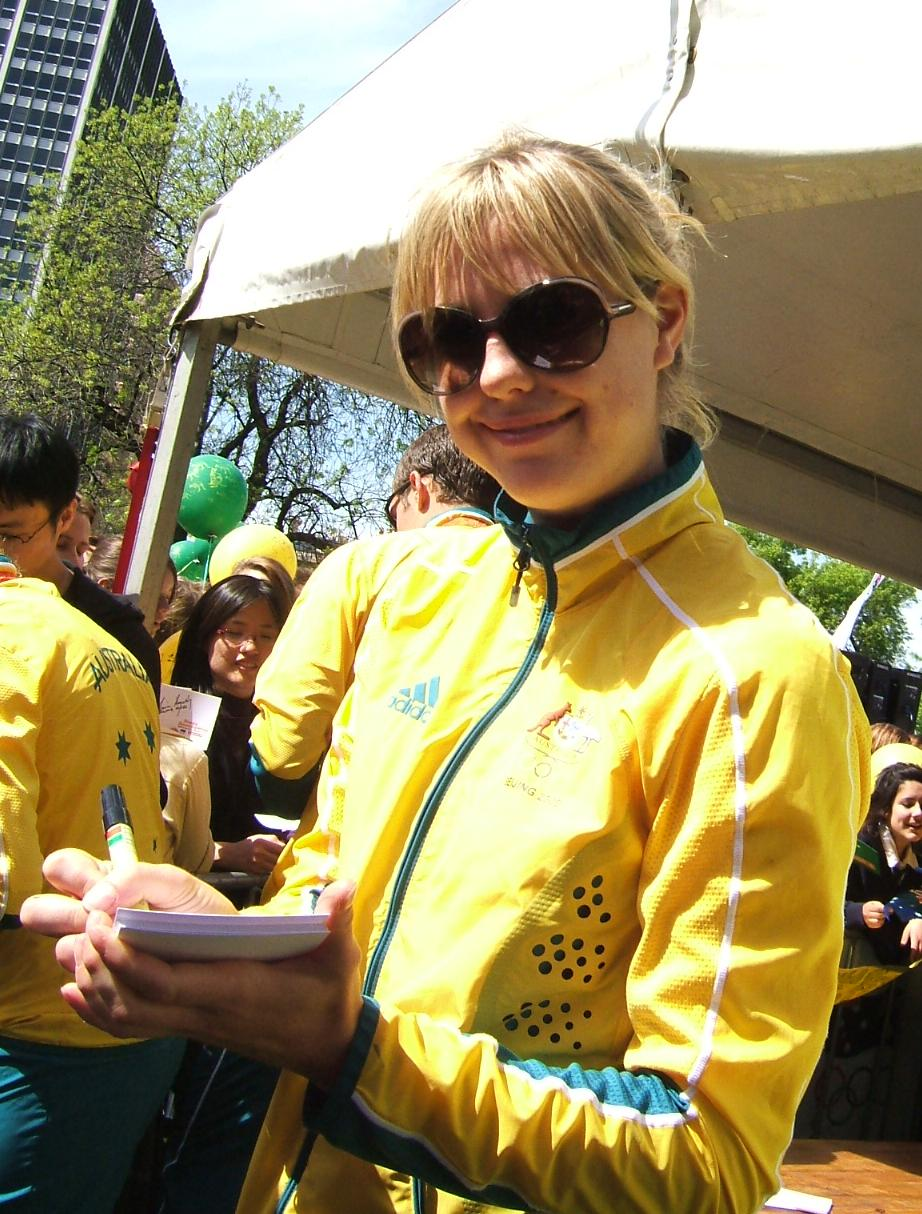
- Parkinson in 2008

Personal information
- Born: 22 September 1986 (age 39) Perth, Western Australia

Sailing career
- Sport: Sailing
Medal record
Women's sailing
Representing Australia
Olympic Games
Gold medal – first place	2008 Beijing	Women's 470 class

Tessa Parkinson OAM (born 22 September 1986) is an Australian sailor from Perth, Western Australia. Parkinson and skipper Elise Rechichi represented Australia in the 470 class at the 2008 Summer Olympics in Qingdao, China, winning the gold medal. She was an Australian Institute of Sport scholarship holder.

In 2023 Parkinson and Rechichi were inducted as a team into the Australian Sailing Hall of Fame.
