= Peggy Hardwiger =

German sailor

Personal information
- Nationality: German
- Born: 15 November 1967 (age 59) East Berlin, East Germany

Sport
- Sport: Sailing

Peggy Hardwiger (born 15 November 1967) is a German sailor. She competed in the women's 470 event at the 1992 Summer Olympics.
