= Sébastien Godefroid =

Belgian sailor (born 1971)

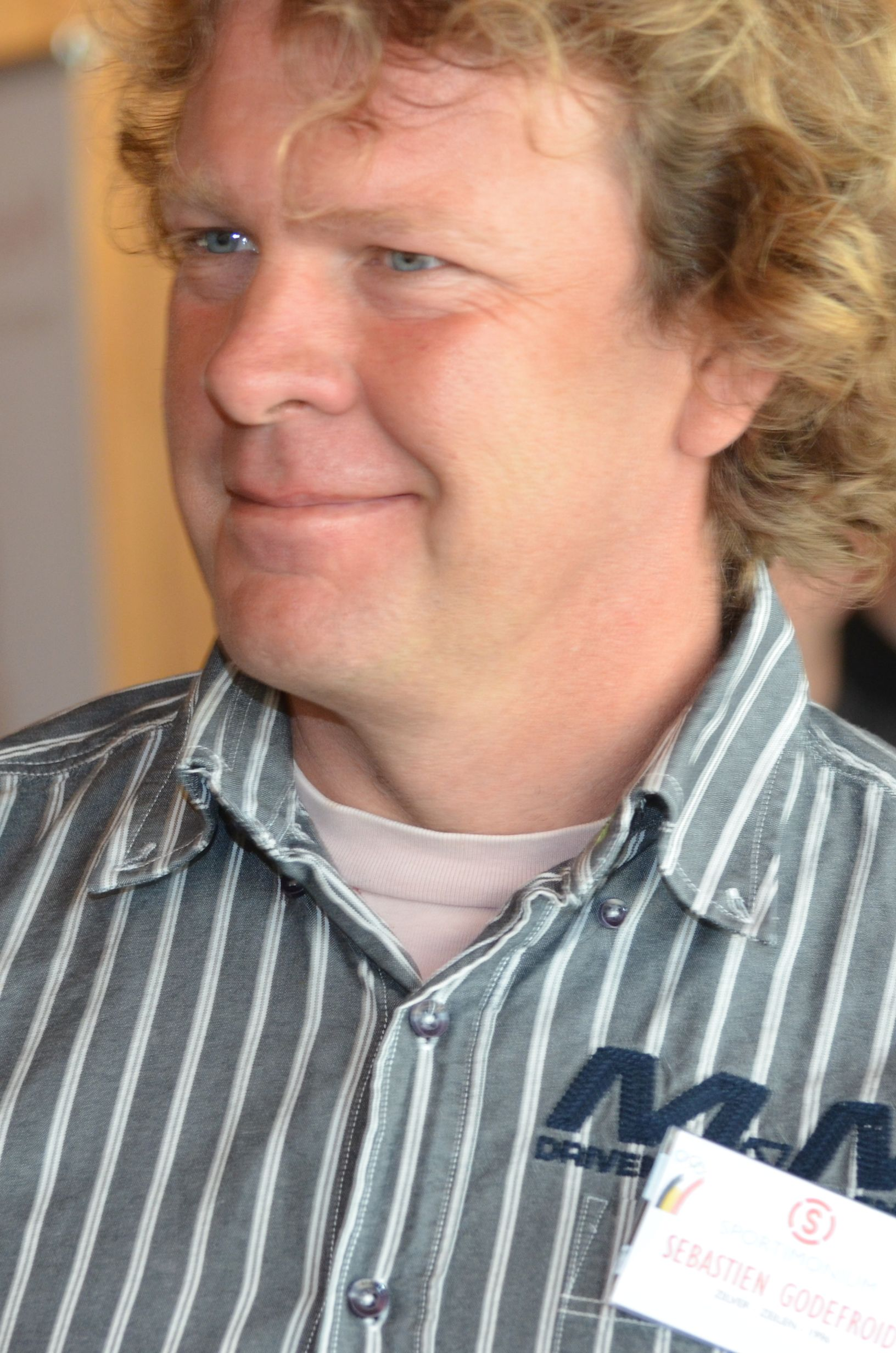

Medal record

Men's sailing

Representing Belgium

Olympic Games
Silver medal – second place	1996 Atlanta	Finn class

Sébastien "Sebbe" Godefroid (born 19 March 1971) is a Belgian sailor.

He won a silver medal in sailing at the 1996 Summer Olympics in Atlanta. He also competed at the 2000, 2004 and 2008 Olympics, but has not won another medal. He placed 7th in both the 2000 and 2004 Summer Olympics. At the 2008 Summer Olympics, he was the Belgian flag bearer during the opening ceremony. He ultimately placed 12th alongside his helmsman Carolijn Brouwer in the Tornado-class.

== Results ==
- 1996: 3rd European Championship Finn
- 1996: 2nd Olympic Games Atlanta Finn
- 1998: 1st European Championship Finn
- 2000: 2nd World Championship Finn
- 2000: 7th Olympic Games Sidney Finn
- 2001: 3rd European Championship Finn
- 2001: 1st World Championship Finn
- 2004: 7th Olympic Games Athens Finn
- 2007: 2nd World Championship Tornado (with Carolijn Brouwer)
- 2008: 12th Olympic Games Beijing Tornado (with Carolijn Brouwer)
- 2016: 1st Belgian Championship Finn
