= Paul Brotherton =

British sailor

Personal information
- Nationality: British
- Born: 11 July 1966 (age 58); Oldham, England

Sport
- Sport: Sailing

Paul Brotherton (born 11 July 1966) is a British sailor. He competed in the men's 470 event at the 1992 Summer Olympics.
