= Dimas Wood =

Spanish sailor

Personal information
- Full name: Dimas Wood Valdivielso
- Born: 25 March 1976 (age 50) Las Palmas, Spain
- Height: 178 cm (5 ft 10 in)
- Weight: 73 kg (161 lb)

Sport
- Country: Spain
- Sport: Sailing

Dimas Wood Valdivielso (Note: In this Spanish name, the first or paternal surname is Wood and the second or maternal family name is Valdivielso.) (born 25 March 1976) is a Spanish sailor. He competed in the men's 470 event at the 2004 Summer Olympics.
