= Jessica Crisp =

Australian windsurfer

Jessica Crisp (born 19 September 1969) is an Australian windsurfer currently living in Sydney, Australia. She represented Australia at the 1984 Los Angeles Olympics when windsurfing was a demonstration sport. In 1993 and 1994 she won the Professional Windsurfers Association world title. She then represented Australia at the 2000 Sydney / 5th, 2004 Athens / 6th, 2008 Beijing / 5th and 2012 London Olympic Games / 11th. She was an Australian Institute of Sport scholarship holder.

In 2024 Crisp was inducted into the Australian Sailing Hall of Fame.
