= Mika Aarnikka =

Finnish sailor

Personal information
- Nationality: Finnish
- Born: 6 October 1967 (age 57); Helsinki, Finland
- Height: 1.87 m (6 ft 2 in)
- Weight: 76 kg (168 lb)

Mika Lauri Aarnikka (born 6 October 1967) is a Finnish sailor and sales executive. He competed in multiple sailing events at the 1992 and 1996 Summer Olympics.

He is head of sales and partners at Tietoevry Connect, the cloud services and infrastructure solutions division of Tietoevry, a Finnish IT software and service company, and was formerly Finland manager for Huawei Enterprise Business Group, a division of Huawei.
