= Bay of Palma =

Bay in Mallorca, Spain

Coordinates: 39.48°N 2.64°E

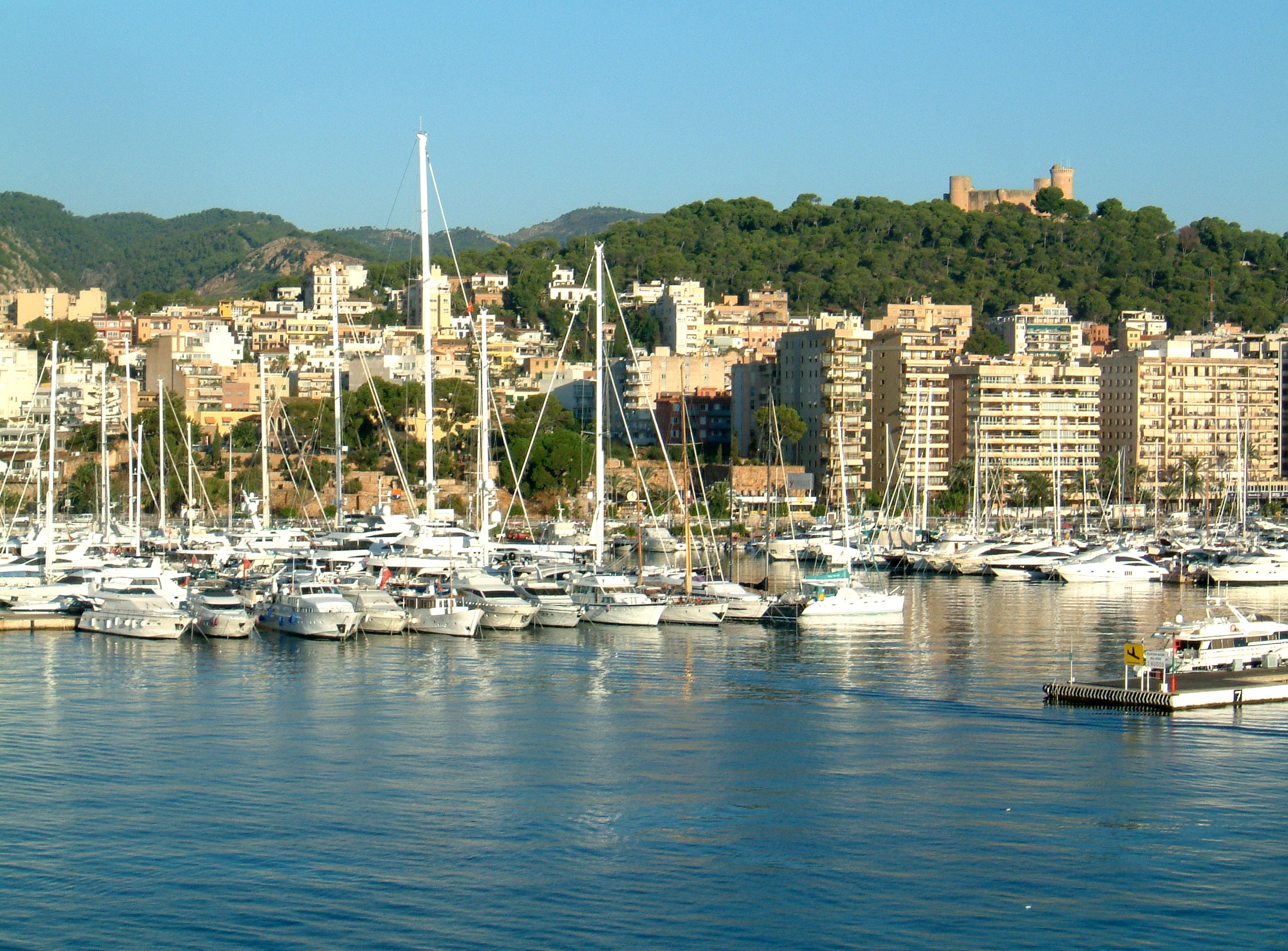
Harbour of Palma, located within the bay

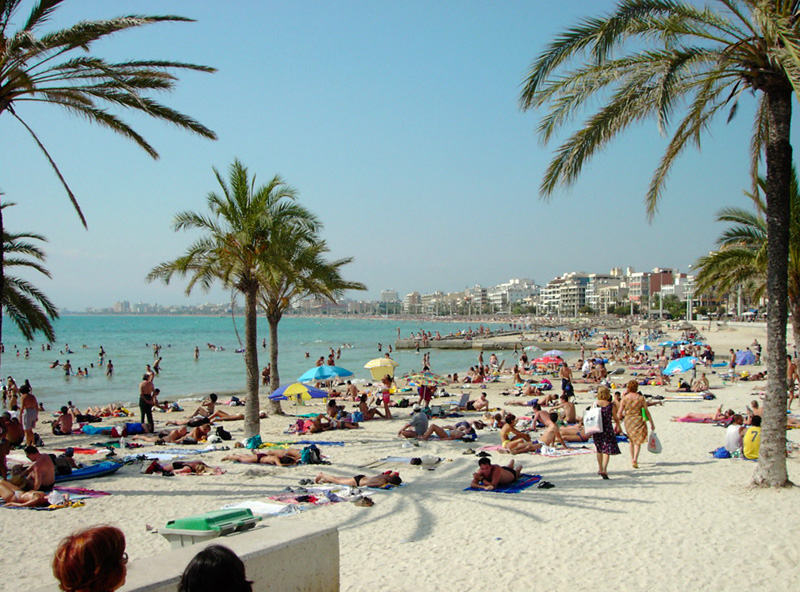
Palma Beach, located within the bay

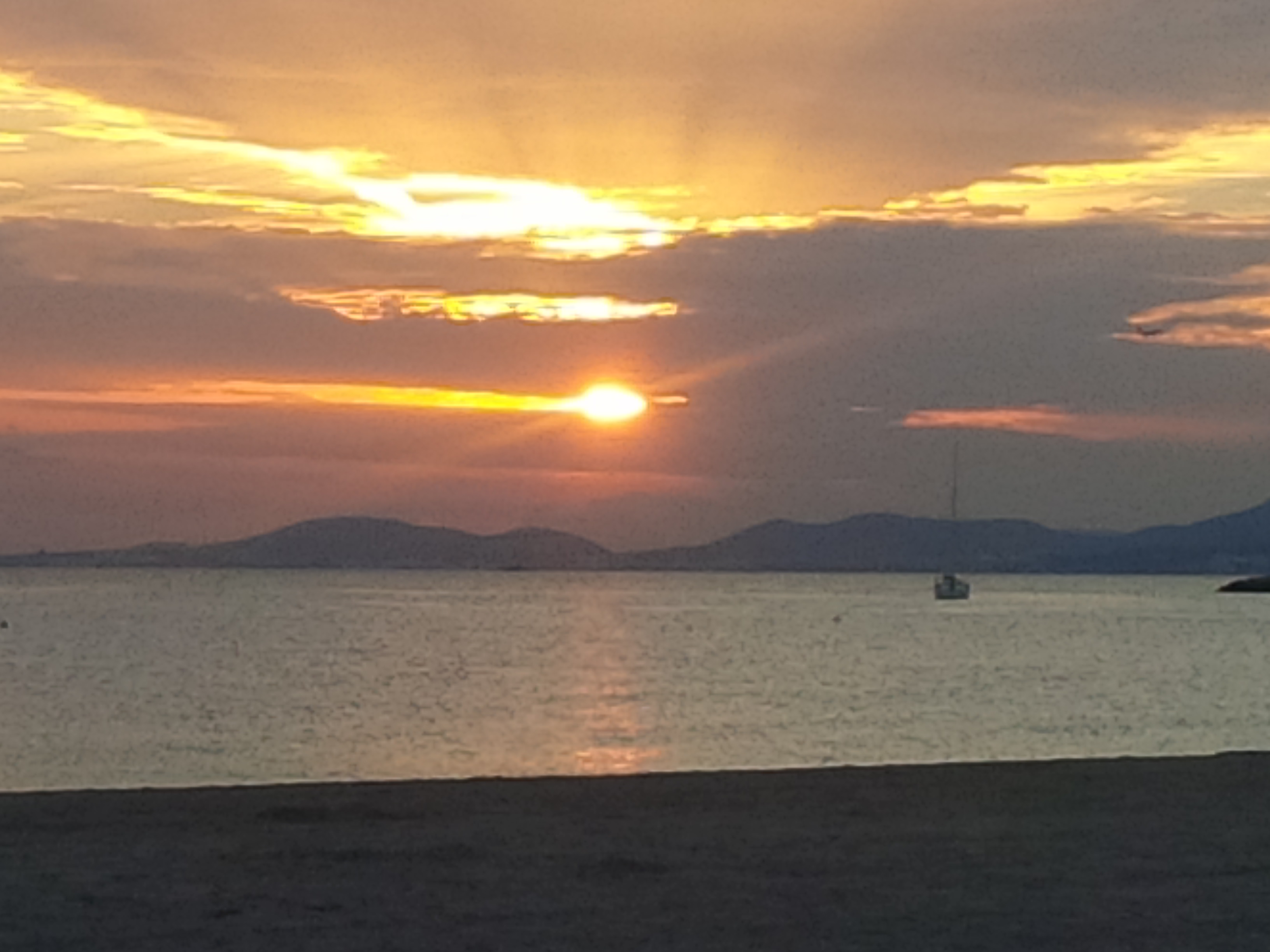
Sunset at the Bay of Palma

The Bay of Palma (Catalan: Badia de Palma, Spanish: Bahía de Palma) is a bay located to the south of Palma, Mallorca, Spain. It is in the south-west of the Balearic Island of Mallorca. Palma's harbour is located on the northern shores along with some famous beaches. It is bounded to the west by Cape Cala Figuera, to the north by the city of Palma, to the south by the Mediterranean Sea and to the east by the White Cape. The Serra de Na Burguesa terminates at its shore.

== Notable residents ==
- Steve McManaman, English footballer
