= Sofia Bekatorou =

Greek sailing champion

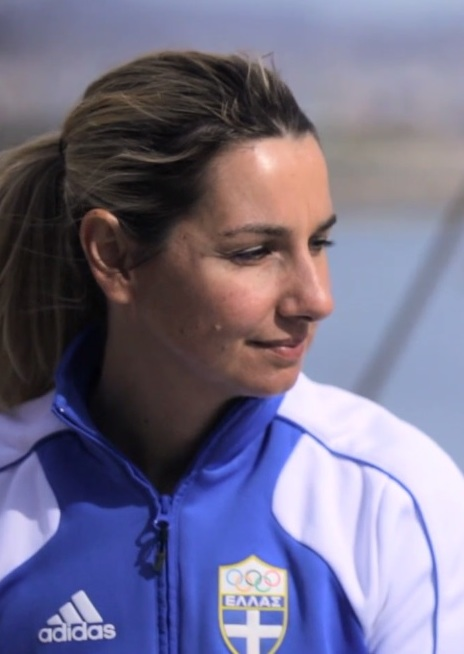
- Bekatorou in 2014

Personal information
- Native name: Σοφία Μπεκατώρου
- Born: 26 December 1977 (age 48) Athens, Greece

Sailing career
- Sport: Sailing
Medal record
Women's sailing
Representing Greece
Olympic Games
| Gold medal – first place | 2004 Athens | 470 class |
| Bronze medal – third place | 2008 Beijing | Yngling class |
World Championships
| Gold medal – first place | 2000 Balatonfüred | 470 class |
| Gold medal – first place | 2001 Koper | 470 class |
| Gold medal – first place | 2002 Cagliari | 470 class |
| Gold medal – first place | 2003 Cádiz | 470 class |
European Championships
| Gold medal – first place | 2001 Dún Laoghaire | 470 class |
| Gold medal – first place | 2002 Tallinn | 470 class |
| Silver medal – second place | 2000 Dervio | 470 class |
| Bronze medal – third place | 2007 Warnemünde | Yngling class |

Sofia Bekatorou (Greek: Σοφία Μπεκατώρου; born 26 December 1977) is a Greek sailing champion.

== Career ==
She has participated in over hundreds of main class events including 2004 Summer Olympics sailing competition, where she won the gold medal in the women's double-handed dinghy event in the 470 with her pair Emilia Tsoulfa (Greece). After a serious back injury, she won a bronze medal in the yngling keelboat class at the 2008 Summer Olympics.

Bekatorou was the first female flag bearer for Greece in the history of Summer Olympics at the 2016 Summer Olympics in Rio de Janeiro, participating in the Olympic Games for the 4th time. She and partner Mike Pateniotis competed in the Nacra 17 event. They finished in 18th place.

== #MeTinSofia ==
Bekatorou started the Hellenic #MeToo movement (#MeTinSofia) after revealing a sexual harassment and abuse episode involving a senior Hellenic Sailing Federation (HSF) member in his hotel room, shortly after trials for the 2000 Sydney Olympics. Soon, the senior was revealed to be Aristides Adamopoulos, the vice-president of HSF and also, a member of the New Democracy political party. The interview triggered a wave of resignations in the HSF and echoed massively across Greece and eventually inspired Zeta Douka and a number of other actors to come forward with their own stories of sexual harassment and abuse.

== Politics ==
Sofia Bekatorou was a candidate in the 2024 European Parliament elections with the SYRIZA party.

== See also ==
- Sailing at the Summer Olympics

Olympic Games
| Preceded by Alexandros Nikolaidis | Flagbearer for Greece; 2016 Rio de Janeiro | Succeeded by Incumbent |
