= Nadège Douroux =

French yacht racer (born 1981)

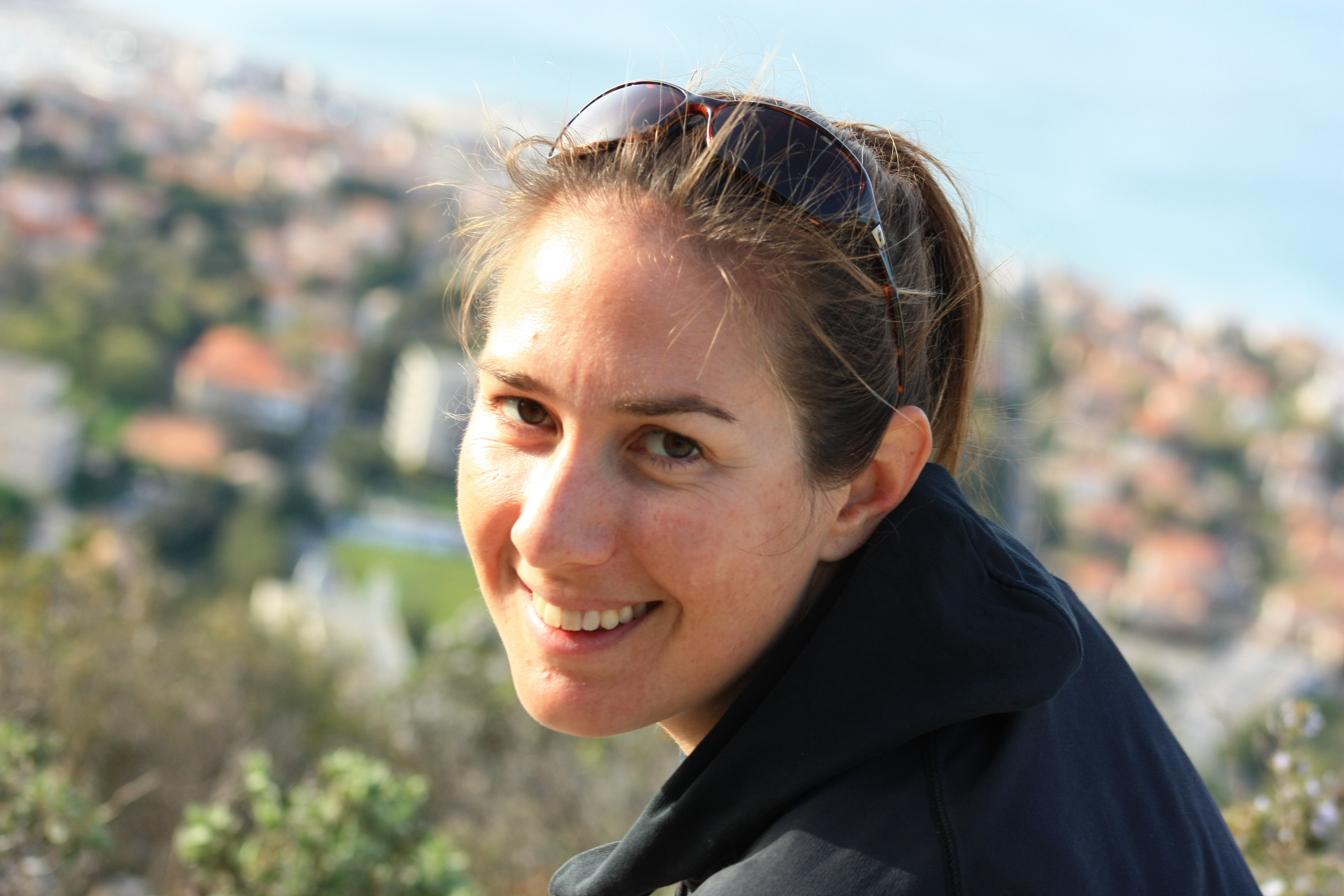
Nadège Douroux

Nadège Douroux (born 23 May 1981) is a French yacht racer who competed in the 2004 Summer Olympics.
