= Christina Bassadone =

British sailor (born 1981)

Personal information
- Full name: Christina Victoria Bassadone
- Born: 27 December 1981 (age 44) Chichester

Sailing career
- Sport: Sailing
Medal record
Sailing
Representing Great Britain
World Championships
Gold medal – first place	2000 La Rochelle	Women's 420
Silver medal – second place	2005 San Francisco	Women's 470
Bronze medal – third place	2007 Cascais	Women's 470

Christina Victoria Bassadone (born 27 December 1981) is a British sailor who competed in the 2008 Summer Olympics.
