= Nathan Wilmot =

Australian sailor

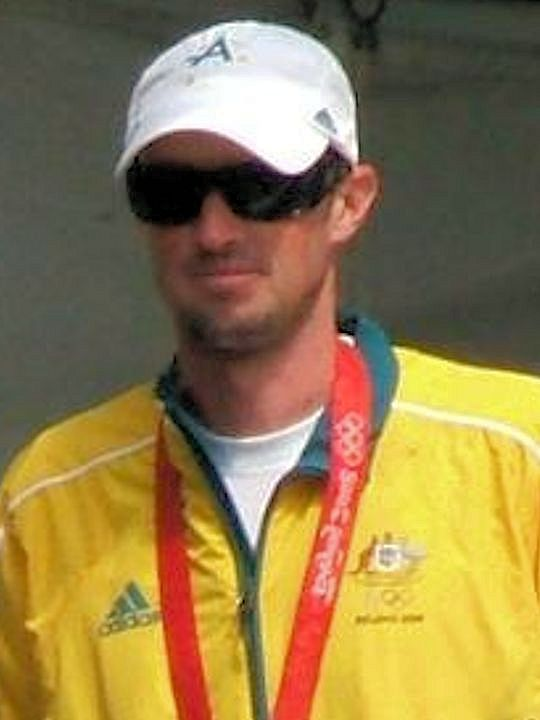
- Wilmot in 2008

Personal information
- Full name: Nathan James Wilmot
- Born: 13 December 1979 (age 46) Sydney, New South Wales, Australia

Sailing career
- Sport: Sailing
- Classes: Men's 470, Men's 420
Medal record
Men's sailing
Representing Australia
Olympic Games
| Gold medal – first place | 2008 Beijing | Men's 470 |
470 World Championships
| Bronze medal – third place | 2001 Koper | Men's 470 |
| Silver medal – second place | 2003 Cádiz | Men's 470 |
| Gold medal – first place | 2004 Zadar | Men's 470 |
| Gold medal – first place | 2005 San Francisco | Men's 470 |
| Silver medal – second place | 2006 Rizhao | Men's 470 |
| Gold medal – first place | 2007 Cascais | Men's 470 |
420 World Championships
| Gold medal – first place | 2004 Melbourne | Men's 420 |

Nathan James Wilmot (born 13 December 1979) is a sailor, and a member of the Australian sailing team. He has won five world titles along with teammate Malcolm Page in the 470 class. They also won the Olympic test event in Qingdao in 2007 and were considered favourites to win the 470 event at the 2008 Summer Olympics.

In the Beijing Olympic games they won convincingly on points leading into the medal race which they only had to finish to win first place. They won the finale race which secured them Olympic gold. They have been now classified as the most successful 470 competitors in history.

He was an Australian Institute of Sport scholarship holder.

Wilmot comes from a sailing family. His father competed at the 1984 Summer Olympics and his uncle at the 1988 Summer Olympics. Uncle Hugh Treharne was tactician on the America's Cup syndicate, Australia II in 1983.
