= Emilia Tsoulfa =

Greek sailor

Medal record

Women's sailing

Representing Greece

Olympic Games
Gold medal – first place	2004 Athens	470 class

Emilia Tsoulfa (Greek: Αιμιλία Τσουλφά; born 15 May 1973 in Athens) is a Greek sailor.

She has been sailing in Piraeus Sailing Club since she was 12 years old. She participated in over 470 main classes events and won Gold medals in: 2000, 2001, 2002 World and European championships. Also won the bronze medal in 1998 for European championships.

At the Olympic Games of 2004 in Athens, Emilia won the gold medal in the sailing competition / Women's double-handed dinghy event in the 470class with her pair Sofia Bekatorou. She has also participated at the 2000 Olympic Games in Sydney and also at 1996 Olympic sailing competition in Atlanta (finished 17th), being at that time the first female Greek sailor at the Olympic games.

In the Athens Olympic closing ceremony in 2004, Emilia Tsoulfa with Sofia Bekatorou participated in the extinguishing of the flame.

After her daughter's birth in 2006 she decided to stop for a while from sailing. Emilia now has three daughters and she is serving in the Greek Army as captain.

She competed with Ariadne Spanaki in the women's 470 event at the 2020 Summer Olympics.
