= Emanuela Sossi =

Italian yacht racer

Personal information
- Nickname: Manu
- Nationality: Italy
- Born: 7 March 1972 (age 54) Trieste, Italy
- Height: 180 cm (5 ft 11 in)
- Weight: 70 kg (154 lb)

Sailing career
- Sport: Sailing
- Club: Società Triestina della Vela

Emanuela Sossi (born 7 March 1972) is an Italian yacht racer who competed in the 1996 Summer Olympics and in the 2000 Summer Olympics.
