= Malcolm Page (sailor) =

Australian sailor

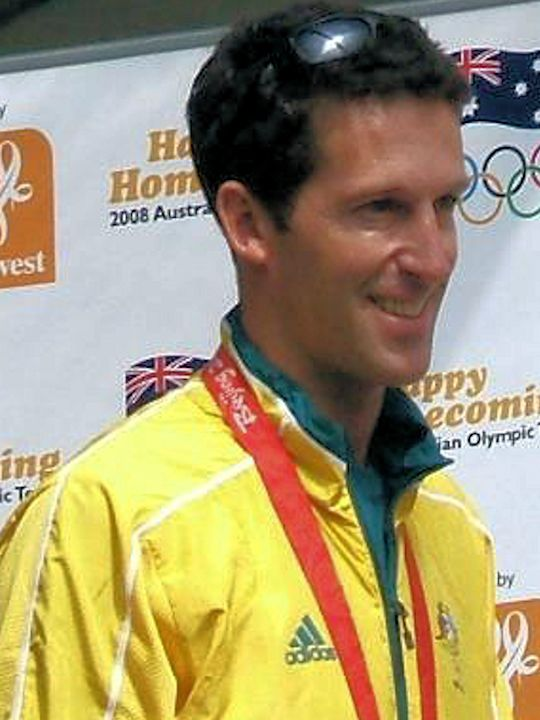
- Page in 2008

Personal information
- Full name: Malcolm George Page
- Born: 22 March 1972 (age 54) Sydney, New South Wales, Australia

Sailing career
- Sport: Sailing
- Classes: Men's 470, Men's 420
Medal record
Men's sailing
Representing Australia
Olympic Games
Gold medal – first place	2008 Beijing	Men's 470
Gold medal – first place	2012 London	Men's 470
470 World Championships
Gold medal – first place	2004 Zadar	Men's 470
Gold medal – first place	2005 San Francisco, USA	Men's 470
Gold medal – first place	2007 Cascais, POR	Men's 470
Gold medal – first place	2010 Hague, NED	Men's 470
Gold medal – first place	2011 Perth, AUS	Men's 470
Gold medal – first place	2012 Barcelona, ESP	Men's 470
420 World Championships
Gold medal – first place	2004 Melbourne, AUS	Men's 420

Malcolm George Page, OAM (born 22 March 1972) is an Australian professional sailor and gold medalist at the 2008 and 2012 Olympic Games.

== Personal life ==
Page was educated at St Andrew's Cathedral School in Sydney. After retiring from Olympic sailing, Page went on to work for World Sailing as head of media, before becoming chief of Olympic Sailing for US Sailing. He then returned to Australia as the head coach of the Victorian Institute of Sport Sailing program. He is currently coaching with the Australian sailing team.

== Career highlights ==
=== Olympics ===
- 2012 Olympics – 1st (gold) – 470 with Mathew Belcher
- 2008 Olympics – 1st (gold) – 470 with Nathan Wilmot
- 2004 Olympics – 12th – 470 with Nathan Wilmot

Page won five world titles with teammate Nathan Wilmot. The pair also won the Olympic test event in Qingdao and were considered favourites to win the 470 event at the 2008 Summer Olympics. Following Wilmot's retirement, Page partnered with Mathew Belcher, and again won gold in the 470 class at the 2012 Summer Olympics in London.

Page was the official Australian flag bearer at the closing ceremony of the London Olympics.

=== World Championships ===
Date	Pos.	Class	Gender	Title	Location	Notes	Ref.
2019-06	7	Etchells	Open	Etchells World Championship	Corpus Christi, USA	Crew	
2017	5	Etchells	Open	Etchells World Championship	San Francisco, USA	Crew	
2016	5	Etchells	Open	Etchells World Championship	Cowes, GBR	Crew	
2015	12	Etchells	Open	Etchells World Championship	HKG	Crew	
2014-08	(silver) 2nd	Melges 20	Open	Melges 20 World Championship	Riva del Garda, ITA		
2014-06	27	Etchells	Open	Etchells World Championship	Rhode Island, USA		
2012-12	7	SB20	Open	UON – SB20 World Championship	Hamilton Island, AUS		
2012-09	9	Farr 40	Open	Rolex Farr 40 World Championship	Chicago, USA		
2012-05	(gold) 1st	470	Male	470 World Championship	Barcelona, ESP		
2011-12	(gold) 1st	470	Male	Perth 2011 ISAF Sailing World Championships	Perth, AUS		
2011-02	5	Farr 40	Open	Rolex Farr 40 World Championship	Sydney, AUS		
2010-07	(gold) 1st	470	Male	Delta Lloyd – 470 World Championships	Hague, NED		
2010-04	4	Farr 40	Open	Rolex Farr 40 World Championship	Casa de Campo, DOM		
2009-08	5	470	Male	470 World Championship	Rungsted, Copenhagen, DEN		
2009-06	9	Farr 40	Open	Rolex Farr 40 World Championship	Sardinia, ITA		
2008-01	8	470	Male	470 World Championships	Melbourne, AUS		
2007-06	(gold) 1st	470	Male	ISAF Sailing World Championships	Cascais, POR		
2006-09	(silver) 2nd	470	Male	470 World Championships	Rizhao, CHN		
2005-08	(gold) 1st	470	Male	470 World Championships	San Francisco, USA		
2004-05	(gold) 1st	470	Male	470 World Championships (Olympic Qualifier)	SC Uskok, Zadar		
2004-01	(gold) 1st	420	Male or Mixed	420 class World Championships	Melbourne, VIC, AUS		
2003-09	(silver) 2nd	470	Male	ISAF Sailing World Championships	Cádiz, ESP		
2002-09	5	470	Male	470 World Championships	Cagliari, Sardinia Island, ITA		
2001-09	(bronze) 3rd	470	Open	470 World Championship	Koper, SLO		
1999-01	14	470		Men's / Mixed 470 World Championship	Melbourne, AUS		
1998-08	27	470		470 World Championships	Mallorca, ESP		

=== International 470 class ===
Date	Grade	Pos.	Class	Gender	Title	Location	Notes	Ref.
2010-08		2nd	470	Male	Sail for Gold	Weymouth		
2010-06	World Series	1st	470	Male	ISAF World Cup	Multiple Events		
2010-06		1st	470	Male	Kiel Week	Kiel		
2010-05		2nd	470	Male	Delta Lloyd Regatta	Medemblik		
2010-03	Grade 2	4th	470	Male	Princess Sofia Regata	Palma		
2010-01	Grade 1	2nd	470	Male	Miami Olympic Classes Regatta	Miami		
2010-01	Grade 1	1st	470	Male	Sail Melbourne	Melbourne		
2009-12	Grade 1	1st	470	Male	Sail Sydney	Sydney		
2009-09	Grade 2	4th	470	Male	Sail for Gold	Weymouth		
2009	Continental	5th	470	Male	470 European Championships			
2009		6th	470	Male	Delta Lloyd Regatta			
2009		4th	470	Male	Skandia Sail for Gold	Weymouth		
2008		1st	470	Male	European Championship			
2008		1st	470	Male	Delta Lloyd Holland Regatta			
2007		1st	470	Male	Beijing Olympic Test Event			
2006	Games	1st	470	Male	ISAF World Sailing Games			
2006	Grade 1	1st	470	Male	Sail Melbourne			
2005		1st	470	Male	Sail Melbourne			
2004		2nd	470	Male	Keiler Wocher			
2003		3rd	470	Male	Hyères Semaine Olympique Française			
2003		2nd	470	Male	Keiler Wocher			
2003		1st	470	Male	Sail Melbourne			
2002	Continental	1st	470	Male	European Championship			
2002		1st	470	Male	French Spring Cup			
2002		1st	470	Male	Hyères Semaine Olympique Française			
2002		1st	470	Male	Kiel Weekr			
2002		1st	470	Male	Sail Melbourne			

=== Nationals ===
- 2010 – 470 Australian National Championship – Gold
- 2009 – 470 Australian National Championship – Gold
- 2008 – 470 Australian National Championship – Gold
- 2006 – 470 Australian National Championship – Gold
- 2005 – 470 Australian National Championship – Gold
- 2004 – 470 Australian National Championship – Gold
- 2003 – 470 Australian National Championship – Gold
- 2002 – 470 French National Championship – Gold
- 2002 – 470 Australian National Championship – Gold
- 2001 – 470 Australian National Championship – Gold
- 2009 – Australian Sydney 38 Class – Gold
- 2006 – Australian Champion Sydney 38 Class – Gold
- 1986 – Australian National Championship Manly Junior Class – Gold
- 1991 – Australian National Championship Flying 11 Class – Gold

=== Others ===
- 2010 – 1st Taser – World Master Games, double handed +45 – helmed by Martin Hill
- 1995 – 18 ft Skiff Grand Prix circuit

== Awards and committees ==
- 2013 World Sailing Athlete Commission Chair
- 2009 Australian Yachtsman of the Year
- 2003, 04, 05, 06, 08, 09 Australian Yachtsman Finalist
- 2004 & 05 Yachting NSW Yachtsperson of the Year
- 2005, 07 & 08 Australian Institute of Sport Team of the Year
- 2005, 07 & 08 New South Wales Institute of Sport Team of the Year
- 2005, 07 & 08 New South Wales Sport Team of the Year
- 2005 Australia Sports Team Finalist
- 2009, 10 Australian Sports Commission Athletes Commission
- 2009, 10, 11, 12 Member ISAF Athletes Commission
- 2011 Australian Institute of Sport (AIS) 'Best of the Best'
- 2016 Sport Australia Hall of Fame Athlete Member
