= Ingrid Petitjean =

French yacht racer

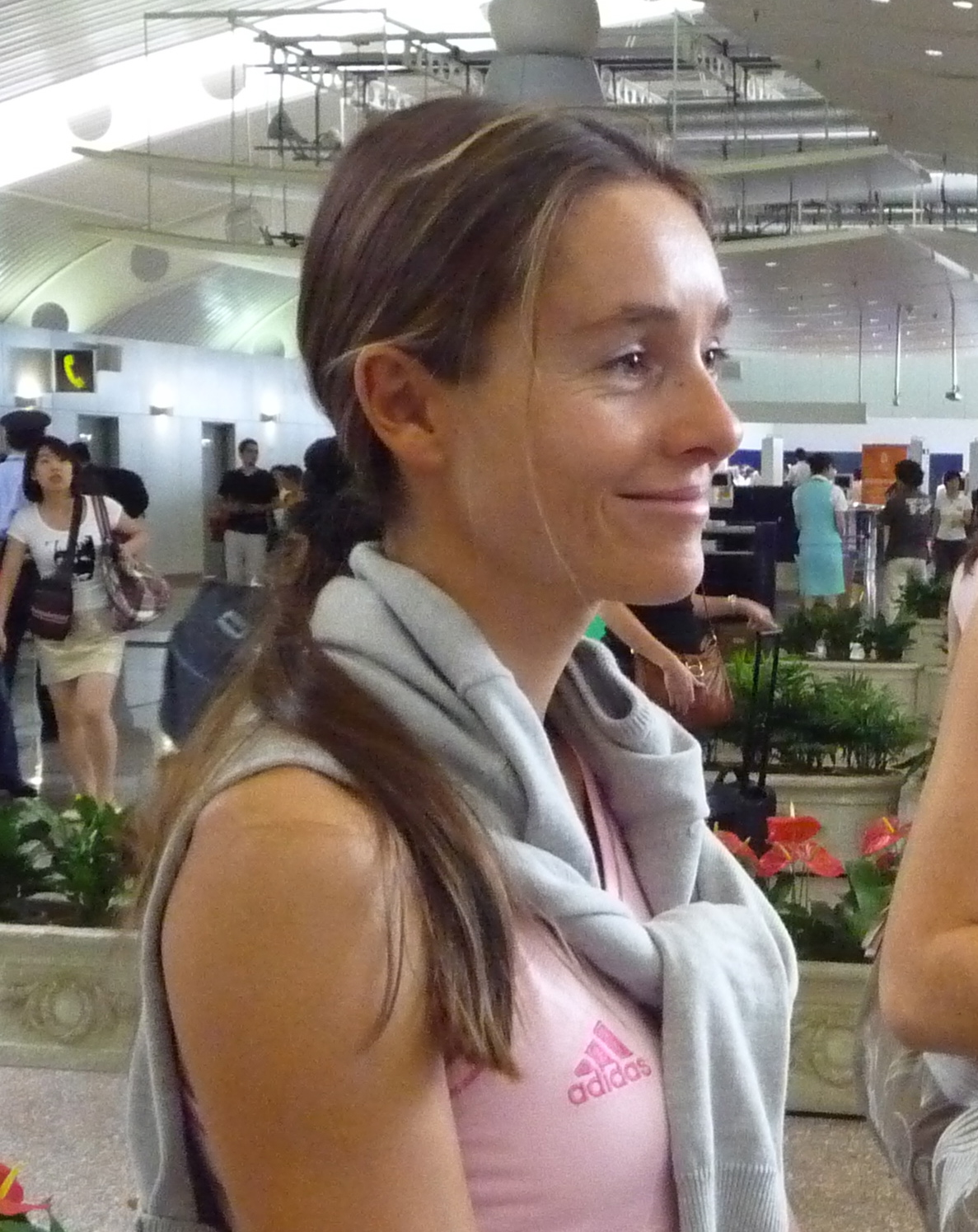
- Petitjean in 2008

Personal information
- Nationality: French
- Born: 11 December 1980 (age 44); Menton, Alpes-Maritimes, France
- Height: 166 cm (5 ft 5 in)
- Weight: 49 kg (108 lb)

Sailing career
- Class: 470 (dinghy)
- Club: USPEG Voile Marseille

Ingrid Petitjean (born 11 December 1980) is a French yacht racer who competed in the 2004 Summer Olympics and in the 2008 Summer Olympics in the women's 470 event.
