= Sailing at the 2008 Summer Olympics – Qualification =

== Qualification rules ==
A nation may earn up to 1 boat in each of the 11 Sailing events.

== Summary ==
| Nation | Men | | | | Women | | | | Open | | | Total | |
| Nation | RS:X | Laser | 470 | Star | RS:X | Laser Radial | 470 | Yngling | 49er | Finn | Tornado | Boats | Athletes |
|---|---|---|---|---|---|---|---|---|---|---|---|---|---|
| Argentina | X | X | X | | X | X | X | | | | X | 7 | 10 |
| Australia | | X | X | X | X | X | X | X | X | X | X | 10 | 17 |
| Austria | | X | X | X | | | X | | X | | X | 6 | 11 |
| Barbados | | X | | | | | | | | | | 1 | 1 |
| Belarus | X | | X | | | X | | | | | | 3 | 4 |
| Belgium | | | | | | X | | | | | X | 2 | 3 |
| Brazil | X | X | X | X | X | | X | | X | X | | 8 | 12 |
| Bulgaria | | | | | X | | | | | | | 1 | 1 |
| Canada | X | X | X | | X | X | | X | X | X | X | 9 | 14 |
| Chile | | X | | | | | | | | | | 1 | 1 |
| China | X | X | X | X | X | X | X | X | X | X | X | 11 | 18 |
| Chinese Taipei | X | | | | | | | | | | | 1 | 1 |
| Colombia | X | | | | | | | | | | | 1 | 1 |
| Croatia | X | X | X | X | | X | | | X | X | | 7 | 10 |
| Cyprus | X | X | | | X | | | | | X | | 4 | 4 |
| Czech Republic | | X | | | | | X | | | X | | 3 | 4 |
| Denmark | X | X | | | X | | | | X | X | | 5 | 6 |
| Dominican Republic | | X | | | | | | | | | | 1 | 1 |
| Estonia | X | X | | | | | | | | | | 2 | 2 |
| Finland | | X | X | | X | X | | X | | X | | 6 | 9 |
| France | X | X | X | X | X | X | X | X | X | X | X | 11 | 18 |
| Germany | | | | X | | X | X | X | X | | X | 6 | 12 |
| Great Britain | X | X | X | X | X | X | X | X | X | X | X | 11 | 18 |
| Greece | X | X | X | | X | X | | X | | X | X | 8 | 12 |
| Guatemala | | X | | | | | | | | | | 1 | 1 |
| Hong Kong | X | | | | X | | | | | | | 2 | 2 |
| Hungary | X | X | | | X | | | | | | | 3 | 3 |
| India | | | | | | | | | | X | | 1 | 1 |
| Indonesia | X | | | | | | | | | | | 1 | 1 |
| Ireland | | | X | X | | X | | | | X | | 4 | 6 |
| Israel | X | | X | | X | X | X | | | | | 5 | 7 |
| Italy | X | X | X | X | X | X | X | X | X | X | X | 11 | 18 |
| Japan | X | X | X | | X | | X | | X | | | 6 | 9 |
| Lithuania | | | | | | X | | | | | | 1 | 1 |
| Luxembourg | | X | | | | | | | | | | 1 | 1 |
| Malaysia | | X | | | | | | | | | | 1 | 1 |
| Mexico | X | | | | X | X | | | | | | 3 | 3 |
| Netherlands | X | X | X | | | | X | X | | X | X | 7 | 12 |
| New Zealand | X | X | X | X | X | X | | | | X | | 7 | 9 |
| Norway | | X | | | X | X | | X | X | X | | 6 | 9 |
| Paraguay | | | | | | X | | | | | | 1 | 1 |
| Peru | | | | | | X | | | | | | 1 | 1 |
| Poland | X | X | X | X | X | X | | | X | X | | 8 | 11 |
| Portugal | X | X | X | X | | | | | X | | | 5 | 8 |
| Russia | X | X | X | | X | X | | X | | X | | 7 | 10 |
| Seychelles | | X | | | | | | | | | | 1 | 1 |
| Singapore | | X | X | | | X | X | | | | | 4 | 6 |
| Slovakia | X | | | | | | | | | | | 1 | 1 |
| Slovenia | | X | X | | | | X | | | X | | 4 | 6 |
| South Africa | | | | | | | | X | | | | 1 | 3 |
| South Korea | X | X | X | | | | | | | | | 3 | 4 |
| Spain | X | X | X | | X | X | X | X | X | X | X | 10 | 16 |
| Sweden | | X | X | X | | X | X | | X | X | | 7 | 11 |
| Switzerland | X | X | X | X | | X | X | | | | | 6 | 9 |
| Thailand | X | | | | X | | | | | | | 2 | 2 |
| Turkey | X | X | X | | X | | | | | X | | 5 | 6 |
| Ukraine | X | | | | X | | | | X | | X | 4 | 6 |
| United Arab Emirates | | X | | | | | | | | | | 1 | 1 |
| United States | X | X | X | X | X | X | X | X | X | X | X | 11 | 18 |
| Uruguay | | X | | | | | | | | | | 1 | 1 |
| Venezuela | X | X | | | | | | | | X | | 3 | 3 |
| Virgin Islands | | X | | | | | | | | | | 1 | 1 |
| Total: 62 NOCs | 35 | 43 | 29 | 16 | 27 | 28 | 19 | 15 | 19 | 26 | 15 | 272 | 400 |

== Qualification Timeline ==
| Event | Date | Location |
|---|---|---|
| 2007 ISAF Sailing World Championships | Jun 28 – Jul 13, 2007 | (Portugal) Cascais |
| 2008 49er World Championships | January 2–9, 2008 | (Australia) Sydney |
| 2008 RS:X World Championships | January 10–20, 2008 | (New Zealand) Auckland |
| 2008 Finn Gold Cup | January 23–29, 2008 | (Australia) Melbourne |
| 2008 470 World Championships | January 24–30, 2008 | (Australia) Melbourne |
| 2008 Laser World Championships | February 7–13, 2008 | (Australia) Terrigal |
| 2008 Yngling World Championships | February 10–15, 2008 | (United States) Miami |
| 2008 Tornado World Championships | Feb 25 – Mar 1, 2008 | (New Zealand) Auckland |
| 2008 Laser Radial World Championships | March 15–20, 2008 | (New Zealand) Auckland |
| 2008 Star World Championships | April 11–17, 2008 | (United States) Miami |

== Men's events ==
=== Windsurfer – RS:X ===
| # | Nation | Qualification Tournament | Place in Event | Sailor | Sailor at Games |
|---|---|---|---|---|---|
| 1 | China | Host Country | —N/a | —N/a | Wang Aichen |
| 2 | Brazil | 2007 Worlds | 1 | Ricardo Santos | Ricardo Santos |
| 3 | Poland | 2007 Worlds | 2 | Przemysław Miarczyński | Przemysław Miarczyński |
| 4 | Great Britain | 2007 Worlds | 3 | Nick Dempsey | Nick Dempsey |
| 5 | Portugal | 2007 Worlds | 4 | João Rodrigues | João Rodrigues |
| 6 | Spain | 2007 Worlds | 6 | Iván Pastor | Iván Pastor |
| 7 | France | 2007 Worlds | 7 | Julien Bontemps | Julien Bontemps |
| 8 | Israel | 2007 Worlds | 8 | Shahar Tzuberi | Shahar Tzuberi |
| 9 | Greece | 2007 Worlds | 10 | Nikolaos Kaklamanakis | Nikolaos Kaklamanakis |
| 10 | Italy | 2007 Worlds | 11 | Fabian Heidegger | Fabian Heidegger |
| 11 | Switzerland | 2007 Worlds | 13 | Richard Stauffacher | Richard Stauffacher |
| 12 | New Zealand | 2007 Worlds | 15 | Tom Ashley | Tom Ashley |
| 13 | Netherlands | 2007 Worlds | 18 | Casper Bouman | Casper Bouman |
| 14 | Turkey | 2007 Worlds | 19 | Ertuğrul İçingir | Ertuğrul İçingir |
| 15 | Hungary | 2007 Worlds | 24 | Áron Gádorfalvi | Áron Gádorfalvi |
| 16 | Canada | 2007 Worlds | 26 | Zachary Plavsic | Zachary Plavsic |
| 17 | Denmark | 2007 Worlds | 29 | Jonas Kældsø Poulsen | Jonas Kældsø Poulsen |
| 18 | Ukraine | 2007 Worlds | 32 | Maksym Oberemko | Maksym Oberemko |
| 19 | Japan | 2007 Worlds | 33 | Makoto Tomizawa | Makoto Tomizawa |
| — | Germany | 2007 Worlds | 35 | Toni Wilhelm | |
| 20 | Mexico | 2007 Worlds | 39 | David Mier | David Mier |
| 21 | Hong Kong | 2007 Worlds | 43 | Ho Chi Ho | Chan King Yin |
| 22 | Cyprus | 2007 Worlds | 45 | Andreas Cariolou | Andreas Cariolou |
| 23 | Argentina | 2007 Worlds | 47 | Mariano Reutemann | Mariano Reutemann |
| 24 | United States | 2007 Worlds | 50 | Benjamin Barger | Benjamin Barger |
| 25 | Belarus | 2007 Worlds | 55 | Mikalai Zhukavets | Mikalai Zhukavets |
| — | Australia | 2008 Worlds | 48 | Steve Allen | |
| 26 | Thailand | 2008 Worlds | 49 | Ek Boonsawad | Ek Boonsawad |
| 27 | South Korea | 2008 Worlds | 50 | Kim Hyung-kwon | Lee Tae-hoon |
| 28 | Russia | 2008 Worlds | 57 | Aleksey Tokarev | Aleksey Tokarev |
| 29 | Slovakia | 2008 Worlds | 63 | Patrik Pollák | Patrik Pollák |
| 30 | Croatia | 2008 Worlds | 68 | Luka Mratović | Luka Mratović |
| 31 | Indonesia | 2008 Worlds | 70 | Oka Sulaksana | Oka Sulaksana |
| 32 | Estonia | 2008 Worlds | 71 | Henri Kaar | Johannes Ahun |
| 33 | Venezuela | 2008 Worlds | 77 | Carlos Julio Flores | Carlos Julio Flores |
| 34 | Colombia^{[u]} | 2008 Worlds | 87 | Santiago Grillo | Santiago Grillo |
| 35 | Chinese Taipei^{[u]} | 2008 Worlds | 95 | Chang Hao | Chang Hao |

=== One-person dinghy – Laser ===
| # | Nation | Qualification Tournament | Place in Event | Sailor | Sailor at Games |
|---|---|---|---|---|---|
| 1 | China | Host Country | —N/a | —N/a | Shen Sheng |
| 2 | Australia | 2007 Worlds | 1 | Tom Slingsby | Tom Slingsby |
| 3 | New Zealand | 2007 Worlds | 2 | Andrew Murdoch | Andrew Murdoch |
| 4 | Estonia | 2007 Worlds | 3 | Deniss Karpak | Deniss Karpak |
| 5 | Croatia | 2007 Worlds | 4 | Mate Arapov | Luka Radelić |
| 6 | Great Britain | 2007 Worlds | 5 | Paul Goodison | Paul Goodison |
| 7 | Sweden | 2007 Worlds | 6 | Rasmus Myrgren | Rasmus Myrgren |
| 8 | Chile | 2007 Worlds | 7 | Matías del Solar | Matías del Solar |
| 9 | France | 2007 Worlds | 8 | Thomas Le Breton | Jean-Baptiste Bernaz |
| 10 | Portugal | 2007 Worlds | 10 | Gustavo Lima | Gustavo Lima |
| — | Germany | 2007 Worlds | 14 | Malte Kamrath | |
| 11 | Uruguay | 2007 Worlds | 18 | Alejandro Foglia | Alejandro Foglia |
| 12 | Spain | 2007 Worlds | 19 | Javier Hernández | Javier Hernández |
| 13 | Brazil | 2007 Worlds | 20 | Bruno Fontes | Bruno Fontes |
| 14 | Slovenia | 2007 Worlds | 22 | Vasilij Žbogar | Vasilij Žbogar |
| 15 | Denmark | 2007 Worlds | 23 | Anders Nyholm | Anders Nyholm |
| 16 | Finland | 2007 Worlds | 24 | Roope Suomalainen | Pierre Collura |
| 17 | Italy | 2007 Worlds | 28 | Diego Romero | Diego Romero |
| 18 | United States | 2007 Worlds | 29 | Andrew Campbell | Andrew Campbell |
| 19 | Canada | 2007 Worlds | 32 | Mike Leigh | Mike Leigh |
| 20 | Netherlands | 2007 Worlds | 35 | Roelof Bouwmeester | Rutger van Schaardenburg |
| 21 | Greece | 2007 Worlds | 36 | Evangelos Cheimonas | Evangelos Cheimonas |
| 22 | Argentina | 2007 Worlds | 39 | Julio Alsogaray | Julio Alsogaray |
| 23 | Austria | 2007 Worlds | 41 | Andreas Geritzer | Andreas Geritzer |
| 24 | Poland | 2007 Worlds | 45 | Karol Porozynski | Maciej Grabowski |
| 25 | Seychelles | 2007 Worlds | 49 | Allan Julie | Allan Julie |
| 26 | Turkey | 2007 Worlds | 51 | Kemal Muslubaş | Kemal Muslubaş |
| 27 | Czech Republic | 2007 Worlds | 52 | Martin Trčka | Martin Trčka |
| 28 | Norway | 2007 Worlds | 55 | Kristian Ruth | Kristian Ruth |
| 29 | Cyprus | 2007 Worlds | 62 | Pavlos Kontides | Pavlos Kontides |
| 30 | South Korea | 2008 Worlds | 42 | Ha Jee-min | Ha Jee-min |
| 31 | Switzerland | 2008 Worlds | 59 | Max Bulley | Christoph Bottoni |
| 32 | Japan | 2008 Worlds | 64 | Yoichi Iijima | Yoichi Iijima |
| 33 | Malaysia | 2008 Worlds | 69 | Kevin Lim | Kevin Lim |
| 34 | Singapore | 2008 Worlds | 77 | Koh Seng Leong | Koh Seng Leong |
| 35 | Venezuela | 2008 Worlds | 80 | José Ruiz | José Ruiz |
| 36 | Dominican Republic | 2008 Worlds | 85 | Raúl Aguayo | Raúl Aguayo |
| 37 | Russia | 2008 Worlds | 86 | Igor Lisovenko | Igor Lisovenko |
| 38 | Hungary | 2008 Worlds | 87 | Zsombor Berecz | Zsombor Berecz |
| 39 | Guatemala | 2008 Worlds | 99 | Juan Ignacio Maegli | Juan Ignacio Maegli |
| 40 | Luxembourg^{[u]} | 2008 Worlds | 104 | Marc Schmit | Marc Schmit |
| 41 | Virgin Islands | Tripartite | —N/a | —N/a | Thomas Barrows III |
| 42 | Barbados | Tripartite | —N/a | —N/a | Gregory Douglas |
| 43 | United Arab Emirates | Tripartite | —N/a | —N/a | Adil Mohammad |

=== Two-person dinghy – 470 ===
| # | Nation | Qualification Tournament | Place in Event | Sailor | Sailor at Games |
|---|---|---|---|---|---|
| 1 | China | Host Country | —N/a | —N/a | Wang Weidong; Deng Daokun |
| 2 | Great Britain | 2007 Worlds | 1 | Nick Rogers; Joe Glanfield | Nick Rogers; Joe Glanfield |
| 3 | Netherlands | 2007 Worlds | 2 | Sven Coster; Kalle Coster | Sven Coster; Kalle Coster |
| 4 | Israel | 2007 Worlds | 3 | Gideon Kliger; Udi Gal | Gideon Kliger; Udi Gal |
| 5 | Portugal | 2007 Worlds | 4 | Álvaro Marinho; Miguel Nunes | Álvaro Marinho; Miguel Nunes |
| 6 | Australia | 2007 Worlds | 5 | Nathan Wilmot; Malcolm Page | Nathan Wilmot; Malcolm Page |
| 7 | Croatia | 2007 Worlds | 6 | Šime Fantela; Igor Marenić | Šime Fantela; Igor Marenić |
| 8 | France | 2007 Worlds | 7 | Benjamin Bonnaud; Romain Bonnaud | Nicolas Charbonnier; Olivier Bausset |
| 9 | Spain | 2007 Worlds | 9 | Onán Barreiros; Aarón Sarmiento | Onán Barreiros; Aarón Sarmiento |
| 10 | United States | 2007 Worlds | 10 | Stuart McNay; Graham Biehl | Stuart McNay; Graham Biehl |
| 11 | Argentina | 2007 Worlds | 12 | Javier Conte; Juan de la Fuente | Javier Conte; Juan de la Fuente |
| 12 | Belarus | 2007 Worlds | 14 | Sergei Desukevich; Pavel Logunov | Sergei Desukevich; Pavel Logunov |
| 13 | Japan | 2007 Worlds | 15 | Kan Yamada; Kenichi Nakamura | Tetsuya Matsunaga; Taro Ueno |
| 14 | Sweden | 2007 Worlds | 18 | Johan Molund; Niels Flohr | Anton Dahlberg; Sebastian Östling |
| — | Germany | 2007 Worlds | 21 | Lukas Zellmer; Heiko Seelig | |
| 15 | Slovenia | 2007 Worlds | 25 | Karlo Hmeljak; Mitja Nevečny | Karlo Hmeljak; Mitja Nevečny |
| 16 | Greece | 2007 Worlds | 26 | Panagiotis Kampouridis; Gerasimos Orologas | Andreas Kosmatopoulos; Andreas Papadopoulos |
| 17 | Italy | 2007 Worlds | 28 | Gabrio Zandonà; Andrea Trani | Gabrio Zandonà; Andrea Trani |
| 18 | Canada | 2007 Worlds | 29 | Stéphane Locas; Oliver Bone | Stéphane Locas; Oliver Bone |
| 19 | South Korea | 2007 Worlds | 30 | Kim Chang-ju; Kim Ji-hoon | Yoon Cheul; Kim Hyeong-tae |
| 20 | Singapore | 2007 Worlds | 31 | Roy Tay; Peiming Chung | Xu Yuan Zhen; Terence Koh |
| 21 | Ireland | 2007 Worlds | 40 | Gerald Owens; Philip Lawton | Gerald Owens; Philip Lawton |
| 22 | New Zealand | 2008 Worlds | 11 | Carl Evans; Peter Burling | Carl Evans; Peter Burling |
| 23 | Russia | 2008 Worlds | 17 | Mikhail Sheremetyev; Maksim Sheremetyev | Mikhail Sheremetyev; Maksim Sheremetyev |
| 24 | Poland | 2008 Worlds | 20 | Patryk Piasecki; Kacper Ziemiński | Patryk Piasecki; Kacper Zieminski |
| 25 | Brazil | 2008 Worlds | 29 | Fábio Pillar; Samuel Albrecht | Fábio Pillar; Samuel Albrecht |
| 26 | Switzerland | 2008 Worlds | 39 | Tobias Etter; Felix Steiger | Tobias Etter; Felix Steiger |
| 27 | Austria | 2008 Worlds | 46 | Matthias Schmid; Florian Reichstädter | Matthias Schmid; Florian Reichstädter |
| 28 | Turkey | 2008 Worlds | 55 | Deniz Çınar; Ateş Çınar | Deniz Çınar; Ateş Çınar |
| 29 | Finland^{[u]} | 2008 Worlds | 58 | Joonas Lindgren; Niko Helander | Niklas Lindgren; Heikki Elomaa |

=== Keelboat – Star ===
| # | Nation | Qualification Tournament | Place in Event | Sailor | Sailor at Games |
|---|---|---|---|---|---|
| 1 | China | Host Country | —N/a | —N/a | Li Hongquan; Wang He |
| 2 | Brazil | 2007 Worlds | 1 | Robert Scheidt; Bruno Prada | Robert Scheidt; Bruno Prada |
| 3 | France | 2007 Worlds | 2 | Xavier Rohart; Pascal Rambeau | Xavier Rohart; Pascal Rambeau |
| 4 | Great Britain | 2007 Worlds | 3 | Iain Percy; Andrew Simpson | Iain Percy; Andrew Simpson |
| 5 | New Zealand | 2007 Worlds | 4 | Hamish Pepper; Carl Williams | Hamish Pepper; Carl Williams |
| 6 | Italy | 2007 Worlds | 5 | Diego Negri; Luigi Viale | Diego Negri; Luigi Viale |
| 7 | Poland | 2007 Worlds | 6 | Mateusz Kusznierewicz; Dominik Życki | Mateusz Kusznierewicz; Dominik Życki |
| 8 | Germany | 2007 Worlds | 7 | Marc Pickel; Ingo Borkowski | Marc Pickel; Ingo Borkowski |
| 9 | Sweden | 2007 Worlds | 8 | Fredrik Lööf; Anders Ekström | Fredrik Lööf; Anders Ekström |
| 10 | Australia | 2007 Worlds | 9 | Iain Murray; Andrew Palfrey | Iain Murray; Andrew Palfrey |
| 11 | Portugal | 2007 Worlds | 10 | Afonso Domingos; Bernardo Santos | Afonso Domingos; Bernardo Santos |
| 12 | United States | 2007 Worlds | 11 | Mark Reynolds; Hal Haenel | John Dane III; Austin Sperry |
| 13 | Switzerland | 2008 Worlds | 4 | Flavio Marazzi; Enrico De Maria | Flavio Marazzi; Enrico De Maria |
| 14 | Croatia | 2008 Worlds | 12 | Marin Lovrović Jr. Siniša Mikuličić | Marin Lovrović Jr. Siniša Mikuličić |
| 15 | Ireland | 2008 Worlds | 14 | Max Treacy; Anthony Shanks | Peter O'Leary; Stephen Milne |
| 16 | Austria | 2008 Worlds | 16 | Hans Spitzauer; Christian Nehammer | Hans Spitzauer; Christian Nehammer |

== Women's events ==
=== Windsurfer – RS:X ===
| # | Nation | Qualification Tournament | Place in Event | Sailor | Sailor at Games |
|---|---|---|---|---|---|
| 1 | China | Host Country | —N/a | —N/a | Yin Jian |
| 2 | Poland | 2007 Worlds | 1 | Zofia Klepacka | Zofia Klepacka |
| 3 | New Zealand | 2007 Worlds | 2 | Barbara Kendall | Barbara Kendall |
| 4 | Australia | 2007 Worlds | 3 | Jessica Crisp | Jessica Crisp |
| 5 | Spain | 2007 Worlds | 4 | Marina Alabau | Marina Alabau |
| 6 | Italy | 2007 Worlds | 5 | Alessandra Sensini | Alessandra Sensini |
| 7 | Ukraine | 2007 Worlds | 6 | Olha Maslivets | Olha Maslivets |
| 8 | France | 2007 Worlds | 7 | Charline Picon | Faustine Merret |
| — | Germany | 2007 Worlds | 9 | Romy Kinzl | |
| 9 | Great Britain | 2007 Worlds | 12 | Bryony Shaw | Bryony Shaw |
| 10 | Hong Kong | 2007 Worlds | 18 | Chan Wai Man | Chan Wai Kei |
| 11 | Greece | 2007 Worlds | 21 | Athina Frai | Athina Frai |
| 12 | Norway | 2007 Worlds | 27 | Jannicke Stålstrøm | Jannicke Stålstrøm |
| 13 | Finland | 2007 Worlds | 32 | Tuuli Petäjä | Tuuli Petäjä |
| 14 | Israel | 2007 Worlds | 33 | Maayan Davidovich | Maayan Davidovich |
| 15 | Japan | 2007 Worlds | 34 | Yuki Sunaga | Yasuko Kosuge |
| 16 | Bulgaria | 2007 Worlds | 35 | Irina Konstantinova | Irina Konstantinova |
| — | Belgium | 2007 Worlds | 38 | Sigrid Rondelez | |
| 17 | Canada | 2007 Worlds | 40 | Nikola Girke | Nikola Girke |
| 18 | Brazil | 2007 Worlds | 43 | Patrícia Freitas | Patrícia Freitas |
| 19 | Denmark | 2007 Worlds | 45 | Bettina Honoré | Bettina Honore |
| 20 | Thailand | 2008 Worlds | 39 | Napalai Tansai | Napalai Tansai |
| 21 | Mexico | 2008 Worlds | 50 | Demita Vega | Demita Vega |
| 22 | Hungary | 2008 Worlds | 53 | Diána Detre | Diána Detre |
| 23 | Argentina | 2008 Worlds | 58 | Florencia Gutiérrez | Florencia Gutiérrez |
| 24 | Russia | 2008 Worlds | 59 | Tatiana Bazyuk | Tatiana Bazyuk |
| 25 | United States | 2008 Worlds | 60 | Nancy Rios | Nancy Rios |
| 26 | Cyprus | 2008 Worlds | 61 | Gavriella Chatzidamianou | Gavriella Chatzidamianou |
| 27 | Turkey^{[u]} | 2008 Worlds | 69 | Sedef Köktentürk | Sedef Köktentürk |

=== One-person dinghy – Laser Radial ===
| # | Nation | Qualification Tournament | Place in Event | Sailor | Sailor at Games |
|---|---|---|---|---|---|
| 1 | China | Host Country | —N/a | —N/a | Xu Lijia |
| 2 | Belarus | 2007 Worlds | 1 | Tatiana Drozdovskaya | Tatiana Drozdovskaya |
| 3 | Finland | 2007 Worlds | 2 | Sari Multala | Tuula Tenkanen |
| 4 | Germany | 2007 Worlds | 3 | Petra Niemann | Petra Niemann |
| 5 | Poland | 2007 Worlds | 4 | Katarzyna Szotyńska | Katarzyna Szotyńska |
| 6 | United States | 2007 Worlds | 5 | Anna Tunnicliffe | Anna Tunnicliffe |
| 7 | Mexico | 2007 Worlds | 6 | Tania Elías Calles | Tania Elías Calles |
| 8 | Israel | 2007 Worlds | 7 | Nufar Edelman | Nufar Edelman |
| 9 | New Zealand | 2007 Worlds | 8 | Jo Aleh | Jo Aleh |
| 10 | Great Britain | 2007 Worlds | 10 | Charlotte Dobson | Penny Clark |
| 11 | France | 2007 Worlds | 11 | Sophie de Turckheim | Sarah Steyaert |
| 12 | Australia | 2007 Worlds | 12 | Krystal Weir | Sarah Blanck |
| 13 | Belgium | 2007 Worlds | 13 | Evi Van Acker | Evi Van Acker |
| 14 | Italy | 2007 Worlds | 14 | Larissa Nevierov | Larissa Nevierov |
| 15 | Canada | 2007 Worlds | 18 | Keamia Rasa | Lisa Ross |
| — | Netherlands | 2007 Worlds | 20 | Gea Jutjens | |
| 16 | Lithuania | 2007 Worlds | 21 | Gintarė Volungevičiūtė | Gintarė Volungevičiūtė |
| 17 | Switzerland | 2007 Worlds | 24 | Nathalie Brugger | Nathalie Brugger |
| 18 | Norway | 2007 Worlds | 27 | Elin Maria Samdal | Cathrine Gjerpen |
| 19 | Argentina | 2007 Worlds | 34 | Cecilia Carranza | Cecilia Carranza |
| 20 | Sweden | 2008 Worlds | 8 | Karin Söderström | Karin Söderström |
| 21 | Singapore | 2008 Worlds | 19 | Elizabeth Yin | Lo Man Yi |
| 22 | Spain | 2008 Worlds | 21 | Susana Romero | Susana Romero |
| 23 | Greece | 2008 Worlds | 25 | Efi Mantzaraki | Efi Mantzaraki |
| 24 | Croatia | 2008 Worlds | 27 | Mateja Petronijević | Mateja Petronijević |
| 25 | Ireland | 2008 Worlds | 29 | Ciara Peelo | Ciara Peelo |
| 26 | Russia^{[u]} | 2008 Worlds | 30 | Anastasiya Chernova | Anastasiya Chernova |
| 27 | Peru^{[u]} | 2008 Worlds | 58 | Paloma Schmidt | Paloma Schmidt |
| 28 | Paraguay | Tripartite | —N/a | —N/a | Florencia Cerutti |

=== Two-person dinghy – 470 ===
| # | Nation | Qualification Tournament | Place in Event | Sailor | Sailor at Games |
|---|---|---|---|---|---|
| 1 | China | Host Country | —N/a | —N/a | Wen Yimei; Yu Chunyan |
| 2 | Netherlands | 2007 Worlds | 1 | Marcelien de Koning; Lobke Berkhout | Marcelien de Koning; Lobke Berkhout |
| 3 | France | 2007 Worlds | 2 | Ingrid Petitjean; Nadège Douroux | Ingrid Petitjean; Gwendolyn Lemaitre |
| 4 | Great Britain | 2007 Worlds | 3 | Christina Bassadone; Saskia Clark | Christina Bassadone; Saskia Clark |
| 5 | Japan | 2007 Worlds | 4 | Ai Kondo; Naoko Kamata | Ai Kondo; Naoko Kamata |
| 6 | Sweden | 2007 Worlds | 5 | Therese Torgersson; Vendela Zachrisson-Santén | Therese Torgersson; Vendela Zachrisson-Santén |
| 7 | Italy | 2007 Worlds | 6 | Giulia Conti; Giovanna Micol | Giulia Conti; Giovanna Micol |
| 8 | Brazil | 2007 Worlds | 7 | Fernanda Oliveira; Isabel Swan | Fernanda Oliveira; Isabel Swan |
| 9 | Israel | 2007 Worlds | 8 | Nike Kornecki; Vered Buskila | Nike Kornecki; Vered Buskila |
| 10 | United States | 2007 Worlds | 10 | Erin Maxwell; Isabelle Kinsolving | Amanda Clark; Sara Mergenthaler |
| 11 | Slovenia | 2007 Worlds | 12 | Vesna Dekleva; Klara Maučec | Vesna Dekleva; Klara Maučec |
| 12 | Germany | 2007 Worlds | 14 | Stefanie Rothweiler; Vivien Kussatz | Stefanie Rothweiler; Vivien Kussatz |
| — | New Zealand | 2007 Worlds | 15 | Melinda Henshaw; Polly Powrie | |
| 13 | Australia | 2007 Worlds | 18 | Elise Rechichi; Tessa Parkinson | Elise Rechichi; Tessa Parkinson |
| 14 | Austria | 2008 Worlds | 6 | Sylvia Vogl; Carolina Flatscher | Sylvia Vogl; Carolina Flatscher |
| 15 | Argentina | 2008 Worlds | 9 | María Fernanda Sesto; Consuelo Monsegur | María Fernanda Sesto; Consuelo Monsegur |
| 16 | Spain | 2008 Worlds | 14 | Natalia Vía Dufresne; Laia Tutzó | Natalia Vía Dufresne; Laia Tutzó |
| 17 | Switzerland | 2008 Worlds | 21 | Emmanuelle Rol; Anne-Sophie Thilo | Emmanuelle Rol; Anne-Sophie Thilo |
| 18 | Czech Republic | 2008 Worlds | 22 | Lenka Šmídová; Lenka Mrzílková | Lenka Šmídová; Lenka Mrzílková |
| 19 | Singapore^{[u]} | 2008 Worlds | 39 | Toh Liying; Deborah Ong | Toh Liying; Deborah Ong |

=== Keelboat – Yngling ===
| # | Nation | Qualification Tournament | Place in Event | Sailor | Sailor at Games |
|---|---|---|---|---|---|
| 1 | China | Host Country | —N/a | —N/a | Song Xiaqun; Yu Yanli; Li Xiaoni |
| 2 | Great Britain | 2007 Worlds | 1 | Sarah Ayton; Sarah Webb; Pippa Wilson | Sarah Ayton; Sarah Webb; Pippa Wilson |
| 3 | United States | 2007 Worlds | 2 | Sally Barkow; Carrie Howe; Deborah Capozzi | Sally Barkow; Carrie Howe; Deborah Capozzi |
| 4 | Netherlands | 2007 Worlds | 4 | Mandy Mulder; Annemieke Bes; Flortje Hendriksen | Mandy Mulder; Annemieke Bes; Merel Witteveen |
| 5 | Russia | 2007 Worlds | 5 | Ekaterina Skudina; Diana Krutskikh; Natalia Ivanova | Ekaterina Skudina; Diana Krutskikh; Natalia Ivanova |
| — | New Zealand | 2007 Worlds | 6 | Sharon Ferris; Raynor Smeal; Shandy Buckley | |
| 6 | Spain | 2007 Worlds | 7 | Mónica Azón; Sandra Azón; Graciela Pisonero | Monica Azón; Sandra Azón; Graciela Pisonero |
| 7 | Germany | 2007 Worlds | 8 | Ulrike Schümann; Julia Bleck; Ute Höpfner | Ulrike Schümann; Julia Bleck; Ute Höpfner |
| 8 | Australia | 2007 Worlds | 10 | Nicky Bethwaite; Karyn Gojnich; Angela Farrell | Krystal Weir; Karyn Gojnich; Angela Farrell |
| 9 | Finland | 2007 Worlds | 11 | Silja Lehtinen; Maria Klemetz; Livia Väresmaa | Silja Lehtinen; Maria Klemetz; Livia Varesmaa |
| 10 | South Africa | 2007 Worlds | 12 | Dominique Provoyeur; Kim Rew; Penny Alison | Dominique Provoyeur; Kim Rew; Penny Alison |
| 11 | France | 2008 Worlds | 6 | Anne-Claire Le Berre; Marion Deplanque; Alice Ponsar | Anne le Helley; Catherine Lepesant; Julie Gerecht |
| 12 | Norway | 2008 Worlds | 10 | Siren Sundby; Lise Birgitte Fredriksen; Alexandra Koefoed | Siren Sundby; Lise Birgitte Fredriksen; Alexandra Koefoed |
| 13 | Greece | 2008 Worlds | 14 | Sofia Bekatorou; Sofia Papadopoulou; Christina Charamountani | Sofia Bekatorou; Sofia Papadopoulou; Virginia Kravarioti |
| 14 | Italy | 2008 Worlds | 19 | Chiara Calligaris; Francesca Scognamillo; Giulia Pignolo | Chiara Calligaris; Francesca Scognamillo; Giulia Pignolo |
| 15 | Canada^{[u]} | 2008 Worlds | 23 | Jennifer Provan; Martha Henderson; Katie Abbott | Jennifer Provan; Martha Henderson; Katie Abbott |

== Open events ==
=== Heavyweight one-person dinghy – Finn ===
| # | Nation | Qualification Tournament | Place in Event | Sailor | Sailor at Games |
|---|---|---|---|---|---|
| 1 | China | Host Country | —N/a | —N/a | Zhang Peng |
| 2 | Spain | 2007 Worlds | 1 | Rafael Trujillo | Rafael Trujillo |
| 3 | Netherlands | 2007 Worlds | 2 | Pieter-Jan Postma | Pieter-Jan Postma |
| 4 | Slovenia | 2007 Worlds | 3 | Gašper Vinčec | Gašper Vinčec |
| 5 | Denmark | 2007 Worlds | 4 | Jonas Høgh-Christensen | Jonas Høgh-Christensen |
| 6 | Greece | 2007 Worlds | 5 | Aimilios Papathanasiou | Aimilios Papathanasiou |
| 7 | Great Britain | 2007 Worlds | 6 | Edward Wright | Ben Ainslie |
| 8 | Canada | 2007 Worlds | 7 | Christopher Cook | Christopher Cook |
| 9 | Sweden | 2007 Worlds | 8 | Daniel Birgmark | Daniel Birgmark |
| 10 | Croatia | 2007 Worlds | 9 | Marin Mišura | Ivan Kljaković Gašpić |
| 11 | Australia | 2007 Worlds | 10 | Anthony Nossiter | Anthony Nossiter |
| 12 | Finland | 2007 Worlds | 12 | Tapio Nirkko | Tapio Nirkko |
| 13 | France | 2007 Worlds | 13 | Ismael Bruno | Guillaume Florent |
| 14 | New Zealand | 2007 Worlds | 16 | Dan Slater | Dan Slater |
| 15 | Poland | 2007 Worlds | 17 | Wacław Szukiel | Rafał Szukiel |
| 16 | United States | 2007 Worlds | 19 | Zach Railey | Zach Railey |
| 17 | Czech Republic | 2007 Worlds | 20 | Michael Maier | Michael Maier |
| 18 | Brazil | 2007 Worlds | 23 | João Signorini | Eduardo Couto |
| 19 | Ireland | 2007 Worlds | 25 | Tim Goodbody | Tim Goodbody |
| 20 | Norway | 2007 Worlds | 26 | Peer Moberg | Peer Moberg |
| 21 | Italy | 2008 Worlds | 19 | Giorgio Poggi | Giorgio Poggi |
| 22 | Russia | 2008 Worlds | 25 | Eduard Skornyakov | Eduard Skornyakov |
| 23 | Cyprus | 2008 Worlds | 29 | Haris Papadopoulos | Haris Papadopoulos |
| — | Austria | 2008 Worlds | 32 | Florian Raudaschl | |
| — | Germany | 2008 Worlds | 33 | Matthias Bohn | |
| 24 | Turkey | 2008 Worlds | 39 | Ali Kemal Tüfekçi | Ali Kemal Tüfekçi |
| 25 | India^{[u]} | 2008 Worlds | 52 | Nitin Mongia | Nachhatar Singh Johal |
| 26 | Venezuela^{[u]} | 2008 Worlds | 53 | Jhonny Bilbao | Jhonny Bilbao |

=== Skiff – 49er ===
| # | Nation | Qualification Tournament | Place in Event | Sailor | Sailor at Games |
|---|---|---|---|---|---|
| 1 | China | Host Country | —N/a | —N/a | Li Fei; Hu Xianqiang |
| 2 | Great Britain | 2007 Worlds | 1 | Stevie Morrison; Ben Rhodes | Stevie Morrison; Ben Rhodes |
| 3 | Austria | 2007 Worlds | 2 | Nico Delle Karth; Nikolaus Resch | Nico Delle-Karth; Nikolaus Resch |
| 4 | Australia | 2007 Worlds | 3 | Nathan Outteridge; Ben Austin | Nathan Outteridge; Ben Austin |
| 5 | Italy | 2007 Worlds | 4 | Pietro Sibello; Gianfranco Sibello | Pietro Sibello; Gianfranco Sibello |
| 6 | United States | 2007 Worlds | 5 | Morgan Larson; Pete Spaulding | Tim Wadlow; Chris Rast |
| 7 | Spain | 2007 Worlds | 6 | Federico Alonso; Arturo Alonso Tellechea | Iker Martínez; Xabier Fernández |
| 8 | France | 2007 Worlds | 7 | Morgan Lagravière; Stéphane Christidis | Emmanuel Dyen; Yann Rocherieux |
| 9 | Denmark | 2007 Worlds | 8 | Jonas Warrer; Martin Kirketerp | Jonas Warrer; Martin Kirketerp Ibsen |
| 10 | Germany | 2007 Worlds | 11 | Jan-Peter Peckolt; Hannes Peckolt | Jan Peter Peckolt; Hannes Peckolt |
| 11 | Ukraine | 2007 Worlds | 14 | Rodion Luka; George Leonchuk | Rodion Luka; George Leonchuk |
| 12 | Poland | 2007 Worlds | 17 | Marcin Czajkowski; Krzysztof Kierkowski | Marcin Czajkowski; Krzysztof Kierkowski |
| 13 | Portugal | 2007 Worlds | 18 | Jorge Lima; Francisco Andrade | Jorge Lima; Francisco Andrade |
| 14 | Canada | 2007 Worlds | 19 | Gordon Cook; Ben Remocker | Gordon Cook; Ben Remocker |
| 15 | Brazil | 2008 Worlds | 11 | André Fonseca; Rodrigo Duarte | André Fonseca; Rodrigo Duarte |
| 16 | Norway | 2008 Worlds | 17 | Christopher Gundersen; Frode Bovim | Christopher Gundersen; Frode Bovim |
| 17 | Sweden | 2008 Worlds | 25 | Jonas Lindberg; Kalle Torlén | Jonas Lindberg; Kalle Torlén |
| 18 | Japan | 2008 Worlds | 27 | Akira Ishibashi; Yukio Makino | Akira Ishibashi; Yukio Makino |
| 19 | Croatia | 2008 Worlds | 29 | Pavle Kostov; Petar Cupać | Pavle Kostov; Petar Cupać |

=== Multihull – Tornado ===
| # | Nation | Qualification Tournament | Place in Event | Sailor | Sailor at Games |
|---|---|---|---|---|---|
| 1 | China | Host Country | —N/a | —N/a | Luo Youjia; Chen Xiuke |
| 2 | Spain | 2007 Worlds | 1 | Fernando Echávarri; Antón Paz | Fernando Echávarri; Antón Paz |
| 3 | Belgium | 2007 Worlds | 2 | Carolijn Brouwer; Sébastien Godefroid | Carolijn Brouwer; Sébastien Godefroid |
| 4 | Netherlands | 2007 Worlds | 3 | Mitch Booth; Pim Nieuwenhuis | Mitch Booth; Pim Nieuwenhuis |
| 5 | Australia | 2007 Worlds | 4 | Darren Bundock; Glenn Ashby | Darren Bundock; Glenn Ashby |
| 6 | Great Britain | 2007 Worlds | 5 | Leigh McMillan; Will Howden | Leigh McMillan; Will Howden |
| 7 | France | 2007 Worlds | 6 | Xavier Revil; Christophe Espagnon | Xavier Revil; Christophe Espagnon |
| 8 | Greece | 2007 Worlds | 7 | Iordanis Paschalidis; Konstantinos Trigonis | Iordanis Paschalidis; Konstantinos Trigonis |
| 9 | United States | 2007 Worlds | 10 | John Lovell; Charlie Ogletree | John Lovell; Charlie Ogletree |
| 10 | Italy | 2007 Worlds | 11 | Francesco Marcolini; Edoardo Bianchi | Francesco Marcolini; Edoardo Bianchi |
| 11 | Germany | 2007 Worlds | 13 | Johannes Polgar; Florian Spalteholz | Johannes Polgar; Florian Spalteholz |
| 12 | Argentina | 2007 Worlds | 14 | Santiago Lange; Carlos Espínola | Santiago Lange; Carlos Espínola |
| 13 | Canada | 2008 Worlds | 2 | Oskar Johansson; Kevin Stittle | Oskar Johansson; Kevin Stittle |
| 14 | Austria | 2008 Worlds | 11 | Roman Hagara; Hans-Peter Steinacher | Roman Hagara; Hans Peter Steinacher |
| — | New Zealand | 2008 Worlds | 12 | Aaron McIntosh; Mark Kennedy | |
| 15 | Ukraine^{[u]} | 2008 Worlds | 16 | Pavlo Kalynchev; Andriy Shafranyuk | Pavlo Kalynchev; Andriy Shafranyuk |
