= Sailing at the 2008 Summer Olympics – Tornado =

Mixed Tornado at the Games of the XXIX Olympiad
- Line drawing of the Tornado
- Venue: Qingdao International Sailing Centre
- Dates: First race: 15 August 2008; Last race: 21 August 2008
- Competitors: 30 from 15 nations
- Teams: 15 boats

Medalists
1st place, gold medalist(s)		Antón Paz; Fernando Echávarri	Spain
2nd place, silver medalist(s)		Darren Bundock; Glenn Ashby	Australia
3rd place, bronze medalist(s)		Santiago Lange; Carlos Espínola	Argentina

The Mixed Tornado was a sailing event on the Sailing at the 2008 Summer Olympics program in Qingdao International Sailing Centre. Eleven races (last one a medal race) were scheduled and completed. 30 sailors, on 15 boats, from 15 nations competed. Ten boats qualified for the medal race.

== Race schedule ==
●	Practice race	●	Race on Yellow	●	Race on Pink	●	Medal race on Yellow

Date	August																	
Date	7 Thu	8 Fri	9 Sat	10 Sun	11 Mon	12 Tue	13 Wed	14 Thu	15 Fri	16 Sat	17 Sun	18 Mon	19 Tue	20 Wed	21 Thu	22 Fri	23 Sat	24 Sun
Scheduled
Actual								PR	S1	S2,3	S4	S5,6,7	No wind	S9,10,11	MR			

== Course areas and course configurations ==
For the Tornado course areas A (Yellow) and E (Pink) were used. The location (36°1'26"’N, 120°26'52"E) points to the center of the 0.6nm radius Yellow course area and the location (36°2'44"N, 120°28'9"E) points to the center of the 0.75nm radius Pink course area. The target time for the course was about 60 minutes for the races and 30 minutes for the medal race. The race management could choose from several course configurations.

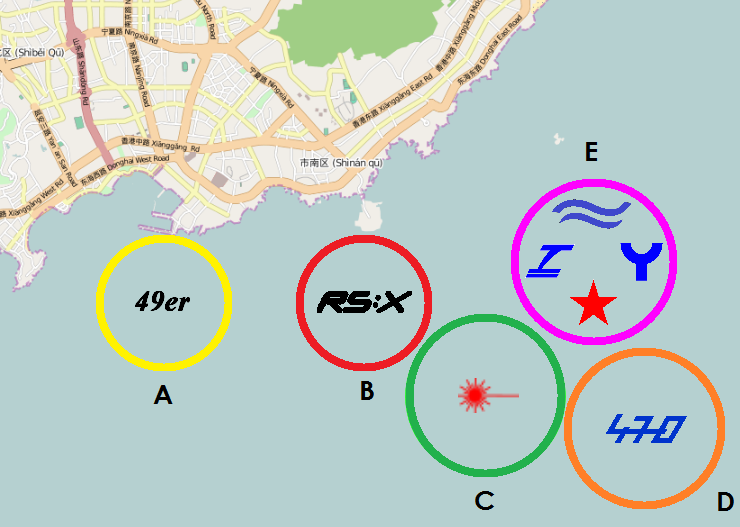
Course Areas

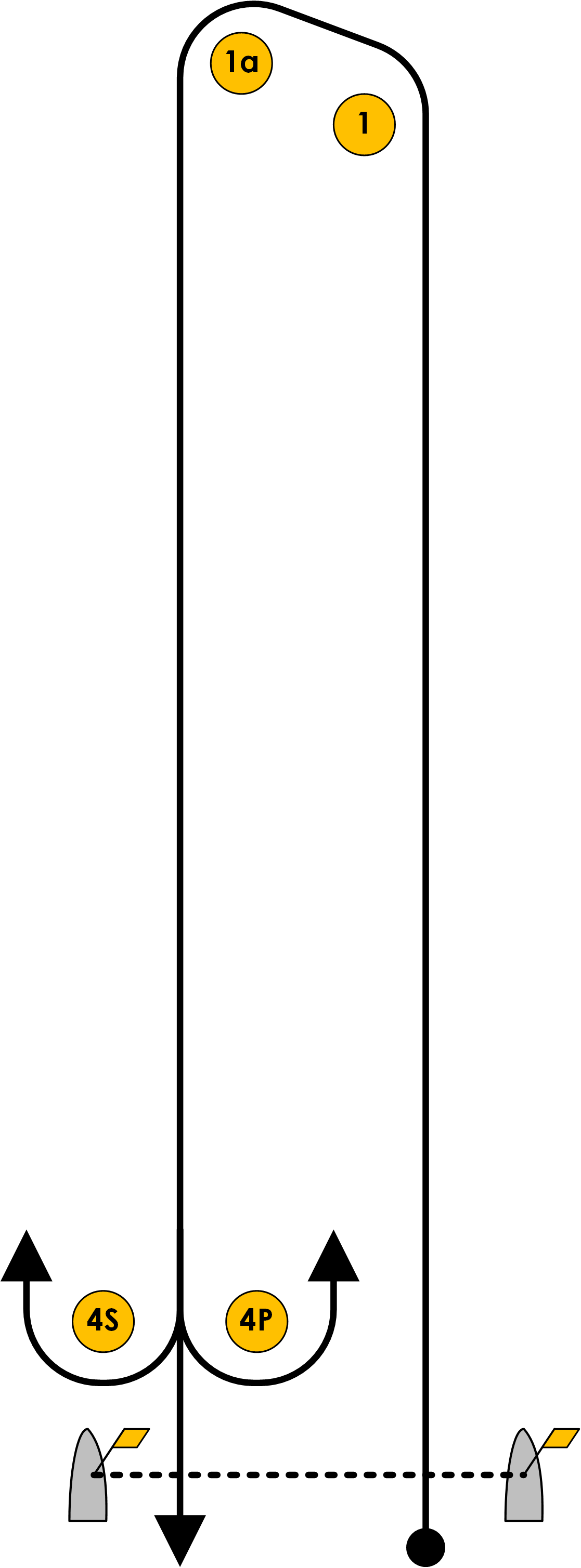
Windward - Leeward Course (W)

=== Windward-leeward courses ===
- W2: Start – 1 – 1a – 4s/4p – 1 – 1a – Finish
- W3: Start – 1 – 1a – 4s/4p – 1 – 1a – 4s/4p – 1 – 1a – Finish
- W4: Start – 1 – 1a – 4s/4p – 1 – 1a – 4s/4p – 1 – 1a – 4s/4p – 1 – 1a – Finish

== Weather conditions ==
In the lead up to the Olympics many questioned the choice of Qingdao as a venue with very little predicted wind. During the races the wind was pretty light and quite unpredictable. For the Tornado competition several races had to be postponed to the next day and the spare day had to be used.

== Final results ==
Rank	Country	Helmsman	Crew	Race 1		Race 2		Race 3		Race 4		Race 5		Race 6		Race 7		Race 8		Race 9		Race 10		Medalrace		Total	Total – discard
Rank	Country	Helmsman	Crew	Pos.	Pts.	Pos.	Pts.	Pos.	Pts.	Pos.	Pts.	Pos.	Pts.	Pos.	Pts.	Pos.	Pts.	Pos.	Pts.	Pos.	Pts.	Pos.	Pts.	Pos.	Pts.	Total	Total – discard
1st place, gold medalist(s)	Spain	Fernando Echávarri	Antón Paz	1	1.0	6	6.0	1	1.0	4	4.0	7	7.0	~~13~~	~~13.0~~	1	1.0	7	7.0	1	1.0	8	8.0	4	8.0	57.0	44.0
2nd place, silver medalist(s)	Australia	Darren Bundock	Glenn Ashby	5	5.0	4	4.0	3	3.0	1	1.0	5	5.0	~~9~~	~~9.0~~	2	2.0	8	8.0	7	7.0	4	4.0	5	10.0	58.0	49.0
3rd place, bronze medalist(s)	Argentina	Santiago Lange	Carlos Espínola	~~13~~	~~13.0~~	1	1.0	1	1.0	12	12.0	4	4.0	6	6.0	9	9.0	1	1.0	9	9.0	1	1.0	6	12.0	69.0	56.0
4	Canada	Oskar Johansson	Kevin Stittle	8	8.0	3	3.0	9	9.0	9	9.0	1	1.0	~~15~~	~~15.0~~	11	11.0	12	12.0	2	2.0	2	2.0	2	4.0	76.0	61.0
5	Netherlands	Mitch Booth	Pim Nieuwenhuis	3	3.0	~~13~~	~~13.0~~	8	8.0	3	3.0	10	10.0	2	2.0	8	8.0	3	3.0	11	11.0	10	10.0	3	6.0	77.0	64.0
6	Great Britain	Leigh McMillan	Will Howden	6	6.0	8	8.0	13	13.0	8	8.0	~~14~~	~~14.0~~	7	7.0	7	7.0	2	2.0	3	3.0	12	12.0	1	2.0	82.0	68.0
7	Italy	Francesco Marcolini	Edoardo Bianchi	~~15~~	~~15.0~~	9	9.0	4	4.0	2	2.0	8	8.0	4	4.0	6	6.0	11	11.0	8	8.0	6	6.0	8	16.0	89.0	74.0
8	Germany	Johannes Polgar	Florian Spalteholz	10	10.0	7	7.0	11	11.0	5	5.0	6	6.0	1	1.0	5	5.0	~~13~~	~~13.0~~	4	4.0	3	3.0	22	22.0	87.0	74.0
9	Austria	Roman Hagara	Hans-Peter Steinacher	12	12.0	10	10.0	~~14~~	~~14.0~~	10	10.0	11	11.0	3	3.0	3	3.0	9	9.0	5	5.0	5	5.0	7	14.0	96.0	82.0
10	Greece	Iordanis Paschalidis	Konstantinos Trigkonis	2	2.0	5	5.0	12	12.0	7	7.0	2	2.0	12	12.0	4	4.0	10	10.0	6	6.0	~~13~~	~~13.0~~	22	22.0	95.0	82.0
11	France	Xavier Revil	Christophe Espagnon	7	7.0	2	2.0	10	10.0	~~DNC~~	~~16.0~~	9	9.0	10	10.0	10	10.0	4	4.0	10	10.0	7	7.0	-	-	85.0	69.0
12	Belgium	Carolijn Brouwer	Sébastien Godefroid	11	11.0	11	11.0	5	5.0	6	6.0	3	3.0	8	8.0	13	13.0	6	6.0	~~DNF~~	~~16.0~~	9	9.0	-	-	88.0	72.0
13	Ukraine	Pavlo Kalynchev	Andriy Shafranyuk	4	4.0	~~15~~	~~15.0~~	6	6.0	13	13.0	15	15.0	11	11.0	12	12.0	14	14.0	13	13.0	11	11.0	-	-	114.0	99.0
14	China	Luo Youjia	Chen Xiuke	9	9.0	14	14.0	~~OCS~~	~~16.0~~	DNF	16.0	13	13.0	5	5.0	14	14.0	5	5.0	12	12.0	14	14.0	-	-	118.0	102.0
15	United States	John Lovell	Charlie Ogletree	14	14.0	12	12.0	7	7.0	11	11.0	12	12.0	14	14.0	~~15~~	~~15.0~~	15	15.0	14	14.0	15	15.0	-	-	129.0	114.0

Legend: – Qualified for next phase; DNC – Did not come to the starting area; DNF – Did not finish; OCS – On the course side of the starting line;
Discard is crossed out and does not count for the overall result.

== Daily standings ==
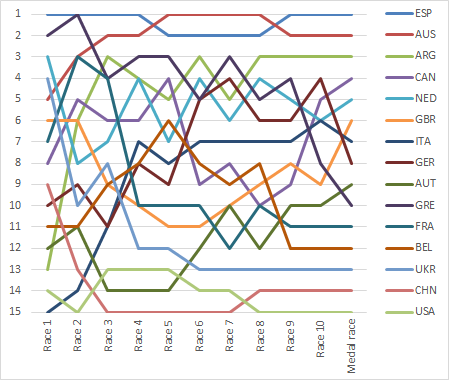
Graph showing the daily standings in the Tornado during the 2008 Summer Olympics
