= Susana Romero =

Susana Romero may refer to:

- Susana Romero (actress) (born 1958), Argentine actress
- Susana Romero (sailor) (born 1990), Spanish sailor
