= Sailing at the 2002 Asian Games – Women's 420 =

Women's 420 at the 2002 Asian Games
- Venue: Busan Yachting Center
- Date: 3–9 October 2002
- Competitors: 14 from 7 nations

Medalists
gold medal	Wang Yan; Song Xiaqun	China
silver medal	Kim Suk-kyong; Her Jung-eun	South Korea
bronze medal	Toh Liying; Joan Huang	Singapore

The women's 420 competition at the 2002 Asian Games in Busan was held from 3 to 9 October 2002.

== Schedule ==
All times are Korea Standard Time (UTC+09:00)

Date	Time	Event
Thursday, 3 October 2002	11:00	Race 1
Thursday, 3 October 2002	14:00	Race 2
Friday, 4 October 2002	11:00	Race 3
Saturday, 5 October 2002	10:00	Race 4
Saturday, 5 October 2002	11:00	Race 5
Saturday, 5 October 2002	14:00	Race 6
Monday, 7 October 2002	11:00	Race 7
Tuesday, 8 October 2002	10:00	Race 8
Tuesday, 8 October 2002	11:00	Race 9
Wednesday, 9 October 2002	11:00	Race 10
Wednesday, 9 October 2002	14:00	Race 11

== Results ==
Legend

- DSQ — Disqualification

Rank	Team	Race											Total
Rank	Team	1	2	3	4	5	6	7	8	9	10	11	Total
1st place, gold medalist(s)	China (CHN); Wang Yan; Song Xiaqun	1	1	~~(8)~~; DSQ	4	1	2	2	5	1	X	X	17
2nd place, silver medalist(s)	South Korea (KOR); Kim Suk-kyong; Her Jung-eun	4	4	1	2	2	~~(5)~~	4	3	4	X	X	24
3rd place, bronze medalist(s)	Singapore (SIN); Toh Liying; Joan Huang	3	3	4	3	4	3	~~(5)~~	4	3	X	X	27
4	Thailand (THA); Wandee Vongtim; Yupa Suwannawat	2	2	3	5	3	1	6	6	~~(7)~~	X	X	28
5	Myanmar (MYA); Su Myat Soe; Nan Kham Say	6	~~(7)~~	2	1	5	6	1	2	6	X	X	29
6	Malaysia (MAS); Winnie Abah; Patricia Kelly Yin	5	5	5	~~(7)~~	6	4	7	1	2	X	X	35
7	India (IND); Riddhi Jani; Aditi Jani	~~(7)~~	6	6	6	7	7	3	7	5	X	X	47
