= Sailing at the 2005 Summer Universiade =

Sailing competition

Sailing at the XXIII Summer Universiade
- Venue: Karşıyaka Yelken Tesisleri, Karşıyaka
- Dates: 15-20 August

Sailing was contested at the 2005 Summer Universiade in Karşıyaka, Turkey.

== Medal summary ==
* Host nation (Turkey)

Rank	Nation	Gold	Silver	Bronze	Total
1	France (FRA)	3	0	1	4
2	Poland (POL)	1	2	0	3
3	United States (USA)	1	1	0	2
4	Germany (GER)	1	0	2	3
5	Croatia (CRO)	1	0	0	1
6	Italy (ITA)	0	1	1	2
7	Belarus (BLR)	0	1	0	1
7	Japan (JPN)	0	1	0	1
7	Turkey (TUR)*	0	1	0	1
10	Australia (AUS)	0	0	1	1
10	Switzerland (SUI)	0	0	1	1
10	Ukraine (UKR)	0	0	1	1
Totals (12 entries)		7	7	7	21

== Medallists ==
Event	Gold	Silver	Bronze
Men's 470	Šime Fantela; Igor Marenić (CRO)	Sergey Desukevich; Pavel Logunov (BLR)	Tobias Etter; Felix Steiger (SUI)
Men's Laser	Andrew Campbell (USA)	Kemal Muslubaş (TUR)	Johan Cechosz (FRA)
Men's Mistral	Fabrice Hassen (FRA)	Piotr Myszka (POL)	Toni Wilhelm (GER)
Women's 470	Camille Lecointre; Gwendolyn Cemaitre (FRA)	Reiko Takahashi; Naoko Kamata (JPN)	Elisabetta Saccheggiani; Myriam Cutolo (ITA)
Women's Radial Laser	Katarzyna Szotyńska (POL)	Anna Tunnicliffe (USA)	Krystal Weir (AUS)
Women's Mistral	Romy Kinzl (GER)	Flavia Tartaglini (ITA)	Olha Maslivets (UKR)
Mixed Team	France (FRA)	Poland (POL)	Germany (GER)

== Sources ==
- Sailing results at the 2005 Summer Universiade
