= Ana Barbachan =

Brazilian sailor

Personal information
- Full name: Ana Luiza Busato Barbachan
- Born: 15 August 1989 (age 35); Porto Alegre, Brazil

Sport
- Country: Sailing

Ana Luiza Busato Barbachan (born 15 August 1989 in Porto Alegre) is a Brazilian sports sailor. She was chosen by Olympic medalist Fernanda Oliveira to be her new partner in the 470 class after Oliveira's 2009 split with Isabel Swan. Barbachan has since competed with Oliveira at three Olympic Games, London 2012 (finishing 6th), Rio 2016 (finishing 8th). and Tokyo 2020 (9th).
