= Angela Farrell (sailor) =

Australian sailor

Personal information
- Born: 20 September 1981 (age 44) Sydney, New South Wales, Australia
- Height: 167 cm (5 ft 6 in)

Sport
- Country: Australia

Sailing career
- Club: Royal Prince Alfred Yacht Club

Angela Farrell (born 20 September 1981) is an Australian sailor who represented Australia at the 2008 Beijing Olympics.

Farrell competed in the three-person keelboat (Yngling) event with skipper Krystal Weir and fellow crew Karyn Gojnich. Their best performance was a win in the first race and they finished tenth overall.
