= Anastasiya Chernova =

Russian sailor (born 1981)

Personal information
- Full name: Anastasiya Igorevna Chernova
- Nationality: Russia
- Born: 23 November 1981 (age 44) Togliatti, Samara Oblast, Russian SFSR, Soviet Union
- Height: 1.72 m (5 ft 7 1/2 in)
- Weight: 70 kg (154 lb)

Sailing career
- Sport: Sailing
- Club: ShVSM
- Coached by: Igor Maletin
- Class: Dinghy

Anastasiya Igorevna Chernova (Russian: Анастасия Игоревна Чернова; born 23 November 1981) is a Russian former sailor, who specialized in the Laser Radial class. A two-time national champion, she represented her country Russia at the 2008 Summer Olympics, finishing outside the top 25 in her signature fleet. Serving as a member of the sailing roster at ShVSM Samara, Chernova trained throughout her competitive sporting career under the tutelage of her father Igor Maletin. Currently, she is the head coach of the country's youth sailing squad.

Chernova competed for the Russian sailing squad in the inaugural Laser Radial class at the 2008 Summer Olympics in Beijing. Building up to her Olympic selection, she formally accepted a berth forfeited by the Netherlands, as the next highest-ranked sailor vying for qualification, based on the results at the Worlds five months earlier in Auckland, New Zealand. Chernova started the race series comfortably with a top-ten mark but slowly faded down her stretch towards the sterns of the fleet on the last leg, ending her in the penultimate position out of 28 entrants with 168 net points. Furthermore, Chernova's overall score spared her from the rear end of the field by a massive 34-point edge over Norway's Cathrine Gjerpen.
