= Sergei Desukevich =

Belarusian sailor (born 1983)

Personal information
- Full name: Sergey Leonidovich Desyukevich
- Nationality: Belarusian
- Born: 26 January 1983 (age 43) Minsk, Belarusian SSR, Soviet Union
- Height: 1.80 m (5 ft 11 in)
- Weight: 68 kg (150 lb)

Sailing career
- Sport: Sailing
- Club: Dynamo Minsk
- Class: Dinghy
Medal record
Men's sailing
Representing Belarus
Summer Universiade
Silver medal – second place	2005 İzmir	470

Sergey Leonidovich Desyukevich (Belarusian: Сяргей Леанідавіч Дзесюкевіч; born 26 January 1983) is a Belarusian former sailor, who specialized in the two-person dinghy (470) class. Together with his partner Pavel Logunov, he won a silver medal in the men's 470 at the 2005 Summer Universiade in İzmir, Turkey and was eventually named one of the country's top sailors in his pet event for the 2008 Summer Olympics, finishing in a lowly twenty-first place.

Desukevich competed for the Belarusian sailing squad, as a skipper in the men's 470 class, at the 2008 Summer Olympics in Beijing. Building up to their Olympic selection, he and crew member Logunov finished a satisfying fourteenth to secure one of the twenty quota places offered at the 2007 ISAF Worlds in Cascais, Portugal. The Belarusian duo clearly struggled to catch a vast fleet of world sailors under windy conditions in the initial half of the series, until they found solace to attain a blistering runner-up mark on the seventh leg. Another set of substandard outcomes towards the final half, however, pushed both Desukevich and Logunov to the middle of the 29-boat fleet, sitting them in twenty-first overall with 159 net points.
