= Isabel Swan =

Brazilian sailor

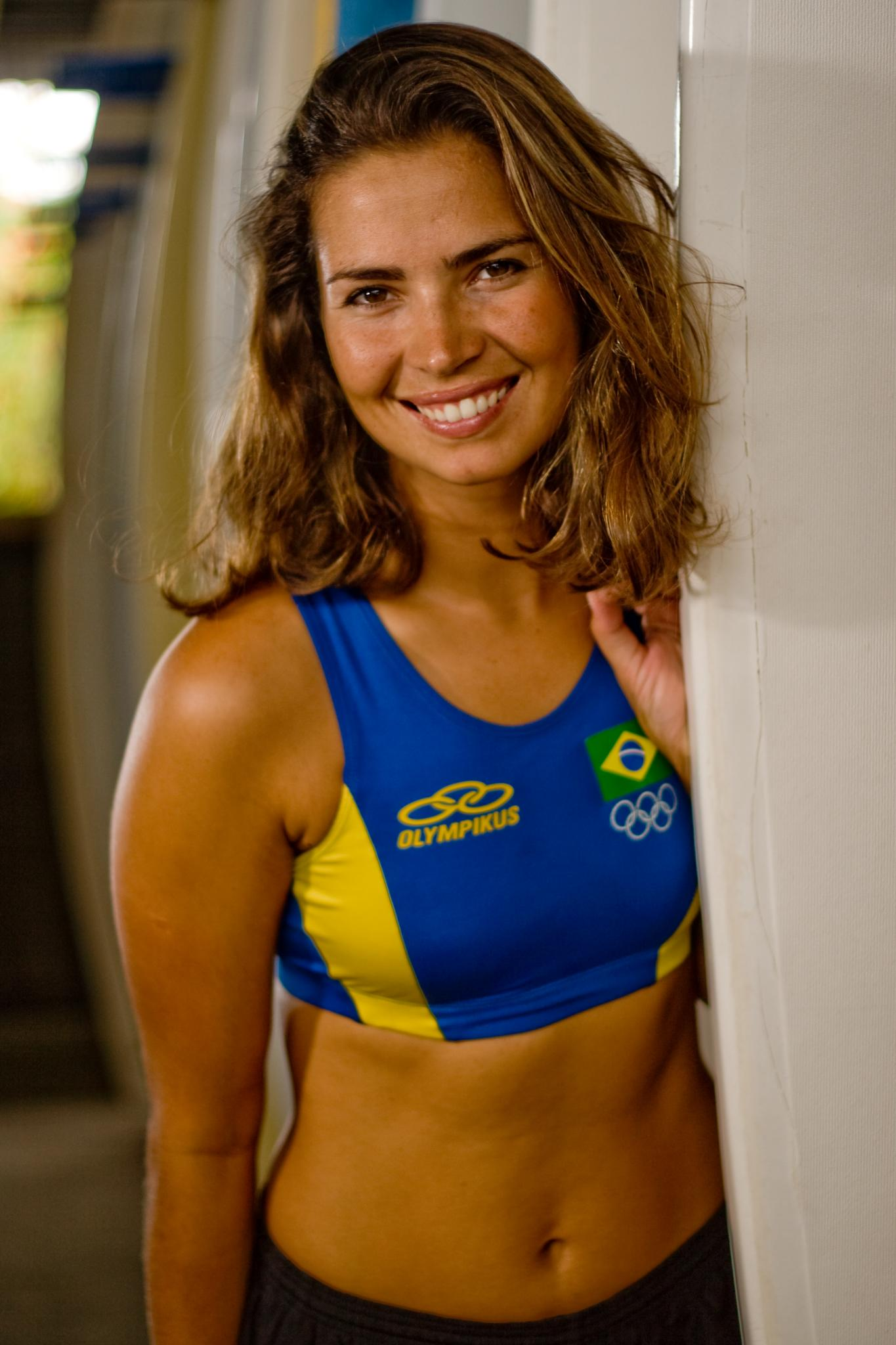
- Swan in 2009

Personal information
- Full name: Isabel Marques Swan
- Born: November 18, 1983 (age 42) Rio de Janeiro, Brazil

Sailing career
- Sport: Sailing
- Class: 470
Medal record
Women's sailing
Representing Brazil
Olympic Games
Bronze medal – third place	2008 Beijing	470 class
Universiade
Bronze medal – third place	2011 Shenzhen	Team 470

Isabel Marques Swan (born November 18, 1983) is a Brazilian sailor. She won a bronze medal in 470 class at the 2008 Summer Olympics.

Born in Rio de Janeiro and raised in Niterói, she started sailing at the age of 8, influenced by her father, with whom she would compete in the 1998 Tornado World Championship, and her aunt and godmother Cláudia Swan, who was the first Brazilian female sailor in the Olympics, in 1992. In 2004, Fernanda Oliveira, who had just competed in the 2004 Summer Olympics, invited Swan to sail with her in the 470 class, a partnership that led to Brazil's first female medal in sailing. Afterwards Swan tried to compete in the Laser Radial before returning to the 470 partnering Martine Grael. After losing the 2012 Summer Olympics spot to Oliveira and Ana Barbachan, Swan and Grael parted ways, with the latter moving onto the 49er FX class and Swan calling Renata Decnop to be her new partner. After losing to Oliveira and Barbachan again in the qualifiers for the 2016 Summer Olympics, Swan changed classes to the Nacra 17 in 2014, and alongside Samuel Albrecht, eventually earned her spot in the Olympic competition, where she finished tenth.

Swan returned in the 2024 Summer Olympics, competing at the 470 partnering Henrique Haddad. She also announced she would run for vice-mayor of Niterói, as running mate to Rodrigo Neves, in the 2024 Brazilian municipal elections.

A social communication graduate from Fluminense Federal University, Swan was also one of the embassadors who spoke for the Rio de Janeiro bid for the 2016 Summer Olympics in the 121st IOC Session.
