= Ali Kemal Tüfekçi =

Turkish sailor

Personal information
- Nickname: Sensey
- Nationality: Turkey
- Born: 8 September 1973 (age 52) Rize, Turkey
- Height: 1.83 m (6 ft 0 in)
- Weight: 95 kg (209 lb)

Sailing career
- Sport: Sailing
- Club: İstanbul Yelken Kulübü
- Coached by: Tolga Rangavis
- Class: Dinghy

Ali Kemal Tüfekçi (born 8 September 1973) is a Turkish former sailor, who specialized in the Laser and Finn classes. He represented his country Turkey in the single-handed boat at the 2000 Summer Olympics, before switching to a heavyweight version on his second trip to Beijing 2008. Tüfekçi trained throughout his sporting career for Istanbul Sailing Club (Turkish: İstanbul Yelken Kulübü).

Tüfekçi made his Olympic debut in Sydney 2000, sailing in the Laser class. There, he accumulated a net grade of 254 points to take a lowly thirty-fourth overall spot out of 43 entrants at the end of the eleven-race series.

Tüfekçi sought to bid for his second consecutive trip to the Games in Athens 2004, but he lost to the newcomer and eventual two-time Olympian Kemal Muslubaş based on the federation's selection criteria.

Eight years after his maiden Games, Tüfekçi gained some weight and thereby moved to the larger Finn class for the 2008 Summer Olympics in Beijing. Building up to his Olympic selection, he finished thirty-ninth overall out of 50 sailors in the golden fleet to secure the last of six quota spots available at the Finn Gold Cup nearly seven months earlier in Melbourne, Australia. Coming from behind of the fleet with scores lower than the tenth position, Tüfekçi charged his way to the left for a credible top-six mark on the seventh leg. Tüfekçi's best result, however, was not enough to put him through to the medal race, sitting him in the twentieth overall spot with 107 net points.
