= María Fernanda Sesto =

Argentine sailor

María Fernanda Sesto (born 8 October 1976 in Buenos Aires) is an Argentine sports sailor. She has competed at the 2000, 2004, 2008 and 2012 Summer Olympics.

At the 2000 Summer Olympics, she teamed with Paula Reinoso in the women's 470 class, finishing in 12th place. The same pairing took 12th at the 2004 Olympic Games also.

At the 2008 Summer Olympics, she teamed with Consuelo Monsegur in the same class and finished in 16th place. The same pairing took 13th place at the 2012 Olympic Games.
