= Karl Torlén =

Swedish sailor

Personal information
- Full name: Karl Magnus Torlén
- Nationality: Swedish
- Born: 25 September 1985 (age 40) Nacka, Sweden

Sport

Sailing career
- Class: 49er
- Club: Royal Gothenburg Yacht Club

Karl Magnus Torlén (born 25 September 1985) is a Swedish sailor competing for GKSS. He finished 18th in the 2008 Summer Olympics in the 49er class together with Jonas Lindberg.

Karl Torlén was born in Nacka, Sweden on 25 September 1985.
