= Haris Papadopoulos =

Cypriot sailor (born 1983)

Personal information
- Nationality: Cyprus
- Born: 26 October 1983 (age 42)
- Height: 1.89 m (6 ft 2 1/2 in)
- Weight: 90 kg (198 lb)

Sailing career
- Sport: Sailing
- Club: Famagusta Nautical Club
- Class(es): Laser, Finn

Haris Papadopoulos (Greek: Χάρης Παπαδόπουλος; born 26 October 1983) is a Cypriot dinghy sailor, who specialized in the Laser and Finn classes. As of October 2012, he is ranked no. 50 in the world for the Finn class by the International Sailing Federation.

Papadopoulos made his official debut for the 2004 Summer Olympics in Athens, where he placed twenty-eighth out of forty-two sailors in the open laser class by one point shorter of his record from Canada's Bernard Luttmer, attaining a net score of 244.

Four years after competing in his last Olympics, Papadopoulos qualified for his second Cypriot team, as a 24-year-old, at the 2008 Summer Olympics in Beijing, by finishing twenty-ninth from the Finn Gold Cup in Melbourne, Australia. He placed twenty-second in the preliminary races of the open Finn class, by three points larger of his record from Ireland's Tim Goodbody, with a net score of 115 points.
