= Yukio Makino =

Japanese sailor (born 1980)

Yukio Makino (牧野 幸雄, Makino Yukio, born May 6, 1980) is a Japanese sailor. He belongs to Toyota Motor East Japan.

== Life and career ==
Makino was born in Kumamoto Prefecture, Japan, on May 6, 1980. He graduated from Ritsumeikan University in Kyoto.

In 2008, he participated at the 2008 Summer Olympics, and placed 12th in 49er class.

In the men's 49er class at the 2012 Summer Olympics, he placed 18th.

At the 2016 Rio Olympics, he paired up with Kenji Takahashi in men's 49er class, and placed 18th.
