= Florian Spalteholz =

German sailor

Personal information
- Full name: Florian Spalteholz
- Nationality: Germany
- Born: 4 March 1977 (age 49) Hamburg, West Germany
- Height: 1.77 m (5 ft 9 1/2 in)
- Weight: 70 kg (154 lb)

Sailing career
- Sport: Sailing
- Club: Norddeutscher Regatta Verein
- Coached by: Rigo de Nijs (NOR)
- Class: Multihull

Florian Spalteholz (born 4 March 1977) is a German former sailor who specialized in the multihull (Tornado) class. Together with his partner Johannes Polgar, he was named one of the country's top sailors in the mixed multihull catamaran for the 2008 Summer Olympics, finishing in eighth place. A member of North German Regatta Club (German: Norddeutscher Regatta Verein), Spalteholz trained for most of his competitive sailing career under the tutelage of his Norwegian-born personal coach Rigo de Nijs.

Spalteholz competed for the German sailing squad as a 31-year-old skipper in the Tornado class at the 2008 Summer Olympics in Beijing. Leading up to their maiden Games, he and skipper Polgar topped the selection criteria in a duel against brothers Tino and Niko Mittelmeier for the country's Tornado berth, based on their cumulative scores attained at two international regattas stipulated by the German Sailing Federation (German: Deutscher Segler Verband). The German duo started off the race series in the middle of the fleet until shifty wind conditions propelled them to the front in the final half, with a single victory and a triad of top-five marks, making both Spalteholz and Polgar eligible for the medal race. An unforeseen capsize by the German duo on the initial run, however, caused their medal chances to vanish, dropping them to eighth overall with 74 net points.
