= Sailing at the 2006 Asian Games – Women's 470 =

Women's 470 at the 2006 Asian Games
- Venue: Doha Sailing Club
- Date: 5–13 December 2006
- Competitors: 8 from 4 nations

Medalists
gold medal	Ai Kondo; Naoko Kamata	Japan
silver medal	Toh Liying; Elizabeth Tan	Singapore
bronze medal	Yu Chunyan; Wen Yimei	China

The women's 470 competition at the 2006 Asian Games in Doha was held from 5 to 13 December 2006.

== Schedule ==
All times are Arabia Standard Time (UTC+03:00)

Date	Time	Event
Tuesday, 5 December 2006	11:00	Race 1
Wednesday, 6 December 2006	11:00	Race 2
Thursday, 7 December 2006	11:00	Race 3
Thursday, 7 December 2006	11:00	Race 4
Thursday, 7 December 2006	11:00	Race 5
Friday, 8 December 2006	11:00	Race 6
Friday, 8 December 2006	11:00	Race 7
Friday, 8 December 2006	11:00	Race 8
Sunday, 10 December 2006	11:00	Race 9
Sunday, 10 December 2006	11:00	Race 10
Monday, 11 December 2006	11:00	Race 11
Wednesday, 13 December 2006	11:00	Race 12

== Results ==
Legend

- DNF — Did not finish

Rank	Team	Race												Total
Rank	Team	1	2	3	4	5	6	7	8	9	10	11	12	Total
1st place, gold medalist(s)	Japan (JPN); Ai Kondo; Naoko Kamata	1	1	1	~~(4)~~	1	1	1	1	1	1	1	1	11
2nd place, silver medalist(s)	Singapore (SIN); Toh Liying; Elizabeth Tan	2	2	2	1	~~(4)~~	3	3	3	3	2	3	2	26
3rd place, bronze medalist(s)	China (CHN); Yu Chunyan; Wen Yimei	3	3	~~(5)~~; DNF	2	2	2	2	2	2	3	2	4	27
4	Myanmar (MYA); Chit Su; Nwe Nwe San	~~(4)~~	4	3	3	3	4	4	4	4	4	4	3	40
