= Christophe Espagnon =

French sailor (born 1976)

Personal information
- Nationality: France
- Born: 6 January 1976 (age 50) Talence, France
- Height: 1.75 m (5 ft 9 in)
- Weight: 79 kg (174 lb)

Sailing career
- Sport: Sailing
- Club: Société des Régates Rochelaises
- Coached by: Philippe Neiras
- Class: Multihull
Medal record
Men's sailing
Representing France
World Championships
Bronze medal – third place	2005 La Rochelle	Tornado

Christophe Espagnon (born 6 January 1976) is a French sailor, who specialized in the multihull (Tornado) class. Together with his partner Xavier Revil, he was named one of the country's top sailors in the mixed multihull catamaran for the 2008 Summer Olympics, finishing in a distant eleventh position. Outside his Olympic career, he and Revil gave the home crowd a further reason to celebrate with a bronze-medal finish at the 2005 Tornado Worlds in La Rochelle. A member of La Rochelle Sailing Regatta (French: Société des Régates Rochelaises), Espagnon trained most of his competitive sporting career under the tutelage of his personal coach Philippe Neiras.

Espagnon competed for the French sailing squad, as a 32-year-old crew member in the Tornado class, at the 2008 Summer Olympics in Beijing. Building up their Olympic selection, he and skipper Revil finished a credible sixth in the golden fleet phase to lock one of the eleven quota places offered at the 2007 ISAF Worlds in Cascais, Portugal. The French duo started the series with a fantastic top-four mark on the second race; however, a broken halyard lock before race 4 and a wave of unimpressive tenths towards the final stretch bumped Espagnon and Revil out of the medal hunt to eleventh overall by a slight margin, amassing 69 net points.
