= Philip Lawton =

Irish sailor

Personal information
- Nickname: Thaddeus
- Nationality: Ireland
- Born: 7 October 1977 (age 48) Cork, Ireland
- Height: 1.78 m (5 ft 10 in)
- Weight: 68 kg (150 lb)

Sailing career
- Sport: Sailing
- Club: Royal Irish Yacht Club
- Coached by: Ross Killian
- Class: Dinghy

Philip Lawton (born 7 October 1977) is an Irish former sailor, who specialized in the two-person dinghy (470) class. Together with his partner and eventual three-time Olympian Gerald Owens, he was named one of the country's top sailors in the double-handed dinghy for the 2008 Summer Olympics, finishing in a lowly sixteenth place. A member of the Royal Irish Yacht Club, Lawton trained for the Games under his personal coach and Owens' former partner from Athens 2004 Ross Killian.

Lawton competed for the Irish sailing squad, as a 30-year-old crew member in the men's 470 class, at the 2008 Summer Olympics in Beijing. Building up to their Olympic selection, he and skipper Owens finished a satisfying fortieth to secure the last of the twenty quota places offered at the 2007 ISAF Worlds in Cascais, Portugal. The Irish pair surprised the 29-boat fleet by rounding the top mark of the lighter-air second and fifth race, respectively, throughout the ten-leg regatta. A series of substandard outcomes towards the final half, however, left both Lawton and Owens chasing the pack and never recovered, slipping them off the medal round to a lowly sixteenth overall with 129 net points.
