= Patryk Piasecki =

Polish sailor

Personal information
- Nationality: Poland
- Born: 7 August 1986 (age 39) Mrągowo, Warmian-Masurian Voivodeship, Poland
- Height: 1.81 m (5 ft 11 in)
- Weight: 66 kg (146 lb)

Sailing career
- Sport: Sailing
- Club: AZS UWM Olsztyn
- Class: Dinghy

Patryk Piasecki (born 7 August 1986) is a Polish former sailor, who specialized in the two-person dinghy (470) class. Together with his partner and eventual three-time Olympian Kacper Ziemiński, he was named one of the country's top sailors in the double-handed dinghy for the 2008 Summer Olympics, finishing in a lowly eighteenth place. Piasecki also served as a senior member of the sailing roster at the University of Warmia and Mazury's sport academy in Olsztyn (Polish: AZS Uniwersytetu Warmińsko-Mazurskiego w Olsztynie).

Piasecki competed for the Polish sailing squad, as a skipper in the men's 470 class, at the 2008 Summer Olympics in Beijing. Four months earlier, he and crew member Ziemiński topped the selection criteria to lock their own 470 berth for the Games, based on his aggregate scores in a lineup of international regattas sanctioned by the Polish Yachting Association. The Polish pair managed to post a couple of top-ten scores throughout the opening regatta, but a random wave of substandard outcomes under windy conditions, however, denied their chances of entering the medal race, sitting both Piasecki and Ziemiński in nineteenth overall with 151 net points.
