= Edoardo Bianchi (sailor) =

Italian sailor

Personal information
- Full name: Edoardo Bianchi
- Nationality: Italy
- Born: 25 May 1985 (age 41) Varese, Italy
- Height: 1.91 m (6 ft 3 in)
- Weight: 72 kg (159 lb)

Sailing career
- Sport: Sailing
- Club: Yacht Club Italiano
- Coached by: Angelo Glisoni
- Class: Multihull

Edoardo Bianchi (born 25 May 1985) is an Italian former sailor, who specialized in the multihull (Tornado) class. Together with his partner Francesco Marcolini, he was named one of the country's top sailors in the mixed multihull catamaran for two consecutive Olympic editions (2004 and 2008), finishing each in the top ten, respectively. A member of Yacht Club Italiano in his native Genoa, Bianchi trained most of his competitive sailing career under the tutelage of his personal coach and Barcelona 1992 Olympian Angelo Glisoni.

Bianchi made his Olympic debut in Athens 2004, sailing with the 33-year-old skipper Marcolini in the Tornado class. There, the Italian duo rocketed to a solid tenth overall spot against a 17-boat fleet at the end of eleven-race series, accumulating a net grade of 78 points.

At the 2008 Summer Olympics in Beijing, Bianchi competed for the second time with Marcolini in the Tornado class. Building up their Olympic selection, the Italian duo finished a credible eleventh in the golden fleet phase to lock one of the eleven quota places offered at the 2007 ISAF Worlds in Cascais, Portugal. Started the race series in last place, Bianchi and Marcolini stormed their way from behind with a powerful runner-up mark and a couple of fourths recorded to enter the medal round. Tricky wind conditions, however, witnessed the Italians' medal chances fade on the final race, plummeting them further to seventh overall with 74 net points.
