= Fábio Pillar =

Brazilian sailor

Personal information
- Full name: Fábio Silva Pillar
- Nickname: cachopa
- Nationality: Brazil
- Born: 9 April 1986 (age 40) Porto Alegre, Rio Grande do Sul, Brazil
- Height: 1.72 m (5 ft 7 1/2 in)
- Weight: 68 kg (150 lb)

Sport

Sailing career
- Class(es): laser radial and 470
- Club: Clube dos Jangadeiros
- Coach: Paulo Ribeiro

Fábio Silva Pillar (born 9 April 1986 in Porto Alegre), also known as Fábio Dutra Pillar e Silva, is a Brazilian sailor who competes in the two-person dinghy (470) class. He was a member of the Brazilian sailing team at the 2008 Summer Olympics in Beijing, finishing seventeenth along with his partner Samuel Albrecht in the 470 regatta. Throughout his sailing career, Pillar trains full-time at Clube dos Jangadeiros in his native Porto Alegre under the tutelage of head coach Paulo Ribeiro.

Leading up to the Games, he and crew member Samuel Albrecht managed to finish the series in a steady twenty-ninth and assure one of the eight available Olympic berths for their fleet at the 470 World Championships in Melbourne, Australia. In this eleven-race series, the Brazilian duo sailed to a top ten finish at the very start, but a haphazard maneuver on the succeeding leg and a pre-start side penalty on the midway saw them move down the leaderboard to seventeenth out of twenty-nine, recording a net grade of 139 points. Fabio finished 11th in the laser radial world championship in Fortaleza (2005) and after a year of intense training Fabio won the laser radial world championship in Los Angeles (2006)
