= Diana Krutskikh =

Russian sailor

Personal information
- Nationality: Russian
- Born: 20 September 1977 (age 47); Anapa, Russia

Sport
- Sport: Sailing

Diana Krutskikh (born 20 September 1977) is a Russian sailor. She competed at the 2004 Summer Olympics and the 2008 Summer Olympics.
