= Anders Nyholm =

Danish sailor

Personal information
- Full name: Anders Nyholm-Pedersen
- Nationality: Denmark
- Born: 30 March 1982 (age 44) Roskilde, Denmark
- Height: 1.84 m (6 ft 1/2 in)
- Weight: 80 kg (176 lb)

Sailing career
- Sport: Sailing
- Club: Vallensbæk Sejlklub
- Class: Dinghy

Anders Nyholm-Pedersen (born 30 March 1982) is a Danish former sailor, who specialized in the Laser class. He bagged won a silver medal in the Laser Radial class at the 2000 ISAF Youth World Championships in Çeşme, Turkey and later represented his native country Denmark in two editions of the Olympic Games (2004 and 2008).

Nyholm made his Olympic debut, as a 22-year-old, in Athens 2004, sailing in the Laser class. There, he accumulated a net grade of 203 points to end the eleven-race series with a twenty-second overall, a placement higher than Chile's Matías del Solar with respect to the opening leg.

At the 2008 Summer Olympics in Beijing, Nyholm qualified for his second Danish team in the Laser class. Building up his Olympic selection, he finished twenty-third out of 51 sailors advancing to the golden fleet to secure one of the twenty-nine quota places offered at the 2007 ISAF Worlds in Cascais, Portugal. Nyholm could not improve his feat from the previous Games with mediocre marks recorded after ten races, placing in the twenty-third spot with 164 net points.
