= Toh Liying =

Singaporean sailor

Personal information
- Nickname: Toh
- Nationality: Singapore
- Born: 2 April 1985 (age 41) Singapore
- Height: 1.57 m (5 ft 2 in)
- Weight: 52 kg (115 lb)

Sailing career
- Sport: Sailing
- Club: National Optimist Sailing Scheme
- Coached by: Craig Ferris (AUS)
- Class: Dinghy
Medal record
Women's sailing
Representing Singapore
Asian Games
Silver medal – second place	2006 Doha	470
Bronze medal – third place	2002 Busan	420

Toh Liying (born 2 April 1985), also known as Toh Liying, is a Singaporean former sailor, who specialized in the two-person dinghy (470) class. Together with her 17-year-old partner Deborah Ong, she was named one of the country's top sailors in the double-handed dinghy for the 2008 Summer Olympics, finishing in a distant nineteenth place. Outside her Olympic career, Toh and her previous tandem Elizabeth Ong gave the Singaporeans a sterling silver medal in the women's 470 at the 2006 Asian Games in Doha, Qatar. While pursuing to complete her degree in biomedical sciences at Monash University in Melbourne, Australia, Toh trained for the Games under the tutelage of her personal coach Craig Ferris.

Toh competed for the Singaporean sailing squad, as a skipper in the women's 470 class, at the 2008 Summer Olympics in Beijing. Building up to their Olympic selection, she and crew member Ong received a spare berth forfeited by New Zealand, as the next highest-ranked tandem vying for qualification, at the class-associated Worlds nearly eight months earlier in Melbourne. The inexperienced Singaporean duo clearly struggled to catch a vast fleet of world-class sailors under breezy conditions.
