= Evangelos Cheimonas =

Greek sailor

Evangelos "Vangelis" Cheimonas (Greek: Βαγγέλης Χειμώνας; born 12 April 1980) is a Greek sailing athlete and coach. He has competed in various sailing classes and has represented Greece in multiple Olympic Games. As a coach, he has led his teams to numerous victories in international championships.

== Athletic career ==
Cheimonas began his sailing career in 1992, starting in the Optimist class. He then transitioned to competing in the "420" and "470" class double-handed boats. Since 1996, he has participated as a professional athlete in the "Laser" Olympic sailing class, earning a place in the National Olympic Sailing Team of Greece in 2004. Over the years, he has represented his country in three Olympic Games, namely Athens 2004, Beijing 2008, and London 2012.

In the 2002 ISAF World Championship, Cheimonas won the bronze medal. He also earned a bronze medal in the 2009 Mediterranean Games. Additionally, Cheimonas has actively participated in significant big boat world sailing events, including the TP52 class, as well as Match Racing, where he has garnered multiple national titles.

== Coaching career ==
Since 2009, Cheimonas has been working as a professional coach at the Nautical Club of Vouliagmeni in Athens, Greece. This club is renowned as the largest and most prestigious sailing club in the country. During his tenure, Cheimonas has led his teams to capture two World Championships, three European Championships, a gold medal in the Mediterranean Games, and a total of 18 medals in various European and World Championships.

Cheimonas is also a professional skipper certified by the Royal Yachting Association (RYA) and holds the Yachtmaster offshore certificate.
