= Krystal Weir =

Australian sailor

Personal information
- Nationality: Australian
- Born: 15 January 1985 (age 41) Melbourne, Victoria
- Height: 168 cm (5 ft 6 in) (2012)
- Weight: 65 kg (143 lb) (2012)
- Website: www.krystalweir.com

Sailing career
- Country: Australia
- Sport: Sailing
- Event: Laser Radial
- Club: Sandringham Yacht Club
- Coached by: Laura Baldwin and Lex Bertrand

Achievements and titles
- Regional finals: Catholic
Medal record
Representing Australia
World Championships
Gold medal – first place	2004 Manly	Laser Radial
Silver medal – second place	2003 Lake Garda	Laser Radial

Krystal Weir (born 15 January 1985) is an Australian sailor. She finished tenth at the 2008 Summer Olympics. She was selected to represent Australia at the 2012 Summer Olympics in sailing in the Women's Laser Radial class event, where she finished in twelfth.

== Personal ==
Weir was born on 15 January 1985 in Melbourne, Victoria and spent her childhood in Victoria. As of 2012, she lives in Melbourne, Victoria.

Weir is 168 centimetres (5 ft 6 in) tall and weighs 65 kilograms (143 lb).

== Sailing ==
Weir is a sailor and has been described by as "Australia's glamour girl in the world of sailing". She started sailing as an eleven-year-old at the Elwood Sailing Club. She was coached by Lex Bertrand and is now coached by Laura Baldwin who became her coach in 2011. She has a sailing scholarship with the Victorian Institute of Sport, and is a member of the Sandringham Yacht Club. Part of her past training included being thrown overboard by her then coach into Port Phillip Bay. It also included trying to collect tennis balls, ping pong balls and straws that were thrown into the water by her coach while not tipping her boat over. She arrived in London a month before the start of the Games in order to better prepare.

Weir won a World Championship in 2004 in the Laser Radial class. She competed at the 2008 Summer Olympics in the three-crew Yngling team, where she finished tenth alongside teammates Karyn Gojnich and Angela Farrell. She originally was not named to the team, only making the event after another sailor injured herself in a mountain biking accident.

At the 2011 ISAF Sailing World Cup in Melbourne, Weir finished third. In 2012, she spent three months competing in Europe. At the 2012 ISAF Sailing World Cup in the Netherlands, she came in first in round five in the Laser Radial class. At a 2012 ISAF Sailing World Cup event, she came in second. At the 2012 Skandia Sail for Gold Regatta, she finished eighth in the Women's Laser Radial class.

Weir was selected to represent Australia at the 2012 Summer Olympics in sailing in the Women's Laser Radial class event.
