= Livia Väresmaa =

Finnish sailor

Personal information
- Nationality: Finnish
- Born: 14 July 1975 (age 49); Helsinki, Finland

Sport
- Sport: Sailing

Livia Väresmaa (born 14 July 1975) is a Finnish sailor. She competed in the Yngling event at the 2008 Summer Olympics.
