= Francesca Scognamillo =

Italian sailor

Personal information
- Nationality: Italian
- Born: 17 March 1982 (age 43); Livorno, Italy

Sport
- Sport: Sailing

Francesca Scognamillo (born 17 March 1982) is an Italian sailor. She competed in the Yngling event at the 2008 Summer Olympics.
