= Andriy Shafranyuk =

Ukrainian sailor (born 1984)

Personal information
- Full name: Andriy Olehovych Shafranyuk
- Nationality: Ukraine
- Born: 9 February 1984 (age 42) Mykolaïv, Ukrainian SSR, Soviet Union
- Height: 1.78 m (5 ft 10 in)
- Weight: 84 kg (185 lb)

Sailing career
- Sport: Sailing
- Club: Ukraïna Mykolaïv
- Class: Multihull

Andriy Olehovych Shafranyuk (Ukrainian: Андрій Олегович Шафранюк, also transliterated Shafraniuk, born 9 February 1984) is a Ukrainian former sailor, who specialized in the multihull (Tornado) class. Together with his partner Pavlo Kalynchev, he was named one of the country's top sailors in the mixed multihull catamaran for the 2008 Summer Olympics, finishing in a distant thirteenth position. Throughout his competitive sporting career, Shafranyuk trained as a member of the sailing squad for Ukraïna Mykolaïv.

Shafranyuk competed for the Ukrainian sailing squad, as a crew member in the Tornado class, at the 2008 Summer Olympics in Beijing. Leading up to their maiden Games, he and skipper Kalynchev formally accepted a berth forfeited by New Zealand, as the next highest-ranked crew vying for qualification, based on the results at the Tornado Worlds five months earlier in Auckland. The Ukrainian duo started the series superbly with a couple of top-six marks in races 1 and 3, before fading steadily towards the sterns of the 15-boat fleet at the final stretch and never looked back, landing Shafranyuk, and Kalynchev to a distant thirteenth overall with 99 net points.
