= Jonas Kældsø Poulsen =

Danish windsurfer

Personal information
- Nickname: Jonas Kældsø
- Nationality: Denmark
- Born: 21 March 1985 (age 41) Svendborg, Denmark
- Height: 1.90 m (6 ft 3 in)
- Weight: 80 kg (176 lb)

Sailing career
- Sport: Sailing
- Club: Svendborg Sunds Sejlklub
- Coached by: Jacob Holst
- Class: Sailboard

Jonas Kældsø Poulsen (born 21 March 1985) is a Danish former windsurfer, who specialized in the RS:X class. He represented his country Denmark at the 2008 Summer Olympics, finishing among the top twenty-five windsurfers in his signature sailboard. Poulsen trained as a member of Svendborg Sunds Sailing Club (Danish: Svendborg Sunds Sejlklub), under the tutelage of head coach Jacob Holst.

Poulsen competed for the Danish sailing squad in the inaugural men's RS:X class at the 2008 Summer Olympics in Beijing. Building up to his Olympic selection, he scored a commendable, twenty-ninth-place finish to claim one of the 26 berths offered at the 2007 ISAF Worlds in Cascais, Portugal. Poulsen stormed out from a poor start to a blistering top-four finish on the midway of the series. However, he struggled in the breezy conditions on the subsequent races that sent him tumbling down the leaderboard to a lowly twenty-fourth overall with 201 net points.
