= Florencia Gutiérrez =

Argentine windsurfer

Personal information
- Nationality: Argentina
- Born: 21 November 1970 (age 55) Buenos Aires, Argentina
- Height: 1.65 m (5 ft 5 in)
- Weight: 60 kg (132 lb)

Sailing career
- Sport: Sailing
- Club: Club Nautico San Isidro
- Class: Sailboard
Medal record
Women's sailing
Representing Argentina
Pan American Games
Bronze medal – third place	2007 Rio de Janeiro	RS:X

Florencia Gutiérrez (born 21 November 1970) is an Argentine former windsurfer, who specialized in the RS:X class. She won a bronze medal at the 2007 Pan American Games in Rio de Janeiro and eventually represented her nation Argentina at the 2008 Summer Olympics, finishing in the top twenty-five of her signature sailboard. While sailing competitively for the national team, Gutiérrez was a member of San Isidro Nautical Club in the outskirts of her hometown Buenos Aires.

Gutiérrez competed for the Argentine sailing squad, as a 37-year-old, in the inaugural women's RS:X class at the 2008 Summer Olympics in Beijing. Building up to her Olympic selection, she finished twentieth out of 38 entrants in the silver fleet to lock one of the seven places available at the class-associated Worlds nearly eight months earlier in Auckland, New Zealand. Gutiérrez clearly struggled to catch a large fleet of windsurfers from behind under breezy conditions with marks lower than eighteenth place at the end of ten-race series, sitting her steadily in the twenty-fifth spot with 216 net points.
