= Kim Rew =

South African sailor

Personal information
- Nationality: South African
- Born: 26 June 1975 (age 50) Pietermaritzburg, South Africa

Sport
- Sport: Sailing

Kim Rew (born 26 June 1975) is a South African sailor. She competed in the Yngling event at the 2008 Summer Olympics.
