= Bettina Honoré =

Danish windsurfer (born 1971)

Personal information
- Nationality: Denmark
- Born: 7 April 1971 (age 55) Copenhagen, Denmark
- Height: 1.72 m (5 ft 7 1/2 in)
- Weight: 60 kg (132 lb)

Sailing career
- Sport: Sailing
- Club: Hellerup Sejlklub
- Coached by: Jacob Holst
- Class: Sailboard

Bettina Honoré (born 7 April 1971) is a Danish former windsurfer, who specialized in the RS:X class. She was the country's top female windsurfer for the 2008 Summer Olympics, finishing in nineteenth place. A member of the sailing club in Hellerup, Honore trained for the national windsurfing squad under head coach Jacob Holst.

Honoré competed for the Danish sailing squad, as a 37-year-old, in the inaugural women's RS:X class at the 2008 Summer Olympics in Beijing. She finished forty-seventh in the gold fleet to secure the last of the eighteen spots offered at the 2007 ISAF Worlds in Cascais, Portugal. Struggling to chase a large fleet of windsurfers throughout the series, Honoré steered her way from behind to finish strongly in sixth place on the final leg. Based on her cumulative scores, Honoré's best result, however, was not enough to let her enter the medal race, sitting her further in nineteenth overall with 142 net points.
