= Penny Alison =

South African sailor (born 1983)

Personal information
- Nationality: South African
- Born: 10 August 1983 (age 41); Durban, South Africa

Sport
- Sport: Sailing

Penny Alison (born 10 August 1983) is a South African sailor. She competed in the Yngling event at the 2008 Summer Olympics.
