= Lenka Mrzílková =

Czech sailor

Personal information
- Nationality: Czech
- Born: 17 January 1988 (age 38) Brandýs nad Labem-Stará Boleslav, Czechoslovakia
- Height: 170 cm (5 ft 7 in)
- Weight: 58 kg (128 lb)

Sailing career
- Sport: Sailing
- Club: YC Neratovice
- Coached by: Antonín Mrzílek
- Class: Dinghy

Lenka Mrzílková (born 17 January 1988) is a Czech former sailor, who specialized in two-person dinghy (470) class. Together with her partner and Athens 2004 silver medalist in the Europe class Lenka Šmídová, she was named one of the country's top sailors in the double-handed dinghy for the 2008 Summer Olympics, finishing in seventh place. A member of the yacht club in Neratovice, Mrzílková trained most of her competitive career under the tutelage of her personal coach and father Antonín Mrzílek.

Mrzílková competed for the Czech sailing squad, as a crew member in the women's 470 class, at the 2008 Summer Olympics in Beijing. Building up to their Olympic selection, she and skipper Šmídová finished twenty-second to lock the last of five berths available at the class-associated Worlds nearly eight months earlier in Melbourne, Australia. The Czech duo mounted a marvelous lead on the final leg of the series to confirm their spot in the double-point medal race, before they slipped out of contention to seventh overall with 83 net points.
