= Giulia Pignolo =

Italian sailor

Personal information
- Born: 26 July 1980 (age 44); Trieste, Italy

Sport
- Sport: Sailing

Giulia Pignolo (born 26 July 1980) is an Italian sailor. She competed in the Yngling event at the 2008 Summer Olympics.
