= Martin Trčka =

Czech sailor

Martin Trčka (born 22 May 1977) is a Czech Olympic sailor. He competed in the 2004 Olympics in Athens and placed 25th and the 2008 Olympics in Beijing where he placed 31st. His club name is YC Banik Most. He continued to sail in various sailing competitions, including the Laser World Championship in 2009 and 2010. He studied civil engineering at the Czech Technical University.
