= Oskar Johansson =

Canadian sailor (born 1977)

Personal information
- Nationality: Canada
- Born: 23 June 1977 (age 49)

Sailing career
- Sport: Sailing
- College team: Queen's University at Kingston
Medal record
Sailing
Representing Canada
Pan American Games
Gold medal – first place	1999 Winnipeg	Sunfish class

Oskar Johansson (born 23 June 1977) is a Canadian world class sailor from Toronto.

He won the ICSA Men's Singlehanded National Championship in 2000 and competed in Sailing at the 2004 Summer Olympics in Athens, Greece and finished in 15th place. At the 2008 Summer Olympics, he finished 4th in the Tornado class with partner Kevin Stittle.

== Career highlights ==
Results:

- Silver Medal – Tornado class – World Championships – 2008
- Gold Medal – Sunfish Class – Pan Am Games – 1999
- 4th place – Tornado class – Olympic Games – 2008
- Gold Medal – Tornado class – French World Cup (Hyères) – 2007
- 15th Place – Tornado class – Olympic Games – 2004
- Silver Medal – Sunfish Class – World Championships – 2000
- Gold Medal – Laser class – ISCA North American Singlehanded Championships – 1999–2000 season
- 7x Canadian Tornado Champion – 2002–08
- 2x North American Tornado Champion – 2006–07
- Canada's Cup 2011

Awards:

- Canadian Rolex Sailor of the Year - 2012
- Sport Alliance of Ontario – Team of the Year Finalist – 2008
- Canadian Yachting Association – Male Athlete of the Year – 2008
- 2 x Ontario Sailor of the Year – 2000, 2008
- ICSA All American Honorable Mention – 2001
