= Deborah Ong =

Singaporean sailor (born 1990)

Personal information
- Full name: Ong Hui Min
- Nationality: Singapore
- Born: 18 September 1990 (age 35) Singapore
- Height: 1.76 m (5 ft 9 1/2 in)
- Weight: 66 kg (146 lb)

Sailing career
- Sport: Sailing
- Club: National Optimist Sailing Scheme
- Coached by: Craig Ferris (AUS)
- Class: Dinghy

Deborah Ong (born 18 September 1990), also known as Ong Hui Min, is a Singaporean former sailor, who specialized in the two-person dinghy (470) class. Together with her partner and 2006 Asian Games silver medalist Toh Liying, she was named one of the country's top sailors in the double-handed dinghy for the 2008 Summer Olympics, finishing in a distant nineteenth place. A member of the Singapore Sailing Federation, Ong trained for the Games under the tutelage of her Australian-born personal coach Craig Ferris.

Ong competed for the Singaporean sailing squad, as a 17-year-old crew member in the women's 470 class, at the 2008 Summer Olympics in Beijing. Building up to their Olympic selection, she and skipper Toh received a spare berth forfeited by New Zealand, as the next highest-ranked tandem vying for qualification, at the class-associated Worlds nearly eight months earlier in Melbourne. The inexperienced Singaporean duo clearly struggled to catch a vast fleet of world-class sailors under breezy conditions with marks equivalent to the fifteenth position or lower throughout the series, lying them in last overall out of 19 registered crews with 156 net points.
