= Jhonny Bilbao =

Venezuelan sailor (born 1974)

Personal information
- Full name: Jhonny Senen Bilbao Bande
- Nationality: Venezuela
- Born: 9 October 1974 (age 51) Barcelona, Venezuela
- Height: 1.88 m (6 ft 2 in)
- Weight: 95 kg (209 lb)

Sport

Sailing career
- Class: Dinghy
- Club: Centro de Vela Ligera
- Coach: José Bilbao

Jhonny Senen Bilbao Bande (born 9 October 1974) is a Venezuelan former sailor, who specialized in the Finn class. He represented his nation Venezuela at the 2008 Summer Olympics, finishing last out of 26 registered sailors. A member of Centro de Vela Ligera in his native Anzoategui province, Bilbao trained for the country's sailing federation under the tutelage of his personal coach and father José.

Bilbao competed for the Venezuelan sailing squad, as a 33-year-old, in the Finn class at the 2008 Summer Olympics in Beijing. Building up to his Olympic selection, he formally accepted a berth forfeited by Germany, as the next highest-ranked sailor vying for qualification, at the Finn Gold Cup in Melbourne, Australia. Bilbao accumulated a net grade of 149 to round out the 26-man fleet in the last spot at the end of eight races.
