= Ben Remocker =

Canadian sailor

Personal information
- Nationality: Canadian
- Born: 29 November 1978 (age 47) Vancouver, British Columbia, Canada

Sport
- Sport: Sailing

Ben Remocker (born 29 November 1978) is a Canadian sailor. He competed in the 49er event at the 2008 Summer Olympics.
