= Antón Paz =

Spanish sailor

Medal record

Sailing

Representing Spain

Olympic Games
Gold medal – first place	2008 Beijing	Tornado class

Antón Paz Blanco (born 8 August 1976) is a Spanish sailor. With his partner Fernando Echavarri he won a gold medal at the 2008 Summer Olympics in Beijing. The two also competed at the 2004 Olympics in Athens, where they finished eighth. He is from the town of Vilagarcia de Arousa, Galicia, Spain.

He sailed the 2008–09 Volvo Ocean Race as the media crew member on board Telefónica Black.
