= Akira Ishibashi =

Japanese sailor

Personal information
- Nationality: Japanese
- Born: 17 October 1973 (age 51); Fukuoka, Japan
- Height: 171 cm (5 ft 7 in)
- Weight: 70 kg (154 lb)

Sailing career
- Class(es): 470, 49er

Akira Ishibashi (石橋 顕, Ishibashi Akira, born 17 October 1973) is a Japanese sailor. He competed in the 49er event at the 2008 Summer Olympics and finished in 12th position.
