= Luigi Viale =

Italian yacht racer

Luigi Viale (born 5 November 1978) is an Italian former yacht racer who competed in the 2008 Summer Olympics.
