= Tobias Etter =

Swiss sailor (born 1980)

Personal information
- Full name: Tobias Etter
- Nickname: Toby
- Nationality: Switzerland
- Born: 27 October 1980 (age 45) Egg, Zürich, Switzerland
- Height: 1.70 m (5 ft 7 in)
- Weight: 62 kg (137 lb)

Sailing career
- Sport: Sailing
- Club: SC Schloss Greifensee
- Class: Dinghy
Medal record
Men's sailing
Representing Switzerland
Summer Universiade
Bronze medal – third place	2005 İzmir	470

Tobias Etter (born 27 October 1980) is a Swiss former sailor, who specialized in the two-person dinghy (470) class. Together with his partner Felix Steiger, he was named one of the country's top sailors in the double-handed dinghy for the 2008 Summer Olympics, finishing in a distant twenty-third place. Outside his Olympic career, he and Steiger locked the podium spot with a bronze in the men's 470 at the 2005 Summer Universiade in İzmir, Turkey. Etter trained most of his sporting career at Schloss Greifensee Sailing Club in the outskirts of Zürich.

Etter competed for the Swiss sailing squad, as a skipper in the men's 470 class, at the 2008 Summer Olympics in Beijing. He and crew member Steiger topped the Swiss Sailing Federation's selection criteria for a coveted spot on the Olympic team, based on their cumulative scores attained in a series of international regattas, including their top 40 finish at the Worlds nearly eight months earlier in Melbourne, Australia. The Swiss duo successfully posted a triad of single-digit marks each in races 3, 5, and 9, but a random wave of substandard outcomes throughout the series pushed both Etter and Steiger to the middle of a 29-boat fleet, sitting them in twenty-third overall with 162 net points.
