= Ute Höpfner =

German sailor

Personal information
- Nationality: German
- Born: 16 November 1979 (age 45); Berlin, Germany

Sport
- Sport: Sailing

Ute Höpfner (born 16 November 1979) is a German sailor. She competed in the Yngling event at the 2008 Summer Olympics.
