= Efi Mantzaraki =

Greek sailor

Personal information
- Full name: Eftychia Mantzaraki
- Nickname: Efi
- Nationality: Greece
- Born: 12 November 1978 (age 47) Athens, Greece
- Height: 1.71 m (5 ft 7 1/2 in)
- Weight: 70 kg (154 lb)

Sailing career
- Sport: Sailing
- Club: Katoikon Vouliagmeni
- Coached by: Christos Chionas
- Class(es): Dinghy and keelboat

Eftychia "Efi" Mantzaraki (Greek: Ευτυχία Μαντζαράκη; born 12 November 1978) is a Greek former sailor, who specialized in the Yngling and Laser Radial classes. She represented the host nation Greece in the three-woman keelboat at the 2004 Summer Olympics, before switching to a single-handed boat on her second trip to Beijing 2008. Mantzaraki trained full-time under her personal coach Christos Chionas, while sailing competitively for Katoikon Vouliagmeni.

Mantzaraki made her Olympic debut in Athens 2004, when Greece hosted the Games for the second time in history. Teamed up with leader Aikaterini Giakomidou and her fellow crew member Eleni Dimitrakopoulou in the inaugural Yngling class, the Greek trio finished the race series by a massive clamor of the home crowd in eleventh overall with a satisfying net grade of 86.

Mantzaraki switched to a single-handed boat on her second Olympic trip to Beijing 2008, sailing in the Laser Radial class. Building up to her Olympic selection, she finished twenty-fifth out of 51 sailors in the gold fleet to secure one of the remaining places vying for qualification and eventually, to lock the country's Laser Radial berth at the class-associated ISAF Worlds nearly five months earlier in Auckland, New Zealand. Mantzaraki endured most of the races in the middle of the fleet, until she found solace to steer her way of getting a couple of top-ten marks at the very end. Mantzaraki's scores attained in each of the ten legs, however, were not enough to put her through to the medal race, ending her campaign in the eighteenth position with 115 net points.
