= Mateja Petronijević =

Croatian sailor

Personal information
- Nationality: Croatia
- Born: 1 September 1986 (age 40) Pula, SR Croatia, SFR Yugoslavia
- Height: 1.72 m (5 ft 7 1/2 in)
- Weight: 67 kg (148 lb)

Sailing career
- Sport: Sailing
- Club: J.K. Uljanik Plovidba Pula
- Coached by: Moimil Zuban
- Class: Laser Radial

Mateja Petronijević (born 1 September 1986 in Pula) is a Croatian sailor, who specialized in the Laser Radial class. In 2005, she won a silver medal for her class at the European Senior and Junior Cup in Izola, Slovenia, and bronze at the World Laser Sailing Cup in Hyères, France. She is also a member of J.K. Uljanik Plovidba Pula, and is coached and trained by Miomil Zuban.

Petronijevic represented Croatia at the 2008 Summer Olympics in Beijing, where she competed for the Laser Radial class. She finished eleventh overall in this event, with a net score of 98 points at the end of nine races.
