= Igor Lisovenko =

Russian sailor

Igor Lisovenko (born 19 March 1988 in Taganrog) is a Russian sailor. He competed at the 2008 and 2012 Summer Olympics in the Men's Laser class, finishing in 11th and 27th place respectively.
