= Li Xiaoni =

Chinese sailor (born 1986)

Li Xiaoni (born May 10, 1986 in Qingdao) is a female Chinese sports sailor. She competed for Team China at the 2008 Summer Olympics.

== Major performances ==
- 2003 National Youth Championships – 4th 470 class;
- 2005 National Youth Championships – 2nd 470 class;
- 2006 Qingdao International Regatta – 3rd Yngling class
