= Wen Yimei =

Chinese sailor (born 1982)

Yu Chunyan
Personal information
- National team: China
- Born: November 21, 1982 (age 43) Hangzhou, Zhejiang, China
- Height: 170 cm (5 ft 7 in)
- Weight: 55 kg (121 lb)

Sailing career
- Sport: Sailing
Medal record
Women's sailing
Representing China
Asian Games
Bronze medal – third place	2006 Doha	470

Wen Yimei (Chinese: 闻一梅 born November 21, 1982 in Hangzhou, Zhejiang) is a female Chinese sports sailor who will compete for Team China at the 2008 Summer Olympics.

== Major performances ==
- 2006 Asian Championships – 1st 470 class;
- 2006 National Championships Qingdao – 1st 470 class/470 class long distance race;
- 2006 National Championships Grand Finals – 1st 470 class;
- 2006 Asian Games – 3rd 470 class
