= Yu Chunyan =

Chinese sailor (born 1985)

Personal information
- National team: China
- Born: April 18, 1985 (age 41) Jiaxing, Zhejiang, China
- Height: 176 cm (5 ft 9 in)
- Weight: 67 kg (148 lb)

Sailing career
- Sport: Sailing
Medal record
Women's sailing
Representing China
Asian Games
Bronze medal – third place	2006 Doha	470

Yu Chunyan (Chinese: 于春燕, born April 18, 1985 in Jiaxing, Zhejiang) is a Chinese sports sailor who competed for China at the 2008 Summer Olympics. Her height is 176 cm and her weight is 67 kg.

== Major performances ==
- 2006 Asian Championships – 1st 470 class;
- 2006 National Championships Qingdao – 1st 470 class/470 class long distance race;
- 2006 National Championships Grand Finals Rizhao – 1st 470 class
