= Sedef Köktentürk =

Turkish windsurfer

Personal information
- Nationality: Turkey
- Born: 22 July 1974 (age 51) İzmir, Turkey
- Height: 1.68 m (5 ft 6 in)
- Weight: 53 kg (117 lb)

Sailing career
- Sport: Sailing
- Club: New York Yacht Club (USA)
- Class: Sailboard

Sedef Köktentürk (born 22 July 1974) is a Turkish former windsurfer, who specialized in the RS:X class. She was the country's top female windsurfer for the 2008 Summer Olympics, finishing last of the 27-woman fleet. Outside competitive sailing, Köktentürk worked in the investment management division at Goldman Sachs for seven years, before taking a directorial role at Generation Investment Management in London.

Köktentürk competed for the Turkish sailing squad, as a lone female, in the inaugural women's RS:X class at the 2008 Summer Olympics in Beijing. Building up to her Olympic selection, she formally accepted a berth forfeited by Germany, as the next highest-ranked windsurfer vying for qualification, at the class-associated Worlds nearly eight months earlier in Auckland, New Zealand. Köktentürk clearly struggled to catch a large fleet of windsurfers from behind under breezy conditions with marks lower than the top 20 and an unanticipated eighth-leg exit at the end of the ten-race series, leaving her in last place with 232 net points.
