= Stéphane Locas =

Canadian sailor

Personal information
- Full name: Stéphane Locas
- Nickname: Napoleon
- Nationality: Canada
- Born: 10 January 1981 (age 45) Saint-Eustache, Quebec, Canada
- Height: 1.70 m (5 ft 7 in)
- Weight: 62 kg (137 lb)

Sailing career
- Sport: Sailing
- Club: Beaconsfield Yacht Club
- Coached by: Marc-André Littée
- Class: Dinghy

Stéphane Locas (born 10 January 1981) is a Canadian former sailor, who specialized in the two-person dinghy (470) class. Together with his partner Oliver Bone, he was named one of the country's top sailors in the double-handed dinghy for the 2008 Summer Olympics, finishing in a distant twenty-ninth place. A member of Beaconsfield Yacht Club in Montreal, Locas trained throughout his sailing career for the Canadian team under head coach Marc-André Littée.

Locas competed for the Canadian sailing squad, as a skipper in the men's 470 class, at the 2008 Summer Olympics in Beijing. Building up to their Olympic selection, he and crew member Bone finished within the top thirty to secure one of the twenty quota places offered at the 2007 ISAF Worlds in Cascais, Portugal. The Canadian duo clearly struggled to catch a vast fleet of 28 other sailing crews from behind under breezy conditions, with marks lower than the top fifteen and a premature start penalty on the seventh leg after ten races, sitting them in last overall with 205 net points.
