= Pim Nieuwenhuis =

Dutch sailor (born 1976)

Personal information
- Full name: Pim Nieuwenhuis
- Nationality: Dutch
- Born: 23 December 1976 (age 49) Enkhuizen
- Height: 1.78 m (5.8 ft)

Sailing career
- Sport: Sailing
- Club: Watersport Vereniging ‘Almere’
- Class: Tornado
- Updated on 12 February 2014

Pim Nieuwenhuis (born 23 December 1976, in Enkhuizen) is a sailor from the Netherlands. Nieuwenhuis as crew on the Dutch Tornado with Mitch Booth as helmsman took 5th place in the Tornado during the 2008 Olympics, in Qingdao.

== Sailing career ==
Nieuwenhuis started in the optimist dinghy where he picked up the first racing skills. Soon he moved on to Olympic classes and started in the Tornado class in 1994. He was recruited by coach Roy Heiner as a talent for his big boat campaigns. After 5 years of big boat sailing Pim moved back again to sail Olympic classes, this time in the 49er, missing out on the 2004 Summer Olympics in Athens. Nieuwenhuis started a new Olympic campaign with Mitch Booth in the tornado in 2006.
