= Pavlo Kalynchev =

Ukrainian sailor (born 1981)

Personal information
- Full name: Pavlo Pavlovych Kalynchev
- Nationality: Ukraine
- Born: 6 June 1981 (age 45) Mykolaïv, Ukrainian SSR, Soviet Union
- Height: 1.83 m (6 ft 0 in)
- Weight: 74 kg (163 lb)

Sailing career
- Sport: Sailing
- Club: Ukraïna Mykolaïv
- Class: Multihull

Pavlo Pavlovych Kalynchev (Ukrainian: Павло Павлович Калінчев; born 6 June 1981) is a Ukrainian former sailor, who specialized in the multihull (Tornado) class. Together with his partner Andriy Shafranyuk, he was named one of the country's top sailors in the mixed multihull catamaran for the 2008 Summer Olympics, finishing in a distant thirteenth position. Throughout his competitive sporting career, Kalynchev trained as a member of the sailing squad for Ukraïna Mykolaïv.

Kalynchev competed for the Ukrainian sailing squad, as a skipper in the Tornado class, at the 2008 Summer Olympics in Beijing. Leading up to their maiden Games, he and crew member Shafranyuk formally accepted a berth forfeited by New Zealand, as the next highest-ranked crew vying for qualification, based on the results at the Tornado Worlds five months earlier in Auckland. The Ukrainian duo started the series superbly with a couple of top-six marks in races 1 and 3, before fading steadily towards the sterns of the 15-boat fleet at the final stretch and never looked back, landing Kalynchev and Shafranyuk to a distant thirteenth overall with 99 net points.
