= Maria Klemetz =

Finnish sailor

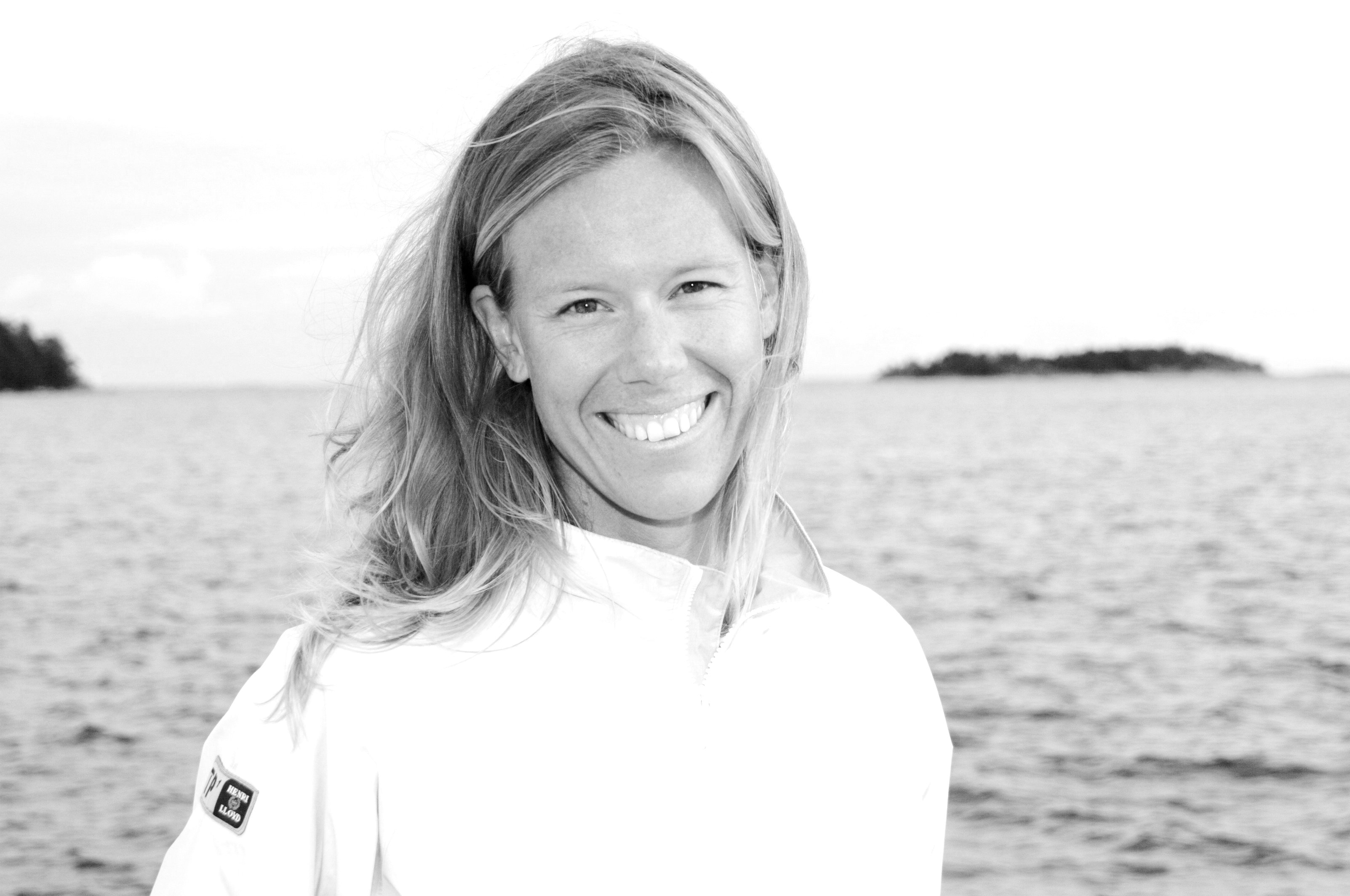
- Klemetz in 2006

Personal information
- Nationality: Finnish
- Born: 28 December 1976 (age 49) Kuusankoski, Finland

Sport
- Sport: Sailing

Maria Klemetz (born 28 December 1976) is a Finnish sailor. She competed in the Yngling event at the 2008 Summer Olympics.
