= Ertuğrul İçingir =

Turkish windsurfer

Personal information
- Nationality: Turkey
- Born: 22 November 1975 (age 50) Adana, Turkey
- Height: 1.80 m (5 ft 11 in)
- Weight: 72 kg (159 lb)

Sailing career
- Sport: Sailing
- Club: Fenerbahçe Yelken Kulübü
- Classes: Mistral, RS:X

Ertuğrul İçingir (born 22 November 1975 in Adana) is a Turkish windsurfer. He has competed in three time Olympic Games, firstly in the Mistral One Design Class, and then at the 2008 Summer Olympics RS:X (sailboard) event.

== Results ==
Year	Competition	Venue	Position	Event
2000	Olympic Games	(Australia) Sydney	31st	2000 Olympics – Mistral One Design
2004	Olympic Games	(Greece) Athens	11th	2004 Olympics – Mistral One Design
2008	Olympic Games	(China) Beijing	22nd	2008 Olympics – RS:X
