= Fabian Heidegger =

Italian windsurfer

Personal information
- Nickname: Fabi
- Nationality: Italy
- Born: 4 August 1988 (age 37) Bolzano, Italy
- Height: 1.75 m (5 ft 9 in)
- Weight: 65 kg (143 lb)

Sailing career
- Sport: Sailing
- Club: A.V.L. Caldaro
- Coached by: Paolo Ghione
- Class: Sailboard

Fabian Heidegger (born 4 August 1988) is an Italian former windsurfer, who specialized in the RS:X class. He represented his country Italy at the 2008 Summer Olympics, finishing among the top twenty windsurfers in his signature sailboard. Heidegger trained most of his competitive sporting career, as a member of the sailing roster for A.V.L. Caldaro, under the tutelage of his personal coach Paolo Ghione.

Heidegger competed for the Italian sailing squad, as a 20-year-old, in the inaugural men's RS:X class at the 2008 Summer Olympics in Beijing. Building up to his Olympic selection, he scored a commendable, eleventh-place finish at the 2007 ISAF Worlds in Cascais, Portugal to lock the country's top RS:X spot for the Games. Heidegger started the series comfortably with a superb top-eight mark on the third leg, before fading steadily towards the middle of the 35-man fleet and never looked back, sitting him in the top twenty overall position with 138 net points.

Heidegger sought to bid for his second consecutive trip to the Games in London 2012, but he lost the domestic selection to Federico Esposito, abruptly prompting him to retire from the sport.
