= Athina Frai =

Greek windsurfer

Personal information
- Full name: Antonia-Athina Frai
- Nickname: Tony Frey
- Nationality: Greek
- Born: 17 January 1976 (age 50) Hamburg, Germany
- Height: 1.71 m (5 ft 7 1/2 in)
- Weight: 61 kg (134 lb)

Sailing career
- Sport: Sailing
- Club: Tzitzifies Kallithea Yacht Club
- Coached by: Panagiotis Bizios
- Class: Sailboard

Antonia-Athina Frai (Greek: Αντωνία-Αθήνα Φράι; born 17 January 1976) is a Greek former windsurfer, who specialized in Mistral and Neil Pryde RS:X classes. She picked up a bronze medal at the inaugural RS:X Europeans in 2006 and also represented her country Greece in two editions of the Summer Olympic Games (2004 and 2008), finishing in the fifteenth position each, respectively. A member of Tzitzifies Kallithea Yacht Club, Frai trained most of her competitive sporting career under the tutelage of her personal coach Panagiotis Bizios.

Frai made her Olympic debut in Athens 2004, when Greece hosted the Games for the second time in history. There, she accumulated a net grade of 123 points to obtain a fifteenth overall position at the end of the eleven-race series in the women's Mistral One Design class.

At the 2008 Summer Olympics in Beijing, Frai qualified for her second Greek team, as a 32-year-old, in the inaugural women's RS:X class. Building up to her Olympic selection, she finished twenty-first in the gold fleet to secure one of the eighteen places offered at the 2007 ISAF Worlds in Cascais, Portugal. Chasing against a vast fleet of windsurfers to the front, Frai steered her best way under breezy conditions to get a couple of top ten marks through the midway of the series. Frai's scores attained in each of the ten legs, however, narrowly missed her opportunity to enter the medal race by a slight edge, sitting her in the same spot as the previous Games with 107 net points.
