= Natalia Ivanova (sailor) =

Russian sailor

Personal information
- Full name: Nataliya Vladimirovna Ivanova
- Nationality: Russia
- Born: 11 June 1984 (age 42) Sochi, Russian SFSR, Soviet Union
- Height: 1.68 m (5 ft 6 in)
- Weight: 62 kg (137 lb)

Sailing career
- Sport: Sailing
- Club: EShVSM
- Coached by: Oleg Spolan
- Class(es): Dinghy and Keelboat

Nataliya Vladimirovna Ivanova (Russian: Наталья Владимировна Іванова; born 11 June 1984) is a Russian former sailor, who specialized in both Europe and Yngling classes. A multiple-time national champion in her respective boats, Ivanova represented her nation Russia in two editions of the Olympic Games (2004 and 2008) and also trained as a member of the sailing roster at SK EShVSM Moscow.

Ivanova made her Olympic debut, as a single-handed dinghy sailor, in Athens 2004, finishing last of the twenty-five entrants in the Europe class with 204 net points.

At the 2008 Summer Olympics in Beijing, Ivanova teamed up with helmswoman Ekaterina Skudina and fellow crew member Diana Krutskikh to sail in the Yngling class. Vaulting quickly to the top spot of the world rankings, the Russian trio put up a gallant effort to take the fifth overall position and to secure their selection as the nation's top-ranked crew in their respective boat at the class-associated ISAF World Championships five months earlier in Cascais, Portugal. At the Games, the Russian trio scored a powerful race victory over the rest of the fleet on the sixth leg of the series that saw them advance further to the medal round and ended their Olympic campaign consummately in sixth overall with a satisfying net grade of 56, eight points away from the medal position.
