= Luo Youjia =

Chinese sailor

Luo Youjia (Chinese: 罗友佳; pinyin: Luó Yǒujiā; born 1977-09-13 in Dongfang, Hainan) is a male Chinese sports sailor who competed for Team China at the 2008 Summer Olympics. He competed with Chen Xiuke.

Luo Youjia's English name is Jacky.

== Major performances ==
- 1997/2005 National Games – 8th/7th 470 class
