= Kemal Muslubaş =

Turkish yacht racer (born 1977)

Personal information
- Full name: Kemal Muslubaş
- Nationality: Turkey
- Born: 30 December 1977 (age 48) Istanbul, Turkey
- Height: 1.75 m (5 ft 9 in)
- Weight: 78 kg (172 lb)

Sport

Sailing career
- Class: Dinghy
- Club: İstanbul Yelken Kulübüne
- Coach: Akif Muslubaş
Medal record
Men's sailing
Representing Turkey
Summer Universiade
Silver medal – second place	2005 Istanbul	Laser

Kemal Muslubaş (born 30 December 1977 in Istanbul) is a retired Turkish sailor, who specialized in the Laser class. Muslubas represented his nation Turkey in two editions of the Olympic Games (2004 and 2008), became a two-time national champion in the Laser class at the Turkish Championships, and also earned a silver medal at the 2005 Summer Universiade in his native Istanbul.

Muslubas started his sporting career with his brother Akif Muslubas as members of the sailing team for Fenerbahçe Sport Club in 1988, and then transferred to Istanbul Yachting Club (Turkish: İstanbul Yelken Kulübüne) twelve years later.

Muslubas made his Olympic debut at the 2004 Summer Olympics in Athens, where he placed thirty-third in the Laser regatta with a net grade of 256, despite a yachting malfunction in the last race that saw him tumble down the leaderboard.

When his native Istanbul hosted the 2005 Summer Universiade, Muslubas boasted his first international success with a silver medal in the Laser class. On that same year, he recorded his first ever triumph in an ISAF Graded event and then repeated it in 2006.

At the 2008 Summer Olympics in Beijing, Muslubas qualified for his second Turkish squad in the Laser class, by having secured a berth and placing thirteenth from the 2007 ISAF World Championships in Cascais, Portugal. He boosted his confidence from a poor Olympic feat in Athens to achieve an eighteenth-place finish with 146 net points in a fleet of forty-three sailors, but failed to advance further into the medal race.
