= Naoko Kamata =

Japanese sailor (born 1983)

Personal information
- Full name: Naoko Kamata
- Nickname: Nao-Pee
- Nationality: Japan
- Born: 7 June 1983 (age 43) Zushi, Kanagawa, Japan
- Height: 1.69 m (5 ft 6 1/2 in)
- Weight: 67 kg (148 lb)

Sailing career
- Sport: Sailing
- Club: Team ABeam
- Coached by: Kazunori Komatsu
- Classes: Dinghy and keelboat
Medal record
Women's sailing
Representing Japan
Asian Games
| Gold medal – first place | 2006 Doha | 470 |
World Championships
| Silver medal – second place | 2006 Rizhao | 470 |

Naoko Kamata (鎌田 奈緒子, Kamata Naoko; born 7 June 1983) is a Japanese former sailor, who specialized in the two-person dinghy (470) class. Together with her partner Ai Kondo, she was named one of the country's top sailors in the double-handed dinghy for the 2008 Summer Olympics, finishing in a lowly fourteenth place. Outside her Olympic career, Kamata collected a total of two medals (a gold and a silver) in a major international regatta, spanning the World Championships and the Asian Games. A member of Team ABeam's sailing roster, Kamata trained most of her sporting career under the tutelage of her personal coach Kazunori Komatsu.

Kamata made her international debut with Kondo at the 2006 ISAF RS:X Worlds in Rizhao, China, picking up a runner-up spot on the women's side after their close duel with the Dutch crew of Marcelien de Koning and Lobke Berkhout for the gold. Later in that year, the Japanese duo capped a successful campaign with their country's only sailing gold in the women's 470 at the Asian Games in Doha, Qatar.

At the 2008 Summer Olympics in Beijing, Kamata qualified for the Japanese sailing squad, as a crew member in the women's 470 class. Despite missing out the podium by the narrowest of margins, she and skipper Kondo managed to secure one of the twelve places offered at the 2007 ISAF Worlds in Cascais, Portugal. Entered the Qingdao regatta as the newly-crowned world ranking leaders, the Japanese duo had a terrible performance in the initial half of the series with marks lower than the top ten. They staged a magnificent comeback in the second half by winning races 6 and 9, but another technical error on the last leg saw both Kamata and Kondo tumble down the leaderboard to a lowly fourteenth overall with 93 net points.
