= Samuel Albrecht =

Brazilian sailor (born 1981)

Personal information
- Full name: Samuel Reis Albrecht
- Nickname: Samuca
- Born: 2 September 1981 (age 45) São Leopoldo, Rio Grande do Sul, Brazil
- Height: 1.80 m (5 ft 11 in)
- Weight: 73 kg (161 lb)

Sailing career
- Sport: Sailing
- Club: Veleiros do Sul
- Coached by: Paulo Roberto Ribeiro
- Class: Dinghy Nacra 17
Medal record
Sailing
Representing Brazil
Pan American Games
Bronze medal – third place	2019 Lima	Nacra 17
Bronze medal – third place	2023 Santiago	Nacra 17

Samuel Reis Albrecht (born 2 September 1981) is a Brazilian sailor who specializes in both two-person dinghy (470) and mixed multihull (Nacra 17) classes. He has been selected to compete for the Brazilian sailing team at the 2008 Summer Olympics, finishing seventeenth along with his partner Fabio Pillar in the 470 regatta. After missing out on the Olympic selection in 2012, Albrecht decided to turn his attention and eventually teamed up with Olympic bronze medalist Isabel Swan on the newly instated Nacra 17 catamaran for a chance to compete at his possible second Games in Rio de Janeiro. As of April 2015, Albrecht is ranked forty-fourth in the world for the mixed multihull class by the International Sailing Federation.

Albrecht competed as a crew member for the Brazilian squad in the men's 470 class at the 2008 Summer Olympics in Beijing. Leading up to his Games, Albrecht and skipper Fabio Pillar managed to finish the series in a steady twenty-ninth and assure one of the eight available Olympic berths for their fleet at the 470 World Championships in Melbourne, Australia. Throughout the eleven-race series, the Brazilian duo sailed away to a marvelous top ten finish at the very start of the regatta, but a haphazard maneuver on the succeeding leg and a pre-start side penalty on the midway saw them tumble down the leaderboard to seventeenth overall from a fleet of twenty-nine boats, recording a net grade of 139 points.

Having missed the selection for his 2012 Olympic bid in the 470, Albrecht had shifted his immediate focus to the newly instated Nacra 17 catamaran. In 2015, Albrecht and his partner Isabel Swan had put together a solid feat with two best races at the Brazil Cup to secure the place on the host nation's sailing squad for their second Olympic Games in Rio de Janeiro. Albrecht would return in the Nacra 17 at the 2020 Summer Olympics.
