= Tim Goodbody =

Irish sailor

Personal information
- Born: 1983 (age 41–42); Dublin, Ireland

Sport
- Sport: Sailing

Tim Goodbody (born 1983) is an Irish sailor. He competed at the 2008 Summer Olympics in Beijing, where he placed 21st in the Finn class.
