= Jonas von Geijer =

Swedish sailor

Jonas von Geijer (born Jonas Lindberg April 17, 1981) is a Swedish sailor. He competed in the 49er class in the 2008 Summer Olympics and in the 2012 Summer Olympics.
