= Kevin Stittle =

Canadian sailor

Kevin Stittle (born July 18, 1979 in Brampton, Ontario) is a Canadian sailor from Orangeville, Ontario. Stittle began sailing at the age of 11. At the 2008 World Championships, he won a silver medal in the tornado class.

At the 2008 Summer Olympics he finished in fourth place in the tornado class with partner Oskar Johansson. As of 2020, Kevin Stittle is the manager of the AIM Vasser Sulivan race team.
