= Ger Owens =

Irish sailor

Gerald Owens (Ger) born 13 July 1979 in Dublin is an Irish sailor. He competed at the 2004, 2008 and 2012 Summer Olympics in the 470 class.
