= Xavier Revil =

French sailor

Personal information
- Full name: Xavier Revil
- Nationality: France
- Born: 28 May 1971 (age 55) Saint-Martin-d'Hères, France
- Height: 1.76 m (5 ft 9 1/2 in)
- Weight: 68 kg (150 lb)

Sailing career
- Sport: Sailing
- Club: Société des Régates à Voile d'Annecy
- Coached by: Philippe Neiras
- Class: Multihull
Medal record
Men's sailing
Representing France
World Championships
Bronze medal – third place	2005 La Rochelle	Tornado

Xavier Revil (born 28 May 1971) is a French sailor who specialized in the multihull (Tornado) class. Together with his partner Christophe Espagnon, he was named one of the country's top sailors in the mixed multihull catamaran for the 2008 Summer Olympics, finishing in eleventh position. Outside his Olympic career, he and Espagnon achieved a bronze-medal finish at the 2005 Tornado Worlds in La Rochelle. A member of the local sailing regatta club in his current hometown Annecy (French: Société des Régates à Voile d'Annecy), Revil trained for most of his competitive sailing career under the tutelage of his personal coach Philippe Neiras.

Revil competed for the French sailing squad as a 37-year-old skipper in the Tornado class at the 2008 Summer Olympics in Beijing. In the Olympic selection process, he and crew member Espagnon finished sixth in the golden fleet phase to secure one of the eleven quota places offered at the 2007 ISAF Worlds in Cascais, Portugal. The French duo started the series with a top-four mark on the second race; however, a broken halyard lock before race 4 and several tenth-place finishes towards the final stretch placed Revil and Espagnon out of the medal contention, finishing eleventh overall with 69 net points.
