= Song Xiaqun =

Chinese sports sailor

Song Xiaoqun (born August 22, 1977 in Shengzhou, Zhejiang) is a female Chinese sports sailor who competed for Team China at the 2008 Summer Olympics.

== Major performances ==
- 1999/2000/2002/2003/2004/2005 National Championships – 1st 470 class;
- 2008 Rolex Miami OCR – 8th Yngling class;
- 2008 Palma Princess Sofia Regatta – 4th Yngling class
