= Will Howden =

British sailor (born 1977)

Will George Howden
Personal information
- Full name: William George Howden
- Nationality: British
- Born: 14 February 1977 (age 49) Enfield, London, England
- Height: 183 cm (6 ft 0 in)

Sailing career
- Sport: Sailing
- Class(es): Tornado, Formula 18
Medal record
Sailing
Representing Great Britain
World Championships
Silver medal – second place	2005 La Rochelle	Tornado
Silver medal – second place	2010 Brittany	Formula 18

William George Howden (born 14 February 1977 in Enfield, London) is a British sailor who competed in the 2008 Summer Olympics and has also participated in the Extreme Sailing Series.
