= Cathrine Gjerpen =

Norwegian sailor

Personal information
- Nationality: Norwegian
- Born: 18 September 1987 (age 37); Oslo, Norway

Sport
- Sport: Sailing
- Club: Royal Norwegian Yacht Club

Cathrine Margrethe Gjerpen (born 18 September 1987) is a Norwegian sailor. She was born in Oslo, and represents the Royal Norwegian Yacht Club. She competed at the 2008 Summer Olympics in Beijing, where she placed 28th in the Laser Radial class.
