= Chen Xiuke =

Chinese sailor

Chen Xiuke (Chinese: 陈秀科; pinyin: Chén Xiùkē; born 31 December 1976 in Dongfang, Hainan) is a male Chinese sports sailor. He competed for Team China at the 2008 Summer Olympics with Luo Youjia. He finished in 14th place.

In 2007, Chen was injured while training in the United States when a boat capsized.

His original English name, Buddy Chen, was changed to Sugar Chen by his American coach's mother-in-law due to the similarity between this and the pronunciation of his Chinese name.

After competing in the Olympics, Chen became a competitive sailing coach.

== Major performances ==
- 2003 National Champions Tournament – 4th 470 class;
- 2004 Asian Championships – 8th 470 class;
- 2005 National Games – 7th 470 class
