= Johannes Polgar =

German sailor

Personal information
- Full name: Johannes Sebastian Polgar
- Nickname: Jojo
- Nationality: Germany
- Born: 25 August 1977 (age 48) Olpe, North Rhine-Westphalia, West Germany
- Height: 1.83 m (6 ft 0 in)
- Weight: 74 kg (163 lb)

Sailing career
- Sport: Sailing
- Club: Norddeutscher Regatta Verein
- Coached by: Rigo de Nijs (NOR)
- Class(es): Multihull, keelboat
Medal record
Men's sailing
Representing Germany
European Championships
Gold medal – first place	2010 Viareggio	Star

Johannes Sebastian Polgar (born 25 August 1977) is a German sailor who specialized in the multihull (Tornado) and keelboat (Star) classes. Together with his partner Florian Spalteholz, he was named one of the country's top sailors in the mixed multihull catamaran for the 2008 Summer Olympics, finishing in eighth place. After the Games, Polgar decided to move into the Star class and eventually shared a gold-medal victory with his partner Markus Koy at the 2010 Europeans in Viareggio, Italy. A member of North German Regatta Club (German: Norddeutscher Regatta Verein), Polgar trained for most of his competitive sailing career under the tutelage of his Norwegian-born personal coach Rigo de Nijs.

Polgar competed for the German sailing squad as a 30-year-old skipper in the Tornado class at the 2008 Summer Olympics in Beijing. Leading up to their maiden Games, he and crew member Spalteholz topped the selection criteria in a duel against brothers Tino and Niko Mittelmeier for the country's Tornado berth, based on their cumulative scores attained at two international regattas stipulated by the German Sailing Federation (German: Deutscher Segler Verband). The German duo started off the race series in the middle of the fleet until shifty wind conditions propelled them to the front in the final half with a single victory and a triad of top-five marks, making both Polgar and Spalteholz eligible for the medal race. An unforeseen capsize by the German duo on the initial run, however, caused their medal chances to vanish, dropping them to eighth overall with 74 net points.
