= Susana Romero (sailor) =

Spanish sailor

Personal information
- Full name: Susana Romero Steensma
- Nationality: Spain
- Born: 5 September 1990 (age 35) Las Palmas, Gran Canaria, Spain
- Height: 1.73 m (5 ft 8 in)
- Weight: 64 kg (141 lb)

Sailing career
- Sport: Sailing
- Club: Real Club Nautico de Gran Canaria
- Coached by: Manuel Pazos; Santi López-Vázquez
- Class: Dinghy
Medal record
Women's sailing
Representing Spain
Mediterranean Games
Bronze medal – third place	2009 Pescara	Laser Radial

Susana Romero Steensma (Note: In this Spanish name, the first or paternal surname is Romero and the second or maternal family name is Steensma.) (born 5 September 1990) is a Spanish former sailor, who specialized in the Laser Radial class. She represented her country Spain at the 2008 Summer Olympics and eventually earned a bronze medal at the 2009 Mediterranean Games in Pescara, Italy. Romero trained under the tutelage of her personal coach Santi López-Vázquez, while sailing competitively for Gran Canaria Royal Nautical Club (Spanish: Real Club Nautico de Gran Canaria).

Romero competed for the Spanish sailing squad, as a 17-year-old, in the inaugural Laser Radial class at the 2008 Summer Olympics in Beijing. She topped the national rankings by a 19-point edge ahead of Alicia Cebrián to lock the country's Laser Radial spot for the Games, based on her performance in three selection meets approved by the Royal Spanish Sailing Federation. Romero started comfortably with a stellar top-ten feat on the second mark, but she steadily faded her pace towards the middle of the fleet for the remainder of the series, sitting her in the twenty-first spot with a net grade of 127.
