= Francesco Marcolini =

Italian sailor

Personal information
- Nationality: Italy
- Born: 1 June 1971 (age 55) Genoa, Italy
- Height: 1.74 m (5 ft 8 1/2 in)
- Weight: 71 kg (157 lb)

Sailing career
- Sport: Sailing
- Club: Yacht Club Italiano
- Coached by: Angelo Glisoni
- Class: Multihull

Francesco Marcolini (born 1 June 1971) is an Italian former sailor who specialized in the multihull (Tornado) class. Together with his partner Edoardo Bianchi, he was named one of the country's top sailors in the mixed multihull catamaran for two consecutive Olympic editions (2004 and 2008), finishing in the top ten in each. A member of Yacht Club Italiano in his native Genoa, Marcolini trained for most of his competitive sailing career under the tutelage of his personal coach and Barcelona 1992 Olympian Angelo Glisoni.

Marcolini made his Olympic debut in Athens 2004, sailing with the 19-year-old crew member Bianchi in the Tornado class. There, the Italian duo finished tenth overall in a 17-boat fleet at the end of the eleven-race series, accumulating 78 net points.

At the 2008 Summer Olympics in Beijing, Marcolini competed for the second time with Bianchi in the Tornado class. In the Olympic selection process, the Italian duo finished eleventh in the golden fleet phase to secure one of the eleven quota places offered at the 2007 ISAF Worlds in Cascais, Portugal. The Italian duo started the race series in last place, but later improved their position with a second-place finish and two fourth-place results to qualify for the medal race. However, wind conditions in the final race affected their medal chances, and they finished seventh overall with 74 net points.
