= Kacper Ziemiński =

Polish sailor

Kacper Ziemiński (born 4 November 1990 in Więcbork) is a Polish sailor. He competed at the 2012 Summer Olympics in the men's Laser class.
