= Consuelo Monsegur =

Argentine sailor

Consuelo Monsegur (June 23, 1970) is an Argentine sports sailor. At the 2008 Summer Olympics she competed in the Women's 470 class with Maria Fernanda Sesto. They finished in 16th place. At the 2012 Summer Olympics she competed in the same event with the same teammate. They finished in 13th place.
