= Karyn Gojnich =

Australian sailor

Karyn Gojnich (born 27 December 1960, née Davis) is an Australian sailor. She has competed for Australia at three Olympic Games, in 1988 in the Women's Two Person Dinghy (470), and in 2004 and 2008 in the three-person Yngling class.

Gojnich is a board member of Yachting Australia and in 2015 she was elected as a vice-president of the Oceania Sailing Federation (OSAF).
