= Fernanda Oliveira (sailor) =

Brazilian sailor

Medal record

Women's sailing

Representing Brazil

Olympic Games
Bronze medal – third place	2008 Beijing	Women's 470 class

Fernanda Ryff Moreira de Oliveira Horn (born 19 December 1980 in Porto Alegre) is a Brazilian sailor. She won a bronze medal in 470 class at the 2008 Summer Olympics. She has competed in 6 Olympic games which has only been matched by two other female sailors.

Pos.	Games	Event	Crew	Ref.
19	2000 Olympics, Sydney	Female 470	Maria Krahe	
17	2004 Olympics, Athens	Female 470	Adriana Kostiw	
3	2008 Olympics, Qingdoa	Female 470	Isabel Swan	
6	2012 Olympics, Weymouth	Female 470	Ana Barbachan	
8	2016 Olympics, Rio de Janeiro	Female 470	Ana Barbachan	
9	2020 Olympics, Enoshima	Female 470	Ana Barbachan	
