= Moores (disambiguation) =

Moores is a Canadian chain of clothing stores.

Moores may also refer to:

== Places ==
- Moores, former name of Riverton, California
- Moores Flat, California, a former settlement
- Moores Hill, Indiana
- Moores Branch, a stream in Kansas and Missouri

== People with the surname Moores ==
- Aaron Moores (born 1994), British swimmer
- Alec Moores (1919–2014), Canadian politician
- Audrey Moores, French-Canadian chemist
- Billy Moores (born 1948), Canadian ice hockey executive
- Charles B. Moores (1849–1930), American businessman and Oregon politician
- Clara Moores (1896–1986), American stage actress
- Dick Moores (1909–1986), American comic strip creator whose best known work was for the comic strip Gasoline Alley
- Eldridge Moores (1938–2018), American geologist
- Frank Moores (1933–2005), Canadian politician and businessman
- Gary Moores (born 1959), British wrestler
- Ian Moores (1954–1998), English footballer
- Indira Moores, Canadian wrestler
- Isaac R. Moores (1796–1861), American soldier and politician in Illinois and Oregon
- Isaac R. Moores Jr. (1831–1884), American businessman and Oregon politician
- James Moores, American politician
- Jeff Moores (c. 1906–1989), Australian rugby player
- John Moores (baseball) (born 1944), American businessman
- John Moores (British businessman) (1896–1993), British businessman, football club owner, politician and philanthropist
- John Moores Jr. (1928–2012), British businessman
- John H. Moores (1821–1880), American businessman and Oregon politician
- Mark Moores (born 1970), American businessman and politician
- Merrill Moores (1856–1929), Indiana lawyer and politician
- Peter Moores (businessman) (1932–2016), British businessman, art collector and philanthropist
- Peter Moores (cricketer) (born 1962), English cricketer and coach
- Simon Moores, British businessman
- Ted Moores (born 1943), Canadian boat builder
- Tom Moores (born 1996), English cricketer
- Tom Moores (politician) (1903–1983), Australian politician
- Yvonne Moores (born 1941), British nurse

== Other uses ==
- Moores Stores, former British grocery store chain

== See also ==
- Moore (disambiguation)
