= Worcester =

Worcester may refer to:

== Places ==
=== United Kingdom ===
- Worcester, England, a city and the county town of Worcestershire in England
  - Worcester (UK Parliament constituency), an area represented by a Member of Parliament
- Worcester Park, London, England
- Worcestershire, a county in England

=== United States ===
- Worcester, Massachusetts, the largest city with the name in the United States
  - Worcester County, Massachusetts
- Worcester, Missouri
- Worcester, New York, a town
  - Worcester (CDP), New York, within the town
- Worcester Township, Pennsylvania
- Worcester, Vermont
  - Worcester (CDP), Vermont, within the town
- Worcester, Wisconsin, a town
- Worcester (community), Wisconsin, an unincorporated community
- Worcester County, Maryland
- Barry, Illinois, formerly known as Worcester
- Marquette, Michigan, formerly known as New Worcester

=== Other places ===
- Worcester, Limpopo, South Africa
- Worcester, Western Cape, South Africa
  - Worcester (House of Assembly of South Africa constituency)
- Worcester Summit, Antarctica

== Transportation ==
- Worcester, a GWR 3031 Class locomotive that was built for and run on the Great Western Railway between 1891 and 1915
- Union Station (Worcester, Massachusetts), called "Worcester" by the Massachusetts Bay Transportation Authority
- HMS Worcester, several ships of the British Royal Navy
- USS Worcester, several ships of the United States Navy
- Worcester, a 1785 launched British East Indiaman

== People ==
- John of Worcester, English monk and chronicler
- Roger of Worcester, Bishop of Worcester
- Sylvester of Worcester, Bishop of Worcester
- Worcester (surname)

== Foods ==
- Worcester Pearmain, an English apple cultivar
- Worcestershire sauce, often "Worcester sauce", a spicy condiment devised in Worcester, England, in the 19th c.

== Other uses ==
- Worcester Academy
- Worcester, Bosch Group, a British domestic heating company
- Worcester College (disambiguation)
- Royal Worcester, an English bone china and porcelain manufacturer

== See also ==
- Worcester v. Georgia, an 1832 U.S. Supreme Court Case
- Wooster (disambiguation)
