= Wooster =

Wooster may refer to:

== Places ==
=== India ===
- Wooster Nagar, a small fishing village in the state of Tamil Nadu

=== United States ===
- Wooster, Arkansas, a town in Faulkner County
- Wooster, Georgia, an unincorporated community
- Wooster, Kosciusko County, Indiana, an unincorporated community
- Wooster, Scott County, Indiana, an unincorporated community
- Wooster, Ohio, a city in Wayne County
- Wooster, Baytown, Texas
- Wooster Square, a neighborhood in the city of New Haven, Connecticut
- Wooster Township, Wayne County, Ohio

== Schools in the United States ==
- College of Wooster, in Wooster, Ohio
- Earl Wooster High School, in Reno, Nevada
- Wooster High School (Ohio), in Wooster, Ohio
- Wooster School, in Danbury, Connecticut

== Groups and organizations ==
- Wooster Collective, an online street art website
- The Wooster Group, a New York-based U.S. ensemble of theatre and media artists
- Wooster Warriors, a former U.S. ice hockey team

== Other uses ==
- Wooster Island, an island in the Housatonic River in Orange, Connecticut
- Wooster Lake, a lake in Lake County, Illinois

== People with the surname Wooster ==
- Charles Whiting Wooster, 1780-1848, grandson of David Wooster and Commander-in-Chief of the Chilean Navy
- David Wooster (1710–1777), brigadier-general in the Continental Army during the American Revolution
- Edward Wooster (1622–1689), early pioneer and founder of Derby, Connecticut
- Fred Wooster (1938–1993), cofounder of the Saanich Lacrosse Association, Canadian Lacrosse Hall of Fame
- Louise Wooster (1842–1913), "Lou Wooster", famous madam in Birmingham, Alabama
- Reginald Wooster (1903-1968), English cricketer who made one first-class appearance for Northamptonshire
- Stanton Hall Wooster of Wooster and Davis, a U.S. Navy airman who attempted to fly over the Atlantic Ocean in 1927

== Fictional characters ==
- Bertie Wooster, character in the stories of P. G. Wodehouse, adapted in the Jeeves and Wooster TV show
- Henry Wooster, character in the stories of P. G. Wodehouse, uncle of Bertie Wooster
- Wooster, a giant weasel in The New Adventures of Winnie the Pooh episode, The Great Honey Pot Robbery

== See also ==
- Wooster Street (disambiguation)
- Worcester (disambiguation), pronounced and commonly misspelled Wooster
