= Jean-Jacques Provoyeur =

South African sailor & boatbuilder

J-J Provoyeur
Personal information
- Full name: Jean-Jacques Provoyeur
- Nationality: South African
- Born: 24 December 1950 (age 75) Worcester, South Africa

Sport
- Sport: Sailing

Jean-Jacques Provoyeur, a.k.a. "JJ", (born November 1950) is a South African sailor and yacht constructor. He competed in the BOC Challenge 1994-95 single single-handed round-the-world yacht race, which he completed in 133 days.

== Racing ==
- Fireball (dinghy) championships
- BOC Challenge 1994-95 (now the Velux 5 Oceans Race)
- 1989–1990 Vendée Globe

== Boatbuilding ==
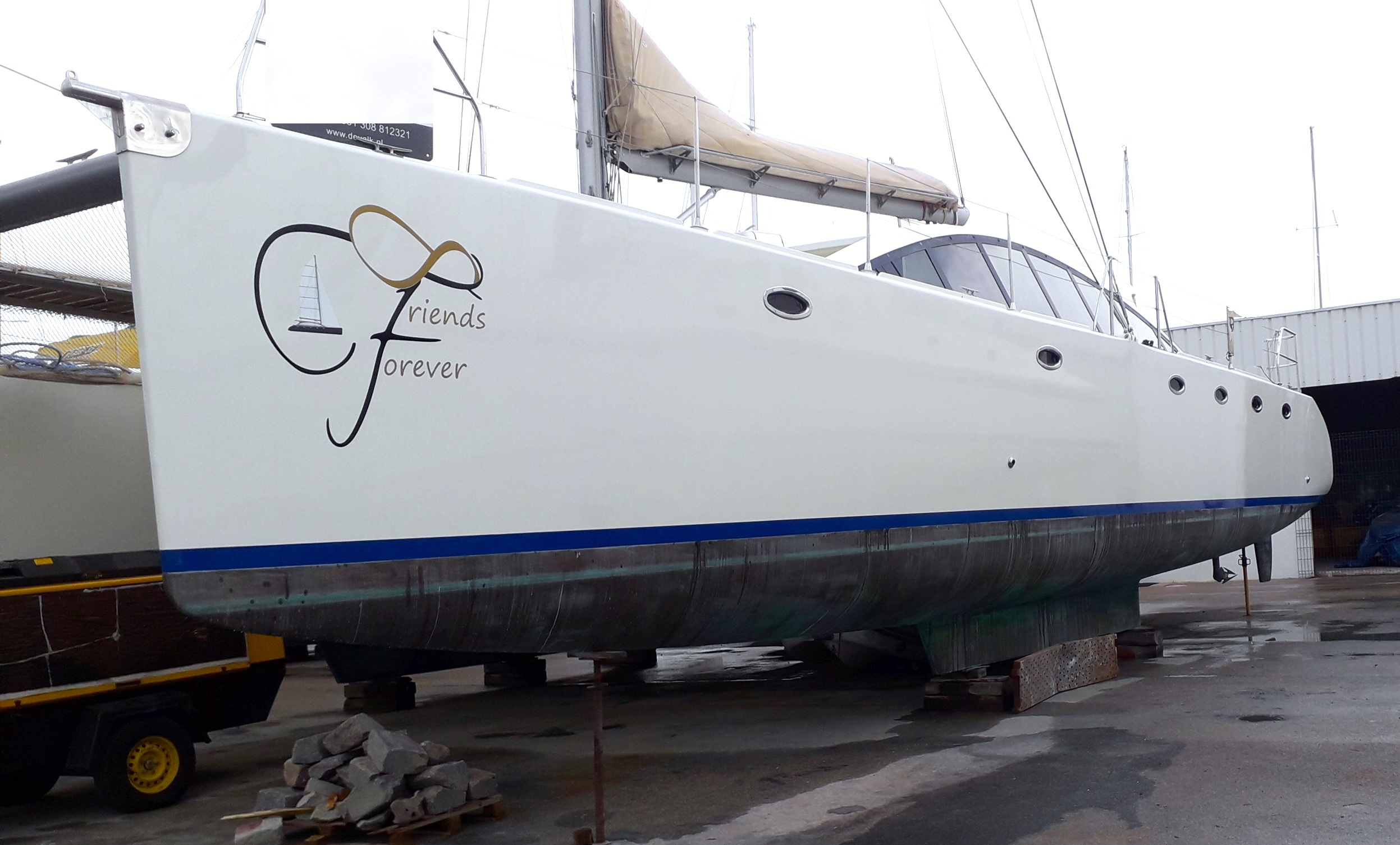
"Friends Forever", a DH550 55' radius chine plywood catamaran built by J-J Provoyeur & others.

Provoyeur has built numerous monohulls and catamarans, principally employing the cold-moulding and Dudley Dix "radius chine plywood" techniques, using plywood and epoxy. Such vessels range from small sailing dinghies to large 60' racing yachts and 55' cruising catamarans such as the Dudley Dix DH550.

== Personal life ==
Provoyeur is based in the Algarve, Portugal, and is married to Esther Provoyeur.

== See also ==
- Dominique Provoyeur
