= Guy Bernardin =

French offshore sailor and navigator (born 1945)

Personal information
- Nationality: French
- Born: 1945 Saint-Briac-sur-Mer
- Died: August 2017 (aged 71–72) U.S. East Coast, North Atlantic

Sailing career
- Sport: Sailing

Guy Bernardin was a French sailor born in 1945 in Saint-Briac-sur-Mer, Ille-et-Vilaine, and disappeared at sea in August 2017, is a French skipper. He had participated in several offshore races, including two BOC Challenges, the 1989–1990 Vendée Globe and the 1990 Route du Rhum. On 2 October 2017 his 15-metre sailboat Crazy Horse, which he had just acquired, was found empty off Cape Cod in the United States. He had left Southport on the East Coast of the United States on 9 August for La Turballe and had not given any sign of life since 15 August.

== Key results ==
- 1980: 44th of the English Transat, on the 38 feet Rasto
- 1981: Twostar, on the 38-foot Rasto
- 1983: 4th in the BOC Challenge (Class 2), on the 38-foot Rasto
- 1984: 2nd in the English Transat (class 2 monohull), on the 44-foot Biscuits LU
- 1985: 2nd of the Twostar, on the IMOCA 60 Biscuits LU 2
- 1987: 4th in the BOC Challenge, on the IMOCA 60 Biscuits LU 2
- 1990: Abandoned in the 1989–1990 Vendée Globe, on the 60 feet O-KAY
- 1990: 16th of the Route du Rhum, on the 60 feet Rancagua
