= Sabbatha Rahzuardi =

Indonesian artist

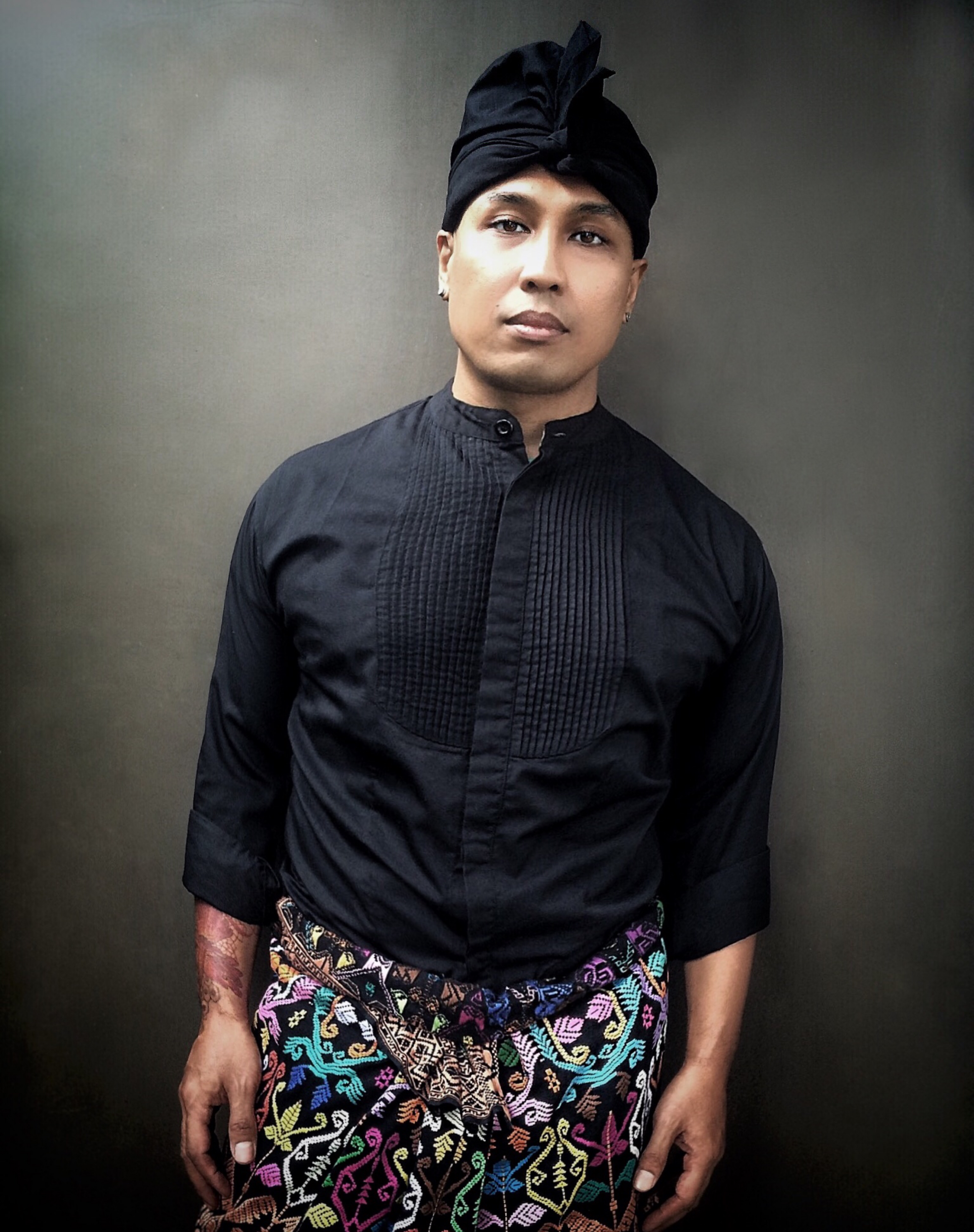
- Born: May 28, 1977 (age 48); Jakarta
- Education: Sorbonne IX University Paris Dauphine, France
- Occupation: 3D Origami Visual Artist
- Title: 3D Origami Visual Artist
- Parent(s): Pramono R Pramoedjo (father), Maria Goretti SR (mother)

Sabbatha Rahzuardi or known as Sabbatha (born in Jakarta, on May 28, 1977). Sabbatha is a former Indonesian fashion accessories designer. Raised in a family of artists, Sabbatha started his career in 2005 as a fashion designer for accessories and handbags namely Sabbatha. Since 2016 until today, Sabbatha is more as an origami visual 3D art and interior design decoration, with Sabbatha Origami.

== History ==
After completing his education at Paris Sorbonne IX Dauphine France, in 2001, Sabbatha decided to stay, settle, and build his career in Bali. In 2014 Sabbatha began to venture into the world of origami visual arts.
