= Benchmark Mineral Intelligence =

Benchmark Mineral Intelligence also known as Benchmark Minerals, is a London-based price reporting agency and specialist information provider for the lithium-ion battery to electric vehicle (EV) supply chain. It was founded by Simon Moores, the agency's majority owner, in 2014. The company had £11 million in assets as of 2022.

== Operations ==
Benchmark Minerals’ price assessment division regularly prices raw materials and components used in batteries such as lithium, cobalt, graphite, rare earth elements, cathodes, and others. The first two of which are used in futures contracts launched in partnership with Intercontinental Exchange.

Its Lithium ion Battery Megafactories Assessment tracks the global build out of cell capacity worldwide including cathode, anode, raw material demand, cell format and end users.

Benchmark Minerals holds events where its own expert analysts present their latest data, analysis and views on the market. The Benchmark World Tour is a series of free-investment seminars for the industry. Originally starting with 8 cities back in 2015, the Benchmark World Tour has grown to 15 cities world-wide including New York, Toronto, Sydney, Melbourne, Hong Kong, Tokyo, Seoul, London, Frankfurt, and Cape Town. Benchmark Minerals’ premier industry event is known as Benchmark Minerals Week that takes place in California each year, it features two main shows, Cathodes Conference and Graphite & Anodes Conference. Benchmark Minerals Summit takes place in Washington DC each year in May. The conference brings together both US-based lithium-ion battery to electric vehicle supply chain and US government departments and policy makers.

== History ==
Benchmark Mineral Intelligence has testified to the US Senate Committee for Energy & Natural Resources on three occasions, in 2017, 2019, and 2020

On August 20th of 2019, Benchmark received IOSCO type 1 certification after an audit by Ernst & Young. In 2021, Benchmark successfully received an IOSCO type 2 accreditation for lithium, cobalt, nickel and graphite prices after an audit by PwC.

On November 15th of 2023, a 20% stake in Benchmark Minerals was acquired by private equity firm Spectrum Equity.

Benchmark received the King's Award for Enterprise in International Trade in May 2024, a UK business honor. In June 2024, Benchmark acquired Rho Motion, a company that tracked EV sales, battery installations, rare earth magnets, recycling, and related areas.

In January 2025, Andy Miller was appointed CEO (previously COO since 2021), with Simon Moores transitioning to Executive Chairman. Caspar Rawles became COO.

Benchmark was reported to have cut a fifth of its workforce in October 2025. The layoffs include at least 40 people, out of a total workforce of 200 as part of a restructuring at the company following a weakening of battery material prices.
