= Oil Price Information Service =

American energy and fuel price data provider

Oil Price Information Service (OPIS)
- Company type: Subsidiary
- Founded: October 1977; 48 years ago
- Founders: Tom Kloza; Ben Brockwell
- Headquarters: Rockville, Maryland, U.S.
- Area served: Worldwide
- Key people: Brian Crotty (CEO)
- Number of employees: 300-350
- Parent: IHS Markit (?-2022); News Corp. (2022-present)
- Website: opisnet.com

Oil Price Information Service (OPIS) is a price reporting agency which provides information that is used for commercial contracts and trade settlement related to petroleum, gasoline, diesel, ethanol, biodiesel, LP-gas, jet fuel, crude, natural gas, petrochemicals, recycled plastics, refinery feedstocks, residual fuel, and kerosene. It is based in Rockville, Maryland and has offices in New Jersey, Houston, Texas, Minnesota, and internationally in Sweden, Romania, Singapore, and Japan.

On August 2, 2021, it was announced that News Corp, the parent company of Dow Jones & Co., would buy OPIS from IHS Markit for US$1.15 billion. When the purchase was finalized on February 28, 2022, the company became a unit of News Corp.

== History ==
According to the International Organization of Securities Commissions, OPIS is one of the four main price reporting agencies for oil market price reporting including daily market price assessments. The other three are Platts, Argus Media and ICIS.

OPIS is regarded as a benchmark in multiple areas such as Propane and NGL (Natural gas liquids). In 2016 it made four new contracts for trading at ICE Futures Europe.

== Acquisitions ==
1996 - OPIS acquired the Stalsby/Wilson Directory business and Computer Petroleum Corp. (CPC).
2005 - OPIS acquired Axxis Software.
2012 - OPIS acquired PointLogic Energy (formerly LCI Energy Insight).
2013 - OPIS acquired GasBuddy.
2015 – OPIS acquires NAVX, the leading European and South American provider of retail fuel pricing, parking and Electric Vehicle (EV) charging location information.
2016 – IHS acquires OPIS for $650 Million.
2018 - OPIS acquires Petrochem Wire.
2022 - News Corp acquires OPIS and merges it with Dow Jones
2024 - OPIS acquires A2i Systems
