= Worcester (surname) =

Worcester is an English surname. Notable people with the surname include:

- Alec Worcester (1887-1952), British stage and silent film actor
- Alfred Worcester (1855-1951), American medical doctor, pioneer in patient care, appendicitis, Caesarean section
- Bevan Worcester (1925-1969), Australian sailor
- Dean Conant Worcester (1866–1924), American zoologist, public official, and businessman
- Donald E. Worcester (1915-2003), historian of the American Southwest
- Henry Aiken Worcester (1802-1841), American Swedenborgian minister and vegetarian
- Jane Worcester (died 1989), American biostatistician and epidemiologist
- Joseph Emerson Worcester (1784–1865), American lexicographer
- Kent Worcester (born 1959), political scientist, historian, critic, and songwriter
- Maud Worcester Makemson (1891-1977), astronomer
- Noah Worcester (1758–1837), American peace activist
- Noah Worcester (1812-1847), American dermatologist
- Robert Worcester (born 1933), founder of Market and Opinion Research International Ltd.
- Samuel Worcester (1798–1859), American missionary to the Cherokees
- Samuel Worcester (theologian) (1770–1821), Unitarian controversialist
- Samuel T. Worcester (1804–1882), American politician
- Samuel Worcester Rowse (1822-1901), illustrator
- Thomas Worcester Hyde (1841-1899), Union brigadier general
- Thomas Worcester, American Jesuit academic
- Tracy Worcester (born 1958), English actress and environmental activist
- Wayne Worcester (born 1947), American journalist, author, and professor
- William Worcester (c. 1415 – c. 1482), English chronicler and antiquary
