= Charles B. Moores =

American businessman and politician

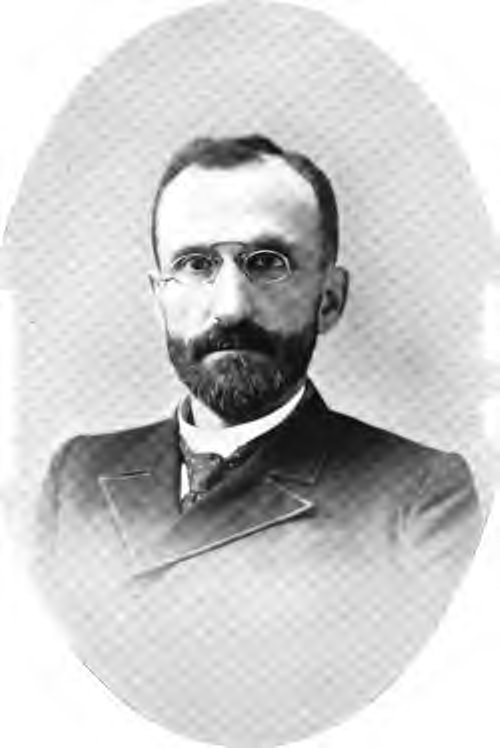

18th Speaker of the Oregon House of Representatives
- In office 1895–1896

Member of the Oregon House of Representatives from the 34th district
- In office 1895–1896

Personal details
- Born: August 6, 1849 Benton, Missouri
- Died: January 5, 1930 (aged 80) Portland, Oregon
- Party: Republican
- Spouse: Sarah E. Chamberlain
- Education: Willamette University University of Pennsylvania Law School University of Michigan

Charles Bruce Moores (August 6, 1849 – January 5, 1930) was an American businessman and politician in the state of Oregon. A native of Missouri, he came from a family of politicians including his father John H. Moores, his grandfather Isaac R. Moores, and uncle Isaac R. Moores, Jr. who all served in the Oregon Legislature. A Republican, he served as the Speaker of the Oregon House of Representatives during his sole term in the House in 1895.

== Early life ==
Charles Moores was born to John H. Moores and Virginia Lafayette Lamon on August 6, 1849, in Benton, Missouri. In 1852, the family moved to the Oregon Territory over the Oregon Trail, arriving in November. This included his grandfather Isaac and uncle Isaac, junior. After living in Portland for a few months, the family relocated south to Salem in March 1853. Moores received his education there where he attended Willamette University, graduating in 1870 with a Bachelor of Arts degree. One of his classmates was Theodore Thurston Geer, later Governor of Oregon.

Moores then worked as draughtsman for the Oregon and California Railroad and in their real estate office, working a total of five years for the railroad in Portland before moving to the East Coast in 1874. In Washington, DC, he enrolled in a business college before relocating again to Pennsylvania where he studied law at the University of Pennsylvania School of Law. Moores then finished his legal studies at the University of Michigan where he graduated from in 1877 with a Bachelor of Laws degree with honors before returning to Salem where he lived for 45 years. In Salem, he passed the bar and briefly practiced law.

He was married to Sarah E. Chamberlain (born October 20, 1853) on November 1, 1881, and they had four children, Merrill, Gordon, Chester, and Gertrude, all born in Salem. In 1880, he was selected to work as the chief clerk at the Oregon House of Representatives. Both Merrill and Gordon would later work as clerks in the House as well. From 1882 to 1887 he worked as the private secretary of Oregon Governor Z. F. Moody.

== Political career ==
In 1894, Moores was elected to the Oregon House to represent Marion County and District 34. Serving as a Republican in the 1895 session, his only session, he was elected as the Speaker of the House by fellow House members. Following this term Moores was appointed as the register of public lands at the United States Land Office in Oregon City in 1897, and served in that position until 1903. He lived in Oregon City for eleven years.

In 1910, Portland Mayor Joseph Simon appointed him to the public docks commission. He was a commissioner for ten years, five as chairman. Moores was also the chairman of the Oregon Republican Party's central committee in 1912 and 1914, and served on the city council in Salem. He ran for the office of Oregon Secretary of State in 1912, but lost to Ben Olcott.

== Later life and family ==
After retiring from public service Moores remained in Portland and became involved in history preservation, as well as a member of the Independent Order of Odd Fellows, being a member of the later for 53 years. He served as a president of the Oregon Pioneer Association in 1915, and was member of the organization for 17 years. Moores was a director at the Oregon Historical Society from 1910 to 1918 and was the vice president of the board from 1918 to 1927. He also was employed with the Capital Lumbering Company in Salem and served on the board of trustees at Willamette University for 53 years beginning in 1878. At Willamette he had previously served as treasurer and secretary, while his father had also been a trustee at the college.

His father John had been in the Oregon State Senate, his grandfather was in the Oregon Territorial Legislature, and his uncle had also been Speaker of the Oregon House of Representatives. Son Gordon C. Moores served in the Washington Legislature and son Chester A. Moores served as chairman of the Portland Housing Authority for which he won the 1946 Portland First Citizen Award. Charles Moores died on January 5, 1930, and the age of 80 in Portland, where he lived the last 24 years of his life.
