= Simon Moores =

British businessman and entrepreneur

Simon David Moores
- Born: November 1983; 42 years ago United Kingdom
- Education: University of Birmingham
- Occupations: Businessman, entrepreneur
- Years active: 2006–present
- Known for: Founder & former CEO (now Executive Chairman) of Benchmark Mineral Intelligence and authority on lithium-ion batteries
- Notable work: Price reporting in critical minerals (lithium, cobalt, graphite, nickel)
- Board member of: UK Government Expert Committee for Critical Minerals (member)
- Website: benchmarkminerals.com

Simon David Moores is a British businessman and entrepreneur, specializing in the lithium ion battery and electric vehicle industry.

He is founder and CEO of Benchmark Mineral Intelligence, an independent market intel and price reporting agency for the lithium-ion battery to EV supply chain.

He established Benchmark Mineral Intelligence index that sets the lithium industry’s benchmark pricing for cobalt, graphite, nickel and battery cells.

== Career ==
Moores began his career in 2006 at Industrial Minerals. He was named Assistant Editor and three years later he became Deputy Editor, where he worked with non-metallic mineral industries. During his time as Deputy Editor, he was responsible for creating the lithium industry’s first ever annual conference, and he also broke the news that China had blocked rare earth exports to Japan in 2010.

In 2014 Moores established Benchmark Mineral Intelligence, a price report agency (PRA) that specialises in setting prices for the lithium-ion battery to electric vehicle supply chain.

He testified to the US Senate three times, in 2017, 2019 and 2020, where he was focused on the impact of critical mineral supply chains in the wake of the rise of energy storage and electric vehicles, and outlined the percentage of global capacity controlled by the US at each stage of the lithium-ion battery supply chain, with the answer for most being zero.

Moores has given guest lectures at Oxford University and Stanford University, and introduced the battery and electric vehicle supply chain subject to the UK public at the Royal Institution of Great Britain.

In 2021, Moores was appointed to the UK Government’s first ever Expert Committee for Critical Minerals.
