= Salem Pioneer Cemetery =

Historic site in Marion County, Oregon, US

- Odd Fellows Rural Cemetery; Salem Pioneer Cemetery
- U.S. National Register of Historic Places
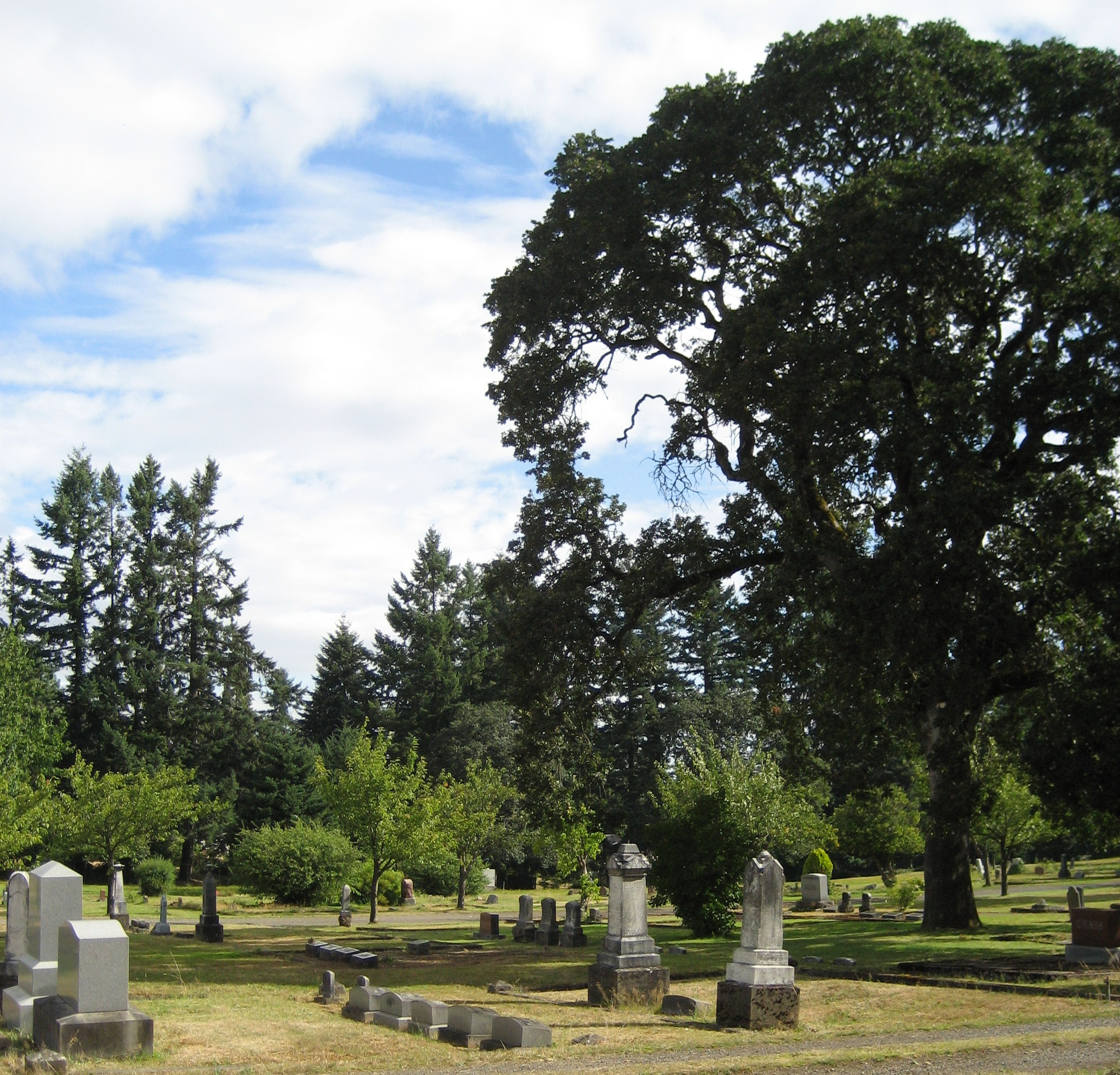
- Location: Salem, Oregon, U.S.
- Coordinates: 44°55′12″N 123°02′52″W
- Area: 16 acres (65,000 m^{2})
- Built: 1853
- Website: salempioneercemetery.org
- Part of: City of Salem
- NRHP reference No.: 13000707
- Added to NRHP: September 11, 2013

Salem Pioneer Cemetery (also known as the I.O.O.F. Cemetery or Oddfellows Cemetery) is a cemetery in Salem, Oregon, United States. It has been listed as a National Register of Historic Places since 2013, under the name Odd Fellows Rural Cemetery.

== Overview ==
Salem Pioneer Cemetery is one of two historic cemeteries located next to each other at the intersection of South Commercial and Hoyt streets. It is just east of City View Cemetery. The earliest burials center around the Methodist missionary pioneer David Leslie. The Methodist Mission was founded by the Reverend Jason Lee in 1834. This was the first mission to the Native Americans in the Pacific Northwest. After the end of the mission period, settlers poured into the Willamette Valley to take advantage of the land that was being granted due to the passage of the Donation Land Claim Act of 1850, brought to Congress by early pioneer Samuel R. Thurston, Oregon's first delegate.

David Leslie became Jason Lee's principal assistant. He was a leader in the movement to organize the provisional government of Oregon, and a lifelong trustee of the Methodists' Oregon Institute, which was charted as Willamette University by the Territorial legislature in 1854.

In 1985, the City of Salem's Parks Division agreed to be titleholder and steward of the cemetery, mainly due to work done by the Friends of the Pioneer Cemetery. The Friends of the Pioneer Cemetery consists of a group of concerned citizens working together to raise awareness of the rich local history and to raise funds to supplement the limited public monies available to maintain this historic site.

== Notable burials ==
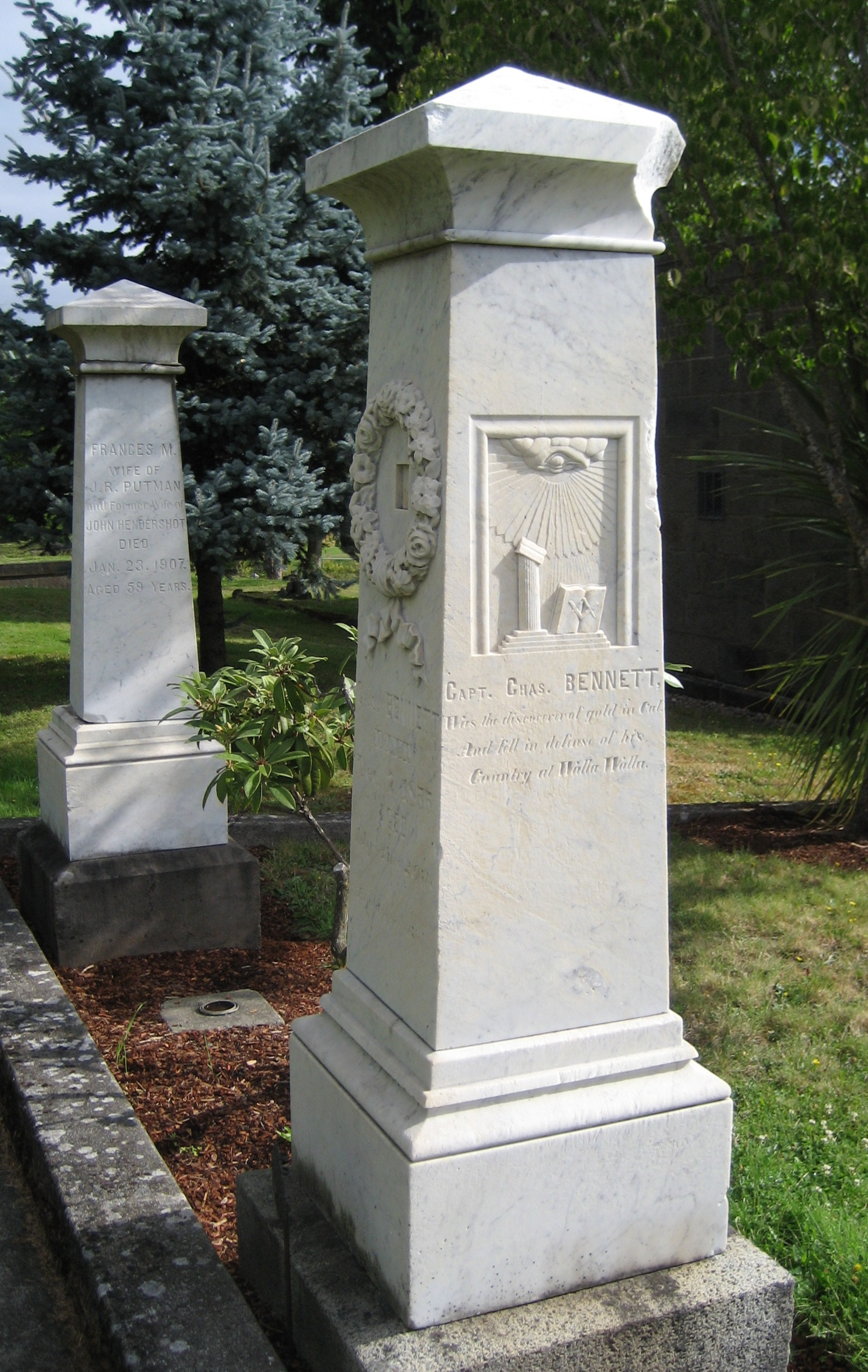
Gravemarker of Charles H. Bennett

- Captain Charles H. Bennett (1811–1855) plot #106
- Tabitha Moffatt Brown (1780–1858) plot #44
- Asahel Bush (1824–1913) plot #66
- Stephen Fowler Chadwick (1825–1895) 5th Governor of Oregon
- Governor John Pollard Gaines (1795–1857) plot #56
- Alonzo Gesner (1842–1912) plot #549
- Hancock Lee Jackson (1796–1876), 13th Governor of the State of Missouri
- Augustus C. Kinney (1845–1908) plot #603
- Robert Crouch Kinney (1813–1875) plot #588
- David Leslie (1797–1869) plot #135
- John McCourt (1874–1924) plot #200
- Isaac R. Moores (1796–1861) plot #9
- Isaac R. Moores, Jr. (1831–1884) plot #18
- John H. Moores (1821–1880) plot #19
- Lieutenant Frederick Schwatka (1849–1892), plot #113
- George K. Shiel (1825–1893) plot #136
- Samuel R. Thurston (1815–1851) plot #076
- Dr. William Holden Willson (1805–1856)
