= Alonzo Gesner =

American politician

Oregon State Senator
- In office 1895–1898
- Preceded by: G. E. Hayes
- Succeeded by: L. L. Porter
- Constituency: Clackamas County; Marion County

Personal details
- Born: March 2, 1842 Coles County, Illinois
- Died: March 6, 1912 (aged 70) Salem, Oregon
- Resting place: Salem Pioneer Cemetery; 44.920150°N 123.047933°W
- Party: Republican
- Spouse: Rhoda E. Neal
- Education: Willamette University

Alonzo Gesner (March 2, 1842 – March 6, 1912) was an American land surveyor, Indian agent, and politician in the state of Oregon. A native of Illinois, he immigrated as a boy to the Oregon Country with his family where he became a deputy surveyor for the United States government. A Republican, he also was appointed as an Indian agent to the Warm Springs Reservation and later was a member of the Oregon State Senate.

== Early life ==
Alonzo Gesner was born in Coles County, Illinois, to Reuben A. Gesner and his wife Mary V. Bailey on March 2, 1842. His father was a native New Yorker who moved to Illinois in 1834 where he married Bailey of Kentucky. The family took the Oregon Trail in 1845 to the unorganized Oregon Country and settled in the Willamette Valley. Gesner's parents took up a land claim in the Champoeg District (now Marion County) southwest of the now city of Salem. Once Oregon became a U.S. territory in 1848, Congress passed the Donation Land Claim Act in 1850, and the Gesners were able to secure their claim to their farm. The younger Gesner was educated at Willamette University in Salem before a brief teaching career. He taught in Independence in 1865 where he was the first teacher in a new school and the first teacher for that school district.

== Career ==
Gesner left teaching after a single year to pursue manual labor and spent a year chopping firewood to enable him to buy a 30-acre (120,000 m^{2}) farm near his parents' property. In 1872, he started working in the land surveying field, working for Jasper Wilkins, a deputy surveyor for the federal government. The following year he went into the business himself, receiving a contract to survey land in the McKenzie River Valley in the southern portion of the Willamette Valley. Gesner continued in the business until 1908, in the process surveying public lands primarily in western Oregon and some in what became the state of Washington. Gesner married Rhoda E. Neal on October 14, 1875. In 1882, he and Wilkins bought the Oregon Statesman newspaper, though Gesner sold-out his share eight months later.

== Public service ==
In 1872, when he started surveying land he was elected as Marion County's surveyor. Gesner won election again and served from 1876 to 1878 as well. On March 2, 1884, he became the Indian agent to the Warm Springs Indian Reservation in Central Oregon after accepting an appointment from U.S. President Chester A. Arthur. The next year he left the position after 18 months as a new administration was in power in Washington, DC. He was also a member of Oregon's militia for nine years, including nearly three years as a captain.

Gesner was elected as the surveyor of the city of Salem in 1889 and served until 1891. In 1894, he was elected to the Oregon State Senate as a Republican. Serving a four-year term, he represented District 4 that included both Clackamas and Marion counties. Gesner was in both the 1895 and 1897 sessions of the legislature, with the 1897 session fruitless as the Oregon House of Representatives failed to organize.

== Later years and family ==
Gesner had three children with his wife Rhoda; Leroy, Rhoda and Stella. He was a member of the Ancient Order of United Workmen, the Masonic Order, and the Sons of the American Revolution. Both a brother and nephew also worked as surveyors. Alonzo Gesner died in Salem on March 6, 1912, at the age of 70 and was buried at Salem Pioneer Cemetery.
