= 1989–1990 Vendée Globe =

Vendée Globe 1989–1990
Event title
- Name: Vendée Globe 1989–1990
- Edition: 1st Edition
- Sponsor: Vendee Region of France

Event details
- Start location: Les Sables-d'Olonne
- Finish location: Les Sables-d'Olonne
- Course: Single person non-stop round the world race
- Start date: 26 November 1989
- Finish date: 26 November 1989
- Yachts: IMOCA 50 and IMOCA 60
- Key people: Race Director; Denis Horeau

Competitors
- Competitors: 13
- Competing nations: 3

Results
- (gold) Gold: Titouan Lamazou (FRA)
- (silver) Silver: Loïck Peyron (FRA)
- (bronze) Bronze: Jean-Luc Van Den Heede (FRA)

The 1989–1990 Vendée Globe Challenge, which later became the first edition of the Vendée Globe, was a non-stop round the world sailing race, sailed west to east. The start was 26 November 1989 from Les Sables-d'Olonne. Thirteen boats started and seven finished due to multiple abandonments, which is common in this "Everest of the Sea" that is the Vendée Globe. It was won by Titouan Lamazou on 15 March 1990 creating the first benchmark of the event, a record that stood until the 1996–1997 edition.

== Background ==
The inaugural Vendée Globe set off from Les Sables d'Olonne on 26 November 1989. Frenchman Titouan Lamazou, sailing Ecureuil d'Aquitaine II, won the race with a time of 109 days.

Philippe Jeantot, Vendée Globe founder, had problems with breakdowns, and then unfavorable winds, which held him back from the race lead. Philippe Poupon's ketch Fleury Michon X capsized in the Southern Ocean; and Poupon was rescued by Loïck Peyron, who finally finished second, in what was generally a successful first run of the race. Mike Plant, the lone American in the race, disqualified himself after receiving minor assistance near Campbell Island, New Zealand after a $5 rigging part on his sloop, Duracell, was damaged in the Pacific Ocean. Plant was scored Did not finish, but to the admiring French, he emerged a real hero after repairing the rigging and finishing the course as an unofficial competitor in 135 days, a new American single-handed circumnavigation record.

Race Director for the first edition was Denis Horeau, who went on to run further editions of the race.

== Competitors ==
=== Profile Pictures ===
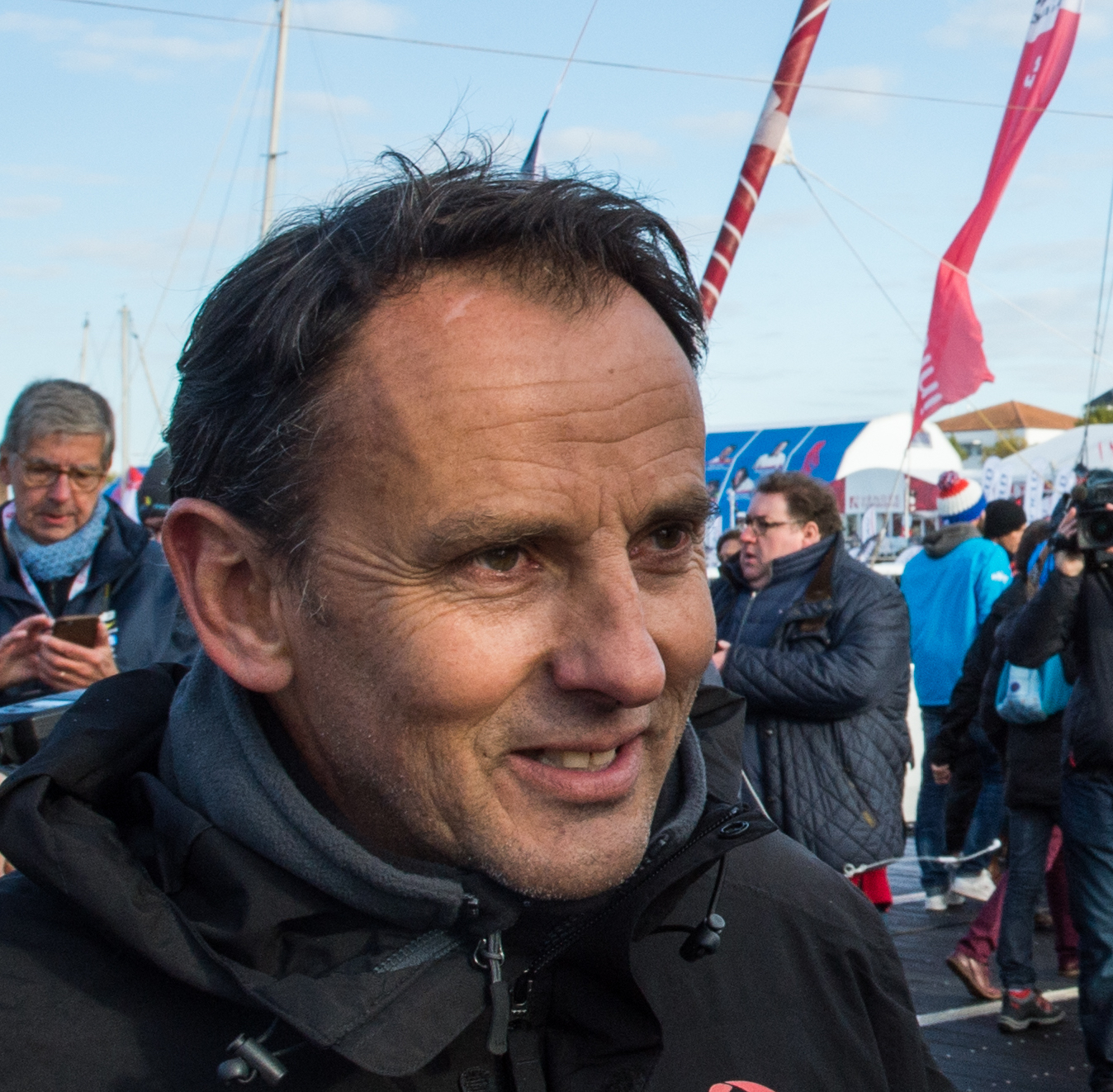
Alain Gautier (FRA) Generali Concorde

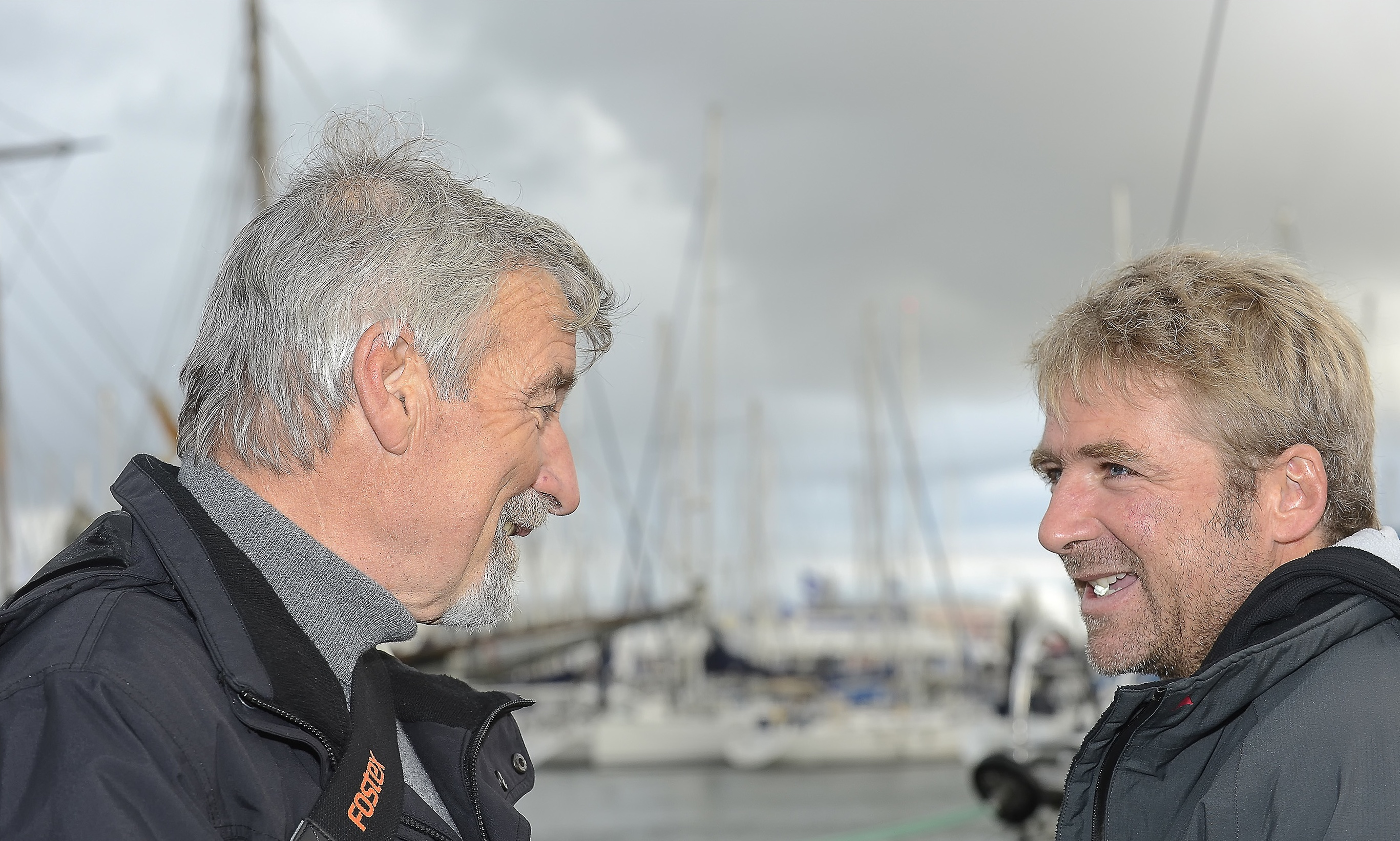
Jean-Luc Van Den Heede (FRA) 36.15 MET

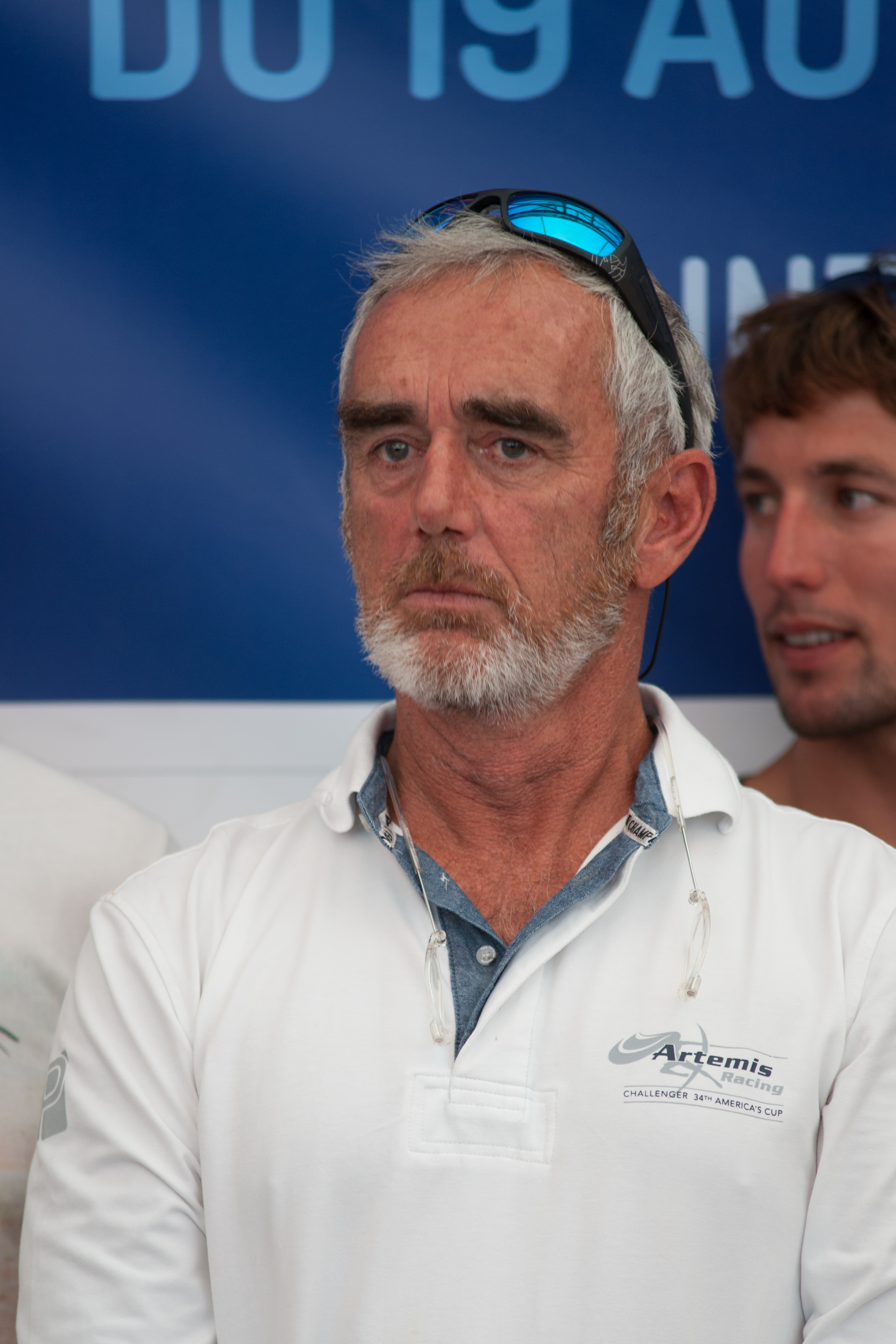
Loïck Peyron (FRA) Lada Poch

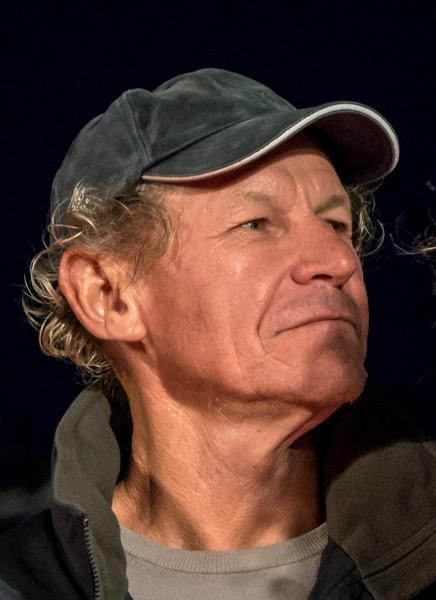
Philippe Poupon (FRA) Fleury Michon X

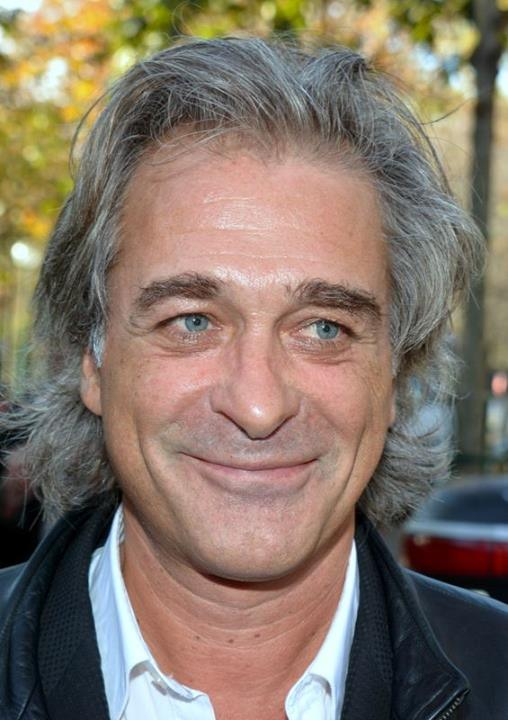
Titouan Lamazou (FRA) Écureuil d'Aquitaine II

=== Entries Information ===
Participants 1989–1990
Participant	Name	Architect	Boat builder	Year launched	Notes	Reference
Alain Gautier (FRA)	Generali Concorde	Jean-Marie Finot	Le Guen-Hémidy	1989		
Bertie Reed (RSA)	Grinaker	Martin	JJ Provoyeur (AFS]	1989		
Guy Bernardin (FRA)	O'Kay	Bruce Farr	Kiwi Builder	1986		
Jean-François Coste (FRA)	Cacharel / Pen Duick III	Éric Tabarly	Chantiers et ateliers de la Perrière	1967		
Jean-Yves Terlain (FRA)	UAP	Joubert-Nivelt	chantier Hervé et Pinta	1986		
Jean-Luc Van Den Heede (FRA)	36.15 MET	Philippe Harlé; Alain Mortain	Garcia	1989		
Loïck Peyron (FRA)	Lada Poch	Luc Bouvet; Olivier Petit	Chantier Couach	1986		
Mike Plant (USA)	Duracell	Rodger Martin	Mike Plant; JF Galvao	1989		
Patrice Carpentier (FRA)	Nouvel Observateur	Robert Nikerson		1985		
Pierre Follenfant (FRA)	TBS-Charente Maritime	Joubert-Nivelt	Chantier Hervé et Pinta	1989		
Philippe Jeantot (FRA)	Crédit Agricole IV	Marc Lombard	Jeantot Marine	1989		
Philippe Poupon (FRA)	Fleury Michon X	Philippe Briand	ATA Jeanneau	1989		
Titouan Lamazou (FRA)	Écureuil d'Aquitaine II	Luc Bouvet; Olivier Petit	Chantier Capitaine Flint	1989		

== Results ==
Table: Order of Finish, 1989–1990 Vendée Globe
Pos	Sailor	Yacht	Time	Ref.
1	Titouan Lamazou (FRA)	Ecureuil d'Aquitaine II	109d 08h 48' 50"	
2	Loïck Peyron (FRA)	Lada Poch	110d 01h 18' 06"	
3	Jean-Luc Van Den Heede (FRA)	36.15 MET	112d 01h 14' 00"	
4	Philippe Jeantot (FRA)	Crédit Agricole IV	113d 23h 47' 47"	
5	Pierre Follenfant (FRA)	TBS-Charente Maritime	114d 21h 09' 06"	
6	Alain Gautier (FRA)	Generali Concorde	132d 13h 01' 48"	
7	Jean-François Coste (FRA)	Cacharel	163d 01h 19' 20"	
DNF	Mike Plant (USA)	Duracell	Received minor assistance (New Zealand) but completed the course in 135 days	
DNF	Patrice Carpentier (FRA)	Nouvel Observateur	Damaged auto-pilot (Falklands)	
DNF	(South Africa) Bertie Reed	Grinaker	Damaged rudder	
DNF	Jean-Yves Terlain (FRA)	UAP	Dismasted	
DNF	Philippe Poupon (FRA)	Fleury Michon X	Capsized	
DNF	Guy Bernardin (FRA)	O'Kay	Medical Issue Toothache	

== Incidents ==
- Philippe Poupon's boat was struck by a wave and ended up lying heeled at 90 degrees. Loïck Peyron, in a remarkable bit of seamanship, took the boat in tow, and after Philippe Poupon detached the mast the boat righted itself. A film of the event can be seen here.
- Jean-Yves Terlain dismasted south of Cape Town.
- Guy Bernardin was forced to retire due to a dental problem and made a stopover in Australia
