= Dominique Provoyeur =

South African sailor

Personal information
- Nationality: South African
- Born: 3 March 1977 (age 48); Cape Town, South Africa

Sport
- Sport: Sailing

Dominique Provoyeur (born 3 March 1977) is a South African sailor. She competed in the Yngling event at the 2008 Summer Olympics.

== Personal life ==
Dominique Provoyeur is the daughter of round-the-world yachtsman and boatbuilder, Jean-Jacques Provoyeur.
