= Worcester College (disambiguation) =

Worcester College, Oxford is one of the constituent colleges of the University of Oxford in England.

Worcester College may also refer to:

== England ==
- New College Worcester, formerly Worcester College for the Blind
- University of Worcester, formerly University College Worcester and before that Worcester College of Higher Education
- Worcester College of Technology
- Worcester Sixth Form College

== United States ==
- Worcester Polytechnic Institute
- Worcester State University

== See also ==
- College of Wooster, Ohio, United States
- Worcester (disambiguation)
