= Jean-François Coste (sailor) =

French sailor (1951-2026)

Jean-Francois Coste
- Coste, days before the start of the 1989 Vendée Globe Challenge
- Born: June 1951; Neuilly-sur-Seine, France
- Died: 8 July 2026 (aged 75); Vouzon, France
- Occupation: Sailor

Jean-François Coste (19 June 1951 – 8 July 2026) was a French sailor who competed in and completed the first Vendée Globe in 1989. He gained extensive sailing experience crewing for Éric Tabarly together with fellow Vendée pioneer Philippe Poupon. Coste was born on 19 June 1951 in Neuilly-sur-Seine and died on 8 July 2026 in Vouzon, at the age of 75.
