= Dudley Dix =

Personal information
- Full name: Dudley Allen Dix
- Nationality: RSA & USA
- Born: 7 May 1949; Cape Town RSA

Sport
- Sport: Sailing

Dudley Dix is a yacht designer, of South African origin, now based in Virginia Beach, US. He graduated from the Westlawn School of Yacht Design. He is notable for having developed the "radius chine plywood" method as a basis for boat construction. Dix won the 1979 Cruising World Design Competition.

Dix has designed yachts of many types (such as monohulls, catamarans and trimarans) employing a variety of materials for the hulls (such as steel, aluminium and wood/epoxy composites). His building methods include cold moulding and radius chine plywood. The radius chine plywood method was developed by Dix himself, and many of his designs use this procedure. The radius chine plywood method enables fast, cheap construction of relatively lightweight vessels. Dix is particularly concerned that his designs are fully seaworthy.

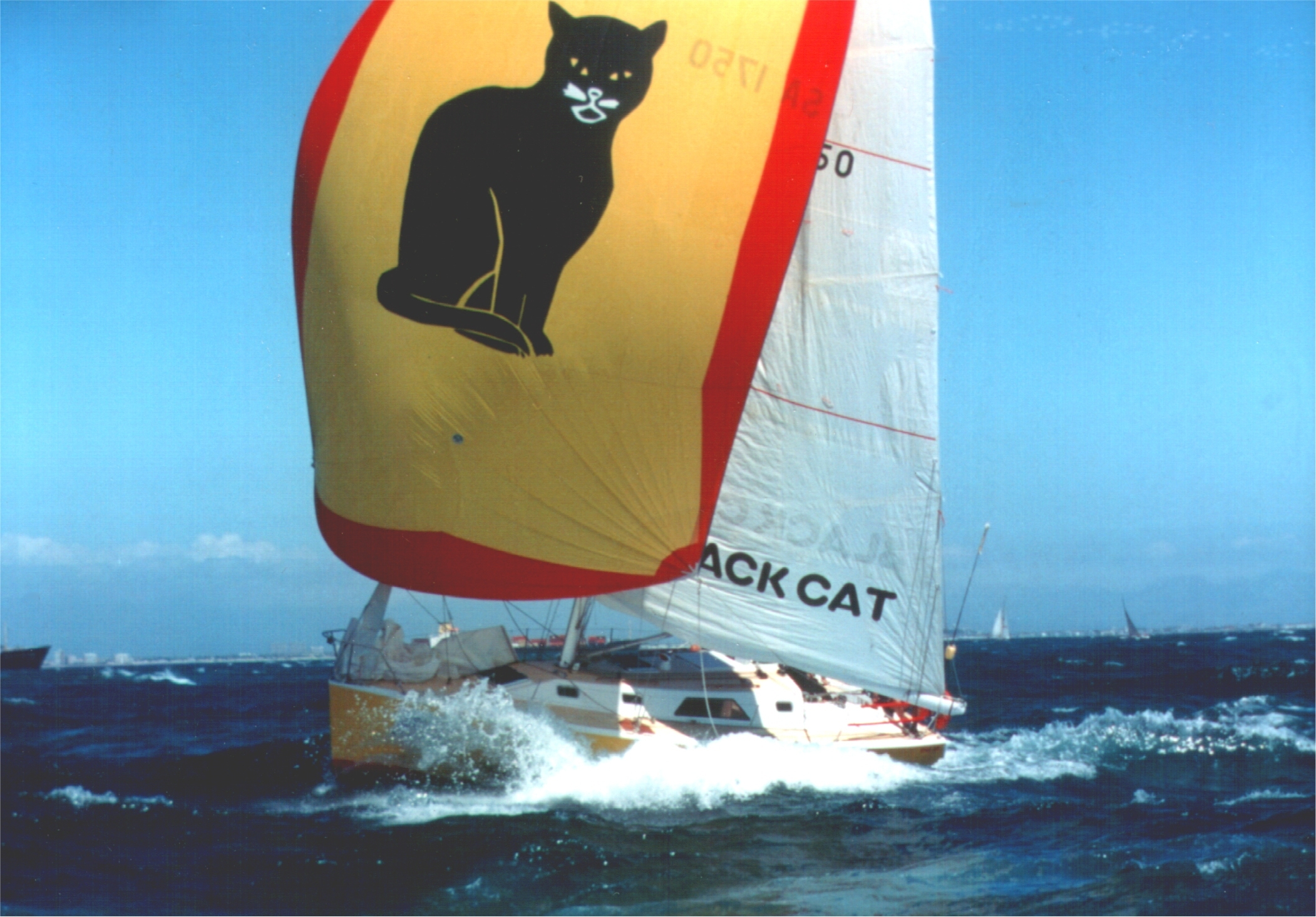
Didi 38 "Black Cat" at start of Cape to Rio Race 1996.

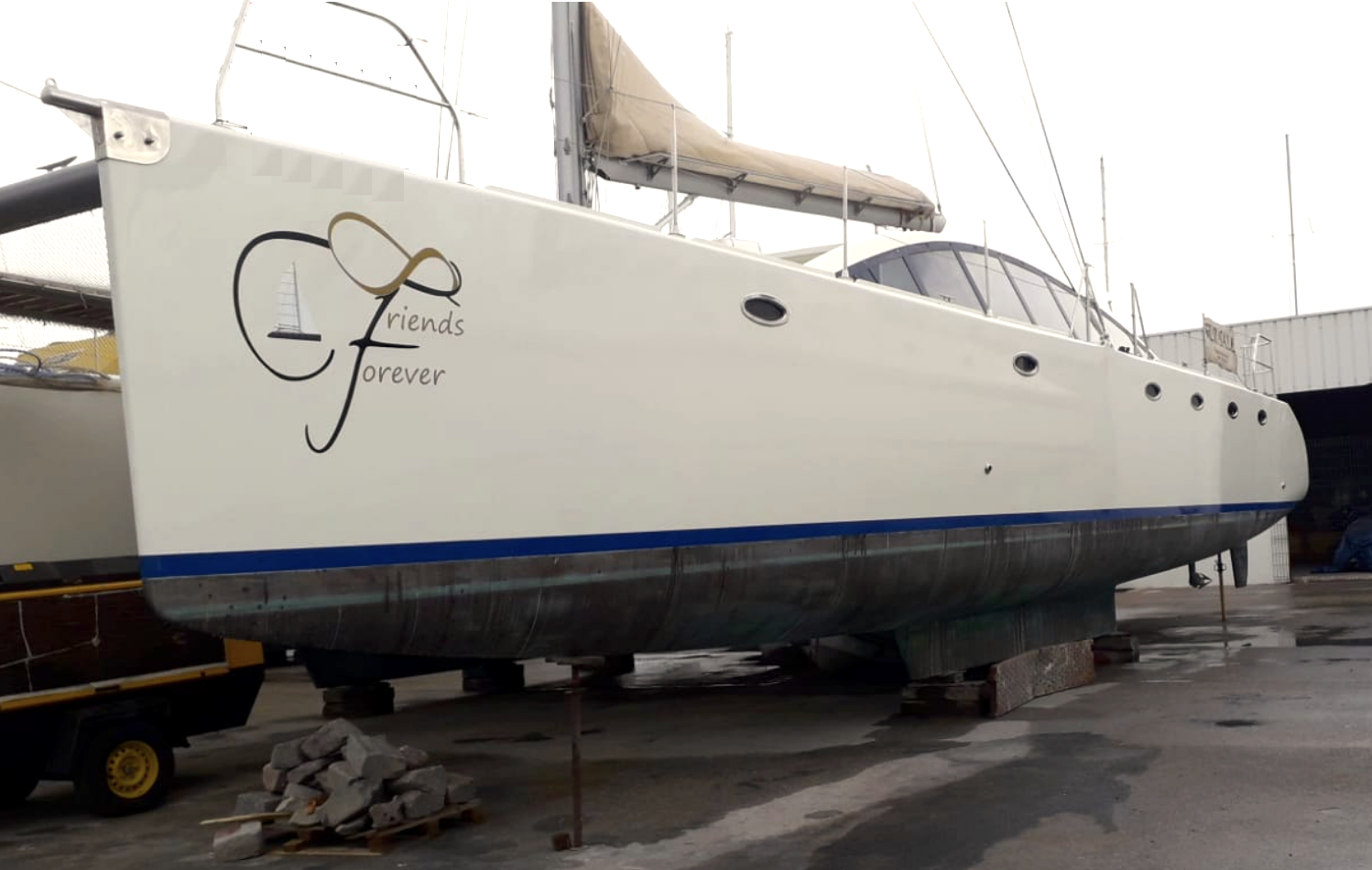
55' radius chine plywood catamaran - "Friends Forever"

Dix has built many of his own designs for his personal use, including the Didi 38 "Black Cat" which he sailed from 1995 until 2000 (including three crossings of the South Atlantic).

One of Dix's larger designs is the 55' DH550 ocean-going cruising catamaran, such as "Friends Forever" (built by Jean-Jacques Provoyeur and Richard Bertie).

== See also ==
- Dudley Dix interview
