= Ted Moores =

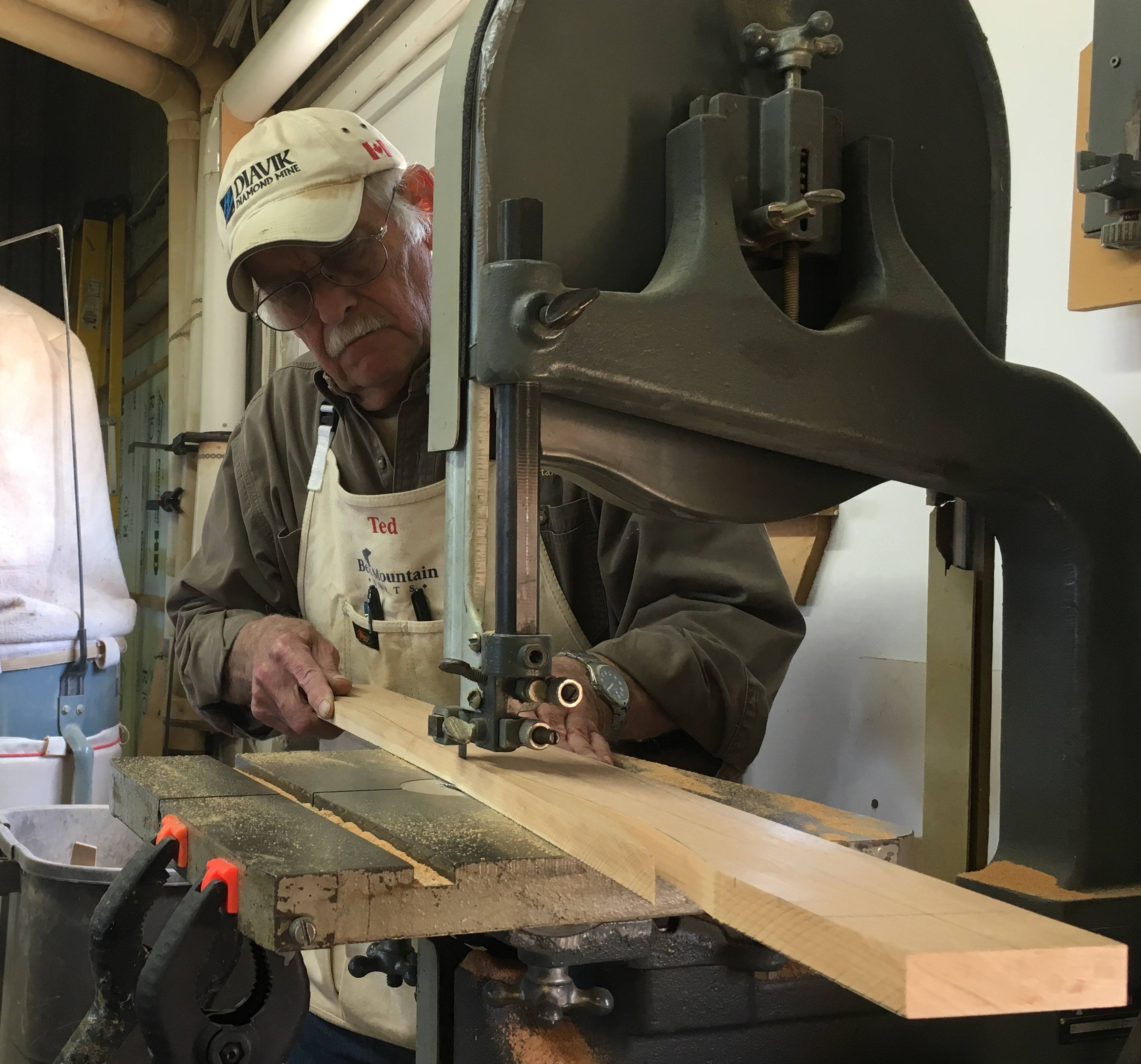
Moores giving a demonstration in his Peterborough workshop

Ted Moores (born June 25, 1943) is a Canadian boat builder, author, and educator. His book Canoecraft has sold over 300,000 copies worldwide.

Moores is best known for duplicating a method of building canoes first developed in Minnesota by Irvin C. Peterson, Karl Ketter, and Eugene B. Jensen using woodstrip epoxy techniques, a style well-suited to the home builder. By applying thin layers of fibreglass to either side of a wooden hull, Moores' canoes employ the principles of core-composite construction in a design that is both durable and lighter than traditional rib-and-plank construction.

== Life and work ==
Moores began his canoe building career in 1972, working with Greavette Boat Works of Gravenhurst, Ontario. He opened his first business, Sundance Canoe Company, in 1972. He sold Sundance a year later and founded Bear Mountain Boats in 1977. Initially based in Chisholm township, the company eventually moved to Peterborough, Ontario, before relocating to Westport, Ontario in 2017. It continues to operate under the management of Moores and his partner Joan Barrett, selling boat building materials and hosting educational workshops.

In 1983, Moores released Canoecraft, a how-to manual for home canoe builders, which has been called "the definitive guide to wood-strip canoe construction." In 2010, woodworker and actor Nick Offerman appeared in the video Fine Woodstrip Canoebuilding, a visual companion piece to Canoecraft. Other instructional books by Moores include Kayakcraft and Kayaks You Can Build. Writing as a historian, he contributed a chapter on the evolution of canoe manufacturing in Canada to the anthology The Canoe: A Living Tradition. He has also worked as an instructor for WoodenBoat School and the San Francisco Maritime Museum.

Moores has been an important figure in the development of the Canadian C4 and C15 racing canoes, supplying over 85 sprint canoe clubs nationally. He has experimented with solar-powered designs on his 30' fantail launch Sparks and worked on some high-profile restorations, including a hydroplane speedboat, Tempo VII, which had been owned and piloted by Guy Lombardo. A canoe built by Moores was presented as a wedding gift from Canadian prime minister Pierre Trudeau to celebrate the wedding of Prince Charles and Lady Diana.

== Selected publications ==
- Canoecraft: An Illustrated Guide to Fine Woodstrip Construction ISBN 1552093425
- Kayakcraft: Fine Woodstrip Kayak Construction ISBN 0937822566
- Kayaks You Can Build: An Illustrated Guide to Plywood Construction ISBN 1552978613
- The Canoe: A Living Tradition (chapter, "From Forest to Factory: Innovations and Mass Production") ISBN 1554070805
