= Wooster Street =

Wooster Street may refer to:

- Wooster Street (Manhattan) in SoHo (Manhattan), New York City, New York
- Wooster Street (New Haven) in Wooster Square, New Haven, Connecticut
- Wooster Street in Bowling Green, Ohio (part of Ohio State Route 64)
- Wooster Street in Shelton, Connecticut (part of Connecticut Route 108)
