= Worcester, Limpopo =

Worcester
- Location within Limpopo Location within South Africa
- Coordinates: 24.317°S 30.555°E
- Country: South Africa
- Province: Limpopo
- District: Mopani
- Municipality: Maruleng

Area
  - Total: 1.75 km^{2} (0.68 sq mi)

Population (2011)
  - Total: 1,004
  - Density: 574/km^{2} (1,490/sq mi)

Racial makeup (2011)
  - Black African: 99.9%
  - Indian/Asian: 0.1%

First languages (2011)
  - Northern Sotho: 98.0%
  - Other: 2.0%
- Time zone: UTC+2 (SAST)
- Postal code (street): 6850
- PO box: 6849
- Area code: 023

Worcester is a town in Mopani District Municipality in the Limpopo province of South Africa.

Famous people born in Worcester include round-the-world yachtsman Jean-Jacques Provoyeur.
