= John H. Moores =

American businessman and politician

Member of the Oregon State Senate
- In office 1870–1874
- Constituency: Marion County

Mayor of Salem, Oregon
- In office 1864, 1866-1868

Personal details
- Born: June 26, 1821 Huntsville, Alabama
- Died: December 16, 1880 (aged 59) Salem, Oregon
- Party: Republican
- Spouse: Virginia Lafayette Lamon

John Henry Moores (June 26, 1821–December 16, 1880) was an American businessman and politician in the state of Oregon. The son of Isaac R. Moores, he was born in Alabama and moved to the Oregon Territory in 1852. In Oregon, he would serve in the Oregon State Senate and as the mayor of Salem.

== Early life ==
John Henry Moores was born in Huntsville, Alabama, on June 26, 1821. He was the oldest child of Isaac R. Moores and Jane Alexander. He grew up in Danville, Illinois, before moving to Benton, Missouri, where he began working. Moores married Virginia Lafayette Lamon (July 14, 1825 – June 9, 1897) on May 11, 1847.

== Oregon ==
In 1851, Moores returned to Danville before heading west over the Oregon Trail to the Oregon Territory in March 1852. John joined his family in this trek, and all arrived in November 1852 in Portland. He then moved to Salem in March 1853. In 1856, he went into business with his younger brother Isaac R. Moores, Jr., operating a mercantile store in Salem until 1865. They would build the brick Moores block in that city, now site of the Pioneer Trust Building.

In 1858, Moores served as mayor of Salem for a brief time prior to the city charter legally passing the state legislature, after he had already served on the city's first city council. He returned to the post of mayor in 1864, and then served three consecutive terms from 1866 to 1869. In 1870, he was elected to the Oregon State Senate. He served four years, representing Marion County as a Republican. John Moores also served as Marion County Treasurer and on the board of trustees at Willamette University. Additionally, he was on the board of directors for the Salem school district and the Oregon State Agricultural Society.

Moores would buy the South Salem Flour and Lumber Mills, selling off part of it in the 1870s while combining the timber interest with the Capital Lumbering Company. He worked as manager and secretary of the company beginning in June 1876, until his death. Along with George H. Atkinson, he selected the site of the Oregon State Insane Asylum (now Oregon State Hospital) and the Oregon State Penitentiary as part of a special commission.

== Later years and family ==
John's wife Virginia was a founding member of Salem's Children's Aid Society in 1865. Children of John and Virginia were Charles B., Albert, Gertrude, Bertha, Carrie, and Althea. Charles would later serve in the Oregon House of Representatives and was Speaker of the chamber in 1895. The couple were also members of the First Methodist Episcopal Church in Salem. John Henry Moores died on December 16, 1880, at the age of 59 in Salem. He was buried at Salem Pioneer Cemetery where many in his family are buried.
