= Wooster Nagar =

- village
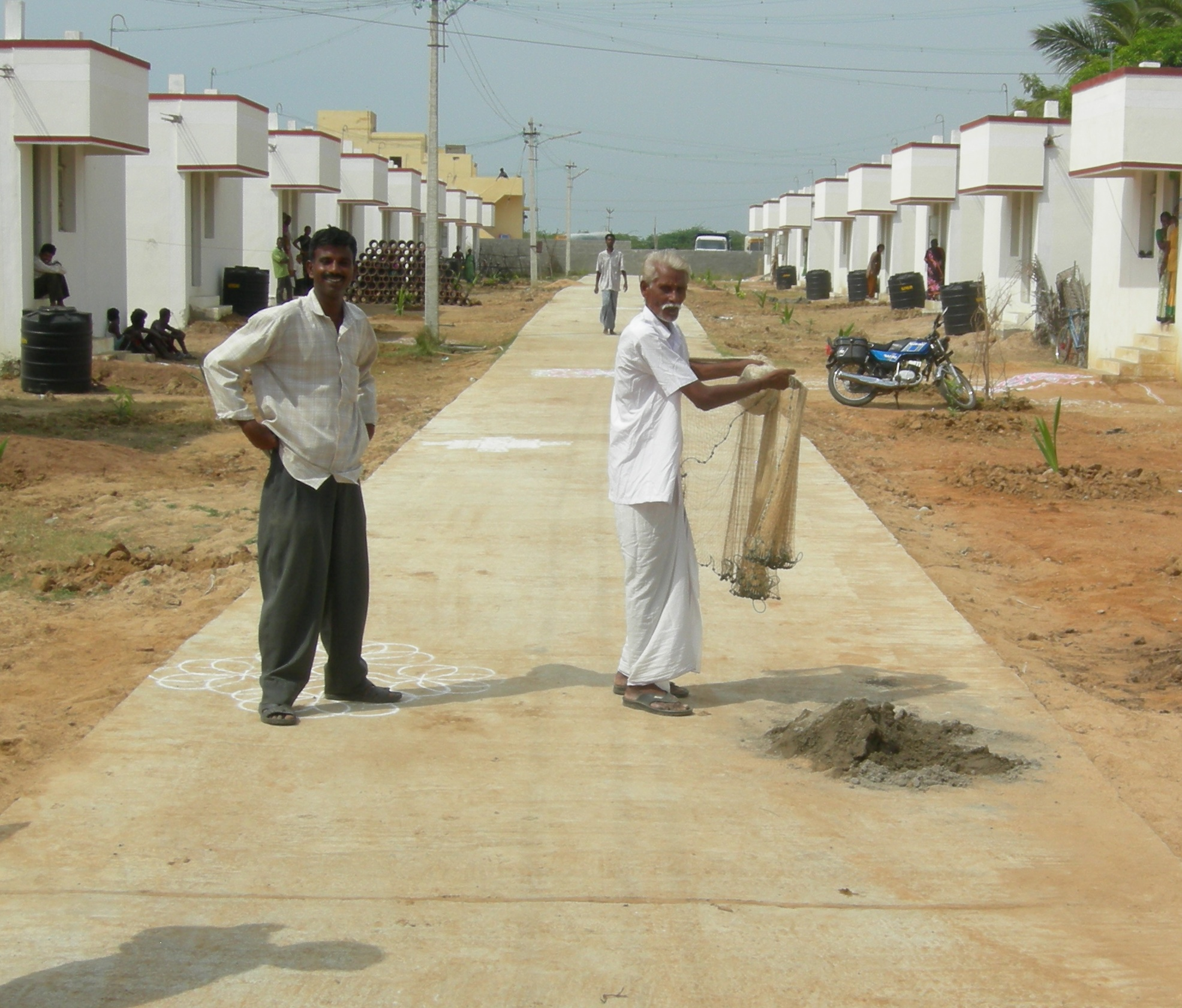
- A fisherman in Wooster Nagar demonstrates his net-throwing technique.

- Location in Tamil Nadu, India Wooster Nagar (India)
- Coordinates: 12.499431°N 80.147195°E
- Country: India
- State: Tamil Nadu

Languages
  - Official: Tamil
- Time zone: UTC+5:30 (IST)

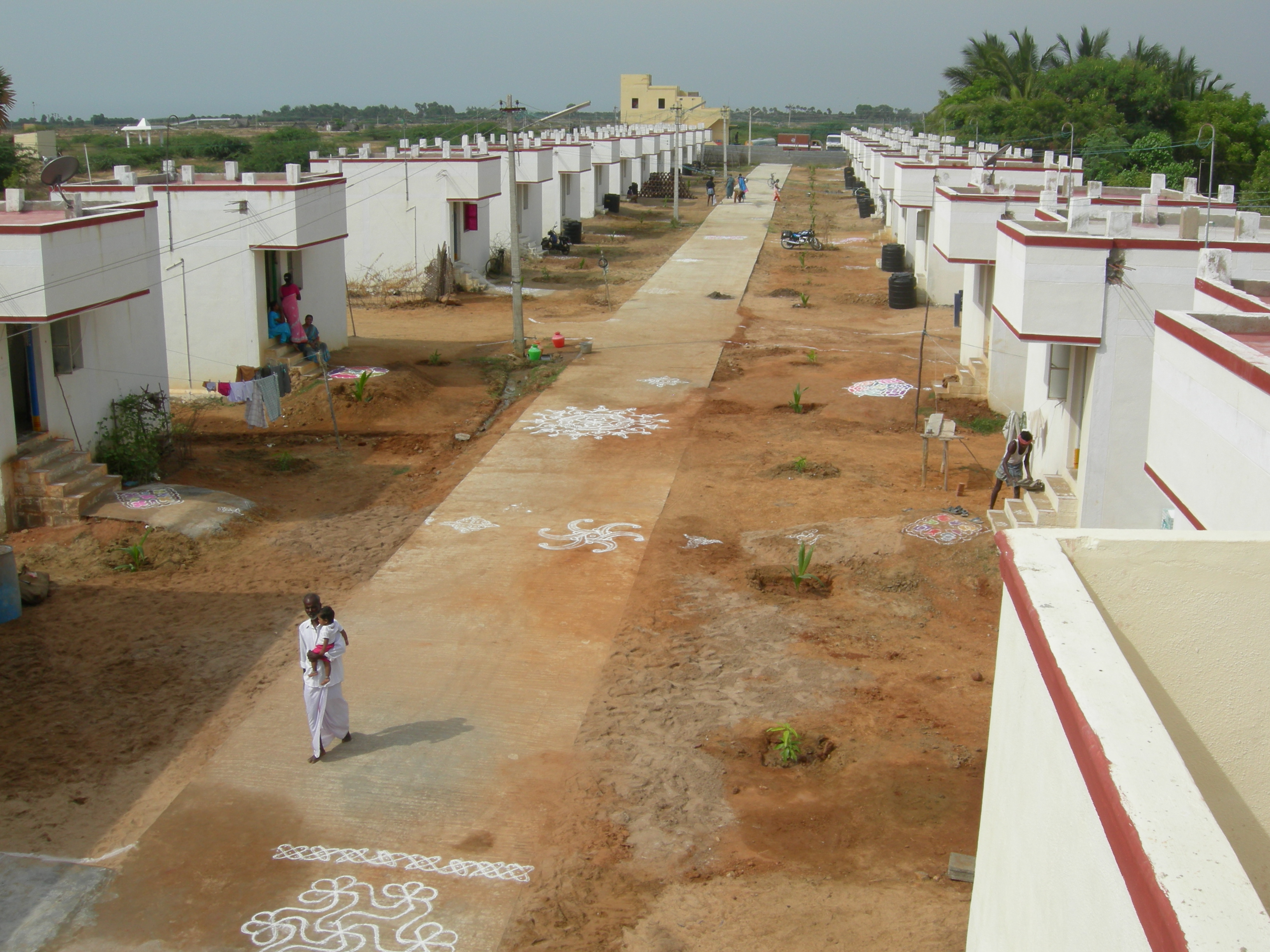
The main street of Wooster Nagar. The English translation is "Noble Street". The white rice-powder patterns on the walks are known as kolams.

Wooster Nagar is the name of a small fishing village in Chengalpattu district in the state of Tamil Nadu, India. Dedicated 3 January 2007, the village consists of 26 homes built with funds donated by citizens of Wooster, Ohio USA. In recognition of these donations, the village residents renamed their village Wooster Nagar. "Nagar" is from Sanskrit and means city.

The village is located at Pudupattinam, just inland from the Indian Ocean coastline, an hour south of Chennai, the capital of Tamil Nadu. Village residents, employed as inland waters fishermen, saw their nearby homes completely destroyed by the December 2004 tsunami which hit, among other areas, the eastern coast of India.
