= USS Worcester =

USS Worcester has been the name of three ships in the United States Navy.

- USS Worcester (1866) a bark-rigged screw steam sloop-of-war that was launched in 1866.
- USS Worcester (PG-170) was renamed USS Gladwyne (PF-62) before it was laid down as a Tacoma-class frigate in 1943.
- USS Worcester (CL-144) was the lead ship of the Worcester-class cruisers.
