= Two-Handed Trans-Atlantic Race =

Yacht race

The Two-Handed TransAtlantic Race (TwoSTAR) is a yacht race first held in 1981. It is held approximately every four years with the last event in 2024. The next race is announced for 2028.

== See also ==
- Single-Handed Trans-Atlantic Race
