= Former =

Manufacturing tools used to give form to a malleable object

A former is an object, such as a template, gauge, or cutting die, which is used to form something such as a boat's hull. Typically, a former gives shape to a structure that may have complex curvature.

A former may become an integral part of the finished structure, as in an aircraft fuselage, or it may be removable, being used in the construction process and then discarded or re-used.

== Aircraft formers ==
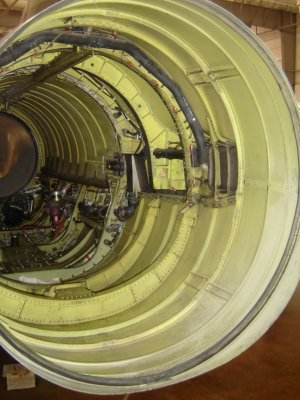
Interior of an F-16B with the engine removed showing frames or formers

Formers are used in the construction of aircraft fuselage, of which a typical fuselage has a series from the nose cone to the empennage, typically perpendicular to the longitudinal axis of the aircraft. The primary purpose of formers is to establish the shape of the fuselage and reduce the column length of stringers to prevent instability. Formers are typically attached to longerons, which support the skin of the aircraft.

The "former-and-longeron" technique (also called stations and stringers) was adopted from boat construction and was typical of light aircraft built until the advent of structural skins, such as fiberglass and other composite materials. Many of today's light aircraft, and homebuilt aircraft in particular, are still designed in this way.

== Disposable formers ==
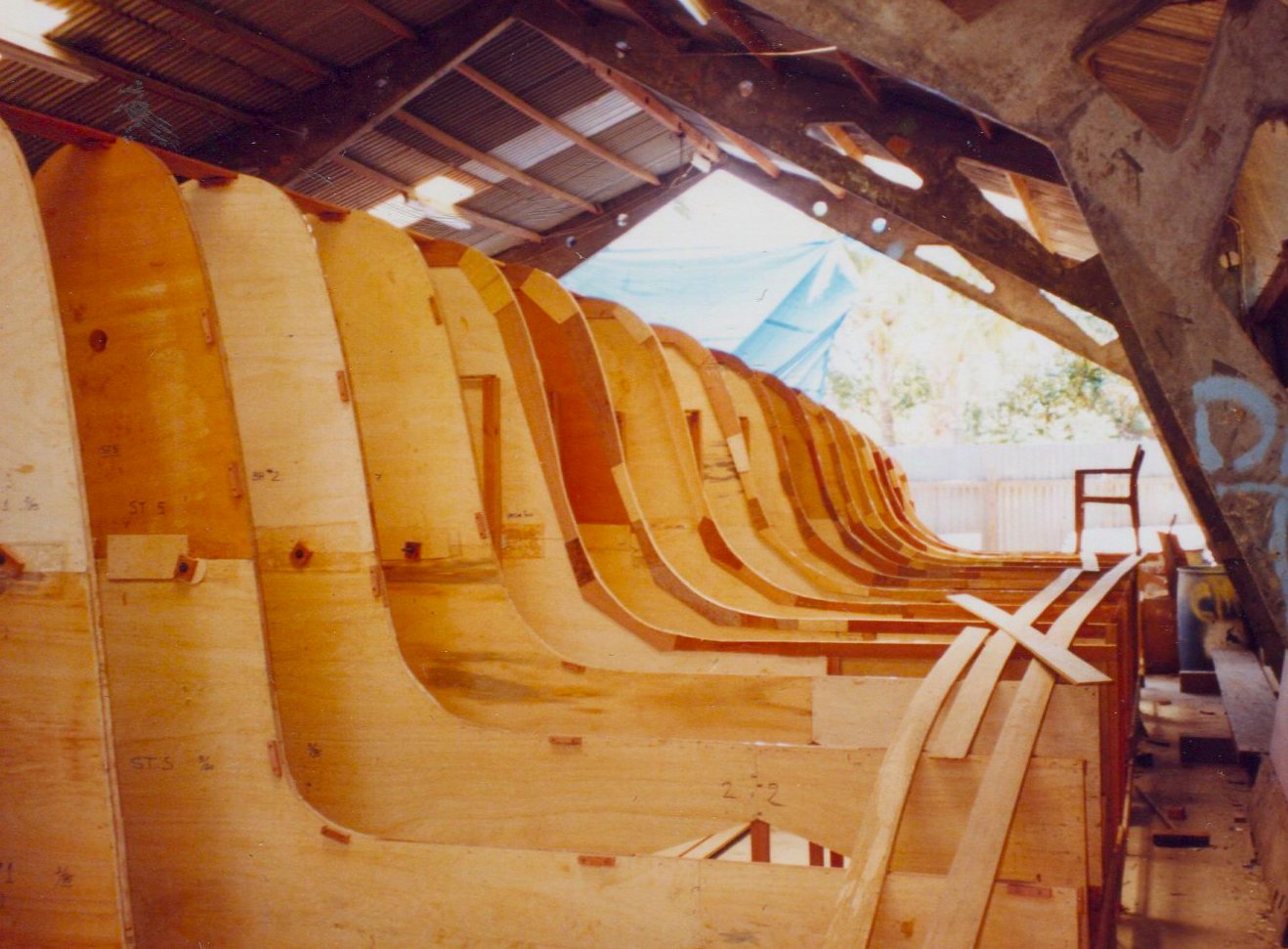
Plywood formers await the application of strip planks on a strip-built catamaran.

A former may instead be a temporary shape over which a structure is built, the former subsequently being discarded in whole or part, as follows:

- Strip-built boat construction uses formers over which thin plank strips are applied and glued. In some cases, some of the formers may be incorporated as structural ribs.
- In civil engineering, bridge building, and architecture, arches may be built upon a wooden former, which is removed once the keystone is securely in place.
