= Audrey Moores =

Romanian chemist

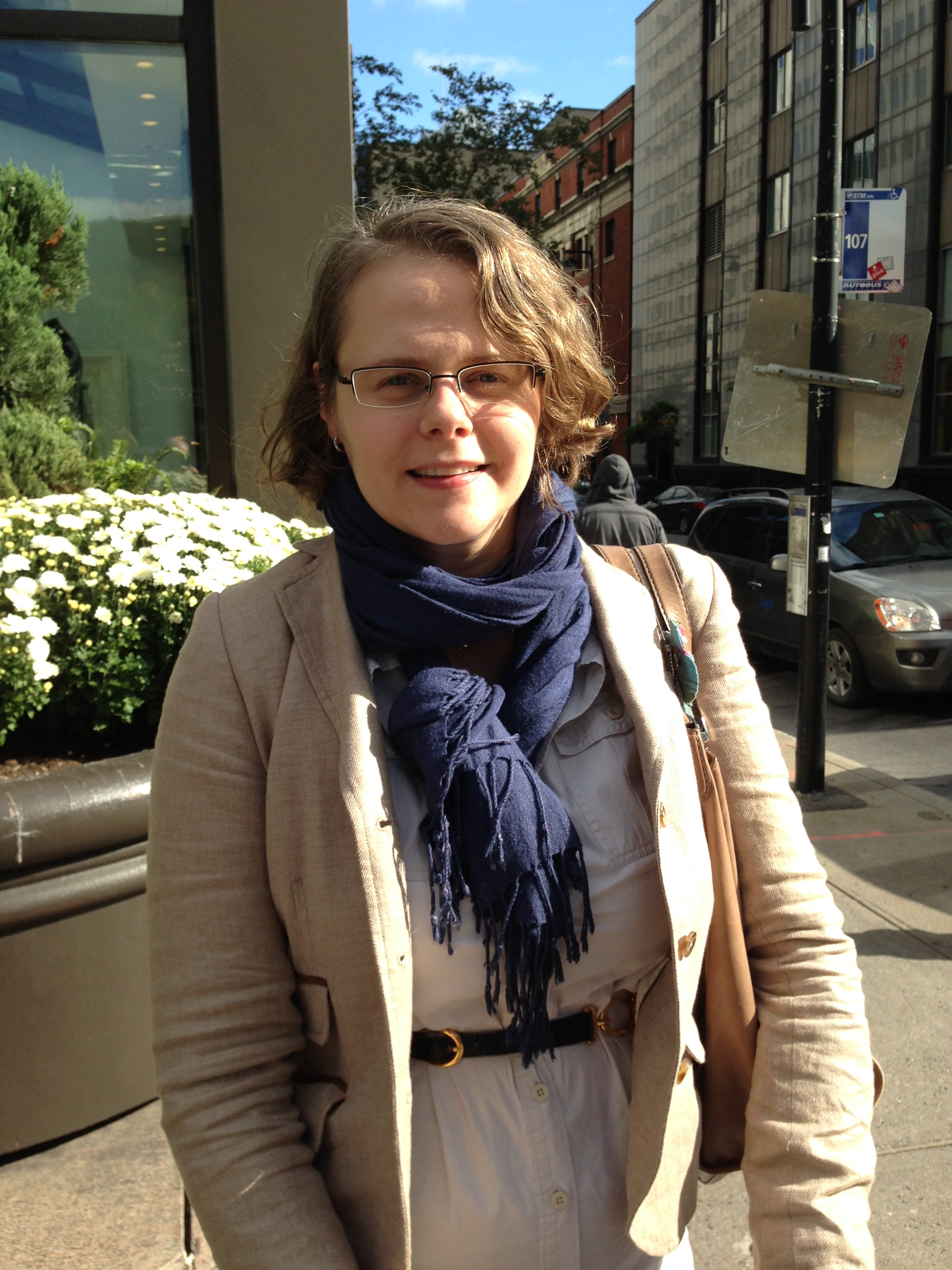
- Education: Ecole Polytechnique; Yale University
- Scientific career
- Fields: Sustainable Chemistry, Catalysis, Biomass
- Workplaces: McGill University since 2007
- Doctoral advisor: Pascal Le Floch
- Other academic advisors: Robert H. Crabtree
- Website: www.mooresresearch.org

Audrey Moores is a Professor of Chemistry (2007 – present) and Tier II Canada Research Chair (2007-2017) in green chemistry at McGill University. She was named an emerging investigator in 2017 by the RSC journal Green Chemistry.

== Biography ==
She completed her PhD from the École Polytechnique in 2005 under the supervision of Pascal Le Floch and was a post-doctoral fellow at Yale University in 2006 under the supervision of Robert H. Crabtree. She began her independent career at McGill University in January 2007 as an Assistant Professor and was named Associate Professor in 2014.

Moores' research focuses on different aspects of green chemistry, such as catalysis and biobased materials. In particular, she worked on the use of iron and iron oxide nanoparticles as catalysts or magnetically recyclable supports for hydrogenation and oxidation reactions. She developed novel methods to prepare nanomaterials under solvent-free conditions, and explored the catalytic properties of plasmonic nanoparticles. Since 2018, she has received national media coverage for working on transforming shrimp shell waste into biodegradable plastics.

=== Academic leadership ===
Moores was co-associate director of the Center for Green Chemistry and Catalysis from 2012-2016. From 2016 to 2019, she was the scientific director in the board of GreenCentre Canada. She is associate director of the Facility for Electron Microscopy Research at McGill since 2017. Since 2017, Audrey is one of the three co-leaders of Materials group of the McGill Sustainable Systems Initiative (MSSI). She is an advisory board member of the ACS Green Chemistry Institute and Associate Editor for ACS Sustainable Chemistry & Engineering.

=== Awards ===
Moores was recognized as one of the three finalists for the McGill Principal's prize for public engagement through media in 2019. In 2019 she received a Fessenden Professorship awarded by the Faculty of Science at McGill University towards the commercial development of her discovery on the clean transformation of crustacean shells into valuable biopolymer chitosan. In 2020 she was selected to be among the 250 future Canadian leaders for the Governor General’s Canadian Leadership Conference and nominated as a session co-chair. In 2020 she also became a member of the College of New Scholars of the Royal Society of Canada. In 2024, she will co chair the Gordon Research Conference in Green Chemistry. In 2021, Moores received the Canadian Chemistry and Chemical Engineering Award for Green Chemistry from the Canadian Society for Chemistry.
