= Noah Worcester =

American pacifist and clergyman (1758–1837)

Noah Worcester (November 25, 1758 – October 31, 1837) was a Unitarian clergyman and a seminal figure in the history of American pacifism.

== Life ==
Worcester was born in Hollis, New Hampshire, to a father of the same name, who had been one of the framers of the New Hampshire constitution. At age 16, he joined the militia as a fifer during the Revolutionary War, and was at the battle of Bunker Hill, where he narrowly escaped being taken prisoner. He was also at Bennington as a fife major.

In September 1778, he moved to Plymouth, New Hampshire, where he taught, and in February 1782, settled at Thornton, filling several local offices, and was chosen to the legislature. Having turned his attention to theology, he published a Letter to the Rev. John Murray Concerning the Origin of Evil (Newburyport, 1786), and was licensed to preach by a Congregational association in 1786. He became pastor of Thornton in 1787. In 1802 he was employed as Thorton's first missionary in the New Hampshire society then organized, and in that capacity preached and traveled extensively through the northern part of the state. In this period he commenced a prolific writing career, contributing numerous articles to theological and popular journals.

In 1810 he became a pastor in Salisbury, New Hampshire, where his ancestor William Worcester, an emigrant from Salisbury, England, had been the first minister. Three years later, in 1813 he accepted an invitation to edit The Christian Disciple, a Boston-based periodical founded by the eminent Unitarian minister William Ellery Channing and others, and moved to Brighton, Massachusetts.

Self-educated, he accustomed himself to rigorous mental discipline. Physically, Worcester presented the remarkable contrast of robust man "of uncommon strength", combined with unusual mildness of manner.

Worcester married twice. His first wife, Hannah Brown, died in 1797 after falling from a horse. The following year he married Hannah Huntington, of Norwich, Connecticut. He had four sons and six daughters by his first marriage.

His brother, Thomas (1768–1831), whose pulpit Noah had filled in Salisbury, was also a clergyman. Thomas wrote extensively on subjects related to Unitarianism and Trinitarianism. Another brother, Samuel (1770–1821), also a clergyman, was corresponding secretary of the American Board of Commissioners for Foreign Missions in 1810, and in 1815 engaged in the Unitarian controversy, his immediate opponent being William Ellery Channing.

Worcester was awarded an honorary arts degree by Dartmouth in 1791 and an honorary Doctor of Divinity by Harvard in 1818.

== Peace activism ==
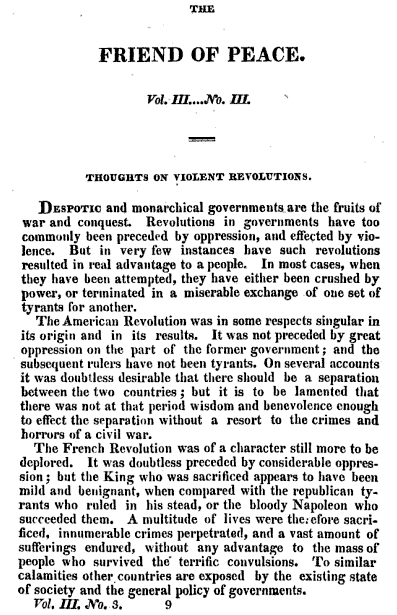
Friend of Peace, 1824

Although active in Unitarian theological controversies of the day, Worcester is best remembered as a pioneer in the American peace movement. In December 1814, he published A Solemn Review of the Custom of War (under the pen-name Philo Pacificus), still considered one of the best pieces of anti-war literature ever committed to print, and as relevant today as then. It was reprinted as the first of the London Peace Society's tracts for its membership.

In 1815, he founded the Massachusetts Peace Society, serving as its secretary until 1828. From 1819 to 1828 he tirelessly edited The Friend of Peace, a quarterly periodical of the Society, as well as wrote most of its content. In 1828, the Massachusetts Peace Society merged with the newly formed American Peace Society.

William Ellery Channing's eulogy for Worcester was published in 1837. Some measure of Worcester is gained by the following tribute by his friend and co-laborer Channing:

He was distinguished above all whom I have known, by his comprehension and deep feeling of the spirit of Christianity; by the sympathy with which he seized on the character of Jesus Christ as a manifestation of Perfect Love; by the honor in which he held the mild,- humble, forgiving, disinterested virtues of our religion. This distinguishing trait of his mind was embodied and brought out in his whole life and conduct. He especially expressed it in his labors for the promotion of Universal Peace on the earth. He was struck, as no other man within my acquaintance has been, with the monstrous incongruity between the spirit of Christianity and the spirit of Christian communities; between Christ's teaching of peace, mercy, forgiveness, and the wars which divide and desolate the church and the world. Every man has particular impressions which rule over and give a hue to his mind. Every man is struck by some evils rather than others. The excellent individual of whom I speak was shocked, heart-smitten, by nothing so much as by seeing that man hates man, that man destroys his brother, that man has drenched the earth with his brother's blood, that man, in his insanity, has crowned the murderer of his race with the highest honors; and, still worse, that Christian hates Christian, that church wars against church, that differences of forms and opinions array against each other those whom Christ died to join together in closest brotherhood, and that Christian zeal is spent in building up sects, rather than in spreading the spirit of Christ, and enlarging and binding together the universal church. The great evil on which his mind and heart fixed, was War, Discord, Intolerance, the substitution of force for Reason and Love. To spread peace on earth became the object of his life.

== Publications ==
He wrote:

- Familiar Dialogue between Cephas and Bereas (Worcester, 1792)
- Solemn Reasons for Declining to adopt the Baptist Theory and Practice (Charlestown, 1809)
- Bible News, or Sacred Truths Relating to the Living God, his only Son, and Holy Spirit (Concord, 1810) This was censured by the Hopkinsian association, of which the author was a member, as unsound on the doctrine of the Trinity.
- Respectful Address to the Trinitarian Clergy (Boston, 1812)
- A Solemn Review of the Custom of War (1814) This was republished in Europe in several languages.
- The Atoning Sacrifice: a Display of Love, not of Wrath (Cambridge, 1829)
- The Causes and Evils of Contentions among Christians (Boston, 1831)
- Last Thoughts on Important Subjects (Cambridge, 1833)

He edited:

- The Christian Disciple (ed. 1813–1818)
- The Friend of Peace (ed. 1819–1828)

He contributed to Theological Magazine.

== Sources ==
- Channing, William Ellery (1880). "The Philanthropist: A tribute to the memory of the Rev. Noah Worcester, D.D.". The Works of William E. Channing, D.D. (New and complete rearranged ed.). Boston: American Unitarian Association. p. 599ff., also published as Channing, William Ellery (1838). A discourse delivered in Boston, November 12, 1837: Being a tribute to the memory of Reverend Noah Worcester, D.D. London: John Green.
- Dennis Davidson, "Noah Worcester", in the Dictionary of Unitarian and Universalist Biography.
- Samuel Atkins Eliot, Noah Worcester in Heralds of a Liberal Faith, vol. 2, 1901.
- William P. Marchione, Noah Worcester: Brighton's Apostle of Peace, on the Brighton Allston Historical Society website.
- "Worcester, Noah", in The New American Cyclopedia, George Ripley and Charles Dana (eds.), Vol. XVI, New York: 1863. (pp. 554 – 555).
