= Samuel Worcester (theologian) =

American theologian (1770–1821)

Samuel Worcester (1 November 1770, in Hollis, New Hampshire – 7 June 1821, in Brainerd, Tennessee) was a United States clergyman noted for his participation in a controversy over Unitarianism.

== Biography ==
Against his father's wishes, he decided to educate himself for a profession rather than become a farmer. After attending and then teaching in local schools, he went to New Ipswitch Academy, and then entered Dartmouth College, where he graduated in 1795. He was licensed to preach in 1796.

From 1797 until 1802, he was pastor of the Congregational Church in Fitchburg, Massachusetts. Worcester subscribed to Hopkinsian Calvinism, and his views brought him into conflict with some in his parish who favored Universalism and others of liberal views. He was finally forced to resign from his charge.

He became pastor of the Tabernacle Church, Salem, in 1803, which charge he held until his death. He declined the professorship of theology in Dartmouth in 1804, and became corresponding secretary of the American Board of Commissioners for Foreign Missions in 1810. He became occupied enough with his missionary work, that in 1819 an associate pastor was appointed at the Tabernacle Church.

In 1815, he engaged in a noted controversy on Unitarianism with William E. Channing. A review, attributed to Jeremiah Evarts, had been published in The Panoplist in June 1815 of a pamphlet on American Unitarianism (American Unitarianism; or a Brief History of the Progress and Present State of the Unitarian Churches of America). Channing objected to the way Unitarians in the United States were portrayed in the review, Worcester replied to this objection, and an exchange of pamphlets followed.

At the time of his death, Worcester was traveling for the benefit of his health.

== Publications ==
- Discourses on the Covenant with Abraham (Salem, 1805)
- Three Letters to the Rev. William E. Channing on Unitarianism (Boston, 1815)
- Watts's Entire and Select Hymns (1818)

He also published single sermons and pamphlets, and reviews and essays in religious periodicals. After his death, a collection of his sermons was published (1823).

== Family ==
Samuel's brother Noah was a pioneer of the peace movement in the United States. Another brother Thomas (1768–1831) was also a clergyman. Samuel's son Samuel Melancthon Worcester (4 September 1801, Fitchburg, Massachusetts - 16 August 1866, Boston) graduated from Harvard in 1822, studied for a year at Andover, was a tutor in Amherst from 1823 to 1825, and professor of rhetoric and oratory there from 1825 to 1834. He was pastor of the Tabernacle Church, Salem, from 1834 to 1860, when impaired health caused him to resign. He was a member of the Massachusetts Senate and House of Representatives. He published Essays on Slavery, by Vigorinus (1826), The Memorial of the Old and New Tabernacle (Boston, 1855), Life and Labors of Rev. Samuel Worcester (2 vols., Boston, 1852), and single sermons and discourses, and articles in religious periodicals.
