= List of Fireball (dinghy) championships =

This is a list of Fireball sailboat championships.

== Continental Championships ==
Year	Continent	Venue	Boat	Helm and Crew	Country
1969	European	Belgium	4161	Peter Bateman & Julian Brooke-Houghton	United Kingdom
1970	European	Event Not Held			
1971	European	Sweden	6396	A Batzill & R Batzill	West Germany
1972	European	West Germany	7175	Jean-Claude Vuithier & Pierre Walt	Switzerland
1973	European	Italy	Fireball 8091	Phillippe Durr & Yvan Pochon	Switzerland
1974	European	Switzerland	9238	Alistair Locke & N Robinson	United Kingdom
1975	European	United Kingdom	7429	Philippe Gault & Patrice Gault	France
1976	European	Sweden	9961	Lawrie Smith & Paul Withers	United Kingdom
1977	European	West Germany	11059	Roger Tushingham & Alistair Locke	United Kingdom
1978	European	France	11609	Kim Slater & Nick Read-Wilson	United Kingdom
1979	European	Sweden	12063	David Bain & Stuart Angus	United Kingdom
1980	European	United Kingdom	12812	Eddie Warden-Owen & Ossie Stewart	United Kingdom
1981	European	Italy	12895	Nigel Buckley & Steve Birbeck	United Kingdom
1982	European	Ireland	12923	Tony Wetherell & Steve Goacher	United Kingdom
1983	European	France	12718	Colin McKinnon & Doug Peniston	United Kingdom
1984	European	United Kingdom	13317	Tim Rush & Angus Hemmings	United Kingdom
1985	European	Guernsey	13460	Ian Fryett & Giles Fryett	United Kingdom
1986	European	Sweden	13668	Andy Rowland & Mark Hazelwood	United Kingdom
1987	European	France	13845 "Boy Racer"	Ian Pinnell & Daniel Cripps	United Kingdom
1988	European	Italy	14016	Ian Pinnell & Daniel Cripps	United Kingdom
1989	European	Belgium	14016	Ian Pinnell & Jarrod Simpson	United Kingdom
1990	European	Switzerland	14169	Jeremy Hartley & Chris Miles	United Kingdom
1991	European	Czechoslovakia	14267	Ian Pinnell & Daniel Cripps	United Kingdom
1992	European	Italy	14334	Jean-Charles Scale & Bertrand Loyal	France
1993	European	Belgium	14376	Erich Moser & Ruedi Moser	Switzerland
1994	European	France	14376	Erich Moser & Ruedi Moser	Switzerland
1995	European	Ireland	14378	John Lavery & David O'Brien	Ireland
1996	European	Switzerland	Fireball 14540	Erich Moser & Ruedi Moser	Switzerland
1997	European	United Kingdom	14579 "Kojak's Roll-Neck"	Colin Goodman & Jim Turner	United Kingdom
1998	European	Czech Republic	14552	Thomas Musil & Roman Racek	Czech Republic
1999	European	France	14701	Ian Pinnell & M Flint	United Kingdom
2000	European	Ireland	14685 "Last Man's Batter"	Steve Morrison & Richard Wagstaff	United Kingdom
2001	European	Italy	14685 "Last Man's Batter"	Steve Morrison & Liam Murray	United Kingdom
2002	European	Italy	14799	Erich Moser & Ruedi Moser	Switzerland
2003	European	United Kingdom	14801	Andy Smith & James Meldrum	United Kingdom
2004	European	Slovenia	14879 "Aloha Malina"	Thomas Musil & Jan Stantejsky	Czech Republic
2005	European	United Kingdom	14908 "4 walls 4 sail"	David Edwards & Dan Newman	United Kingdom
2006	European	France	14895 "Gul"	Andy Smith & Jonny Mildred	United Kingdom
2007	European	Event Not Held			
2008	European	Belgium	14948	Tom Jeffcoate & David Hynes	United Kingdom
2009	European	France	15020	Vince Horey & Rob Gardner	United Kingdom
2010	European	Czech Republic	15041	Tom Gillard & Sam Brearey	United Kingdom
2011	European	Event Not Held			
2012	European	Italy	Fireball 15084	Matt Burge & Richard Wagstaff	United Kingdom
2013	European	Slovenia	15093	Matt Burge & Richard Wagstaff	United Kingdom
2014	European	Shetland Islands	15081	Tom Gillard & Richard Anderton	United Kingdom
2015	European	Event Not Held			
2016	European	taly	14799	Claude Mermod & Ruedi Moser	Switzerland
2017	European	United Kingdom	15123	Matt Burge & Dan Schieber	United Kingdom
2018	European	Event Not Held			
2019	European	Czech Republic	14973	Alois Verkest & Ludovic Collin	France
