= Isaac R. Moores =

American politician

Member of the Oregon Territorial Legislature
- In office 1855–1856
- Constituency: Lane County

Delegate to the Oregon Constitutional Convention
- In office 1857
- Constituency: Lane County

Personal details
- Born: March 23, 1796 Madison County, Kentucky
- Died: April 15, 1861 (aged 65) Eugene, Oregon
- Party: Democrat
- Spouse: Jane Alexander

Col. Isaac R. Moores (March 23, 1796– April 15, 1861) was an American soldier and politician in Illinois and Oregon. A native of Kentucky, he would serve in the Seminole War and the Black Hawk War before migrating to the Oregon Territory. In Oregon, Moores served in the Territorial Legislature and at the Oregon Constitutional Convention. His son, Isaac R. Moores, Jr. would become Speaker of the Oregon House of Representatives.

== Early years ==
Isaac Moores was born in Madison County, Kentucky, on March 23, 1796. His father, Henry, was a veteran of the American Revolutionary War. Moores grew up in the American South and in 1814 he enlisted in the United States Army to fight in the Seminole War. In 1818, he served under future president Andrew Jackson in the Seminole War, fighting two campaigns.

In 1818, he married Jane Alexander (December 27, 1793 – January 28, 1868) in Tennessee. They would live for a time in Alabama before moving north to Illinois. Moores was a friend of Sam Houston and the later attempted to recruit Moores for settlement in Texas. The Moores family would settle in Danville, Illinois, in 1824. During the Black Hawk War in 1831 he was selected as a colonel and led the 4th regiment of the Illinois Volunteers. Moores also formed a company of soldiers to serve in the Mexican American War, but never enlisted as the state had reached its quota for soldiers.

== Oregon ==
Isaac Moores and his family left Danville in March 1852 and traveled the Oregon Trail to the Oregon Territory in a wagon train of 70 wagons. The family arrived in Portland in November 1852. Col. Moores moved to the southern end of the Willamette Valley, settling in Lane County. There he acquired a farm totaling 1,710 acres (6.9 km^{2}).

In 1855, Moores was elected to represent Lane County as a Democrat in the Oregon Territory House of Representatives. Moores was elected as a delegate to the Oregon Constitutional Convention in 1857. Held in Salem, the convention created a constitution as Oregon prepared to become a state. Moores represented Lane County again as a Democrat, serving on the military affairs committee.

== Later years and family ==
Opposed to slavery, he would become a Republican when that party organized. The Republican Party nominated him for the Oregon State Senate in 1860, but he lost the election. Moores' children were John H. (June 26, 1821 – December 16, 1880), Martha A. (February 1, 1824 – March 23, 1847), Mary Matilda (January 21, 1826 – April 20, 1864), Charles W. (November 2, 1828 – June 10, 1864), and Isaac Ross Moores (February 14, 1831 – July 25, 1884). Isaac R. Moores, Sr. died in Eugene on April 15, 1861, at the age of 65 and was buried in the Salem Pioneer Cemetery.
