= Strip-built =

Method of boat building using planks glued end to end

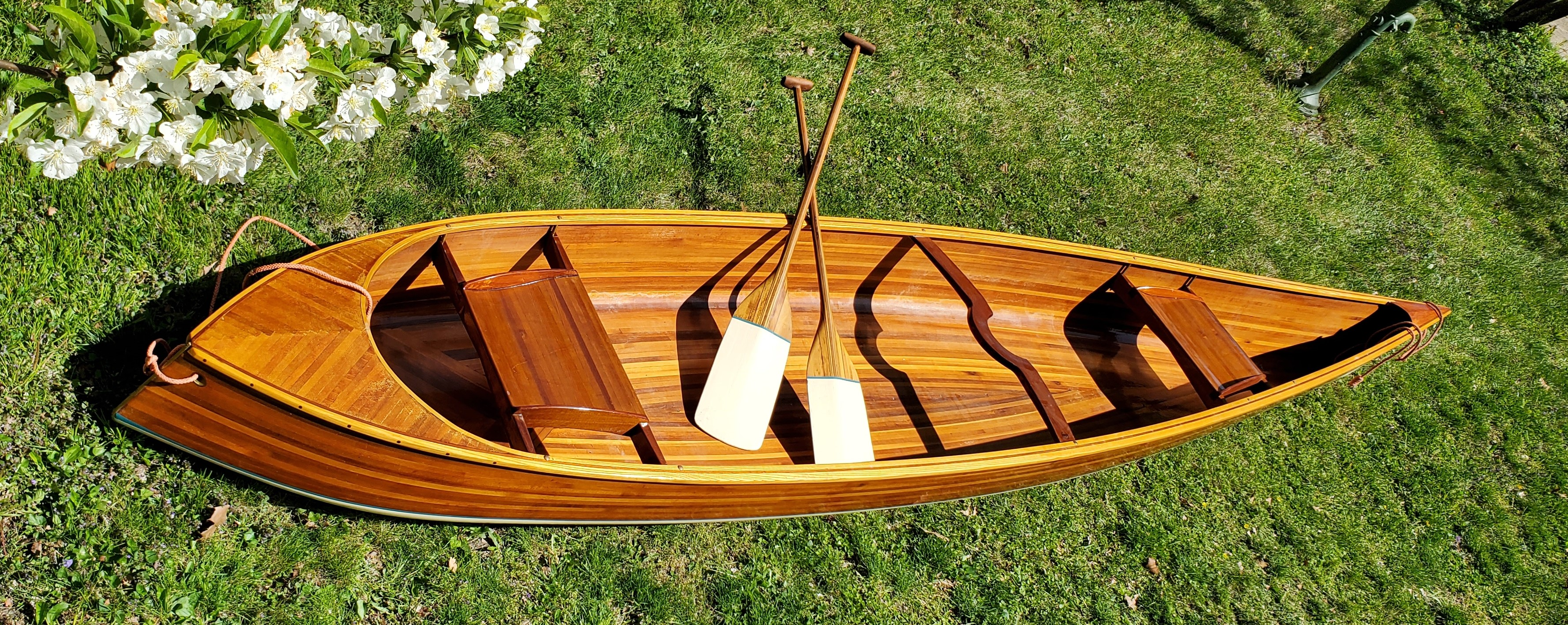
Wood strip-built canoe

Strip-built, or "strip-plank epoxy", is a method of boat building. Also known as cold molding, the strip-built method is commonly used for canoes and kayaks, but also suitable for larger boats. The process involves securing narrow, flexible strips of wood edge-to-edge around temporary formers. The temporary formers are usually created via a process called "lofting" whereby a set of tables is used to generate the shapes of the formers. The strips are glued edge-to-edge with epoxy. It is effectively a modern form of carvel which needs no caulking and which is both stiffer and more watertight. In a small boat, there will be just one layer of strip-planking, but larger vessels may have two or three layers which, (being a pre-shaped marine ply), forms a light, strong, and torsionally stiff monococque.

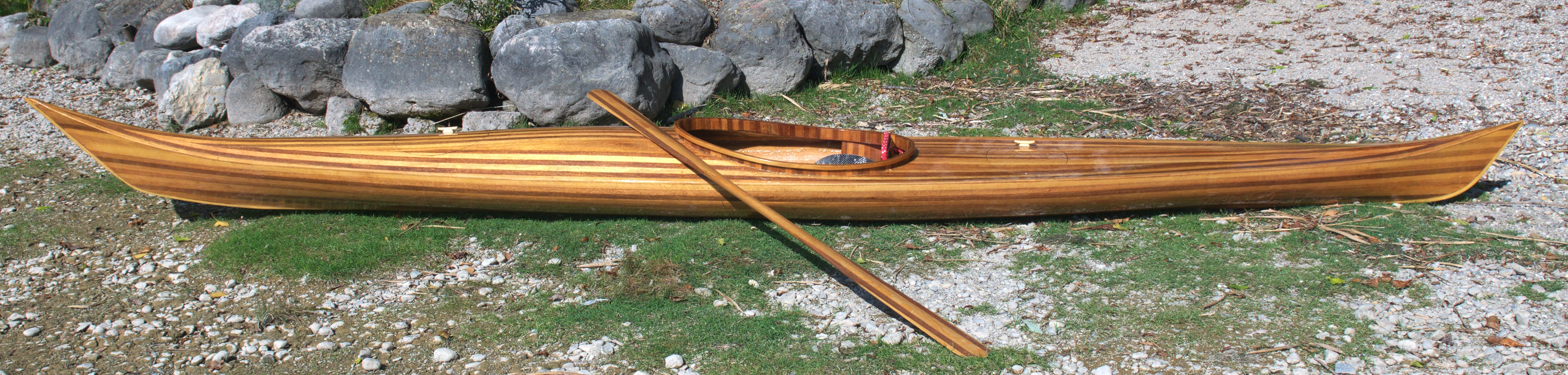
Wood strip-built Kayak

A modern development of this construction procedure is "radius chine plywood", a method devised by yacht designer Dudley Dix which gives a fair hull that is both light and stiff. Dix uses this boat-building method for most of his designs.

== Smaller boats ==
These are the most popular among boatbuilders. Some professional builders also offer both kits and finished boats. The canoes are constructed by gluing together 1/4" x 3/4" strips of wood over a building jig consisting of station molds that define the shape of the hull. The forms are cut as a series of cross-sections of the final design and set up along a "strongback" or another solid base. The strips are shaped with bead and cove router bits. Stripping begins at the sheer line and finishes with "the football", a pattern of planks at the bottom of the boat. The strips are edge-glued to each other, being held in place with nails, staples, or simply clamped to the forms. Once the strips are glued together, and the staples/nails removed, the inside and outside are sanded fair. Fiberglass and epoxy are applied to the canoe inside and out. The fiberglass covering is transparent, waterproof, and allowing the wood strips to be seen. The strips are usually cedar but can be any type of wood. Contrasting woods are sometimes used as accent strips. The last steps in construction is to install the seats, thwarts, and gunwales. Finally, a coat of marine-grade polyurethane is applied to protect the wood and epoxy from ultraviolet light.

In the 1950s, this process for building canoes and kayaks was adapted from ship/boat building techniques, and refined by a group of Minnesota canoe racers, primarily: Eugene Jensen, Irwin C.(Buzzy) Peterson, and Karl Ketter.

Cedar-strip canoe hull fabrication in process

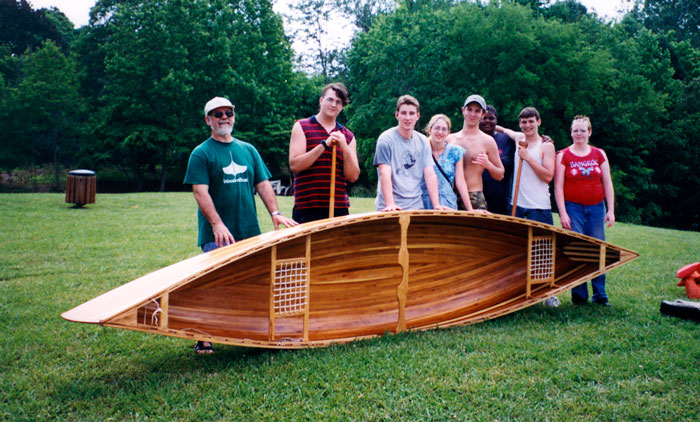
High school boat-building class

== Larger boats ==
Strip-plank epoxy planking may be found on large yachts such as the Brady 45 catamaran, a plans-built Australian design with Indonesian cedar planking. For a large catamaran, this construction method produces a tough hull with an inherent buoyancy. Once the strip-plank monocoque is completed, it is covered inside and out with glass fiber matting and epoxy resin. Working primarily with wood is much more pleasant for the builder than building exclusively with fiberglass, which can cause irritation and respiratory problems. Also, for a one-off constructor, it makes little sense to build a female mold; it is simpler and cheaper to manufacture a wooden jig that may be discarded afterward.

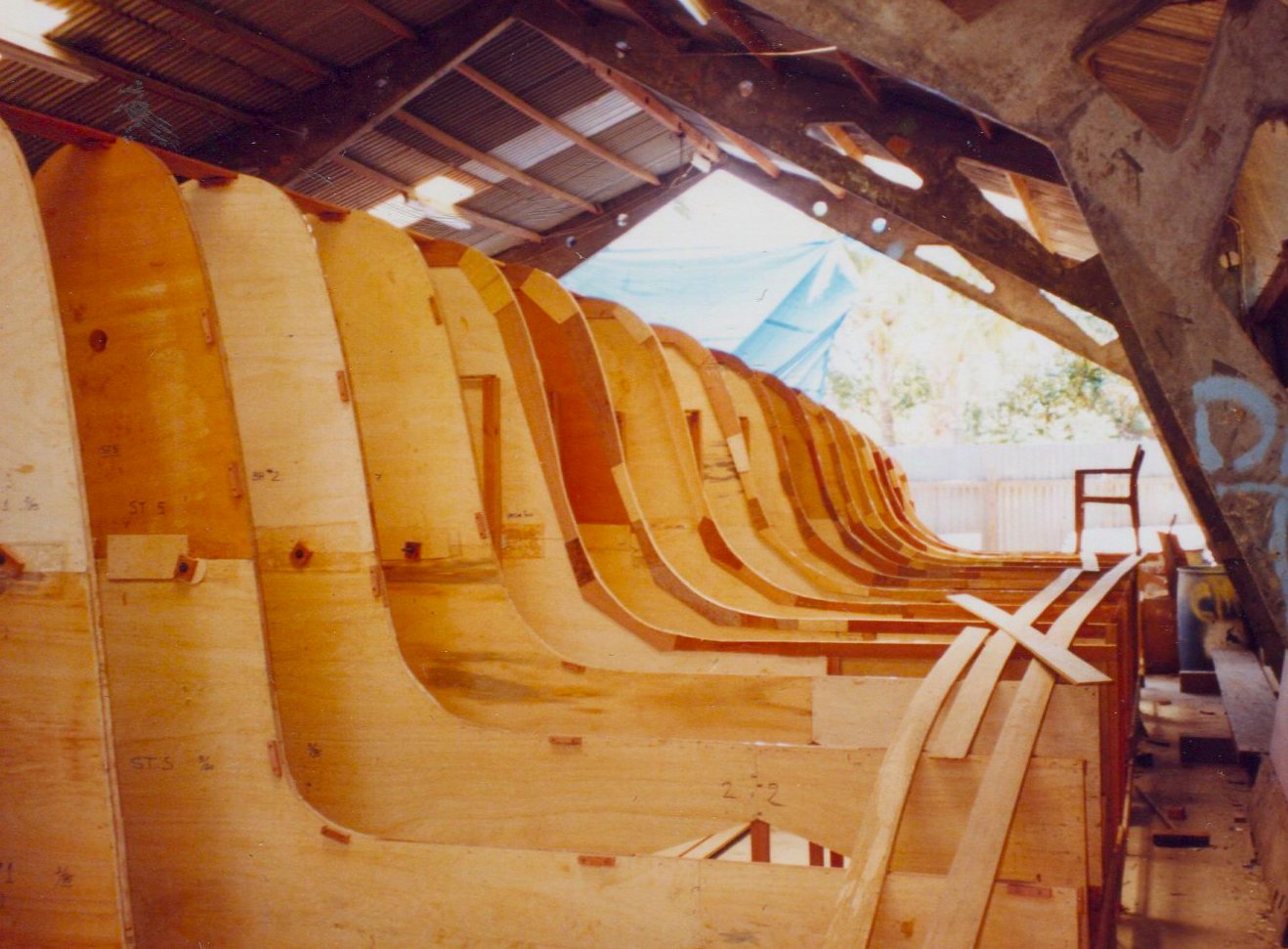
Plywood formers awaiting the application of strip planks

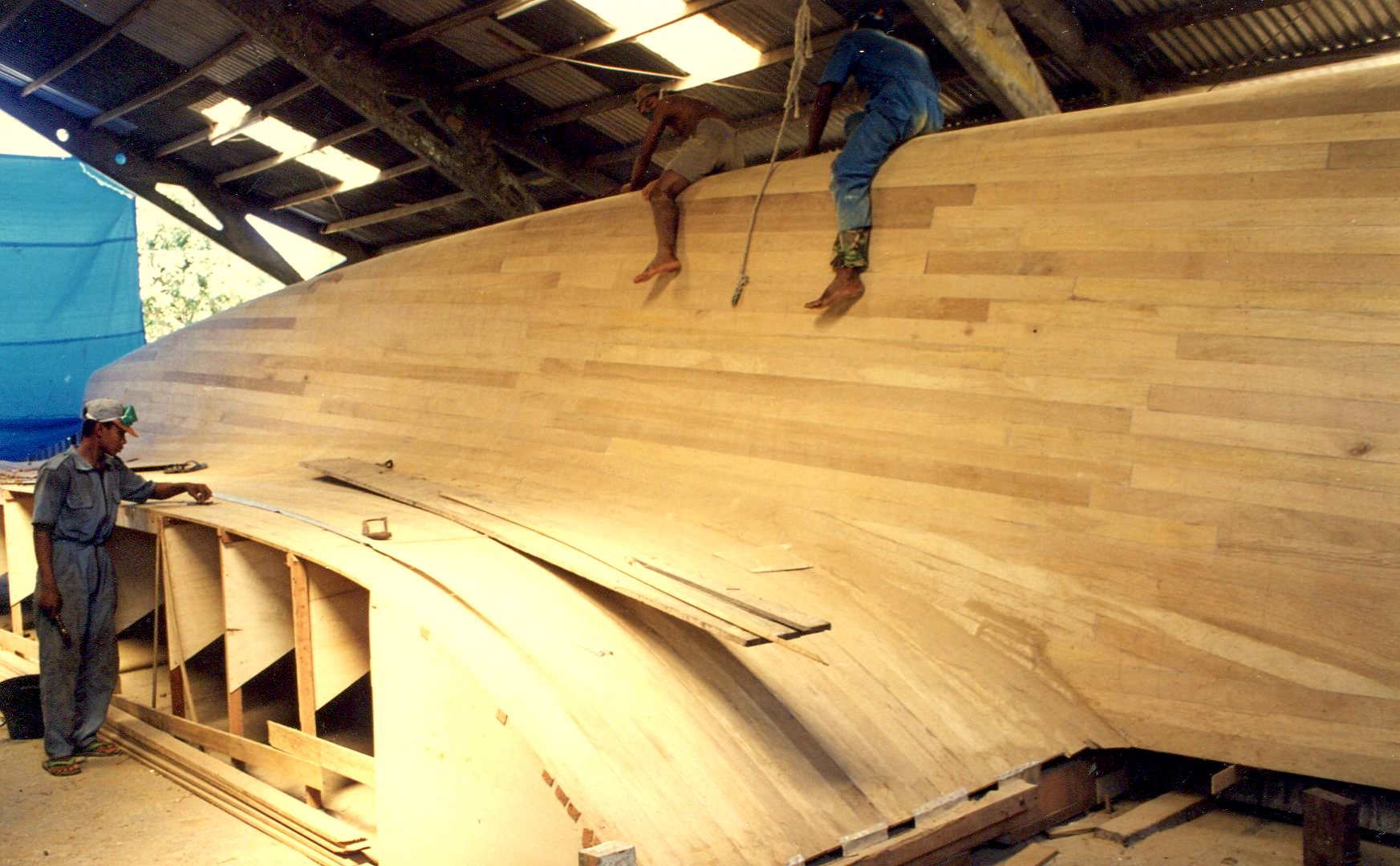
Brady 45' strip-built catamaran under construction

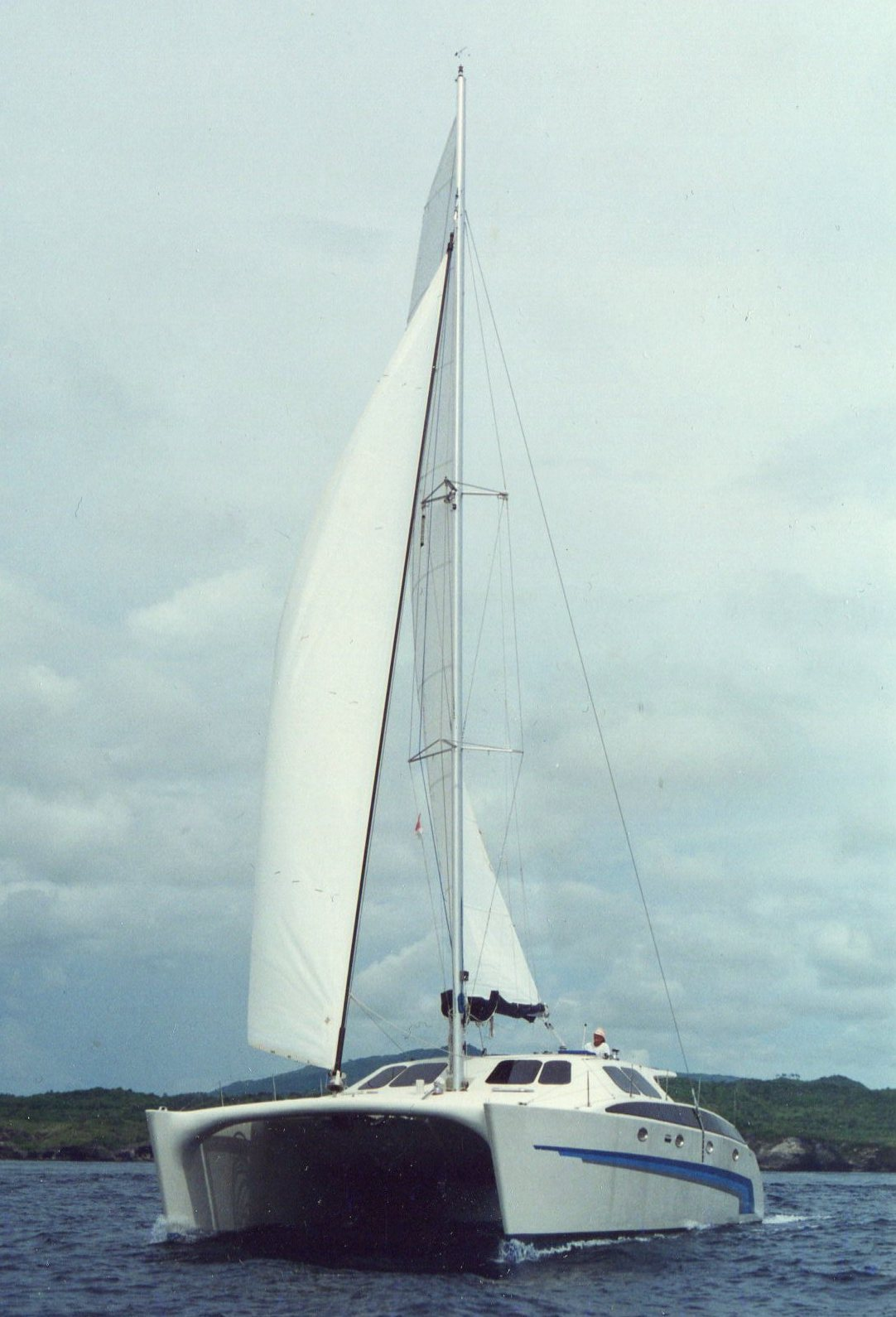
Completed Brady 45' with grp/epoxy coating

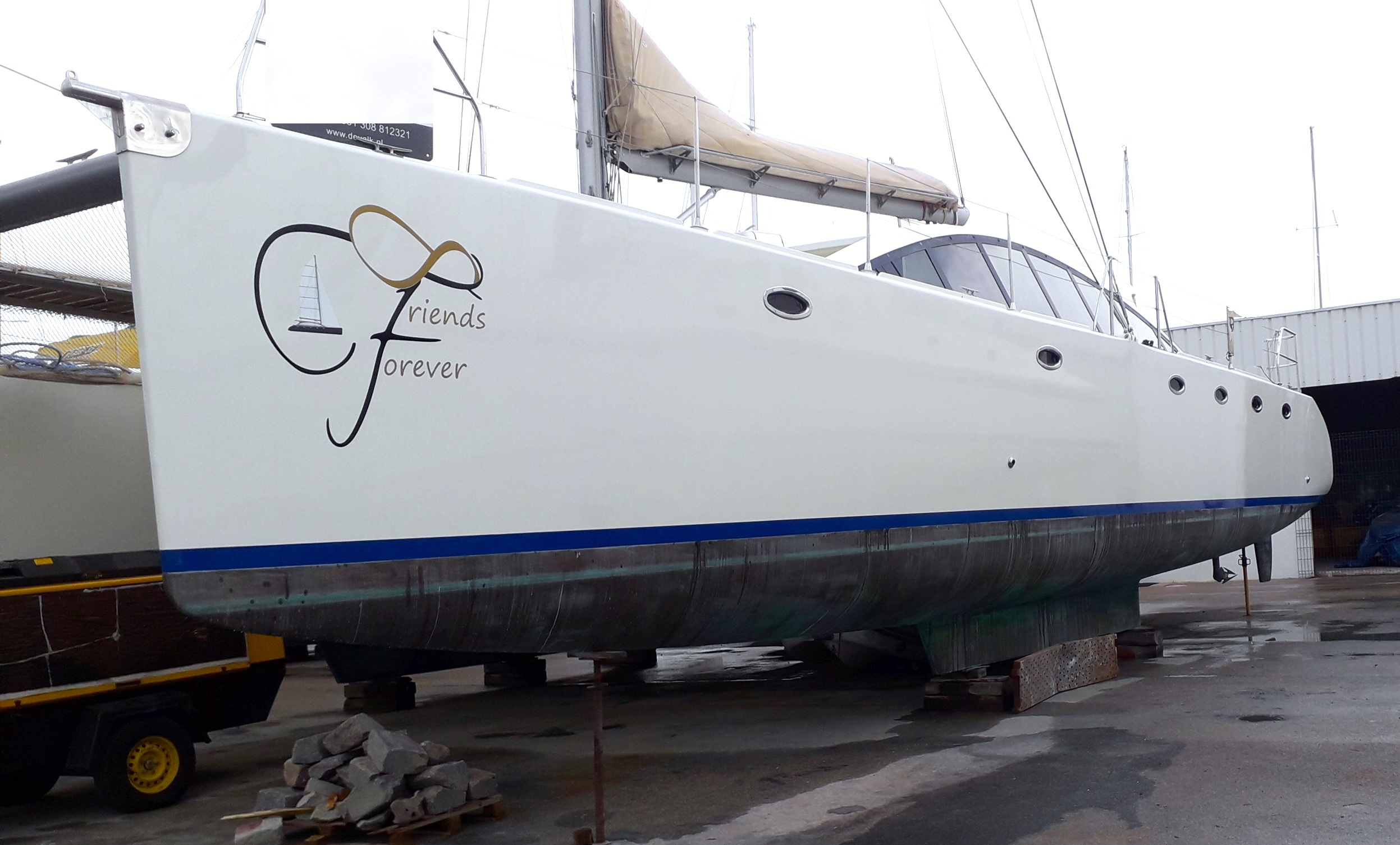
DH550 55' catamaran, using radius-chine plywood
