= Isaac R. Moores Jr. =

American politician

4th Speaker of the Oregon House of Representatives
- In office 1864–1865
- Preceded by: Joel Palmer
- Succeeded by: Francis A. Chenoweth

Member of the Oregon House of Representatives
- In office 1862–1865
- Constituency: Marion County

Personal details
- Born: February 14, 1831 Danville, Illinois
- Died: July 25, 1884 (aged 53) Portland, Oregon
- Party: Republican
- Spouse: Ellen R. Lamon

Isaac Ross Moores Jr. (February 14, 1831 – July 25, 1884) was an American businessman and politician in the state of Oregon. The son of Isaac R. Moores, he was born in Illinois and moved to the Oregon Territory in 1852. In Oregon, he would serve in the Oregon House of Representatives, including as Speaker of that body.

== Early life ==
Isaac Moores Jr. was born in Danville, Illinois, on February 14, 1831. His parents were Isaac senior and the former Jane Alexander. Siblings included John H. (June 26, 1821 – December 16, 1880), Martha A. (February 1, 1824 – March 23, 1847), Mary Matilda (January 21, 1826 – April 20, 1864), and Charles W. (November 2, 1828 – June 10, 1864). Isaac junior was educated in the local schools of Illinois before leaving for the gold fields of California in 1850. He returned to Illinois in 1852 after failing to gain a fortune.

== Oregon ==
In 1852, the Moores family traveled the Oregon Trail to the Oregon Territory, arriving in Portland in November. Isaac settled in Yamhill County where he worked as a surveyor. In October 1854, he moved to capitol, Salem. In Salem, he worked as a clerk for J. N. McDonald’s mercantile store before buying it out in 1856 with his brother John. Moores was appointed as postmaster for Salem on April 14, 1855, and held the position until October 1858. On September 2, 1856, he married Ellen R. Lamon and they would have seven children. In 1861, with the outbreak of the American Civil War he joined the Oregon Volunteer Militia. Moores was selected as colonel of the second regiment, but the militia remained in Oregon and never saw action.

In 1862, he was elected to the Oregon House of Representatives. Moores served as a Republican representing Marion County. At the next session of the legislature in 1864 he served again, and was elected as Speaker of the House. He also served as Speaker during the 1865 special session of the legislature. His brother John would later serve in the Oregon State Senate and as mayor of Salem.

== Later life ==
In 1866, he sold out his mercantile business and was appointed by Governor George Lemuel Woods as clerk to the State Board of Land Commissioners. The following year he was one of the incorporators of the Oregon Central Railroad, and served as president of the railroad for a time. Moores left the State Board in 1870 and was appointed as land commissioner to the Oregon & California Railroad, remaining in that position until his death. He was a member of the Masons, Odd Fellows, and on the Common Council of Salem. Isaac Ross Moores died of apoplexy in Portland on July 25, 1884, at the age of 53. He was buried at the Salem Pioneer Cemetery where his father was buried.
