= Price reporting agency =

Publishers that assess commodity prices

A price reporting agency (PRA) is a privately owned publisher and information provider that reports commodity prices in physical and derivative commodity markets in order to provide an informed assessment of commodity price levels at distinct points in time. PRAs may also provide services such as news, analysis, consulting, data analytics, and conferencing.

There are over 100 price reporting agencies, of which the largest are S&P Global Energy, Argus Media, OPIS (part of Dow Jones), ICIS (part of RELX), and FastMarkets.

== Background ==
Price reporting agencies assess the fair price of commodities and report these values to a wider audience, who then use those assessments for information purposes or as the basis for physical or financial transactions. Most PRAs were founded by individuals who identified a need for information after encountering a lack of transparency in a commodity market with which they were intimately familiar. The first PRAs often started as mailed or faxed newssheets prepared by small teams of specialist commodity journalists, providing news about market developments and company activities as well as analysis of price trends.

The oldest PRA is The Public Ledger, which was founded in 1760 and became specialized in agricultural commodity markets. The Public Ledger was merged with IEG Vu in 2017.

== Business model ==
Virtually all PRAs employ a subscription business model, selling data and information to customers on a renewable annual basis. PRAs have sought to diversify their revenue streams by developing complementary business lines. In addition to supplying data, PRAs also provide news and analysis to subscribers, and most have conferencing businesses. Many firms also have or are developing consultancy businesses and advanced data analytics capacities.

The larger PRAs enjoy high operating margins, and recent transactions have valued PRAs highly. Ownership stakes in pricing businesses are trading at a significant premium to traditional media or publishing businesses, as investors value their record of growth and steady income streams from subscription revenue. PRAs compete with one another to publish the most accurate and relevant assessment of a commodity's price.

A notable example of industry consolidation is S&P Global Platts' acquisition of PIRA Energy Group in 2016, which expanded its analytical capabilities in global energy markets.

== Regulation ==
PRAs have traditionally considered themselves to be media firms or publishers rather than providers of financial data. As such, only in recent years have regulators begun to examine the work of PRAs and how their assessment processes shape market behaviour and, ultimately, affect consumer prices.

The higher profile that has followed increasing government scrutiny is a new phenomenon for PRAs. Other benchmarks, such as those provided by ratings agencies or the formation of benchmarks like LIBOR, the London Gold and Silver Fixes, and foreign exchange spot rates, have received significantly more attention, particularly since the 2008 financial crisis.

PRAs have generally stood up well to investigations into their procedures and practices. To date, there have not been any instances where a PRA has been shown to have deliberately published a false or misleading price. Any bad behaviour has generally come from market participants reporting information to PRAs, such as reporting fake trades or providing incorrect information. There have also been cases where market participants have attempted to manipulate a market assessed by a PRA. For example, the European Commission has investigated whether some participants colluded to prevent certain companies from participating in a price-reporting mechanism, but there is no evidence that PRAs have colluded with market abuse or behaved improperly.
