= Yngling World Championship =

International sailing regatta

The Yngling World Championship is international sailing regatta in the Yngling (keelboat) class organized by the host club on behalf of International Yngling Class Association and recognized by the World Sailing.

The Yngling was used in the 2004 and 2008 Olympic Games for the female keelboat discipline alongside the star as the male discipline. So from 2001 to 2008 the class hosted a female gender specific separate World Championship event. When this event was held in partnership with the open world championships the "open gender" category effectively became "male and mixed gender crews".

== Editions – Female ==
Edition			Host				Boats	Sailors			Ref.
Ed.	Date	Year	Club	Location	Nation	Notes	Boats	Comp.	Nats	Cont.	Ref.
1	19-26 Jul	2002	Regattaverein Brunnen	Lake Lucerne	Switzerland	part of the Open Worlds	44	132	16	3	
2	11-24 Sep	2003		Cádiz	Spain	part of Combined Olympic Worlds	41	123	18	3	
3	7-15 May	2004		Santander	Spain	stand alone event	37	111	19	5	
4	15-23 Jul	2005	Union Yacht Club Mondsee	Lake Mondsee	Austria	Part of the Open Worlds	34	102	20	6	
5	30Jun -8Jul	2006	Societe des Regates Rochelaises	La Rochelle	France	Part of the Open Worlds	37	111	19	5	
6	28Jun -13Jul	2007	Clube Naval de Cascais	Cascais	Portugal	part of Combined Olympic Worlds	35	105	21	6	
7	8-15 Feb	2008	US Sailing Miami	Miami	United States	Stand alone event	28	84	19	5	

== Editions – Open ==
Edition			Host			Sailors			Boats				Ref.
Ed.	Date	Year	Host club	Location	Nat.	Comp.	Nats	Cont.	No.	Male	Fem.	Mix	Ref.
1	22-28 July	1979	Christianssands Sjømandsforening	Kristiansand	Norway		8	2	57				
2	11-19 July	1980		Attersee (lake)	Austria		8	2	77				
3	6-12 July	1981	Royal Norwegian Yacht Club	Hankø	Norway		9	3	54				
4	15-20 November	1982		Sarasota	United States		8	3	30				
5	8-16 July	1983	Sundby Sejlforening	Copenhagen	Denmark		8	3	74				
6	21-28 July	1984		Versoix	Switzerland		8	2	64				
7	6-13 July	1985	Asker Seilforening	Oslo	Norway		6	2	44				
8	19-26 July	1986		Muiden	Netherlands		8	3	70				
9	11-19 July	1987		Attersee (lake)	Austria		8	2	57				
10	15-23 July	1988		Rungsted	Denmark		8	3	58				
11	7-15 July	1989	Tønsberg Seilforening	Tønsberg	Norway		7	2	56				
12	13-21 July	1990		Lac Leman, Geneva	Switzerland		8	2	57				
13	19-27 July	1991		Ijsselmeer, Medemblik	Netherlands		7	2	50				
14	10-18 July	1992	Union Yacht Club Traunsee	Gmünden	Austria	153	7	2	51				
15	15-24 July	1993	Hellerup Sejlklub	Copenhagen	Denmark		8	3	57				
16	8-16 July	1994	Moss Seilforening	Moss	Norway		6	2	47				
17	7-15 July	1995		Lac Leman, Versoix	Switzerland		8	2	44				
18	31 Dec to 8 Jan	1995	Royal Sydney Yacht Squadron	Sydney	Australia	117	9	3	39				
19	20-27 July	1997	Koninklijke Watersportvereniging Sneek	Stavoren	Netherlands		9	3	63				
20	12-17 July	1998		Wolfgansee, St. Gilgen	Austria	213	9	3	71				
21	-	1999		Landskrona	Sweden		9	3	62				
22	21-29 July	2000		Kaløvig, Aarhus	Denmark	225	9	3	75				
23	15-21 July	2001	Sakonnet Yacht Club	Newport, Rhode Island	United States		12	3	45				
24	19-26 July	2002	Regattaverein Brunnen	Lake Lucerne, Brunnen	Switzerland	126	9	3	42				
25	18-25 July	2003	Warnemünder Segel Club	Rostock, Warnemünde	Germany	255	20	3	85				
26	1-6 Jan	2004		Sydney	Australia		10	2	36				
27	15-23 July	2005	Union Yacht Club Mondsee	Lake Mondsee	Austria	177	8	3	59				
28	30 June to 8 July	2006	Societe des Regates Rochelaises	La Rochelle	France	126	7	3	42				
29	20-28 July	2007		Medemblik	Netherlands	195	11	4	65				
30	6-12 July	2008		Skovshoved	Denmark	168	8	3	56				
31	31 July to 8 Aug	2009	Segelsällskapet Kaparen	Kalmar	Sweden	102	7	3	34				
32	16-24 July	2010	Royal Yach Club Sneek	Lelystad	Netherlands	156	11	3	52				
32	8-16 July	2011	Yacht Club Attersee	Attersee (lake)	Austria	177	8	2	59				
33	2-8 Jan	2012	Royal Sydney Yacht Squadron	Sydney	Australia	126	9	2	42				
34	18-27 July	2013	Regattaverein Brunnen RVB	Brunnen	Switzerland	156	10	3	52				
35	18-26 July	2014		Travemünde	Germany	120	8	2	40				
36	17-24 July	2015	Askøy Seilforening	Askøy	Norway	108	8	3	36				
37	15-22 July	2016	Union-Yacht-Club Wolfgangsee	St. Gilgen	Austria	178	7	3	59				
38	16-22 July	2017	Koninklijke Watersportvereniging Sneek	Sneek	Netherlands	132	8	3	44				
39	8-14 July	2018	Fraglia Vela Riva	Lake Garda	Italy	132	8	3	44				
40	26 July to 2 Aug	2019		Sheboygan, Wisconsin	United States	66	4	2	22				
N/A	20-25 July	2020		Müggelsee	Germany	CANCELLED DUE TO COVID							
41	24-31 July	2021		Müggelsee	Germany	153	11	3	51				
N/A	-	2022	Yacht Club Jadro Koper		Slovenia	CANCELLED							
42	24-31 July	2022	Travemünde Week	Travemünde	Netherlands	93	7	2	31				
43	22-29 July	2023	Sundby Sejlforening	Copenhagen	Denmark	144	8	2	48				
44	18-25 May	2024	Union Yacht Club Traunsee	Gmunden	Austria	144	7	1	48				
45	18-25 July	2025	Royal Netherlands Yachting Union	Oosterschelde	Netherlands	156	8	1	52				
46	1-8 Aug	2026	Askøy Seilforening	Askøy	Norway	159	9	3	53				
47	28 Aug -3 Sep	2027	Regattaverein Brunnen	Brunnen	Switzerland								
48	TBD	2028	Hellerup Sejlklub	Copenhagen	Denmark								
49	28 July -4 Aug	2029	Tønsberg Seilforening	Tønsberg	Norway								

== Multiple World champions ==
Table based on the data below includes up to the 2026 World Championship (*) full results for every year are not available so these are minimums attendances

Ranking	Sailor	Gold	Silver	Bronze	Total	No. Entries (*)
1	Maarten Jamin (NED)	5	3	2	10	18
2	Jaap Smolders (NED)	4	3	2	9	14
3	Tom Otte (NED)	3	6	1	10	12
4	Hidde-Jan Haven (NED)	3	1	1	5	8
4	Don Van Arem (NED)	3	1	1	5	9
4	Soeren Pehrsson (DEN)	3	1	1	5	5
7	Floortje De Vries (NED)	3	1	0	4	6
8	Mads Christensen (DEN)	3	0	1	4	9
8	Anders Fisker (DEN)	3	0	1	4	7
10	Auke Van Der Werf (NED)	3	0	0	3	6
11	Mark Haven (NED)	2	2	0	4	6
11	Menno Berens (NED)	2	2	0	4	6
13	Yska Minks (NED)	2	1	1	4	10
13	Wouter Toornstra (NED)	2	1	0	3	9
15	Cristel Pessers (NED)	2	0	2	4	10
16	Terje Wang (NOR)	2	0	1	3	3
16	John Ingalls (USA)	2	0	1	3	12
16	Sñren Hñgild (DEN)	2	0	1	3	3
16	Rudolf Mayr (AUT)	2	0	1	3	15
20	Niels Chr. Andersen (DEN)	2	0	2	4	4
21	Patrick Sebbelov (DEN)	2	0	1	3	3
22	Espen Stokkeland (NOR)	2	0	0	2	2
22	Monica Azon (ESP)	2	0	0	2	8
22	Neville Wittey (AUS)	2	0	0	2	3
22	Sarah Ayton (GBR)	2	0	0	2	8
22	Sarah Gosling (GBR)	2	0	0	2	6
22	Sandra Azon (ESP)	2	0	0	2	5
22	Pippa Wilson (GBR)	2	0	0	2	2

== Medalists – Open Gender Worlds ==
Year	Gold	Silver	Bronze
1979	Norway N333; Terje Wang; Marius Nissen Lie; Finn Hanssen	Denmark D36; Torsten Rasmussen; Peter Gerstoft; Flemming T. Christensen	Denmark D111; Jørgen Ring; Niels Chr. Andersen; Michael Bang
1980	Austria OE171; Harald Fereberger; Herbert Spitzbart; Edwin Zelder	Norway N350; Kalle Nergaard; Erik Schwabe; Jan Monrad Hansen	Norway N333; Terje Wang; M. Nissen-Lie; Knut Forsberg
1981	Norway N333; Terje Wang; H. Nissen-Lie; Odd Godager	Denmark D36; C T Christensen	Norway N51; Dag Usterud; Stein Lund Halvorsen; Jan Helge Eriksen
1982	Norway N378; J Pettersen; Johansen; Selander	Norway N111; Per Nyhus; Per Nyhus; Øivind Nyhus	Norway N315; Hans Landsvaerk; Erling Landsverk; Tom Erik Ellingsen
1983	Denmark D4; J Ranløv; P Rossing; J Hemmingsen	Denmark D43; Søren Pehrsson; P Midtgaard; N Lassen	Denmark D129; T Palm; T Rasmussen; M Bank
1984	Denmark D43; Søren Pehrsson; P Midtgaard; N Lassen	Denmark D129; Thomasen; Bang; Bang	Norway N217; Ole Andreas Schoyen; Halvor Schoyen; Martin Danielsen
1985	Denmark D28; Theis Palm; Løppenthin; Sebbelo	Norway N355; Kalle Nergaard; Kristian Nergaard; Bjørn Bjordal	NorwayN320; Harald Amundsen; Marius Amundsen; Jørn Pettersen
1986	Denmark D136; Søren Pehrsson; Niels Chr. Andersen; Patrick Sebbelov	Norway N355; Kalle Nergaard; Kristian Nergaard; Bjørn Einar Bjordal	Netherlands H147; F. Verhagen
1987	Denmark D136; Søren Pehrsson; Niels Chr. Andersen; Patrick Sebbelov	Denmark D64; Christian Rasmussen; Dennis Hansen; Brian Frisendahl	Denmark D111; Jørgen Ring; Christian JAcobsen; Philip Christiani
1988	Denmark D136; M Hartvig Andersen; C Pedersen; C Løppenthin	Denmark D132; Sten Peter Mohr; T Olledorf; M Vinter	Denmark D137; Søren Pehrsson; Niels Chr. Andersen; Patrick Sebbelov
1989	Denmark D136; Niels Andersen; Patrick Sebbelov; Jakob Kihl	Denmark D144; Per Lambæk; Søren Lambæk; Jens Pedersen	Denmark D18; Bo Selko; Michael Empacher; Henrik B Nilsen
1990	Norway N389; E. Torgersen; Espen Stokkeland; N. K. Jansen	Denmark D129; C Rasmussen; J Wedelheinen; N Lagersson	Denmark D18; N Andersen; J Kihl; B Frisendahl
1991	Denmark D152; Bo Seiko; Klaus Landsmann; Michael Empacher	Denmark D22; Lars Juul Jørgensen; MAds Vilsback; Allan Dam	Sweden S5; Magnus Johansson; Niclas Holm; Christian Strømblad
1992	Denmark D149; Christian Rasmussen; Reinhold; Hartvig	Denmark D36; Claus Høj Jensen; Gullacksen; Stock-Melchior	Austria OE200; Rudi Mayr; Hiegelsberger; Boustani
1993	Denmark D156; Jesper Bendix; Jacob Grønbæk; Lars Christensen	Denmark D157; Mikkel Hartvig Andersen; Thomas Olsen; Niels Siggard Andersen	Denmark D159; Christian Rasmussen; Morten Reinhold; Thomas Hartvig
1994	Denmark DEN 68; Soren Ebdrup; Allan Dam; Malrs Vilsback	Denmark DEN 164; Jesper Bendix; Jakob Grønbeck; Lars Christensen	Denmark DEN 136; Claus Høj Jensen; Klaus Landsmann; Claus Zastrow
1995	no champion decided only 4 race		
1996 Sydney	Australia AUS 38; Neville Wittey; Joshua Grace; David Edwards	Australia AUS 39; David Lumb; Campell Bethwaite; Mathew Levy	Denmark DEN 131; Bo Andersen; Hovgaard; Løppenthin
1997 Stavoren	Denmark DEN 177; Mads Christensen; Soren Hogild; Anders Fisker	Denmark DEN 136; Claus Høj Jensen; Adam Guhle; C Zastrow	Denmark DEN 149; Lars Gottfrederiksen; Niels Gramkov Johansen; Jakob Lichtenberg
1998 Wolfgangsee	Denmark DEN 177; Mads Christensen; Soren Hogild; Anders Fisker	Norway NOR 400; Arne Dahl; Vidar Andreassen; Espen Andreassen	Netherlands NED 88; Yska Minks; De Vries; Marcel de Jong
1999 Landskrona	Denmark DEN 177; Mads Christensen; Soren Hogild; Anders Fisker	Austria AUT 201; Christoph Skolaut; Georg Skolaut; Wolfgang Riha	Denmark DEN 157; Nicklas Holm; Mattias Thomsen; Anders Rñgeberg
2000 Skødstrup	Austria AUT 1 Rudi Mayr; C. Mayr; N. Pracher	Denmark DEN 149; Lars Gottfredsen; C. Kamp; M. Hans	Denmark DEN 177; Mads Christensen; Soren Høgild; Anders Fisker
2001 Newport	Austria AUT 201; Christoph Skolaut; Georg Skolaut; Wolfgang Riha	United States USA 332; Betsy Alison	United States USA 329; Hannah Swett
2002 Brunnen	Denmark DEN 189; Claus Høj Jensen; Maria Holm; Morten Harmsen	Austria AUT 201; Christoph Skolaut; Georg Skolaut; Wolfgang Riha	Austria AUT 280; Rudi Mayr; Wolfgang Daurer; Ferdinand Huber
2003 Warnemünde	United States USA 339; Betsy Alison; Suzy Leech; Lee Icyda	United States USA 342; Hannah Swett; Joan Touchette; Melissa Purdy	New Zealand NZL 4 Sharon Ferris; Joanna White; Sara Winther
2004 Sydney	Australia AUS 54; Neville Wittey; Jean-Claude Strong; Sam Newton	Australia AUS 51; Nicky Bethwaite; Kristen Kosmala; Karyn Gojnich	Australia AUS 4 Adrian Nash; Sean Edmiston; Ian Steve
2005 Mondsee	Netherlands NED 332; Maarten Jamin; Gert-Henk Bakker; Jansje Hofstra	Netherlands NED 328; Tom Otte; Marijke van Dijk; Ester Otte	United States USA 329; John Ingalls; Jamey Randall; Bruce Chafee
2006 La Rochelle	United States USA 348; John Ingalls; Jamey Randall; Mikael Komar	Netherlands NED 328; Tom Otte; Marijke van Dijk; Ester Otte	Denmark DEN 149; Bo Reker Andersen; Erik Prins; Henrik Brendstrup
2007 Medemblik	Netherlands; Hidde-Jan Haven; Don van Arem; Auke van der Werf	Russia; Anna Basalkina; Vladislava Ukraitseva; Yekaterina Maksimova	Russia; Yekaterina Skudina; Diyana Krutskikh; Natalya Ivanova
2008 Skovshoved	Netherlands; Tom Otte; Mark Haven; Floortje de Vries	Netherlands; Hidde-Jan Haven; Don van Arem; Miguel Karsters	Canada; Jennifer Provan; Martha Henderson; Katie Abbott
2009 Kalmar	Netherlands; Tom Otte; Mark Haven; Floortje de Vries	Netherlands; Maarten Jamin; Jaap Smolders; Jansje Hofstra	Netherlands; Hidde-Jan Haven; Don van Arem; Miguel Karsters
2010 Lelystad	United States; John Ingalls; Torey Pellegrini; Bruce Chafee	Netherlands; Yska Minks; Jaap Molenaar; Wouter Toornstra	Netherlands; Tom Otte; Sander Oostber; Jan Deen
2011 Attersee	Netherlands; Maarten Jamin; Jaap Smolders; Menno Berens	Netherlands; Tom Otte; Mark Haven; Floor de Vries	Germany; Thorsten Schutt; Claudia Weber; Kai Morwinski
2012 Sydney	Netherlands; Maarten Jamin; Jaap Smolders; Menno Berens	Netherlands; Tom Otte; Diederik Kuilers; Reinier Tromp	Australia; Michael Nash; Mel Nathan; Greg Hartnett
2013 Brunnen	Netherlands; Hidde-Jan Haven; Don van Arem; Auke van der Werf	Netherlands; Tom Otte; Arjen Kort; Floor de Vries	Netherlands; Lieuwe Gietema; Diederik Kuiters; Reinier Tromp
2014 Travemünde	Netherlands; Hidde-Jan Haven; Don van Arem; Auke van der Werf	Netherlands; Maarten Jamin; Jaap Smolders; Menno Bevens	Netherlands; Lieuwe Gietema; Diederik Kuiters; Reinier Tromp
2015 Askøy	Denmark; Lucas Lier; Frederik Højgaard Berg; Konrad Floryan	Netherlands; Maarten Jamin; Jaap Smolders; Menno Bevens	Netherlands; Lieuwe Gietema; Gert Roukema; Reinier Tromp
2016 St. Gilgen	Austria; Rudolf Mayr; Anna Boustani; Philippe Boustani	Netherlands; Gert Roukema; Robbert Jan Kentgens; Michel Peulen	Netherlands; Kaj Moorman; Jasper Schuddeboom; Sam Peeks
2017; 44 Boats	NED 328; Tom Otte (NED); Jeldau van der Werf (NED); Floor Otte-de Vries (NED)	DEN 263; Lucas Lier (DEN); Mikkel Nørrelykke (DEN); Frederik Zafiryadis (DEN)	GER 1 Thorsten Schutt (GER); Veit Bücken (GER); Kai Morwinski (GER)
2018; 45 Boats	NED 335; Kaj Moorman (NED); Jasper Schuddeboom (NED); Sam Peeks (NED)	NED 336; Otte Tom (NED); Haven Mark (NED); Tromp Reinier (NED)	NED 355; Maarten Jamin (NED); Jaap Smolders (NED); Cristel Pessers (NED)
2019; 22 Boats	NED 355; Maarten Jamin (NED); Jaap Smolders (NED); Cristel Pessers (NED)	USA 316; Luke Ingalls (USA); Dakota Northrup (USA); Ian Nannig (USA)	USA-302; Bruce Chafee (USA); Ben Shore (USA); Brodt Taylor (USA)
2020	CANCELLED COVID		
2021; 51 Boats	NED 353; Yska Minks (NED); Jildau Toonstra-ter Horst (NED); Wouter Toornstra (NED)	AUS 88; David Chapman (AUS); Ute Wagner; Luisa KRUEGER	NED 355; Maarten Jamin (NED); Cristel Pessers (NED); Jaap Smolders (NED)
2022	NED 355 - NYNKE; Maarten Jamin (NED); Cristel Pessers (NED); Jaap Smolders (NED)	AUT 369; Stefan Frauscher (AUT); Josef Weinhofer (AUT); Christian Spiessberger (AUT)	BEL 358; Stefan Wuyts (BEL); Bart Goosen (BEL); Reinier De Kler (BEL)
2023	NOR 405 - Fetter Fart; Joakim Skovly (NOR); Kjell Eirik Irgens Henanger (NOR); Stian Soltvedt (NOR)	GER 277 - immer süd³ Ralf Teichmann (GER); Jos Vaes (GER); Theresa Neu (GER)	DEN 24 - Ginger; Marc Wain Pedersen (DEN); Michael Empacher (DEN); Kristian Schaldemose (DEN)|
2024	AUT 285 - Wolfgang Buchinger (AUT); Michael Nake (AUT); Karin Schöberl (AUT)	NED 350 - Reinier De Kler (NED); Marije Willemsen (NED); Theresa Neu (GER)	NED 355 - Nynke; Marten Jamin (NED); Jaap Smolders (NED); Cristel Pessers (NED)|
2025	NED 353; Yska Minks (NED); Wouter Toornstra (NED); Barbara Huber (NED)	SUI 458; Maja Siegenthaler (SUI); Patrick Morgenthaler (SUI); Michèle Guggisberg (SUI)	NED 350; R. De Kler (NED); Marco Prins (NED); Edwin Kooyman (NED)
2026	NOR 414; Saga Stokkeland Koefoed (NOR); Espen Stokkeland (NOR); Alexandra Koefoed (NOR)	NOR 350; Kristian Nergaard (NOR); Kalle Nergaard (NOR); Hans Herman Nergaard (NOR)	NOR 405; Joakim Skovly (NOR); Kjell Eirik Irgens Henanger (NOR); Stian Soltvedt (NOR)

== Medalists – Female Worlds ==
Year	Gold	Silver	Bronze
2001 Newport	Betsy Alison (USA)	Hannah Swett (USA)	Jody Swanson (USA)
2002 Brunnen	Spain; Mónica Azón; Laia Tutzó; Sandra Azón	Germany; Ulrike Schümann; Wibke Bülle; Winnie Lippert	United States; Betsy Alison; Lee Icyda; Suzy Leech
2003 Cádiz	United States; Hannah Swett; Joan Touchett; Melissa Purdy	Germany; Ulrike Schümann; Wibke Bülle; Winnie Lippert	Denmark; Dorte Jensen; Helle Jespersen; Rachel Kiel
2004 Santander	Denmark; Trine Palludan; Christina Otzen; Ida Hartvig	Denmark; Dorte Jensen; Helle Jespersen; Rachel Kiel	United States; Carol Cronin; Elizabeth Filter; Nancy Haberland
2005 Mondsee	United States; Sally Barkow; Carrie Howe; Debbie Capozzi	New Zealand; Sharon Ferris; Raynor Smeal; Ashley Holtum	Russia; Vlada Ilienko; Ekaterina Kovalenko; Natalia Gaponovich
2006 La Rochelle	Spain; Monica Azón; Graciela Pisonero; Sandra Azón	Germany; Ulrike Schümann; Runa Kappen; Ute Höptner	United States; Sally Barkow; Carrie Howe; Debbie Capozzi
2007 Cascais	Great Britain; Sarah Ayton; Sarah Webb; Pippa Wilson	United States; Sally Barkow; Carrie Howe; Debbie Capozzi	Great Britain; Shirley Robertson; Lucy MacGregor; Annie Lush
2008 Miami	Great Britain; Sarah Ayton; Sarah Webb; Pippa Wilson	Australia; Krystal Weir; Karyn Gojnich; Angela Farrell	Germany; Ulrike Schümann; Julia Bleck; Ute Höptner

== See also ==
- World championships in sailing
- World Sailing
