= Sailing at the 2008 Summer Olympics – Yngling =

Women's Yngling at the Games of the XXIX Olympiad
- Line drawing of the Yngling
- Venue: Qingdao International Sailing Centre
- Dates: First race: 9 August 2008; Last race: 17 August 2008
- Competitors: 45 from 15 nations
- Teams: 15 boats

Medalists
1st place, gold medalist(s)		Sarah Ayton; Sarah Webb; Pippa Wilson	Great Britain
2nd place, silver medalist(s)		Mandy Mulder; Annemieke Bes; Merel Witteveen	Netherlands
3rd place, bronze medalist(s)		Sofia Bekatorou; Virginia Kravarioti; Sofia Papadopoulou	Greece

The Women's Yngling was a sailing event on the Sailing at the 2008 Summer Olympics program in Qingdao International Sailing Centre. Eleven races (last one a medal race) were scheduled. Only nine races were completed including the medal race due to lack of wind. 45 sailors, on 15 boats, from 15 nations competed. Ten boats qualified for the medal race.

== Race schedule ==
●	Practice race	●	Race on Yellow	●	Race on Pink	●	Medal race on Yellow

Date	August																	
Date	7 Thu	8 Fri	9 Sat	10 Sun	11 Mon	12 Tue	13 Wed	14 Thu	15 Fri	16 Sat	17 Sun	18 Mon	19 Tue	20 Wed	21 Thu	22 Fri	23 Sat	24 Sun
Actual	●		S,1,2	S3,4	S5,6	Res	S7	No wind	S8	No wind	MR							

== Course areas and course configurations ==
For the Yngling course areas A (Yellow) and E (Pink) were used. The location (36°1'26"’N, 120°26'52"E) points to the center of the 0.6nm radius Yellow course area and the location (36°2'44"N, 120°28'9"E) points to the center of the 0.75nm radius Pink course area. The target time for the course was about 60 minutes for the races and 30 minutes for the medal race. The race management could choose from several course configurations.

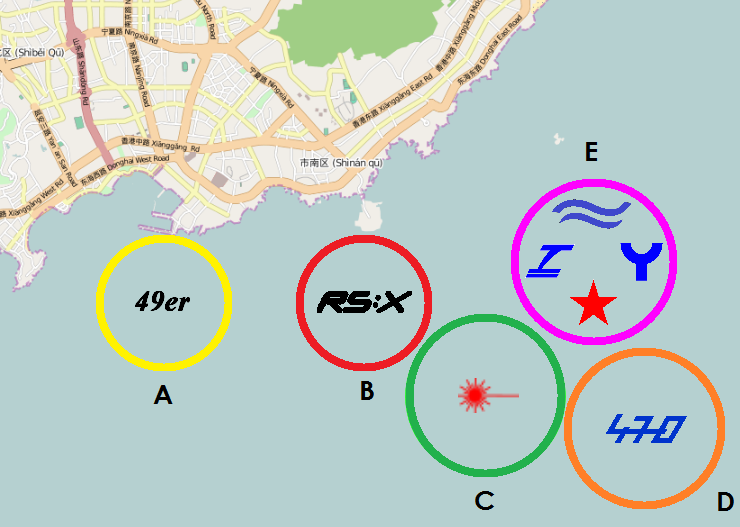
Course Areas

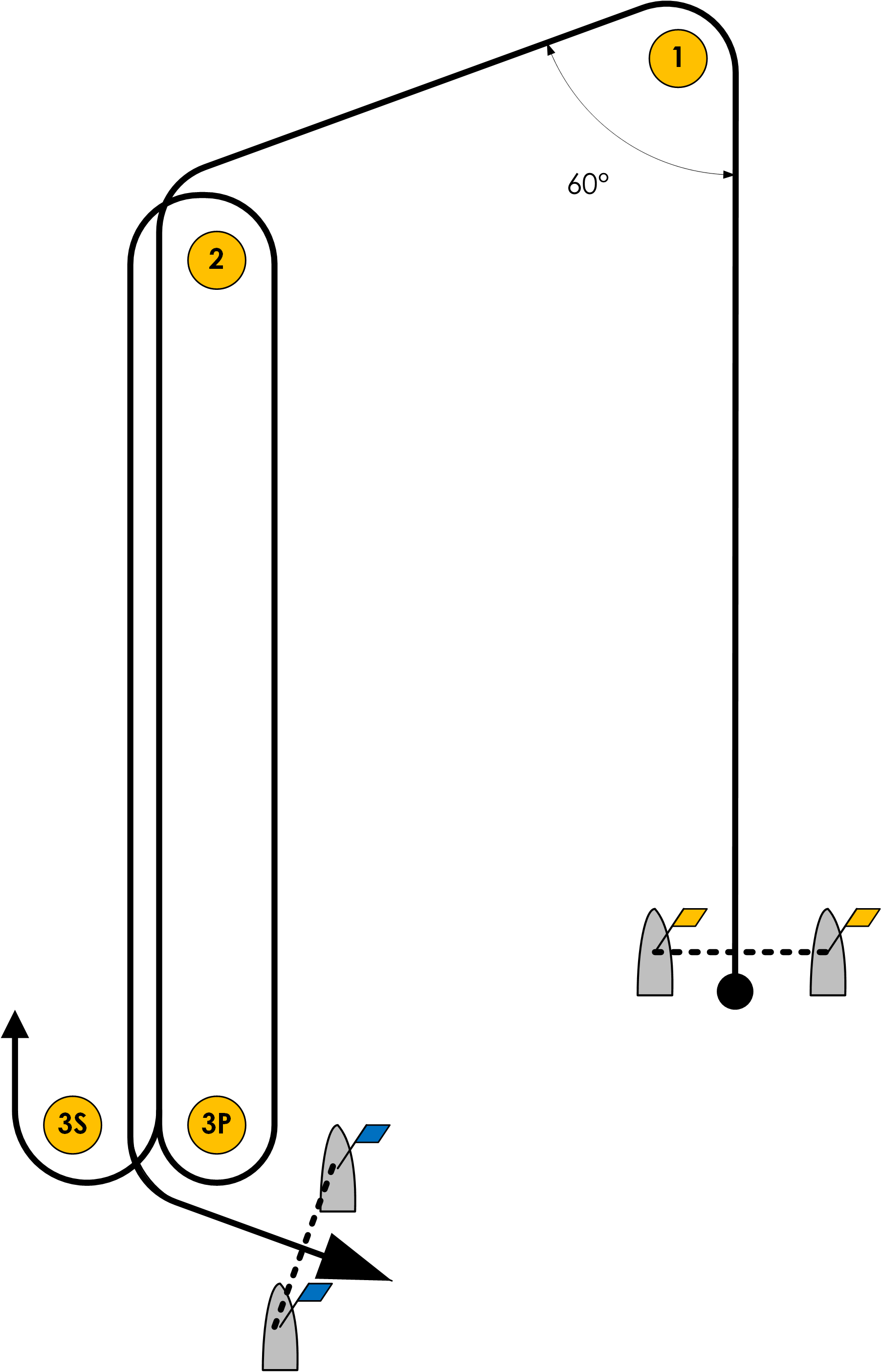
60° Trapezoid Outer Course (O)

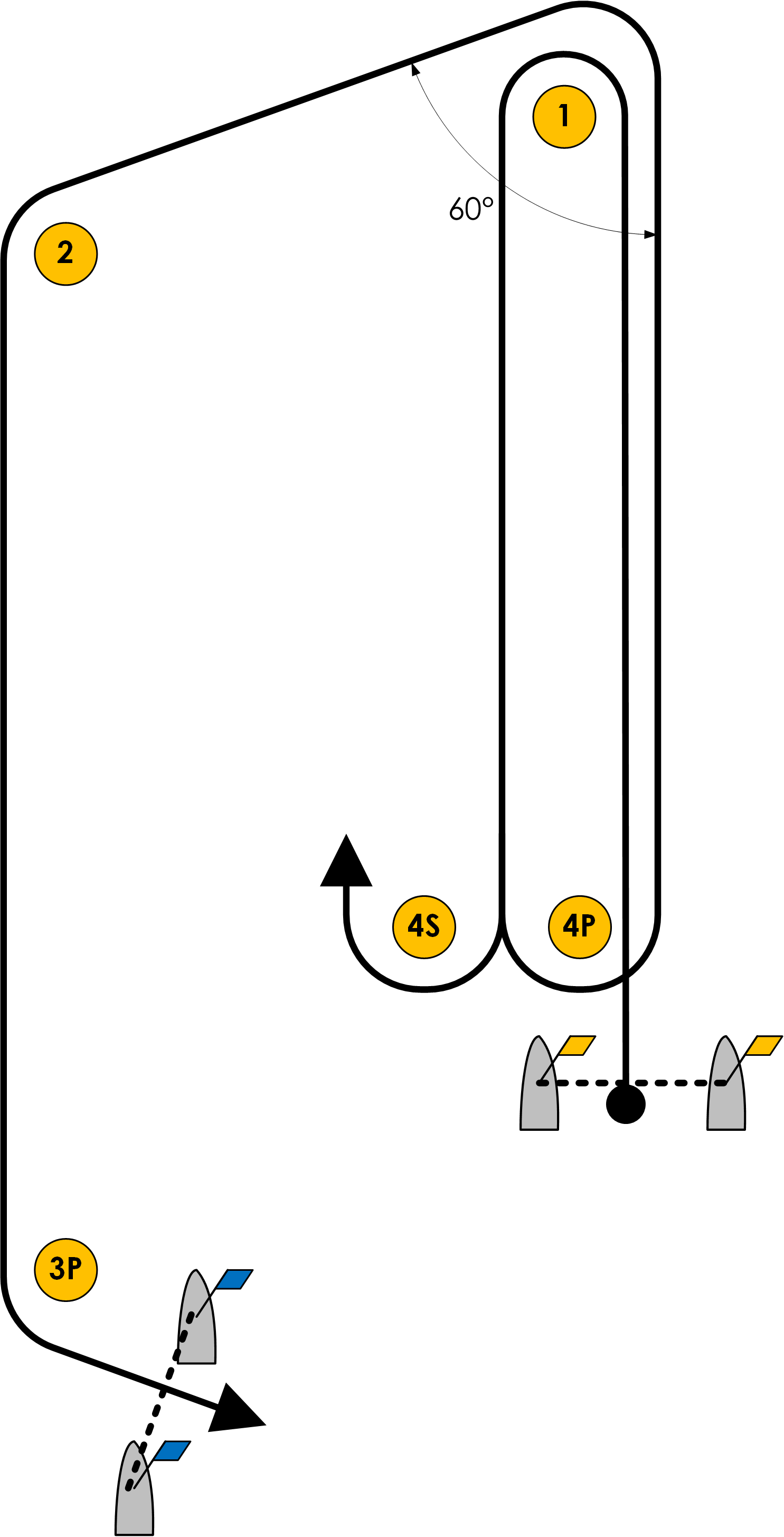
60° Trapezoid Inner Course (I)

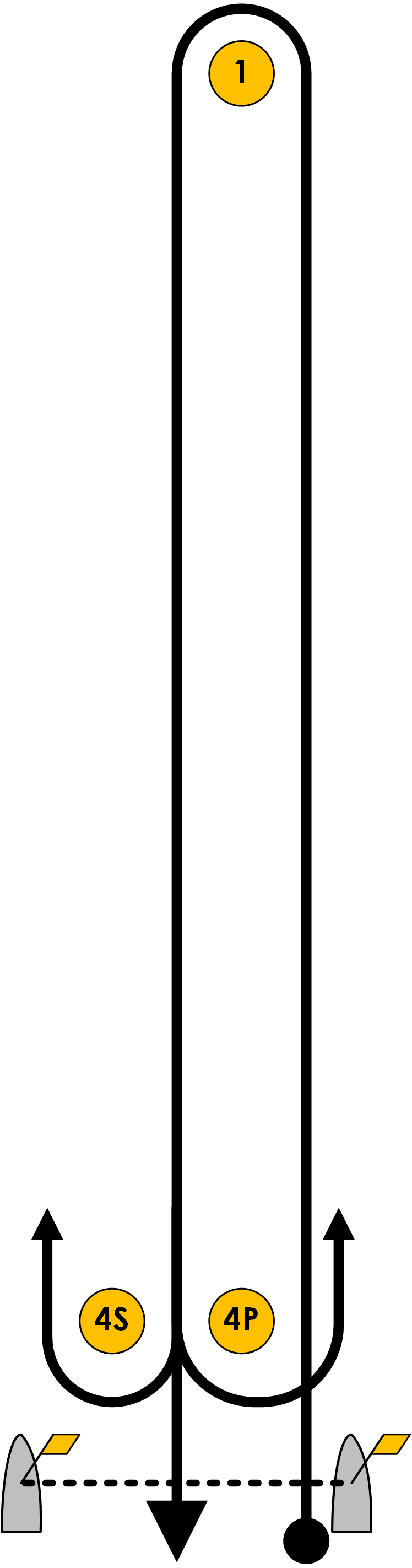
Windward - Leeward Course (W)

=== Outer courses ===
- O1: Start – 1 – 2 – 3s/3p – 2 – 3p – Finish
- O2: Start – 1 – 2 – 3s/3p – 2 – 3s/3p – 2 – 3p – Finish
- O3: Start – 1 – 2 – 3s/3p – 2 – 3s/3p – 2 – 3s/3p – 2 – 3p – Finish

=== Inner courses ===
- I1: Start – 1 – 4s/4p – 1 – 2 – 3p – Finish
- I2: Start – 1 – 4s/4p – 1 – 4s/4p – 1 – 2 – 3p – Finish
- I3: Start – 1 – 4s/4p – 1 – 4s/4p – 1 – 4s/4p – 1 – 2 – 3p – Finish

=== Windward-leeward courses ===
- W2: Start – 1 – 4s/4p – 1 – Finish
- W3: Start – 1 – 4s/4p – 1 – 4s/4p – 1 – Finish
- W4: Start – 1 – 4s/4p – 1 – 4s/4p – 1 – 4s/4p – 1 – Finish

== Weather conditions ==
In the lead up to the Olympics many questioned the choice of Qingdao as a venue with very little predicted wind. During the races the wind was pretty light and quite unpredictable. Due to lack of wind (< 1.6 knots) one racing day was cancelled and the medal race was postponed to the next day.

== Final results ==
Rank	Country	Helmsman	Crew	Race 1		Race 2		Race 3		Race 4		Race 5		Race 6		Race 7		Race 8		Medalrace		Total	Total – discard
Rank	Country	Helmsman	Crew	Pos.	Pts.	Pos.	Pts.	Pos.	Pts.	Pos.	Pts.	Pos.	Pts.	Pos.	Pts.	Pos.	Pts.	Pos.	Pts.	Pos.	Pts.	Total	Total – discard
1st place, gold medalist(s)	Great Britain	Sarah Ayton	Sarah Webb; Pippa Wilson	2	2.0	3	3.0	4	4.0	~~7~~	~~7.0~~	4	4.0	2	2.0	2	2.0	5	5.0	1	2.0	31.0	24.0
2nd place, silver medalist(s)	Netherlands	Mandy Mulder	Annemieke Bes; Merel Witteveen	9	9.0	1	1.0	2	2.0	~~13~~	~~13.0~~	1	1.0	5	5.0	4	4.0	1	1.0	4	8.0	44.0	31.0
3rd place, bronze medalist(s)	Greece	Sofia Bekatorou	Virginia Kravarioti; Sofia Papadopoulou	10	10.0	12	12.0	9	9.0	3	3.0	2	2.0	~~OCS~~	~~16.0~~	3	3.0	3	3.0	3	6.0	64.0	48.0
4	Germany	Ulrike Schümann	Ute Höpfner; Julia Bleck	8	8.0	7	7.0	7	7.0	11	11.0	11	11.0	3	3.0	5	5.0	~~13~~	~~13.0~~	2	4.0	69.0	56.0
5	France	Anne le Helley	Catherine Lepesant; Julie Gerecht	4	4.0	~~15~~	~~15.0~~	1	1.0	14	14.0	5	5.0	10	10.0	10	10.0	2	2.0	5	10.0	71.0	56.0
6	Russia	Ekaterina Skudina	Diana Krutskikh; Natalia Ivanova	3	3.0	8	8.0	12	12.0	10	10.0	~~15~~	~~15.0~~	1	1.0	6	6.0	6	6.0	5	10.0	71.0	56.0
7	United States	Sally Barkow	Carrie Howe; Deborah Capozzi	~~14~~	~~14.0~~	2	2.0	8	8.0	5	5.0	6	6.0	11	11.0	1	1.0	10	10.0	9	18.0	75.0	61.0
8	China	Song Xiaqun	Yu Yanli; Li Xiaoni	7	7.0	5	5.0	~~DSQ~~	~~16.0~~	4	4.0	13	13.0	6	6.0	8	8.0	4	4.0	8	16.0	79.0	63.0
9	Norway	Siren Sundby	Lise Birgitte Fredriksen; Alexandra Koefoed	12	12.0	~~13~~	~~13.0~~	5	5.0	1	1.0	3	3.0	13	13.0	12	12.0	11	11.0	7	14.0	84.0	71.0
10	Australia	Krystal Weir	Karyn Gojnich; Angela Farrell	1	1.0	11	11.0	6	6.0	~~12~~	~~12.0~~	7	7.0	7	7.0	9	9.0	8	8.0	DSQ	22.0	83.0	71.0
11	Finland	Silja Lehtinen	Maria Klemetz; Livia Väresmaa	6	6.0	6	6.0	3	3.0	8	8.0	10	10.0	~~OCS~~	~~16.0~~	15	15.0	12	12.0	-	-	76.0	60.0
12	South Africa	Dominique Provoyeur	Kim Rew; Penny Alison	13	13.0	10	10.0	11	11.0	2	2.0	12	12.0	8	8.0	~~13~~	~~13.0~~	7	7.0	-	-	76.0	63.0
13	Canada	Jennifer Provan	Martha Henderson; Katie Abbott	5	5.0	4	4.0	10	10.0	~~15~~	~~15.0~~	9	9.0	12	12.0	11	11.0	15	15.0	-	-	81.0	66.0
14	Spain	Mónica Azón	Sandra Azón; Graciela Pisonero	11	11.0	9	9.0	~~14~~	~~14.0~~	6	6.0	14	14.0	4	4.0	14	14.0	9	9.0	-	-	81.0	67.0
15	Italy	Chiara Calligaris	Francesca Scognamillo; Giulia Pignolo	~~15~~	~~15.0~~	14	14.0	13	13.0	9	9.0	8	8.0	9	9.0	7	7.0	14	14.0	-	-	89.0	74.0

Legend: – Qualified for next phase; DSQ – Disqualified; OCS – On the course side of the starting line;
Discard is crossed out and does not count for the overall result.

== Daily standings ==
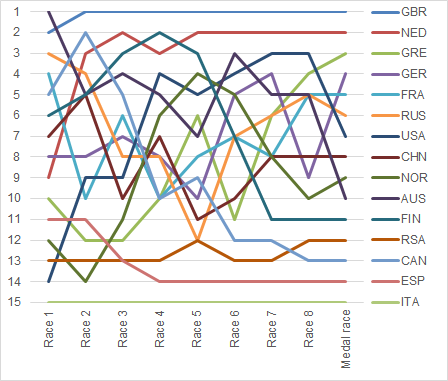
Graph showing the daily standings in the Yngling during the 2008 Summer Olympics
