= Sailing at the 2008 Summer Olympics =

Sailing at the Games of the XXIX Olympiad
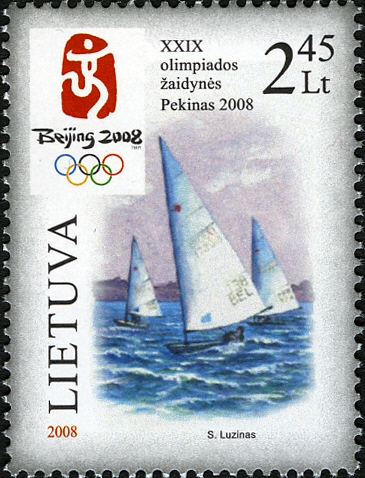
- Sailing at the 2008 Summer Olympics depicted on a Lithuanian stamp
- Venues: Qingdao International Sailing Centre
- Dates: First race: 9 August 2008; Last race: 21 August 2008
- Competitors: 400 (261 male, 139 female) from 62 nations
- Boats: 272

Sailing/Yachting is an Olympic sport starting from the Games of the 1st Olympiad (1896 Olympics in Athens, Greece). With the exception of 1904 and possibly the cancelled 1916 Summer Olympics, sailing has always been included on the Olympic schedule. The Sailing program of 2008 consisted of a total of nine sailing classes (eleven disciplines). Eleven races are scheduled for each event except for the 49er class, for which 16 races are scheduled from 9 August 2008 to 21 August 2008 of the coast of the Qingdao International Sailing Centre facing the Yellow Sea. Of the 11 (16) races, 10 (15) are scheduled as opening races and one as a medal race. The sailing was done on four different types of courses.

== Venue ==
Qingdao International Sailing Centre
- 青岛奥林匹克帆船中心
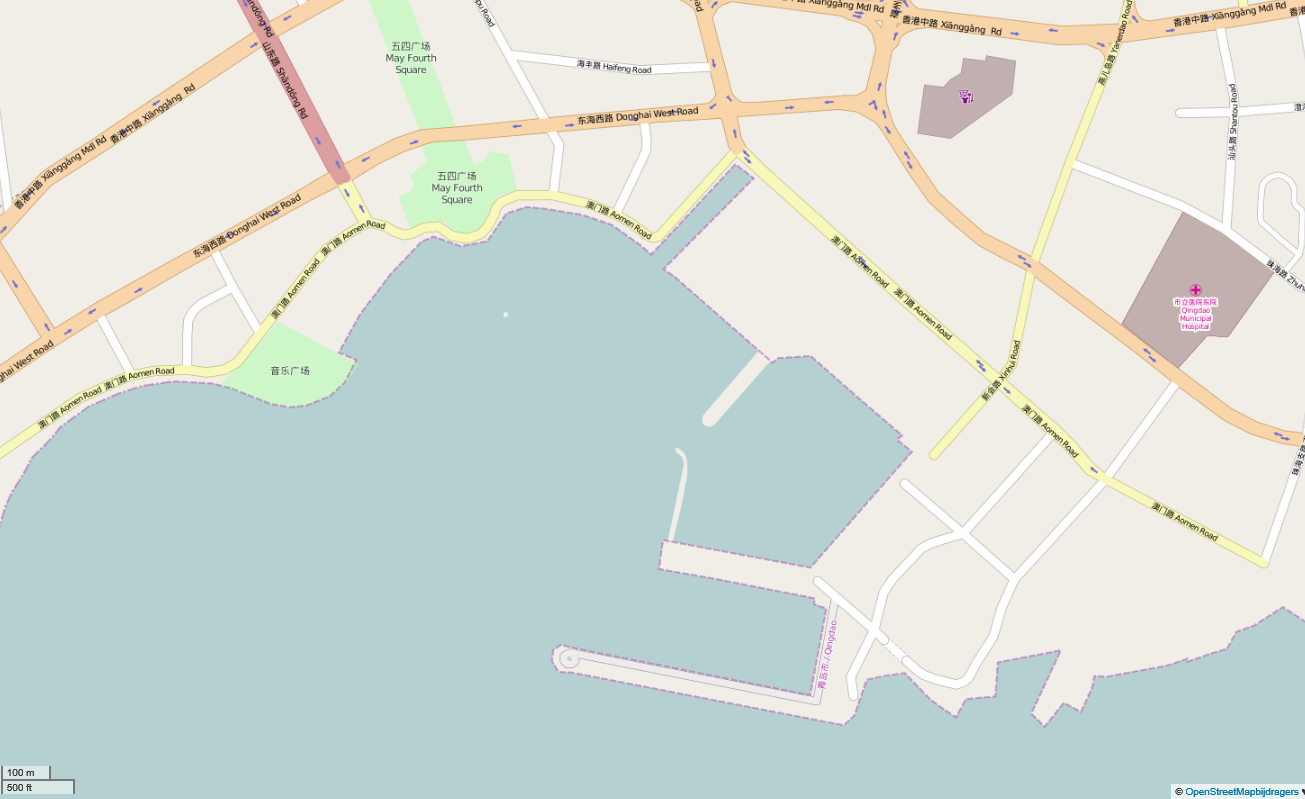

General information
- Status: Completed
- Type: Olympic harbor Including: Qingdao Sub-Village, Athletes Center, Administrative Center, Venue Media Center, Logistics Center, Reception Center and Accreditation Center.
- Location: ShiNan District, Fushan Bay Area, XinHui Road, Qingdao, Shandong Province. China, China
- Coordinates: 36°03′23″N 120°23′13″E
- Elevation: Sealevel
- Construction started: 25 May 2004
- Opened: 2008

Technical details
- Floor area: 45 hectares, comprising a 30 hectare competition area and a 15 hectare area for development after the Games

According to the IOC statutes the contests in all sport disciplines must be held either in, or as close as possible to the city which the IOC has chosen. Among others, an exception is made for the Olympic yachting events, which customarily must be staged on the open sea. On account of this principle, Qingdao was selected for the honor to carry out the Olympic yachting regattas. For that purpose the Qingdao International Sailing Centre was constructed.

=== Course areas ===
A total of five race areas were set on the Yellow Sea of the coast of Qingdao. The location points to the center of the 0.6 nm radius circle for course area A & B and to a 0.75 nm radius circle for course area's C D and E.

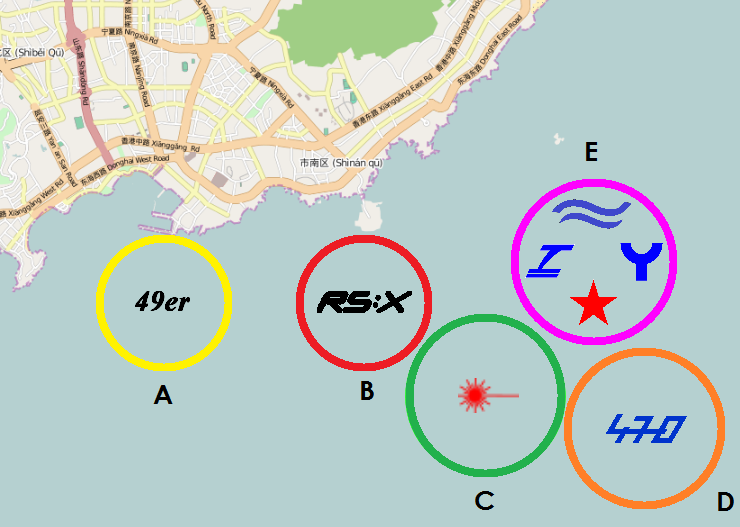
Olympic Course Area's 2008. A ( Yellow): 36°2'23"N, 120°23'12"E (49er) B ( Red): 36°2'21"N, 120°25'32"E(RS:X) C ( Green): 36°1'26"’N, 120°26'52"E (Laser & Laser Radial) D ( Orange): 36°1'10"N, 120°28'47"E (470) E ( Pink): 36°2'44"N, 120°28'9"E (Finn, Yngling, Tornado & Star)

== Competition ==
=== Overview ===
Continents	Countries	Classes	Boats	Male	Female
6	62	11	272	261	139

=== Continents ===
- Africa
- Asia
- Oceania
- Europe
- North America
- South America

=== Countries ===
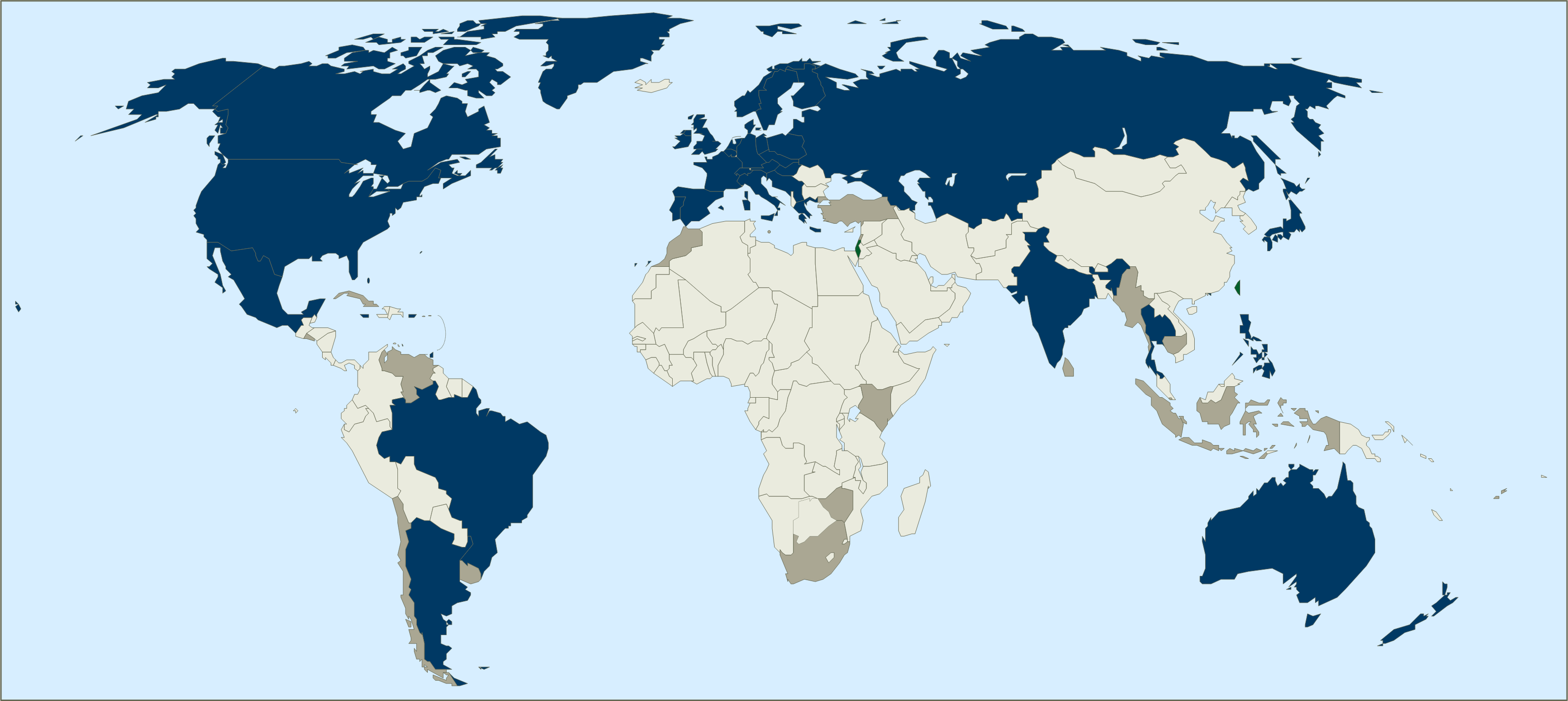
Countries that participated in the Sailing event of the 1972 Olympic Games. Blue: Water Gray: Never participated in OG Dark Gray: Participated in earlier OG Green: Country participated for the first time Dark Blue: Country participated also on previous games Red: Country boycotted the sailing event of the OG

Argentina	Australia	Austria	Barbados
Belgium	Belarus	Brazil	Bulgaria
Canada	Chile	China	Colombia
Croatia	Cyprus	Czech Republic	Denmark
Dominican Republic	Spain	Estonia	Finland
France	Great Britain	Germany	Greece
Guatemala	Hong Kong	Hungary	Indonesia
India	Ireland	Israel	Virgin Islands
Italy	Japan	South Korea	Lithuania
Luxembourg	Malaysia	Mexico	Netherlands
Norway	New Zealand	Paraguay	Peru
Poland	Portugal	South Africa	Russia
Seychelles	Singapore	Slovenia	Switzerland
Slovakia	Sweden	Thailand	Chinese Taipei
Turkey	United Arab Emirates	Ukraine	Uruguay
United States	Venezuela

=== Classes (equipment) ===
Class	Type	Event	Sailors	Trapeze	Mainsail	Jib/Genoa	Spinnaker	First OG	Olympics so far
RS:X	Sailboard		1	-	+	-	-	2008	1
RS:X	Sailboard		1	-	+	-	-	2008	1
Laser Radial	Dinghy		1	-	+	-	-	2008	1
Laser	Dinghy		1	-	+	-	-	1996	4
Finn	Dinghy		1	0	+	–	–	1952	15
470	Dinghy		2	1	+	+	+	1988	6
470	Dinghy		2	1	+	+	+	1976	9
49er	Dinghy		2	2	+	+	+	2000	3
Tornado	Multihull		2	2	+	+	+	1976	9
Yngling	Keelboat		3	0	+	+	+	2004	2
Star	Keelboat		2	0	+	+	–	1932	17

2008 Olympic Classes designs

== Race schedule ==
=== Actual schedule ===
PR	Practice race	S	Series race	MR	Medal race	●	Race on Yellow	●	Race on Red	●	Race on Green	●	Race on Orange	●	Race on Pink

Date	August																	
Date	7 Thu	8 Fri	9 Sat	10 Sun	11 Mon	12 Tue	13 Wed	14 Thu	15 Fri	16 Sat	17 Sun	18 Mon	19 Tue	20 Wed	21 Thu	22 Fri	23 Sat	24 Sun
Ceremonies		●																●
Windsurfing - Male - RS:X				●	S1,2	S3,4	Res	No wind	S5	No wind	S6,7	S8,9	S10	MR				
Windsurfing - Female - RS:X				PR	S1,2	S3,4	Res	No wind	S5	No wind	S6,7	S7,8	S9	MR				
One Person Dinghy - Male - Laser					PR	S1,2	S3	No wind	S4	S5	S6	S7,8,9	MR					
One Person Dinghy - Female - Laser Radial					PR	S1,2	S3	No wind	S4	S5	S6	S7,8,9	MR					
One Person Dinghy - Open - Finn	PR		S1,2	S3,4	S5,6	Res	S7	No wind	S8	No wind	MR							
Two Person Dinghy - Male - 470				PR	S1,2	S3,4	S,5,6	Res	S7,8	S8,10	Res	MR						
Two Person Dinghy - Female - 470				PR	S1,2	S3,4	S5,6	Res	S7,8	S9,10	Res	MR						
Skiff - Open - 49er	PR			S1,2,3	S4,5,6	Res	S7,8,9	No wind	No wind	S10,11,12	MR							
Multihul - Open - Tornado								PR	S1	S2,3	S4	S5,6,7	No wind	S9,10,11	MR			
Keelboat - Male - Star								PR	S1	S2,3	S4	S5,6,7	No wind	S8,9,10	MR			
Keelboat - Female - Yngling	●		S,1,2	S3,4	S5,6	Res	S7	No wind	S8	No wind	MR							

== Medal summary ==
=== Women's events ===
Games	Gold	Silver	Bronze
2008: Women's RS:X	China (CHN); Yin Jian	Italy (ITA); Alessandra Sensini	Great Britain (GBR); Bryony Shaw
2008: Laser Radial	United States (USA); Anna Tunnicliffe	Lithuania (LTU); Gintarė Volungevičiūtė	China (CHN); Xu Lijia
2008: Women's 470	Australia (AUS); Elise Rechichi; Tessa Parkinson	Netherlands (NED); Marcelien de Koning; Lobke Berkhout	Brazil (BRA); Fernanda Oliveira; Isabel Swan
2008: Yngling	Great Britain (GBR); Sarah Ayton; Sarah Webb; Pippa Wilson	Netherlands (NED); Mandy Mulder; Annemieke Bes; Merel Witteveen	Greece (GRE); Sofia Bekatorou; Virginia Kravarioti; Sofia Papadopoulou

=== Men's events ===
Games	Gold	Silver	Bronze
2008: Men's RS:X	New Zealand (NZL); Tom Ashley	France (FRA); Julien Bontemps	Israel (ISR); Shahar Tzuberi
2008: Laser	Great Britain (GBR); Paul Goodison	Slovenia (SLO); Vasilij Žbogar	Italy (ITA); Diego Romero
2008: Men's 470	Australia (AUS); Nathan Wilmot; Malcolm Page	Great Britain (GBR); Nick Rogers; Joe Glanfield	France (FRA); Nicolas Charbonnier; Olivier Bausset
2008: Star	Great Britain (GBR); Iain Percy; Andrew Simpson	Brazil (BRA); Robert Scheidt; Bruno Prada	Sweden (SWE); Fredrik Lööf; Anders Ekström

=== Open events ===
Games	Gold	Silver	Bronze
2008: Finn	Great Britain (GBR); Ben Ainslie	United States (USA); Zach Railey	France (FRA); Guillaume Florent
2008: 49er	Denmark (DEN); Jonas Warrer; Martin Kirketerp	Spain (ESP); Iker Martínez de Lizarduy; Xabier Fernández	Germany (GER); Jan-Peter Peckolt; Hannes Peckolt
2008: Tornado	Spain (ESP); Antón Paz; Fernando Echávarri	Australia (AUS); Darren Bundock; Glenn Ashby	Argentina (ARG); Santiago Lange; Carlos Espínola

== Medal table ==
Rank	Nation	Gold	Silver	Bronze	Total
1	Great Britain	4	1	1	6
2	Australia	2	1	0	3
3	Spain	1	1	0	2
3	United States	1	1	0	2
5	China	1	0	1	2
6	Denmark	1	0	0	1
6	New Zealand	1	0	0	1
8	Netherlands	0	2	0	2
9	France	0	1	2	3
10	Brazil	0	1	1	2
10	Italy	0	1	1	2
12	Lithuania	0	1	0	1
12	Slovenia	0	1	0	1
14	Argentina	0	0	1	1
14	Germany	0	0	1	1
14	Greece	0	0	1	1
14	Israel	0	0	1	1
14	Sweden	0	0	1	1
Totals (18 entries)		11	11	11	33

== See also ==
- Sailing at the 2008 Summer Paralympics

== Sources ==
- Official Report of the Beijing 2008 Olympic Games • Volume I Bid Documents and Analysis: Passion behind the Bid (PDF). Archived from the original (PDF) on 22 February 2014.
- Official Report of the Beijing 2008 Olympic Games • Volume III Preparation for the Games: New Beijing Great Olympics (PDF). Archived from the original (PDF) on 22 February 2014.
- Official Report of the Beijing 2008 Olympic Games • Volume II Ceremonies and Competitions: Celebration of the Games (PDF). Archived from the original (PDF) on 22 February 2014.
- Official Results book Part 3 (Sailing) (PDF). Archived from the original (PDF) on 22 February 2014.
- "Sailing at the 2008 Beijing Summer Games". Olympics at Sports-Reference.com. Sports Reference LLC. Archived from the original on 17 April 2020.
- "Beijing 2008". Olympics.com. International Olympic Committee.
