= Sailing at the 2004 Summer Olympics – Yngling =

Woman's Yngling at the Games of the XXVIII Olympiad
- Line drawing of the Yngling
- Venue: Agios Kosmas Olympic Sailing Centre
- Dates: First race: 14 August 2004; Last race: 20 August 2004
- Competitors: 48 from 16 nations

Medalists
1st place, gold medalist(s)		Shirley Robertson; Sarah Webb; Sarah Ayton	Great Britain
2nd place, silver medalist(s)		Ruslana Taran; Ganna Kalinina; Svitlana Matevusheva	Ukraine
3rd place, bronze medalist(s)		Dorte Jensen; Helle Jespersen; Christina Otzen	Denmark

The Women's Yngling was a sailing event on the Sailing at the 2004 Summer Olympics program in Agios Kosmas Olympic Sailing Centre. Eleven races were scheduled and completed with one discard. 48 sailors, on 16 boats, from 16 nation competed.

== Race schedule ==
●	Practice races	●	Competition day	●	Last day of racing

Date	August																	
Date	12 Thu	13 Fri	14 Sat	15 Sun	16 Mon	17 Tue	18 Wed	19 Thu	20 Fri	21 Sat	22 Sun	23 Mon	24 Tue	25 Wed	26 Thu	27 Fri	28 Sat	29 Sun
Actual	●	●	1,2	3,4	5,6	Res	7,8	9,10	Res	MR								
Scheduled	PR		S1,2	S3,4	S5,6	Res	S7,8	S9,10	Res	MR								

== Final results ==
Rank	Country	Helmsman	Crew	Race 1		Race 2		Race 3		Race 4		Race 5		Race 6		Race 7		Race 8		Race 9		Race 10		Race 11		Total	Total – discard
Rank	Country	Helmsman	Crew	Pos.	Pts.	Pos.	Pts.	Pos.	Pts.	Pos.	Pts.	Pos.	Pts.	Pos.	Pts.	Pos.	Pts.	Pos.	Pts.	Pos.	Pts.	Pos.	Pts.	Pos.	Pts.	Total	Total – discard
1st place, gold medalist(s)	Great Britain	Shirley Robertson	Sarah Webb; Sarah Ayton	5	5.0	4	4.0	1	1.0	1	1.0	4	4.0	3	3.0	4	4.0	6	6.0	3	3.0	8	8.0	~~DNC~~	~~17.0~~	56.0	39.0
2nd place, silver medalist(s)	Ukraine	Ruslana Taran	Ganna Kalinina; Svitlana Matevusheva	10	10.0	3	3.0	9	9.0	3	3.0	7	7.0	2	2.0	2	2.0	RDG	8.0	1	1.0	~~16~~	~~16.0~~	5	5.0	66.0	50.0
3rd place, bronze medalist(s)	Denmark	Dorte Jensen	Helle Jespersen; Christina Otzen	1	1.0	14	14.0	5	5.0	5	5.0	5	5.0	6	6.0	3	3.0	4	4.0	6	6.0	5	5.0	~~OCS~~	~~17.0~~	71.0	54.0
4	Netherlands	Annelies Thies	Annemieke Bes; Petronella de Jong	8	8.0	1	1.0	~~13~~	~~13.0~~	8	8.0	3	3.0	5	5.0	8	8.0	RDG	12.0	5	5.0	4	4.0	2	2.0	69.0	56.0
5	France	Anne le Helley	Elodie Lesaffre; Marion Deplanque	3	3.0	2	2.0	~~14~~	~~14.0~~	11	11.0	9	9.0	13	13.0	10	10.0	3	3.0	2	2.0	3	3.0	1	1.0	71.0	57.0
6	Germany	Kristin Wagner	Anna Höll; Veronika Lochbrunner	9	9.0	8	8.0	2	2.0	12	12.0	1	1.0	7	7.0	~~15~~	~~15.0~~	5	5.0	11	11.0	13	13.0	8	8.0	91.0	76.0
7	New Zealand	Sharon Ferris	Joanna White; Kylie Jameson	15	15.0	~~16~~	~~16.0~~	3	3.0	2	2.0	2	2.0	9	9.0	11	11.0	7	7.0	12	12.0	7	7.0	9	9.0	93.0	77.0
8	Russia	Ekaterina Skudina	Tatiana Lartseva; Diana Krutskikh	6	6.0	5	5.0	11	11.0	~~DSQ~~	~~17.0~~	14	14.0	4	4.0	13	13.0	1	1.0	10	10.0	12	12.0	3	3.0	96.0	79.0
9	Norway	Karianne Eikeland	Beate Kristiansen; Lise Birgitte Fredriksen	14	14.0	13	13.0	4	4.0	6	6.0	10	10.0	1	1.0	14	14.0	8	8.0	9	9.0	~~15~~	~~15.0~~	6	6.0	100.0	85.0
10	United States	Carol Cronin	Liz Filter; Nancy Haberland	2	2.0	10	10.0	16	16.0	9	9.0	15	15.0	10	10.0	1	1.0	15	15.0	7	7.0	1	1.0	~~OCS~~	~~17.0~~	103.0	86.0
11	Greece	Aikaterini Giakomidou	Eleni Dimitrakopoulou; Efi Mantzaraki	12	12.0	6	6.0	8	8.0	4	4.0	6	6.0	8	8.0	16	16.0	RDG	9.0	8	8.0	9	9.0	~~OCS~~	~~17.0~~	103.0	86.0
12	Spain	Mónica Azón	Graciela Pisonero; Marina Sánchez	7	7.0	7	7.0	10	10.0	14	14.0	11	11.0	11	11.0	7	7.0	~~12~~	~~12.0~~	4	4.0	6	6.0	11	11.0	100.0	86.0
13	Australia	Nicky Bethwaite	Karyn Gojnich; Kristen Kosmala	11	11.0	11	11.0	12	12.0	10	10.0	8	8.0	~~16~~	~~16.0~~	5	5.0	2	2.0	13	13.0	10	10.0	10	10.0	108.0	92.0
14	Italy	Giulia Conti	Alessandra Marenzi; Angela Baroni	16	16.0	12	12.0	7	7.0	7	7.0	13	13.0	~~15~~	~~15.0~~	6	6.0	11	11.0	14	14.0	14	14.0	7	7.0	122.0	106.0
15	Bermuda	Paula Lewin	Peta Lewin; Christine Patton	4	4.0	15	15.0	6	6.0	13	13.0	16	16.0	14	14.0	9	9.0	~~16~~	~~16.0~~	16	16.0	11	11.0	4	4.0	124.0	108.0
16	Canada	Lisa Ross	Chantal Léger; Deirdre Crampton	13	13.0	9	9.0	~~15~~	~~15.0~~	15	15.0	12	12.0	12	12.0	12	12.0	14	14.0	15	15.0	2	2.0	12	12.0	131.0	116.0

Legend: DNC – Did not come to the starting area; OCS – On the course side of the starting line; RDG – Redress given;
Discard is crossed out and does not count for the overall result.

== Daily standings ==
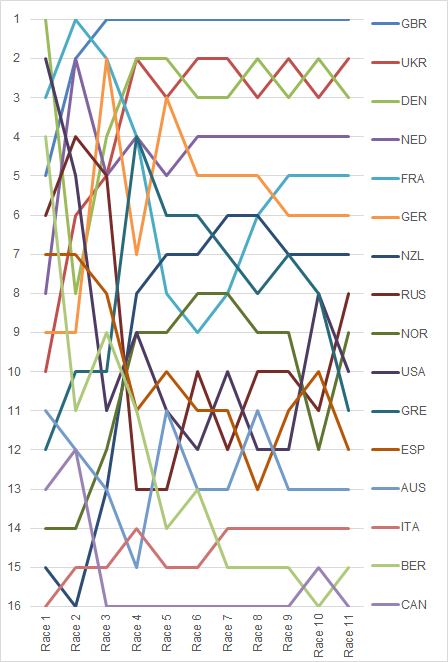
Graph showing the daily standings in the Yngling at the 2004 Summer Olympics
