= Gerecht =

Gerecht is a surname. Notable people with the surname include:

- Julie Gerecht (born 1979), French sailor
- Reuel Marc Gerecht (born 1949), American intelligence officer and writer
- Sharon Gerecht (fl. 1999), Israeli biomedical engineer
