= Karianne Eikeland =

Norwegian sailor

Personal information
- Nationality: Norway
- Born: 16 November 1972 (age 53) Bergen

Sailing career
- Sport: Sailing
- Club: Bergens Seilforening
- Class(es): Snipe, Yngling, Europe
Medal record
Sailing
Representing Norway
World Championships
Gold medal – first place	1998 Trieste	Snipe class
Bronze medal – third place	2007 Medemblik	Yngling class

Karianne Eikeland (born 16 November 1972) is a world champion and Olympic Norwegian sailor. She was born in Bergen, and has sailed for the Bergens Seilforening, the Royal Norwegian Yacht Club, and Asker Seilforening.

She won the Women's World Championship in the Snipe class in 2000.

She competed at the 2004 Summer Olympics in Athens, where she placed ninth in the Yngling class, together with Beate Kristiansen and Lise Birgitte Fredriksen.
