= Askøy Seilforening =

Norwegian sailing club

Askøy Seilforening (ASF) is a Norwegian sailing club based on the island of Askøy in Vestland county, Norway. Founded in 1979, the club is affiliated with the Norwegian Sailing Federation and is known for hosting the Yngling World Championship in 2015 and 2026. The club operates Askøy Seilsportsenter, a regional sailing venue serving western Norway.

== History ==
Askøy Seilforening was founded on 3 April 1979. The club is run primarily by volunteers and has approximately 300 members. Over several decades, club members have developed Askøy Seilsportsenter into a major sailing facility that has achieved regional status for sailing activities in Hordaland.

The club is one of the sailing clubs affiliated with the Norwegian Sailing Federation (Norges Seilforbund).

== Facilities ==
Askøy Seilforening operates Askøy Seilsportsenter, which serves as the club's base for training, racing, championships and community activities. The facility supports both dinghy and keelboat sailing and has hosted a number of regional, national and international regattas.

== Sailing activities ==
The club has active sailing programmes in several disciplines, including:

- Offshore sailing
- Keelboat racing
- Dinghy sailing
- Melges 24
- Yngling

The club organizes training, racing and social activities for sailors of different ages and experience levels.

== International championships ==
Askøy Seilforening hosted the Yngling World Championship in 2015. The championship was recognized by World Sailing and attracted competitors from multiple countries.

The event and its results were subsequently documented by the International Yngling Association in its annual magazine.

Local media reported on the championship, including the performance of local crews.

The International Yngling Association selected Askøy as host venue for the 2026 Yngling World Championship.

Preparations for the 2026 Yngling World Championship received national media attention in Norway, including a feature by the public broadcaster NRK on its television programme Norge Rundt.

The 2026 championship attracted competitors from several European countries in addition to two Australian and an Indian team, and received coverage in Scandinavian sailing media.

Official championship results were published through the Manage2Sail regatta management platform.

Norwegian crews achieved podium finishes at the 2026 championship, which was reported by Seilmagasinet.

The class has maintained a strong presence at the club, which has been described by Seilmagasinet as an important centre for Yngling sailing in Norway.

== Regattas ==
Askøy Seilforening organizes a number of annual regattas, including:

- Askøy Rundt
- Seilmakeren Doublehanded
- Hjeltefjordtrimmen
- Vårbløyta
- Thorvalden
- Askøy Race Weekend

These events attract competitors from western Norway and elsewhere in the country.

== See also ==
- Norwegian Sailing Federation
- Yngling (keelboat)
- Yngling World Championship
