= Annemieke Bes =

Dutch sailor (born 1978)

Personal information
- Full name: Annemieke Marileen Bes
- Nationality: Dutch
- Born: 16 March 1978 (age 48) Groningen
- Height: 1.77 m (5.8 ft)

Sailing career
- Sport: Sailing
- Club: Vereniging Watersport De Twee Provinciën
- Classes: Europe; Laser Radial; Yngling; Elliott 6m
Competition record
Representing Netherlands
Olympic Games
Silver medal – second place	2008 Beijing	Yngling
European Championships
Silver medal – second place	2009	Yngling
Bronze medal – third place	2008	Yngling
- Updated on 13 February 2014

Annemieke Marileen Bes (born 16 March 1978 in Groningen) is a sailor from the Netherlands, who represented her country for the first time at the 2004 Summer Olympics in Athens. The Dutch Yngling helmed by Annelies Thies and crewed by Bes and Petronella de Jong took the 4th place. Bes returned to the Olympics, again in the Dutch Yngling, during the 2008 Olympics this time with fellow crewmember Merel Witteveen and helmsman Mandy Mulder. The Dutch Yngling team took the Silver Medal in Qingdao. Bes than switched to the Elliott 6m Match racing. During the 2012 Olympics the team with helmsman Renee Groeneveld and crewmembers Bes and Marcelien Bos-de Koning took 8th place in Weymouth.

== Sailing career ==
Bes started sailing in 1990 and has competed at International level since 1999 where she started in the Europe class. Her best finishes were second at the Dutch Championship in 2000, seventh at the Semaine Olympique Hyères in 2001 and at the World championship open week that year. By the end of 2001 she switched to the Yngling class. In her first season in the Yngling class she and her teammates Petronella de Jong and Annelies Thies became second in the Princess Sofia Trophy in Palma de Mallorca. The following year she finished fifth at the Spa Regatta in Medemblik as well as fourth in the pre-Olympic event in Athens. 2004 proved to be a successful year and they won the Athens Eurolymp Week as well as the Princess Sofia Trophy. They sailed to a seventh position at the World Championships in Santander and a sixth position at the Spa Regatta, which earned them a spot at the 2004 Summer Olympics.

In 2007 a team was formed of nine sailors, (among them were Mandy Mulder, Annemieke Bes, Merel Witteveen, Renée Groeneveld, Marije Faber, Marije Kampen and Brechtje van der Werf), that aimed and qualify for the Olympics in the Yngling. In July 2008 Dutch national coach Maurice Paardekooper selected Witteveen, Mulder and Bes as the trio that would sail the Dutch Yngling team at the 2008 Summer Olympics. The selected team became fourth at the World Championship in Cascais. Furthermore, they became second in Qingdao at the Pre-Olympics, fourth at the European Championship in Warnemünde in 2007. In 2008 there was a third place in the Olympic Class Regatta of Miami And a third place at the Europeans.

With Renée Groeneveld and Brechtje van der Werf she started to sail in the new Olympic women class, The Elliott 6m Match racing class. They finished fourth at the Kiel Week Worldcup, second at the Europeans and they won the Sail for Gold Worldcup in Weymouth in September 2009 and the Prinses Sofia Worldcup event in April 2010. However this team did not qualify for the Olympics. After a team was formed with Bes, Marcelien Bos-de Koning and Mandy Mulder the qualification for the 2012 olympics was made.

In the 2017-18 edition, Bes competed in the Volvo Ocean Race on Team Sun Hung Kai/Scallywag, skippered by Aussie David Witt. The team finished in (joint) last place, alongside Dee Caffari's Turn the Tide on Plastic.
