= Dorte Jensen =

Danish sailor (born 1972)

Personal information
- Full name: Dorte Oppelstrup Jensen
- Born: 20 October 1972 (age 54) Nyborg, Denmark

Sailing career
- Sport: Sailing
- Club: Nyborg Sejlforening; Kaløvig Bådelaug
- Classes: Europe, Yngling
Medal record
Sailing
Representing Denmark
Olympic Games
Bronze medal – third place	2004 Athens	Yngling
World Championships
Gold medal – first place	1999 Genoa	Match racing
Gold medal – first place	2000 St. Petersburg	Match racing
Gold medal – first place	2001 Lago di Ledro	Match racing
Gold medal – first place	2006 Copenhagen	Match racing

Dorte Oppelstrup Jensen (born 20 October 1972 in Nyborg) is a Danish competitive sailor and Olympic medalist. She won a silver medal in the Yngling class at the 2004 Summer Olympics in Athens, together with Helle Jespersen and Christina Otzen.
