= Annelies Thies =

Dutch sailor (born 1969)

Personal information
- Full name: Antonia Allagonna Elizabeth Thies
- Nationality: Dutch
- Born: 24 November 1969 (age 56) Groningen
- Height: 1.69 m (5.5 ft)

Sailing career
- Sport: Sailing
- Club: Watersport Vereniging Amstelmeer; Vereiniging Watersport "De Twee Provinciën"
- Class: Yngling
Competition record
Representing Netherlands
Olympic Games
| 4th | 2004 Athens | Yngling |
- Updated on 15 February 2014

Antonia Allagonna Elizabeth "Annelies" Thies (born 24 November 1969, in Groningen) is a sailor from the Netherlands. Thies represented her country at the 2004 Summer Olympics in Athens. With crew members Annemieke Bes en Petronella de Jong Thies took 4th place in the Yngling.
