= Sandra Azón =

Spanish sailor (born 1973)

Personal information
- Born: 12 November 1973 (age 53) Barcelona, Spain

Sport
- Sport: Sailing
Medal record
Representing Spain
Olympic Games
| Silver medal – second place | 2004 Athens | 470 class |
470 World Championship
| Bronze medal – third place | 2000 Lake Balaton | 470 class |
| Bronze medal – third place | 2001 Koper | 470 class |
Yngling World Championship
| Gold medal – first place | 2002 Brunnen | Yngling |
| Gold medal – first place | 2006 La Rochelle | Yngling |
Summer Universiade
| Gold medal – first place | 1999 Palma de Mallorca | 470 class |

Sandra Azón Canalda (Note: In this Spanish name, the first or paternal surname is Azón and the second or maternal family name is Canalda.) (born 12 November 1973) is a Spanish sailor. She has competed at the 2000, 2004 and 2008 Summer Olympics, her sister Mónica Azón is also an Olympic sailor.

== Results ==
=== Olympics ===
- 8th at 2008 Summer Olympics in Beijing in the Yngling
- Silver medal at 2004 Summer Olympics in Athensin the 470 class crewing for Natalia Vía Dufresne.
- 6th at the Sailing at the 2000 Summer Olympics in Sydney in the 470 class crewing for Natalia Vía Dufresne

=== World Championships ===
| Pos. | Year | Event | - | Class | Notes | Ref. |
|---|---|---|---|---|---|---|
| 29 | 2011 | Melges 32 World Championship | Open | Melges 32 | | |
| 17 | 2008 | Yngling World Championship | Female | Yngling | | |
| 7 | 2007 | 2007 ISAF Sailing World Championships | Female | Yngling | | |
| 1 | 2006 | Yngling World Championship | Female | Yngling | | |
| 9 | 2005 | Yngling World Championship | Female | Yngling | | |
| 18 | 2003 | 2003 ISAF Sailing World Championships | Female | 470 | | |
| 6 | 2002 | 470 World Championships | Female | 470 | | |
| 1 | 2002 | Yngling World Championship | Female | Yngling | | |
| 3 | 2000 | 470 World Championships | Female | 470 | | |
| 5 | 1999 | 470 World Championship | Female | 470 | | |
| 4 | 1998 | 470 World Championships | Female | 470 | | |
| 17 | 1995 | 470 World Championships | Female | 470 | | |
| 13 | 1993 | 470 World Championships | Female | 470 | | |

She won world championships in the Yngling World Championship in 2002 and 2006.
