= Kosmala =

Kosmala is a surname. Notable people with the surname include:

- Jeff Kosmala (born 1961), American BMX racer
- Kristen Kosmala (born 1968), Australian sailor
- Libby Kosmala (born 1942), Australian shooter
- Stan Kosmala (born 1950), Australian Paralympic competitor
