= Merel Witteveen =

Dutch sailor (born 1985)

Personal information
- Full name: Merel Witteveen
- Nationality: Dutch
- Born: 12 May 1985 (age 41) Leiden
- Height: 1.74 m (5.7 ft)

Sailing career
- Sport: Sailing
- College team: Nereus
- Club: Koninklijke Roei- en Zeilvereniging de Maas
- Coached by: Maurice Paardekooper
- Classes: Europe; 470; Yngling
Competition record
Representing Netherlands
Olympic Games
Silver medal – second place	2008 Beijing	Yngling
European Championships
Bronze medal – third place	2008	Yngling
- Updated on 14 February 2014

Merel Witteveen (born 12 May 1985, in Leiden) is a sailor from the Netherlands. Witteveen represented her country at the 2008 Summer Olympics in Qingdao. With fellow crew member Annemieke Bes and Mandy Mulder as helmsman, Witteveen took silver medal in the Yngling.

== Sailing career ==
Witteveen started sailing in 1995 and competes in international level since 1999 where she started in the Optimist. After the European Championship in Athens she switched to the Europe. Witteveen won a silver medal at the 2003 European Junior Championship. At the Open Week World Championships in Spain she finished 9th and her next goal was to qualify for the 2004 Summer Olympics, but these came to early for Witteveen. After the 2004 Olympics the Europe was replaced by the Laser Radial Witteveen decided to make that change. She became second in the Olympic Sailing Week in Split and at the 2005 European Championship also in Croatia she finished in 14th position. Due to a knee injury at the end of 2005 she was unable to sail in the 2006 season. However, in 2006 she became bachelor of Physics and Astronomy at the University of Amsterdam. She also learned Spanish and she traveled through South America. Witteveen was also a successful rower as she and with her student teammates of Nereus she won the rankings of first year students. She also won silver medals at the Henley Women's Regatta and the Head of the Charles in Boston. Despite the successes in rowing and in the Laser Radial Witteveen decided to sail with Lisa Westerhof in the 470 and aim for qualification for the 2008 Summer Olympics in Beijing. This did not turn out to be a success.

In 2007 a team was formed of nine sailors, (among them were Mandy Mulder, Annemieke Bes, Merel Witteveen, Renée Groeneveld, Marije Faber, Marije Kampen and Brechtje van der Werf), that aimed and qualify for the Olympics in the Yngling. In July 2008 Dutch national coach Maurice Paardekooper selected Witteveen, Mulder and Bes as the trio that would sail the Dutch Yngling team at the 2008 Summer Olympics. The selected team became fourth at the World Championship in Cascais. Furthermore, they became second in Qingdao at the Pre-Olympics, fourth at the European Championship in Warnemünde in 2007. In 2008 there was a third place in the Olympic Class Regatta of Miami And a third place at the Europeans.

== Professional life ==
Witteveen was a Fellow by McKinsey & Company (2012 – 2014) and is currently an MBA student at Stanford Graduate School of Business. Before that she developed, as intern, a Delft3D hydrodynamical model of the California coast for Arcadis (2010).
