= Renee Groeneveld =

Dutch sailor (born 1986)

Renée Groeneveld
Personal information
- Full name: Renée Joanne Groeneveld
- Nationality: Dutch
- Born: 21 September 1986 (age 39) Haarlem
- Height: 1.67 m (5.5 ft)

Sport

Sailing career
- Class(es): Yngling; Elliott 6m
- Club: Haarlemsche Jachtclub, Haarlem
Medal record
European Championships
Silver medal – second place	2009 Middelfart	Yngling
Bronze medal – third place	2008 Blanes	Yngling
- Updated on 13 February 2014

Renée Groeneveld (born 21 September 1986 in Haarlem) is a sailor from the Netherlands. Groeneveld represented her country at the 2012 Summer Olympics in Weymouth. With fellow crew members Annemieke Bes and Marcelien Bos-de Koning, Groeneveld as helmsman took 8th place in the Elliott 6m match race event.

== Sailing career ==
In 2007 a team was formed of nine sailors, among them were Mandy Mulder, Annemieke Bes, Merel Witteveen, Renée Groeneveld, Marije Faber, Marije Kampen and Brechtje van der Werf), that aimed to qualify for the Olympics in the Yngling class. Groeneveld did not maka the 2008 selection but made a comeback for the 2012 Games.
