= Shirley Robertson =

British sailor (born 1968)

Personal information
- Born: 15 July 1968 (age 57) Dundee, Scotland

Sailing career
- Sport: Sailing
- Club: Island Sailing Club
- Class: Europe
Medal record
Shirley Robertson
Medal record
Women's sailing
Representing Great Britain
Olympic Games
Gold medal – first place	2000 Sydney	Europe class
Gold medal – first place	2004 Athens	Yngling class
World Championships
Silver medal – second place	1993 Kaløvig	Europe class
Silver medal – second place	1998 Travemünde	Europe class
Silver medal – second place	2000 Salvador da Bahia	Europe class
Bronze medal – third place	1999 Mornington	Europe class
Bronze medal – third place	2007 Cascals	Yngling class
European Championships
Silver medal – second place	1999 Hayling Island	Europe class

Shirley Ann Robertson, OBE DL (born 15 July 1968) is a British sailor and Olympic gold medallist. She is the first British woman to win Olympic gold medals at consecutive Olympic Games, Sydney 2000 and Athens 2004.

== Early life ==
Robertson was born in Dundee, Scotland, but spent her early life in Menstrie in central Scotland. Robertson began sailing at the age of seven on Loch Ard in Scotland. Her early passion for the sport was nurtured by her family, leading her to compete in local and national events.

== Sailing career ==
Robertson's first major international breakthrough came in the 1998 World Championships, where she won a silver medal in the Europe class. This set the stage for her Olympic debut at the 1996 Atlanta Games, where she competed in the Europe class, finishing in fourth place.

=== Olympic Games ===
Representing Great Britain
Year	Position	Event	Location
1992	9th	Europe class	Barcelona, Spain
1996	4th	Europe class	Savannah, United States
2000	1st	Europe class	Sydney, Australia
2004	1st	Yngling class	Athens, Greece

Robertson made a significant breakthrough during the 2000 Summer Olympics in Sydney, Australia, where she won her first gold medal in the Europe class. This victory marked a significant moment in British sailing history, as it was the first time a British woman had won an Olympic gold in sailing.

Four years later, at the Athens 2004 Olympics, Robertson secured her second gold medal, this time in the Yngling class, alongside crew-mates Sarah Webb and Sarah Ayton. This achievement made her the first British woman to win gold medals at two consecutive Olympic Games.

=== World Championships ===
Pos	Year	Regatta	Event	Class	Location	Notes
8	1987	IYRU World Women's Sailing Championships	Female	ILCA		
18	1990	IYRU World Women's Sailing Championships	Female	Europe class		
36	1992	IYRU World Women's Sailing Championships	Female	Europe class|-		
2nd	1993	Europe World Championships	Female	Europe class	Kaløvig, Denmark	
16	1994	Europe World Championships	Female	Europe class		
13	1995	Europe World Championships	Female	Europe class		
4	1997	Europe World Championships	Female	Europe class		
2nd	1998	Europe World Championships	Female	Europe class	Travemünde, Germany	
3rd	1999	Europe World Championships	Female	Europe class	Mornington, Australia	
2nd	2000	Europe World Championships	Female	Europe class	Salvador da Bahia, Brazil	
14	2001	Yngling World Championship	Open	Yngling		Craig Mitchell (GBR); Samantha Davies (GBR)
16	2002	Yngling World Championship	Female	Yngling		Sarah Ayton (GBR); Inga Leask (GBR)
7	2003	Yngling World Championship	Female	Yngling		Sarah Ayton (GBR); Sarah Webb (GBR)
12	2003	Yngling World Championship	Open	Yngling		Sarah Ayton (GBR); Sarah Webb (GBR)
16	2004	Yngling World Championship	Female	Yngling		Sarah Ayton (GBR); Sarah Webb (GBR)
3rd	2007	Yngling World Championship	Female	Yngling	Cascais, Portugal	Lucy Macgregor (GBR); Annie Lush (GBR)
8th	2008	Yngling World Championship	Female	Yngling		Lucy Macgregor (GBR); Annie Lush (GBR)
5	1999	ISAF Women's Match Racing World Championship	Female	J/22	Genoa, Italy	
4	2000	ISAF Women's Match Racing World Championship	Female	Sonar	St. Petersberg, USA	
4th	2010	Extreme 40 World Championship	Open			

=== Post-Olympic Media Career ===
From 2006 to 2019 she presenter of Mainsail, a monthly CNN program devoted to the sport of sailing. Since 2008 she has been also a commentator for the BBC's sailing coverage at the Summer Olympics, commentating from five Olympic sailing regattas. She also has done a number of events hosting World Sailor of the Year Awards on multiple occasions.

Robertson is also part of the commentary team for the prestigious America's Cup, commentating from Auckland, New Zealand and Barcelona, Spain for the 36th and 37th editions of the world's oldest international sporting trophy.

Robertson was responsible for appointing one of the seven teenagers to light the Olympic cauldron at the opening ceremony of the 2012 Summer Olympics in London. She nominated upcoming youth sailor Callum Airlie. During the games, she became a commentator for the BBC, commentating on the sailing from Weymouth.

In 2019, Robertson launched her own podcast series: Shirley Robertson's Sailing Podcast which sees Robertson sit down for in depth and personal interviews with some of the leading figures from the sport of sailing.

In 2023, she became the godmother of MS Ambition, a cruise ship operated by Ambassador Cruise Line. The first stop on the ship's maiden voyage was from Newcastle to Dundee, Robertson's birth place.

In 2024 Shirley Robertson took up the roll of General Manager of the SuperYacht Racing Association, SYRA. Robertson herself has been racing on the superyacht circuit for over a decade.

== Honours and recognition ==
Robertson was named female World Sailor of the Year by World Sailing in 2000, and was appointed an MBE in 2000 followed by an OBE in 2005 for services to Sailing. She was awarded an honorary MSc by the University of Chichester in 2001.

== Personal life ==
Shirley married Irish businessman Jamie Boag who she has twins Killian and Annabel with. She now lives with her longterm partner, documentary cameraman Tim Butt in Cowes, on the Isle of Wight.
