= 2012–13 ISAF Sailing World Cup =

Event title
- Edition: 5th
- Dates: 2 December 2012 – 27 April 2013
- Yachts: 2.4 Metre, 470, 49er, 49er FX, Finn, Laser, Laser Radial, Nacra 17, RS:X, Sonar

The 2012–13 ISAF Sailing World Cup was a series of sailing regattas staged during 2012–13 season. The series featured boats which feature at the Olympics and Paralympics.

== Regattas ==
2012–13 regattas

Date	Regatta	City	Country
2–8 December 2012	ISAF Sailing World Cup Melbourne	Melbourne	Australia
26 January – 2 February 2013	ISAF Sailing World Cup Miami	Miami	United States
30 March – 6 April 2013	ISAF Sailing World Cup Palma	Palma	Spain
20–27 April 2013	ISAF Sailing World Cup Hyères	Hyères	France

== Results ==
=== 2.4 Metre ===
Regatta	Winner	Country	Ref
Miami	Megan Pascoe	Great Britain	
Palma	Bjørnar Erikstad	Norway	
Hyères	Heiko Kröger	Germany	

=== Men's 470 ===
Regatta	Winners	Country	Ref
Melbourne	Mathew Belcher; Will Ryan	Australia	
Miami	Stuart McNay; David Hughes	United States	
Palma	Mathew Belcher; Will Ryan	Australia	
Hyères	Mathew Belcher; Will Ryan	Australia	

=== Women's 470 ===
Regatta	Winners	Country	Ref
Melbourne	Sasha Ryan; Jaime Ryan	Australia	
Miami	Fernanda Oliveira; Ana Barbachan	Brazil	
Palma	Fernanda Oliveira; Ana Barbachan	Brazil	
Hyères	Fernanda Oliveira; Ana Barbachan	Brazil	

=== Men's 49er ===
Regatta	Winners	Country	Ref
Melbourne	Steven Thomas; Rhys Mara	Australia	
Miami	Frederick Strammer; Zachary Brown	United States	
Palma	Erik Heil; Thomas Ploessel	Germany	
Hyères	Dylan Fletcher-Scott; Alain Sign	Great Britain	

=== Women's 49er FX ===
Regatta	Winners	Country	Ref
Melbourne	Alex Maloney; Molly Meech	New Zealand	
Miami	Martine Grael; Kahena Kunze	Brazil	
Palma	Ida Marie Baad Nielsen; Marie Thusgaard Olsen	Denmark	
Hyères	Alex Maloney; Molly Meech	New Zealand	

=== Men's Finn ===
Regatta	Winner	Country	Ref
Melbourne	Brendan Casey	Australia	
Miami	Caleb Paine	United States	
Palma	Giles Scott	Great Britain	
Hyères	Andrew Mills	Great Britain	

=== Men's Laser ===
Regatta	Winner	Country	Ref
Melbourne	Tom Burton	Australia	
Miami	Jesper Stålheim	Sweden	
Palma	Andy Maloney	New Zealand	
Hyères	Tom Burton	Australia	

=== Women's Laser Radial ===
Regatta	Winner	Country	Ref
Melbourne	Krystal Weir	Australia	
Miami	Paige Railey	United States	
Palma	Alison Young	Great Britain	
Hyères	Marit Bouwmeester	Netherlands	

=== Mixed Nacra 17 ===
Regatta	Winner	Country	Ref
Miami	Sarah Newberry; John Casey	United States	
Palma	Mandy Mulder; Thijs Visser	Netherlands	
Hyères	Tim Shuwalow; Hanna Klinga	Sweden	

=== Men's RS:X ===
Regatta	Winner	Country	Ref
Melbourne	Luke Baillie	Australia	
Miami	Iván Pastor	Spain	
Palma	Ivan Pastor Lafuente	Spain	
Hyères	Przemysław Miarczyński	Poland	

=== Women's RS:X ===
Regatta	Winner	Country	Ref
Miami	Maayan Davidovich	Israel	
Palma	Flavia Tartaglini	Italy	
Hyères	Bryony Shaw	Great Britain	

=== Sonar ===
Regatta	Winners	Country	Ref
Miami	Aleksander Wang-Hansen; Marie Solberg; Per Eugen Kristiansen	Norway	
Hyères	Bruno Jourdren; Nicolas Vimont-Vicary; Eric Flageul	France	
