= Beate Kristiansen =

Norwegian sailor

Personal information
- Nationality: Norwegian
- Born: 22 January 1968 (age 57); Moss, Norway

Sport
- Sport: Sailing
- Club: Moss Seilforening

Beate Kristiansen (born 22 January 1968) is a Norwegian sailor.

== Biography ==
Kristiansen was born in Moss, and has represented Moss Seilforening. She competed at the 2004 Summer Olympics in Athens, where she placed ninth in the Yngling class, together with Karianne Eikeland and Lise Birgitte Fredriksen.
