= Petronella de Jong =

Dutch sailor (born 1970)

Personal information
- Full name: Petronella Catharina de Jong
- Nationality: Dutch
- Born: 26 July 1970 (age 56) Sint Jacobiparochie
- Height: 1.72 m (5.6 ft)

Sailing career
- Sport: Sailing
- Club: Koninklijke Watersportvereniging Sneek
- Class: Yngling
- Updated on 15 February 2014

Petronella Catharina de Jong (born 26 July 1970 in Sint Jacobiparochie) is a sailor from the Netherlands. De Jong represented her country at the 2004 Summer Olympics in Athens. With helmsman Annelies Thies and fellow crew member Annemieke Bes, De Jong took 4th place in the Yngling.
