= Yu Yanli =

Chinese sailor

Personal information
- National team: Team China
- Born: Qingdao, Shandong, China
- Height: 179 cm (5 ft 10 in)
- Weight: 68 kg (150 lb)

Yu Yanli (born March 26, 1980) is a female Chinese sports sailor who competed for Team China at the 2008 Summer Olympics in women's three person keelboat.

== Major performances ==
- 2001/2005 National Games - 5th/1st 470 class
- 2002 National Champions Tournament - 1st 470 class
- 2006 Asian Championships - 2nd 470 class
- 2007 Qingdao International Regatta - 6th Yngling class
