= Peta Lewin =

Bermudian sailor

Personal information
- Nationality: Bermudian
- Born: 26 June 1971 (age 53)

Sport
- Sport: Sailing

Peta Lewin (born 26 June 1971) is a Bermudian sailor. She competed in the Yngling event at the 2004 Summer Olympics.
