= Svitlana Matevusheva =

Ukrainian Olympic sailor (born 1981)

Medal record

Olympic Games

Representing Ukraine

Women's Sailing
Silver medal – second place	2004 Athens	Yngling class

Svitlana Valeriïvna Matevusheva (Ukrainian: Світлана Валеріївна Матевушева; born July 22, 1981, in Sevastopol, Ukrainian SSR) is a Ukrainian sailor. She won the Silver medal in the 2004 Summer Olympics in Athens in the Yngling class along with Ganna Kalinina and Ruslana Taran.
