= Marion Deplanque =

French sailor

Personal information
- Nationality: French
- Born: 1 May 1981 (age 43); Saint-Dizier, France

Sport
- Sport: Sailing

Marion Deplanque (born 1 May 1981) is a French sailor. She competed in the Yngling event at the 2004 Summer Olympics.
