= Deirdre Crampton =

Canadian sailor

Personal information
- Born: 26 March 1976 (age 50) Toronto, Ontario, Canada

Sport
- Sport: Sailing

Deirdre Crampton (born 26 March 1976) is a Canadian sailor. She competed in the Yngling event at the 2004 Summer Olympics.
