= Kristin Wagner =

German sailor

Personal information
- Nationality: German
- Born: 23 February 1971 (age 54); Starnberg, West Germany

Sport
- Sport: Sailing

Kristin Wagner (born 23 February 1971) is a German former sailor. She competed in the Yngling event at the 2004 Summer Olympics.
