= Kylie Jameson =

New Zealand sailor

Personal information
- Born: 9 September 1976 (age 49)

Sport
- Country: New Zealand
- Sport: Sailing

Kylie Jameson (born 9 September 1976) is a New Zealand sailor. She competed at the 2004 Summer Olympics in Athens, in the Yngling class.
