= Liz Filter =

American sailor (born 1965)

Personal information
- Born: March 29, 1965 (age 61) Washington, D.C., United States

Sport
- Sport: Sailing

Liz Filter (born March 29, 1965) is an American sailor. She competed in the Yngling event at the 2004 Summer Olympics.
