= Christine Patton =

Bermudian sailor

Personal information
- Nationality: Bermudian
- Born: 18 March 1960 (age 65)

Sport
- Sport: Sailing

Christine Patton (born 18 March 1960) is a Bermudian sailor. She competed in the Yngling event at the 2004 Summer Olympics.
