= Anna Höll =

German sailor

Personal information
- Nationality: German
- Born: 12 November 1981 (age 43); Munich, West Germany

Sport
- Sport: Sailing

Anna Höll (born 12 November 1981) is a German sailor. She competed in the Yngling event at the 2004 Summer Olympics.
