= Veronika Lochbrunner =

German sailor

Personal information
- Nationality: German
- Born: 2 December 1978 (age 46); Lindau, West Germany

Sport
- Sport: Sailing

Veronika Lochbrunner (born 2 December 1978) is a German former sailor. She competed in the Yngling event at the 2004 Summer Olympics.
