= Helle Jespersen =

Danish sailor

Helle Møller Jespersen (born 12 February 1968) is a Danish competitive sailor and Olympic medalist. She won a bronze medal in the Yngling class at the 2004 Summer Olympics in Athens, together with Dorte Jensen and Christina Otzen.
