= Alessandra Marenzi =

Italian sailor

Personal information
- Nationality: Italian
- Born: 29 October 1981 (age 43); Bergamo, Italy

Sport
- Sport: Sailing

Alessandra Marenzi (born 29 October 1981) is an Italian sailor. She competed in the Yngling event at the 2004 Summer Olympics.
