= Elodie Lesaffre =

French sailor

Personal information
- Nationality: French
- Born: 23 September 1979 (age 45); Nantes, France

Sport
- Sport: Sailing

Elodie Lesaffre (born 23 September 1979) is a French sailor. She competed in the Yngling event at the 2004 Summer Olympics.
