= Tatyana Lartseva =

Russian sailor

Personal information
- Nationality: Russian
- Born: 9 October 1982 (age 42); Dolgoprudny, Russia

Sport
- Sport: Sailing

Tatyana Lartseva (born 9 October 1982) is a Russian sailor. She competed in the Yngling event at the 2004 Summer Olympics.
