= Julia Bleck =

German sailor

Personal information
- Nationality: German
- Born: 6 March 1985 (age 41) Berlin, Germany
- Height: 168 cm (5 ft 6 in)
- Weight: 70 kg (154 lb)

Sailing career
- Sport: Sailing
- Club: Verein Seglerhaus am Wannsee
- Class(es): Yngling, Elliott 6m

Julia Bleck (born 6 March 1985) is a German sailor. She competed in the Yngling event at the 2008 Summer Olympics.
