= Catherine Lepesant =

French sailor

Personal information
- Nationality: French
- Born: 5 February 1972 (age 53); Villemomble, France

Sport
- Sport: Sailing

Catherine Lepesant (born 5 February 1972) is a French sailor. She competed in the Yngling event at the 2008 Summer Olympics.
