= Marcelien de Koning =

Dutch sailor (born 1978)

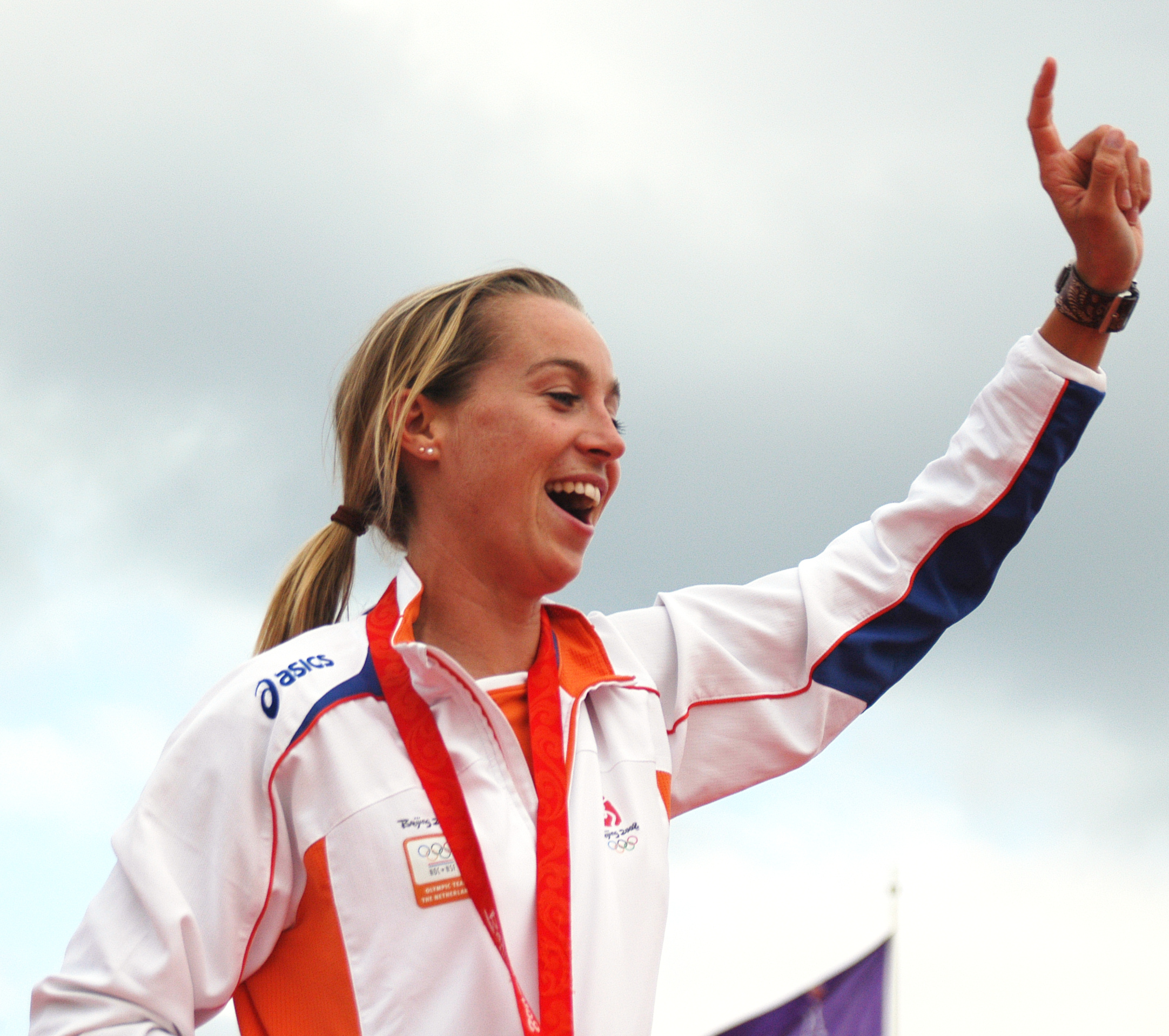
- De Koning in 2008

Personal information
- Full name: Marcelien Bos-de Koning
- Nationality: Dutch
- Born: Marcelien de Koning; 10 May 1978 (age 48) Hoorn, Netherlands
- Height: 1.75 m (5.7 ft)

Sailing career
- Sport: Sailing
- Club: Watersportvereniging Hoorn
- Classes: Europe; 470; Elliott 6m
Medal record
Representing Netherlands
Olympic Games
Silver medal – second place	2008 Beijing	Women's 470
World Championships
Gold medal – first place	2005 San Francisco	Women's 470
Gold medal – first place	2006 Rizhao	Women's 470
Gold medal – first place	2007 Cascais	Women's 470
European Championships
Bronze medal – third place	1997 Greece	Women's Europe
- Updated on 13 February 2014

Marcelien Bos-de Koning (born 10 May 1978) is a Dutch three-time world champion and Olympic silver medalist sports sailor. She represented her country at the 2008 Summer Olympics in Qingdao. With crew member Lobke Berkhout Bos-de Koning took the silver medal as helmsman in the Women's 470. Bos-de Koning returned as crew member to the 2012 Olympic match regatta's in Weymouth in the Elliott 6m. With helmsman Renee Groeneveld and fellow crew member Annemieke Bes Bos-de Koning took 8th place.

== Roles and awards ==
=== Roles within the ISAF ===
Bos-de Koning held the following positions within the International Sailing Federation:

- 2005 until now, Chairmen ISAF Athletes' Commission
- 2009 member of ISAF Equipment working committee
- 2011 member of ISAF 2016 Olympic Format working party

=== Other roles ===
- Ambassador NOC – NSF Beijing 2008,
- Ambassador Earth Water,
- Ambassador Loot school Tabor Hoorn, (youth sport development)

=== Awards ===
- Order of Orange-Nassau

Awards
Preceded by Dutch male relay team 4x100m freestyle (Van den Hoogenband/Kenkhuis/Zastrow/Zwering; 2004)	Sports team of Nederland; 2005; With: Lobke Berkhout	Succeeded by Dutch female field hockey team 2006
