= Mandy Mulder =

Dutch sailor (born 1987)

Personal information
- Nationality: Dutch
- Born: 3 August 1987 (age 39) Poeldijk, Netherlands
- Height: 1.70 m (5 ft 7 in)
- Weight: 61 kg (134 lb)

Sailing career
- Sport: Sailing
- Club: Watersportvereniging Braassemermeer
- Coached by: Maurice Paardekooper
- Classes: Laser Radial; 470; Yngling
Competition record
Representing Netherlands
Olympic Games
Silver medal – second place	2008 Beijing	Yngling
European Championships
Bronze medal – third place	2008	Yngling
- Updated on 13 February 2014

Mandy Mulder (born 3 August 1987 in Poeldijk) is a sailor from the Netherlands. Mulder represented her country at the 2008 Summer Olympics in Qingdao. With fellow crew members Annemieke Bes and Merel Witteveen, Mulder as helmsman took silver medal in the Yngling.

== Sailing career ==
Mulder started sailing in 1995 and competes in international level since 2001. At the European Championship, Optimist, in Gran Canaria she finished on a 10th position. She took part in the 2002 Laser 4.7 World Junior Championship where she won the bronze medal. She won silver at the European Junior Championship Laser Radial in Breitenbrunn. In Madeira during the World Junior Championship in Laser Radial she finished in 13th position.

From 2003 till 2004 Mulder was part of a 470 Female team. In Balatón Mulder finished 7th in the 2003 European Junior Championship and at the World Championship at Lake Garda Mulder finished 9th. Mulder's took another silver at the 2004 Open Dutch Championships. As of 2005 she sails in the yngling and was part of the Dutch national team selection straight away. At the 2005 World Championship in Mondsee Mulder and her team finished 21st. She won bronze medals at the Open Dutch Championships as well as at the Princess Sofia Trophy in Mallorca. After a 12th position at the World Championships in La Rochelle a third in the Holland Regatta in Medemblik and a second at the European Championship in Medemblik Mulder finished first position at the Qingdao 2006 International Regatta.

In 2007 a team was formed of nine sailors, (among them were Mulder, Annemieke Bes, Merel Witteveen, Renée Groeneveld, Marije Faber, Marije Kampen and Brechtje van der Werf), that aimed and qualify for the Olympics in the Yngling. In July 2008 Dutch national coach Maurice Paardekooper selected Witteveen, Mulder and Bes as the trio that would sail the Dutch Yngling team at the 2008 Summer Olympics. The selected team became fourth at the World Championship in Cascais. Furthermore, they became second in Qingdao at the Pre-Olympics, fourth at the European Championship in Warnemünde in 2007. In 2008 there was a third place in the Olympic Class Regatta of Miami And a third place at the Europeans.
