= Chantal Léger =

Canadian sailor

Personal information
- Born: 6 June 1978 (age 48) Senneville, Quebec, Canada

Sport
- Sport: Sailing

Chantal Léger (born 6 June 1978) is a Canadian sailor. She competed in the Yngling event at the 2004 Summer Olympics. Other events she competed in include the 2011 and the 2015 Pan American Games.
