= Carol Cronin =

American sailor (born 1964)

Personal information
- Full name: Carol Newman Cronin
- Nationality: United States
- Born: June 23, 1964 (age 62) Bethesda, Maryland
- Height: 5 ft 1.5 in (156 cm)
- Weight: 130 lb (59 kg)

Sport

Sailing career
- Class(es): Yngling, Snipe
- Club: Severn Sailing Association
- College team: Connecticut College
Medal record
Sailing
Representing United States
World Championships
Bronze medal – third place	2004 Santander	Yngling
Gold medal – first place	2018 Newport	Snipe

Carol Newman Cronin (born June 23, 1964) is an American Olympic sailor and author who competed in the Yngling class at the 2004 Summer Olympics. She won the 2018 Women's Snipe World Championship and was third at the 2004 Women's Yngling World Championship. She also won the 2002 US Sailing's Miami Olympic Classes Regatta in the Yngling class. As tactician, she won the 1999 Rolex International Women's Keelboat Championship sailing with Pat Connerney.

Her novels include: Oliver's Surprise: A Boy, a Schooner, and the Great Hurricane of 1938 (GemmaMedia, 2008); Cape Cod Surprise: Oliver Matches wits with Hurricane Carol (GemmaMedia, 2010); Game of Sails, an Olympic Love Story (LiveWire, 2012); and Ferry to Cooperation Island (She Writes Press, 2020).

She is also the author of 100 Years of Gold Stars, a history of the Star World Championship.

== Early life ==
Cronin grew up sailing with her family and racing out of the Woods Hole Yacht Club and was on the first Connecticut College Sailing Team to attend the Inter-Collegiate Sailing Association National Championships. After graduation, she crewed for Ed Adams, George Szabo, and many other prominent sailors.

== Olympic career ==
In 2000, Cronin put together a team to compete for the 2004 Summer Olympics. Four years later, her team beat out five other boats at the USA Olympic Trials and won a bronze medal at the 2004 Women's Yngling World Championship. They won two races in Athens and finished tenth overall.
