= Pippa Wilson =

English sailor (born 1986)

Olympic medal record

Representing Great Britain

Women's Sailing
Gold medal – first place	2008 Beijing	Yngling class

World Championships
Gold medal – first place	2024	SB20
Gold medal – first place	2007 Cascais	Yngling
Gold medal – first place	2008 Miami	Yngling

European Championships
Gold medal – first place	2008 Blanes	Yngling

Philippa Claire Wilson MBE (born 7 February 1986 in Southampton) is an English professional sailor. She started her sailing career in the youth class dinghy, Cadet, then progressed to the 29er, 420, 470 then Yngling, in which she won an Olympic gold medal in 2008. Based in Dubai, she teaches dinghy sailing, and is Executive Director of the 29er Class Association.

== 2008 Olympic Games ==
Wilson won a gold medal in the Yngling sailing class in the 2008 Summer Olympics in Beijing, together with Sarah Webb and Sarah Ayton.

== Honour ==
Wilson was appointed Member of the Order of the British Empire (MBE) in the 2009 New Year Honours.

== Post-competitive career ==
She was awarded an honorary MSc by the University of Chichester in 2009. In 2024 she was a judge of the World Sailing Awards. She is (under her married name, Pippa Kenton-Page) based in Dubai where she teaches dinghy sailing, and in 2024 she was appointed Executive Director of the 29er Class Association.
