= Angela Baroni =

Italian sailor

Personal information
- Nationality: Italian
- Born: 24 March 1979 (age 45); Rovereto, Italy

Sport
- Sport: Sailing

Angela Baroni (born 24 March 1979) is an Italian sailor. She competed in the Yngling event at the 2004 Summer Olympics.
