= Ulrike Schümann =

German sailor

Personal information
- Nickname: Ulli
- Nationality: German
- Born: 30 January 1973 (age 53) Potsdam, East Germany
- Height: 163 cm (5 ft 4 in)
- Weight: 62 kg (137 lb)

Sailing career
- Sport: Sailing
- Class: Yngling
Medal record
World Championships
Silver medal – second place	2003 Cádiz	Yngling, women

Ulrike Schümann (also spelled Schuemann, born 30 January 1973) is a German sailor. She competed in the Yngling event at the 2008 Summer Olympics.
