= Marina Sánchez =

Spanish sailor

Personal information
- Nationality: Spanish
- Born: 9 January 1977 (age 48)

Sport
- Sport: Sailing

Marina Sánchez (born 9 January 1977) is a Spanish sailor. She competed in the Yngling event at the 2004 Summer Olympics.
