= Katerina Giakoumidou =

Greek sailor

Personal information
- Nationality: Greek
- Born: 21 June 1977 (age 47); Athens, Greece

Sport
- Sport: Sailing

Katerina Giakoumidou (born 21 June 1977) is a Greek sailor. She competed in the Yngling event at the 2004 Summer Olympics.
