= Ganna Kalinina =

Ukrainian Olympic sailor (born 1979)

Medal record

Olympic Games

Representing Ukraine

Women's Sailing
Silver medal – second place	2004 Athens	Yngling class

Ganna Heorhiïvna Kalinina (also spelt Hanna) (Ukrainian: Ганна Георгіївна Калініна; born May 1, 1979, in Kiev, Ukrainian SSR) is a Ukrainian sailor. She won the Silver medal in the 2004 Summer Olympics in Athens in the Yngling class along with Svitlana Matevusheva and Ruslana Taran.
