= Virginia Kravarioti =

Greek sailor

Medal record

Women's sailing

Representing Greece

Olympic Games
Bronze medal – third place	2008 Beijing	Yngling class

Virginia Kravarioti (Greek: Βιργινία Κραβαριώτη; born April 27, 1984, in Athens) is a Greek sailor. She won the bronze medal in the women's Yngling class with Sofia Bekatorou and Sofia Papadopoulou at the 2008 Summer Olympics in Beijing, People's Republic of China.
