= Carrie Howe =

American sailor (born 1981)

Personal information
- Born: May 13, 1981 (age 44) Grosse Pointe, Michigan, United States

Sport
- Sport: Sailing

Carrie Howe (born May 13, 1981) is an American sailor. She competed in the Yngling event at the 2008 Summer Olympics.
