= Sarah Ayton =

British sailor (born 1980)

Sarah Ayton OBE
Personal information
- Born: 9 April 1980 (age 46) Ashford, Surrey, England
Medal record
Sailing
Representing Great Britain
Olympic Games
Gold medal – first place	2004 Athens	Yngling class
Gold medal – first place	2008 Beijing	Yngling class
World Championships
Gold medal – first place	2007 Cascais	Yngling
Gold medal – first place	2008 Miami	Yngling
European Championships
Gold medal – first place	2008 Blanes	Yngling

Sarah Lianne Ayton OBE (born 9 April 1980 in Ashford, Middlesex ) is an English former professional sailor.

She won a gold medal in the Yngling sailing class in the 2004 Summer Olympics in Athens, together with Shirley Robertson and Sarah Webb, and another gold medal in the Yngling sailing class in the 2008 Summer Olympics in Beijing, together with Pippa Wilson and Sarah Webb.

She retired from competitive sailing in 2011, citing the competing demands of motherhood.

In 2015 Ayton was the winner of the Female World Sailor of the Year Awards – "the highest award a sailor can receive in recognition of their outstanding achievements in the world of sailing".

Having been appointed a Member of the Order of the British Empire (MBE) in the 2005 New Year Honours, Ayton was promoted to Officer of the Order of the British Empire (OBE) in the 2009 New Year Honours. She was awarded an honorary MSc by the University of Chichester in 2009.She is divorced from windsurfer Nick Dempsey. Together, they have two sons Thomas-Flynn, who was born on 28 June 2009 and Oscar-Flynn George who was born on 7 March 2012. Sarah married Ashley Harris 12 February 2022

Ayton is a patron of Meningitis UK. Ayton battled with meningococcal meningitis and septicaemia in 1995, when she was aged 14. In 2015 she visited Bosham sailing club, to present prizes at the racing prizegiving.

She retains an active interest in sport, including amateur horse racing.
