= Kristen Kosmala =

Australian sailor

Personal information
- Born: 9 January 1968 (age 58) Rabaul, East New Britain, Papua New Guinea
- Height: 168 cm (5 ft 6 in)

Sport
- Country: Australia

Sailing career
- Club: Middle Harbour Yacht Club

Kristen Kosmala (born 9 February 1968) is an Australian sailor who represented Australia at the 2004 Athens Olympics.

Kosmala competed in the three-person keelboat (Yngling) event with skipper Nicky Bethwaite and fellow crew Karyn Gojnich. Their best performance was a second in race 8 and they finished thirteenth overall.

In March 2005 Yachting NSW appointed Kosmala coaching and programs manager.

Kosmala won the NSW open apprentice masters radial laser and women's radial laser events in 2005/2006. She then finished 2nd in the 2006/2007 open apprentice masters radial laser event and 2nd in the open women's radial laser event in 2007/2008.
