= Joanna White =

New Zealand sailor

Personal information
- Born: 2 November 1978 (age 47)

Sport
- Country: New Zealand
- Sport: Sailing

Joanna White (born 2 November 1978) is a New Zealand sailor. She competed at the 2004 Summer Olympics in Athens, in the Yngling class.
