= Sharon Gerecht =

Israeli biomedical engineer

Sharon Gerecht (Hebrew: שרון גרכט) is an Israeli American bioengineer. She is a professor of chemical and biomolecular engineering at the Whiting School of Engineering. Gerecht is the Kent Gordon Croft Investment Management Faculty scholar and director of the Johns Hopkins Institute of NanoBioTechnology (INBT). She holds a joint appointment in Oncology at the Johns Hopkins School of Medicine and in Materials Science and Engineering and Biomedical Engineering. She will be moving to Duke University in 2022. In 2011, she won a National Science Foundation CAREER Award. She was elected a fellow of the American Institute for Medical and Biological Engineering in 2016 and a member of the National Academy of Medicine in 2019. Gerecht completed a B.A. in biology at Technion – Israel Institute of Technology in 1994. She earned a M.Sc. in medical sciences at Tel Aviv University in 1999 and a Ph.D. in biotechnology engineering at Technion in 2004. She was a postdoctoral researcher at Massachusetts Institute of Technology.
