= Sofia Papadopoulou =

Greek sailor

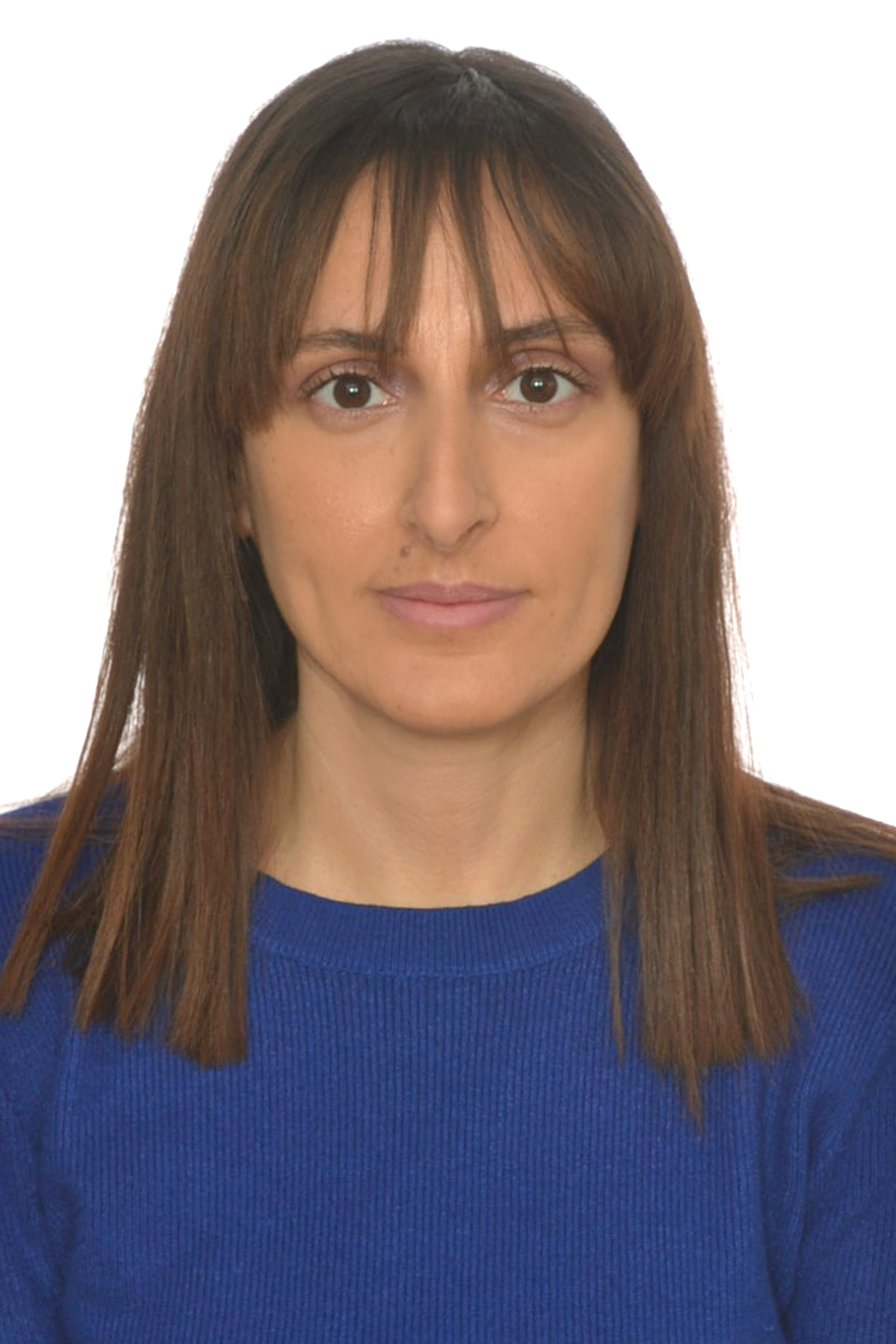
- Papadopoulou in 2021

Medal record

Women's sailing

Representing Greece

Olympic Games
Bronze medal – third place	2008 Beijing	Yngling class

Yngling European Championship
Bronze medal – third place	2007 Warnemunder	Yngling class

420 World Championship
Silver medal – second place	2002 Tavira	420 class

Sofia Papadopoulou (Greek: Σοφία Παπαδοπούλου, born 19 November 1983 in Athens) is a Greek sailor. She started sailing at the age of 5. She won the bronze medal in the women's Yngling class with Sofia Bekatorou and Virginia Kravarioti at the 2008 Summer Olympics in Beijing, People's Republic of China.
