= Sarah Webb (sailor) =

British sailor (born 1977)

Medal record

Women's Sailing

Representing Great Britain

Olympic Games
| Gold medal – first place | 2004 Athens | Yngling class |
| Gold medal – first place | 2008 Beijing | Yngling class |

World Championships
| Gold medal – first place | 2007 Cascais | Yngling |
| Gold medal – first place | 2008 Miami | Yngling |

European Championships
| Gold medal – first place | 2008 Blanes | Yngling |

Sarah Kathleen Gosling OBE (née Webb; born 13 January 1977 in Ashford, Surrey) is a British professional sailor and twice Olympic gold medalist.

== Sailing career ==
Webb joined the Royal Yachting Association's youth squad and competed in the Laser Radial class in the ISAF Youth World Championships in 1995 and 1996.

She won a gold medal in the Yngling sailing class in the 2004 Summer Olympics in Athens, Greece, together with Shirley Robertson and Sarah Ayton, collectively nicknamed "Three Blondes in a Boat." She repeated this success in the 2008 Summer Olympics in Beijing, China, together with Pippa Wilson and Sarah Ayton.

In early 2007, Webb appeared on and won BBC cookery programme Ready Steady Cook against fellow Olympic medallist Nick Rogers.

Already a Member of the Order of the British Empire (MBE), she was appointed Officer of the Order of the British Empire (OBE) in the 2009 New Year Honours. She was awarded an honorary MSc by the University of Chichester in 2009.

She married multi-millionaire Adam Gosling, a son of the former car park tycoon Sir Donald Gosling in 2009. They have a son.
