= Alexandra Koefoed =

Norwegian sailor

Personal information
- Nationality: Norwegian
- Born: 25 March 1978 (age 48) Oslo, Norway

Sport
- Sport: Sailing
- Club: Royal Norwegian Yacht Club

Alexandra Vaksvik Koefoed (born 25 March 1978) is a Norwegian sailor. She was born in Oslo, and has represented the Royal Norwegian Yacht Club. She competed at the 2008 Summer Olympics, where she placed ninth in the Yngling class, together with Siren Sundby and Lise Birgitte Fredriksen.
