= Martha Henderson =

Canadian sailor

Personal information
- Born: 24 April 1968 (age 58) Toronto, Ontario, Canada

Sport
- Sport: Sailing

Martha Henderson (born 24 April 1968) is a Canadian sailor. She competed in the Yngling event at the 2008 Summer Olympics.
