= Julie Gerecht =

French sailor

Personal information
- Nationality: French
- Born: 28 November 1979 (age 46) Paris, France

Sport
- Sport: Sailing

Julie Gerecht (born 28 November 1979) is a French sailor. She competed in the Yngling event at the 2008 Summer Olympics.
