= Nancy Haberland =

American sailor

Personal information
- Nationality: American
- Born: August 16, 1960 (age 65) Evanston, Illinois, United States

Sport
- Sport: Sailing

Nancy Haberland (born August 16, 1960) is an American sailor. She competed in the Yngling event at the 2004 Summer Olympics.
