= Christina Otzen =

Danish sailor

Olympic medal record

Women's sailing
Bronze medal – third place	2004 Athens	Yngling

Christina Otzen (born 4 October 1975 in Gentofte, Denmark) is an international sailor. She won a bronze medal in the Yngling class in the 2004 Summer Olympics.
