= Jen Provan =

Canadian sailor

Personal information
- Born: 3 June 1978 (age 48) Toronto, Ontario, Canada

Sport
- Sport: Sailing

Jen Provan (born 3 June 1978) is a Canadian sailor. She competed at the 2004 Summer Olympics and the 2008 Summer Olympics.
