= Qingdao International Sailing Centre =

Sailing venue in Qingdao, China

Coordinates: 36°3′25″N 120°23′10″E

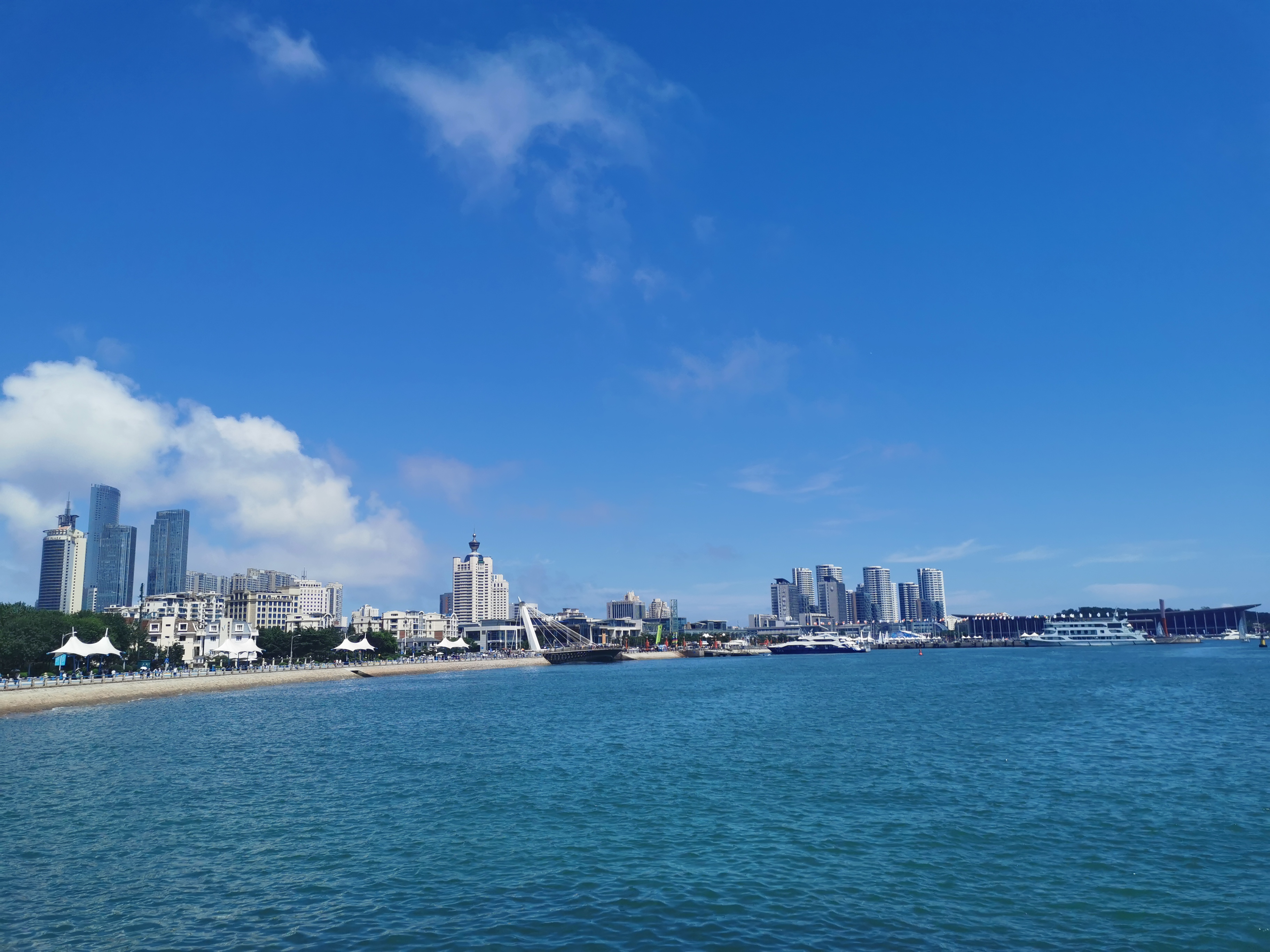
Qingdao International Sailing Centre, 2021

The Qingdao International Sailing Centre (simplified Chinese: 青岛奥林匹克帆船中心; traditional Chinese: 青島奧林匹克帆船中心; pinyin: Qīngdǎo Àolínpǐkè Fānchuán Zhōngxīn) is a sailing center located in Qingdao, China with events taking place on the Yellow Sea. It was built to host sailing events at the 2008 Summer Olympics and Paralympics, with construction beginning in 2004.

Since the Olympics in 2008, it has acted as a stopover port for both the Volvo Ocean Race and the Clipper Race, as well has hosting World Championships and ISAF Sailing World Cup events between the 2013–14 and 2016 seasons.

== History ==
Beijing won the bidding process to host the 2008 Summer Olympics in 2001. Three years later, in 2004, construction of the Qingdao International Sailing Centre began, with the venue being completed in 2006. Also in 2006, the venue hosted its first international event with the 2006 Qingdao International Regatta being held as part of the Good Luck Beijing test event.

In the leadup to the Olympics, the IFDS Qingdao Regatta was hosted in 2008 by Qingdao International Sailing Centre as a test event for the three Paralympic sailing events.

During the 2008 Olympic Games, the Qingdao International Sailing Centre hosted eleven events across nine windsurfing, dinghy, skiff and keelboat classes, totaling 400 competitors. At that year's Paralympics 80 competitors took part across three different classes of keelboat.

Qingdao acted as a stopover during the 2008–2009 Volvo Ocean Race, and the Clipper Round the World Race every year since 2005–06.

Qingdao International Sailing Centre has also hosted other sailing world championships, such as the 2025 ILCA 7 and ILCA 6 World Championships, as well as several Sailing World Cup events throughout the 2010s.

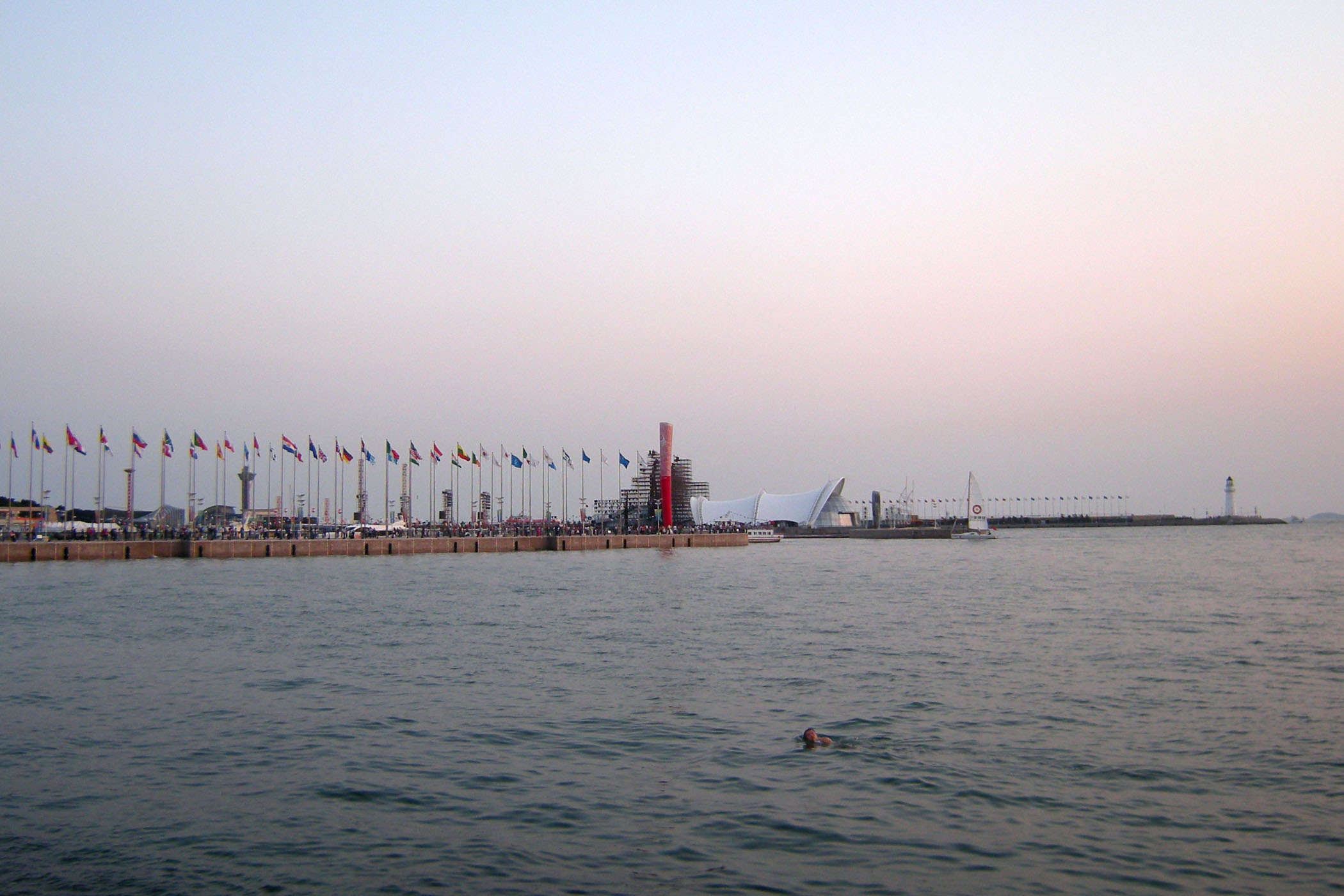
Qingdao International Sailing Centre

== Facilities ==
The Qingdao Olympic Sailing Center covers 45 hectares, comprising a 30-hectare competition area and a 15-hectare area for development after the Games. The site is also home to Yandaoshan Park, the Olympic Sailing Museum and the Qingdao International Conference Center.
