= Katie Abbott =

Canadian sailor

Personal information
- Born: 8 December 1986 (age 39) Sarnia, Ontario, Canada
- Height: 1.64 m (5 ft 5 in)
- Weight: 63 kg (139 lb)

Sport
- Sport: Sailing

Kathryn Abbott (born 8 December 1986) is a Canadian sailor. She competed in the 2008 Summer Olympics.
