= Nicky Bethwaite =

Australian sailor (born 1955)

Nicola Green (née Bethwaite, born 12 May 1955 in Auckland) is an Australian sailor. She competed for Australia at two Olympic Games, in 1988 in the Women's Two Person Dinghy (470) and in 2004 in the three-person Yngling class.

She is the daughter of pilot, yachtsman, yacht designer and meteorologist Frank Bethwaite and the sister of fellow Olympian Mark Bethwaite.
