= Lise Birgitte Fredriksen =

Norwegian sailor

Personal information
- Born: 24 October 1979 (age 46) Bærum, Norway

Sport
- Sport: Sailing

Lise Birgitte Vaksdal Fredriksen (born 24 October 1979) is a Norwegian sailor.

She was born in Bærum, and has represented Asker Seilforening and KNS. She competed at the 2004 and 2008 Summer Olympics. In 2008, she placed ninth in the Yngling class, together with Siren Sundby and Alexandra Koefoed.
