= Graciela Pisonero =

Spanish sailor

Personal information
- Full name: Graciela Pisonero Castro
- Nationality: Spanish
- Born: 3 August 1982 (age 42); Gijón, Spain

Sport
- Sport: Sailing

Graciela Pisonero Castro (Note: In this Spanish name, the first or paternal surname is Pisonero and the second or maternal family name is Castro.) (born 3 August 1982) is a Spanish sailor. She competed at the 2004 Summer Olympics and the 2008 Summer Olympics.
