= Mónica Azón =

Spanish sailor

Personal information
- Nationality: Spanish
- Born: 19 October 1972 (age 52); Barcelona, Spain

Sport
- Sport: Sailing

Mónica Azón (born 19 October 1972) is a Spanish sailor. She competed at the 2004 Summer Olympics and the 2008 Summer Olympics.
