= Yngling (keelboat) =

Sailboat class

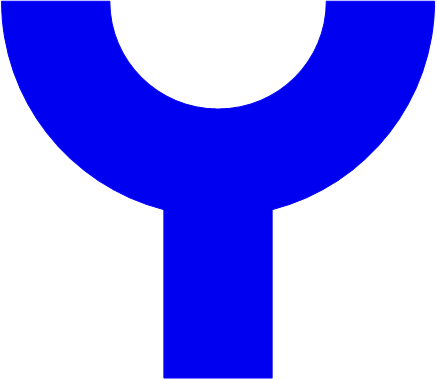

Development
- Designer: Jan Herman Linge
- Location: Norway
- Year: 1967
- No. built: 4,500
- Builders: O'Day Corp. Abbott Boats; Børresen Bådebyggeri; Mader Bootswerft; Jibetech; Petticrows
- Name: Yngling

Boat
- Displacement: 1,323 lb (600 kg)
- Draft: 3.44 ft (1.05 m)

Hull
- Type: monohull
- Construction: fibreglass
- LOA: 20.83 ft (6.35 m)
- LWL: 15.42 ft (4.70 m)
- Beam: 5.67 ft (1.73 m)

Hull appendages
- Keel: swept fin keel
- Ballast: 683 lb (310 kg)
- Rudder: internally-mounted spade-type rudder

Rig
- Rig type: Bermuda rig
- I foretriangle height: 18.70 ft (5.70 m)
- J foretriangle base: 6.56 ft (2.00 m)
- P mainsail luff: 22.31 ft (6.80 m)
- E mainsail foot: 8.53 ft (2.60 m)

Sails
- Sailplan: fractional rigged sloop
- Mainsail area: 95.15 sq ft (8.840 m^{2})
- Jib/genoa area: 61.34 sq ft (5.699 m^{2})
- Spinnaker area: 180 sq ft (17 m^{2})
- Total sail area: 156.49 sq ft (14.538 m^{2})

The Yngling is a sailboat that was designed by Norwegian Jan Herman Linge as a one design racer and first built in 1967.

The Yngling design is very similar to the larger 1966 Linge-designed Soling.

== Production ==
In the past the design was built by Abbott Boats in Canada, the O'Day Corp. and Jibetech in the United States as well as Petticrows in the United Kingdom. It remains in production at Børresen Bådebyggeri in Denmark and by Mader Bootswerft in Germany.

== Design ==
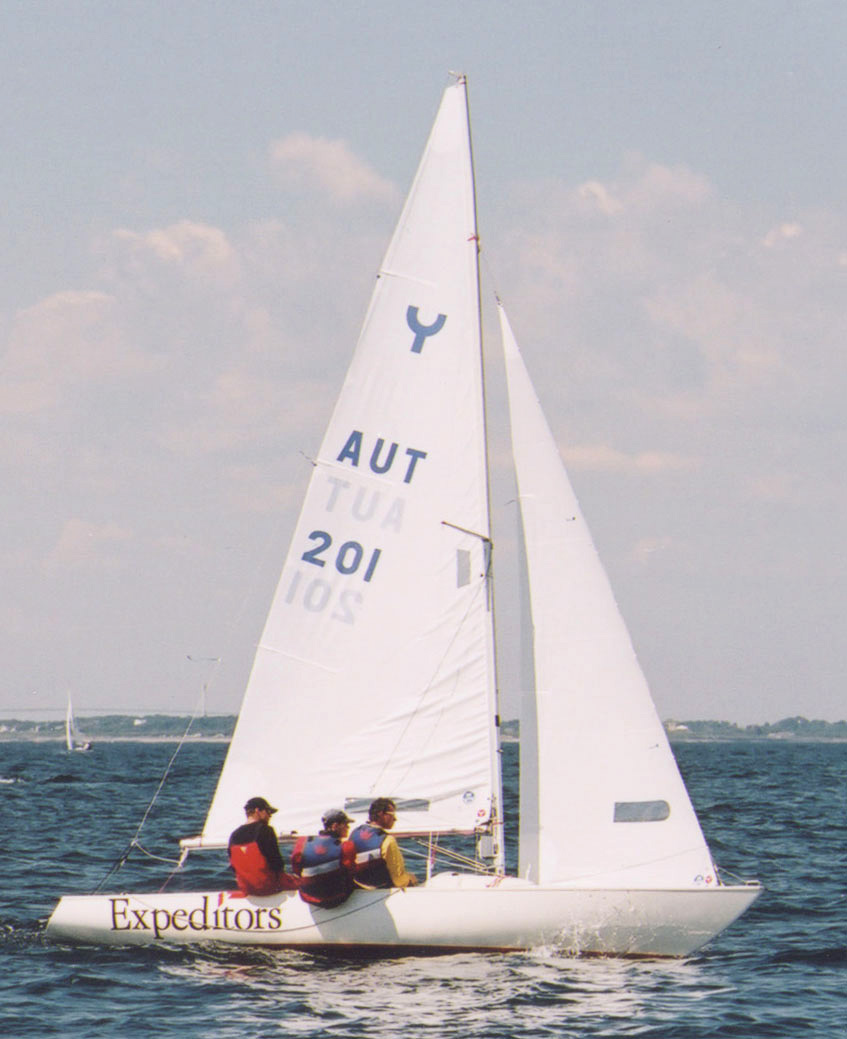
Yngling

The Yngling is a racing keelboat, built predominantly of fibreglass, with wood trim. It has a fractional sloop rig with aluminium spars. The hull has a spooned raked stem, a raised counter reverse transom, an internally mounted spade-type rudder controlled by a tiller and a swept fixed fin keel. It displaces 1,323 lb (600 kg) and carries 683 lb (310 kg) of lead ballast.

The boat has a draft of 3.44 ft (1.05 m) with the standard keel.

The design has a small cuddy cabin for stowage.

For sailing the design is equipped with a 180 sq ft (17 m^{2}) spinnaker, an end-boom mainsheet, foam buoyancy and sail windows for visibility.

== Operational history ==
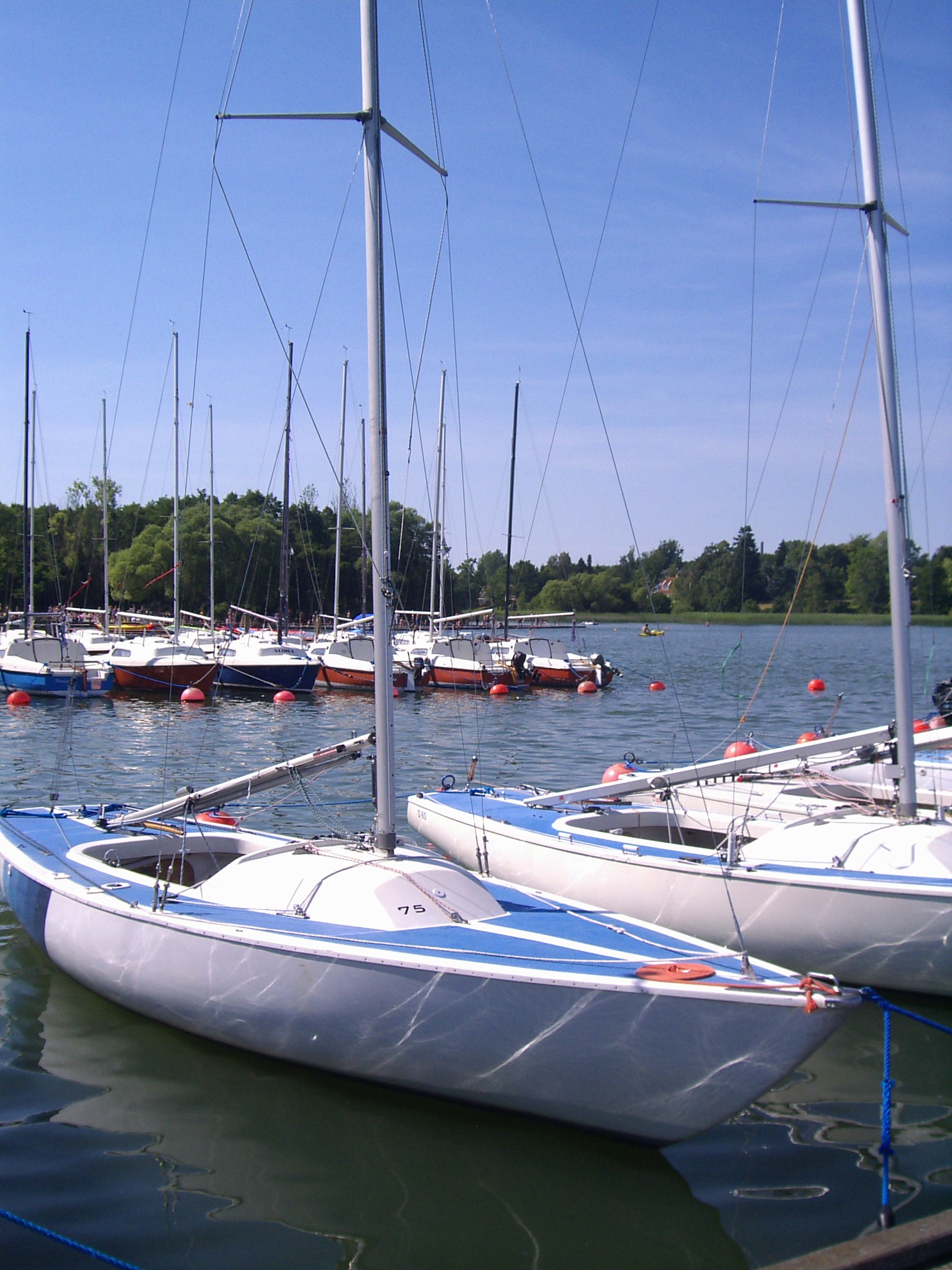
A moored Yngling showing the hull shape and cuddy cabin

The design is supported by a class club, the International Yngling Association, with national clubs in Austria, Belgium, Germany, Norway, Switzerland, Denmark, the Netherlands, Sweden, the United States and Australia.

The Yngling received ISAF International status in 1979 and was chosen as the Olympic Women's Keelboat for the 2004 and the 2008 Summer Olympics. The Yngling was replaced by the Elliott 6m for the London 2012 Summer Olympics.

In a 1994 review Richard Sherwood wrote, "Jan Linge also designed the larger Soling, and the lines are very similar ... The Yngling is highly stable, with a beam-to-waterline ratio of .37 and with 50 percent of the weight in ballast. It is unsinkable, with foam-filled tanks. Sail area is not large, so that the boat may be sailed by younger sailors. While one-design rules are strict, every effort has been made to keep the cost of allowable modifications down."

== Events ==
- Yngling World Championship
- Sailing at the 2004 Summer Olympics – Yngling
- Sailing at the 2008 Summer Olympics – Yngling

== See also ==
- List of sailing boat types
- Soling
