= Sailing at the 2012 Summer Olympics =

Sailing at the Games of the XXX Olympiad
- Venues: Weymouth and Portland National Sailing Academy
- Dates: 29 July – 11 August 2012
- No. of events: 10
- Competitors: 380 from 63 nations

Sailing/Yachting is an Olympic sport starting from the Games of the 1st Olympiad (1896 Olympics in Athens, Greece). With the exception of 1904 and possibly the cancelled 1916 Summer Olympics, sailing has always been included on the Olympic schedule. Sailing at the 2012 Summer Olympics in London was held 29 July – 11 August 2012 at Weymouth and Portland National Sailing Academy in Weymouth. The 2012 sailing program consisted of a total of ten events (eight classes). Eleven fleet races were scheduled off the coast at Weymouth Bay for each event, except for the 49er and the Elliott 6m classes. For the 49er class, a total of 16 races were scheduled. Of the 11 (16) races, 10 (15) were scheduled as opening races and the last one as medal race. For the Elliott 6m a series of match races was scheduled. The sailing was done on different types of courses.

== Venue ==
Weymouth and Portland National Sailing Academy
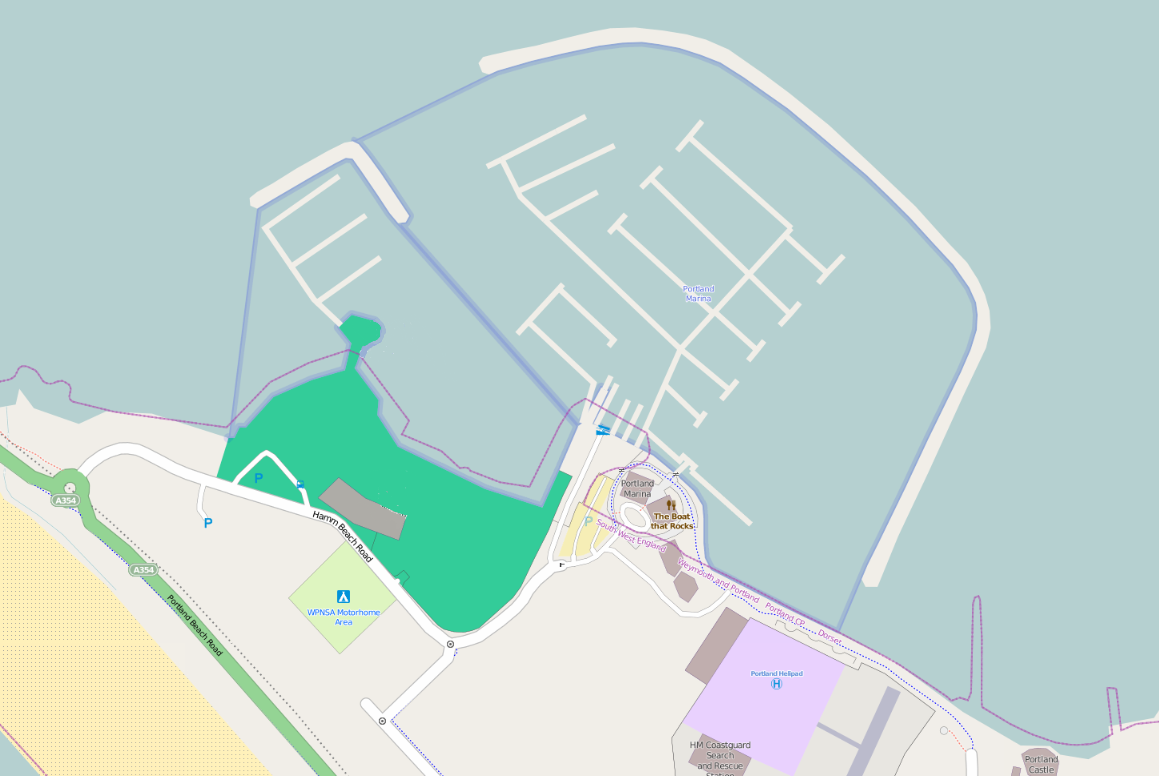
- Weymouth and Portland National Sailing Academy

General information
- Status: Completed
- Location: Osprey Quay, Portland,, Dorset DT5 1SA
- Coordinates: 50°34′19″N 2°27′21″W
- Elevation: Sealevel
- Opened: 2008
- Inaugurated: Improvements to the Weymouth & Portland National Sailing Academy were ready for competition by 2008. The new slipway, moorings and other facilities have already been used for several international events.
- Client: LOCOG
- Owner: Weymouth and Portland National Sailing Academy

Other information
- Seating type: Standing
- Seating capacity: 17,400

According to the IOC statutes the contests in all sport disciplines must be held either in, or as close as possible to the city which the IOC has chosen. Among others, an exception is made for the Olympic sailing events, which customarily must be staged on the open sea. On account of this principle, Weymouth and Portland was selected for the honor to carry out the Olympic yachting regattas. For that purpose the Weymouth and Portland National Sailing Academy was reconstructed.

=== Weymouth and Portland National Sailing Academy (WPNSA) ===
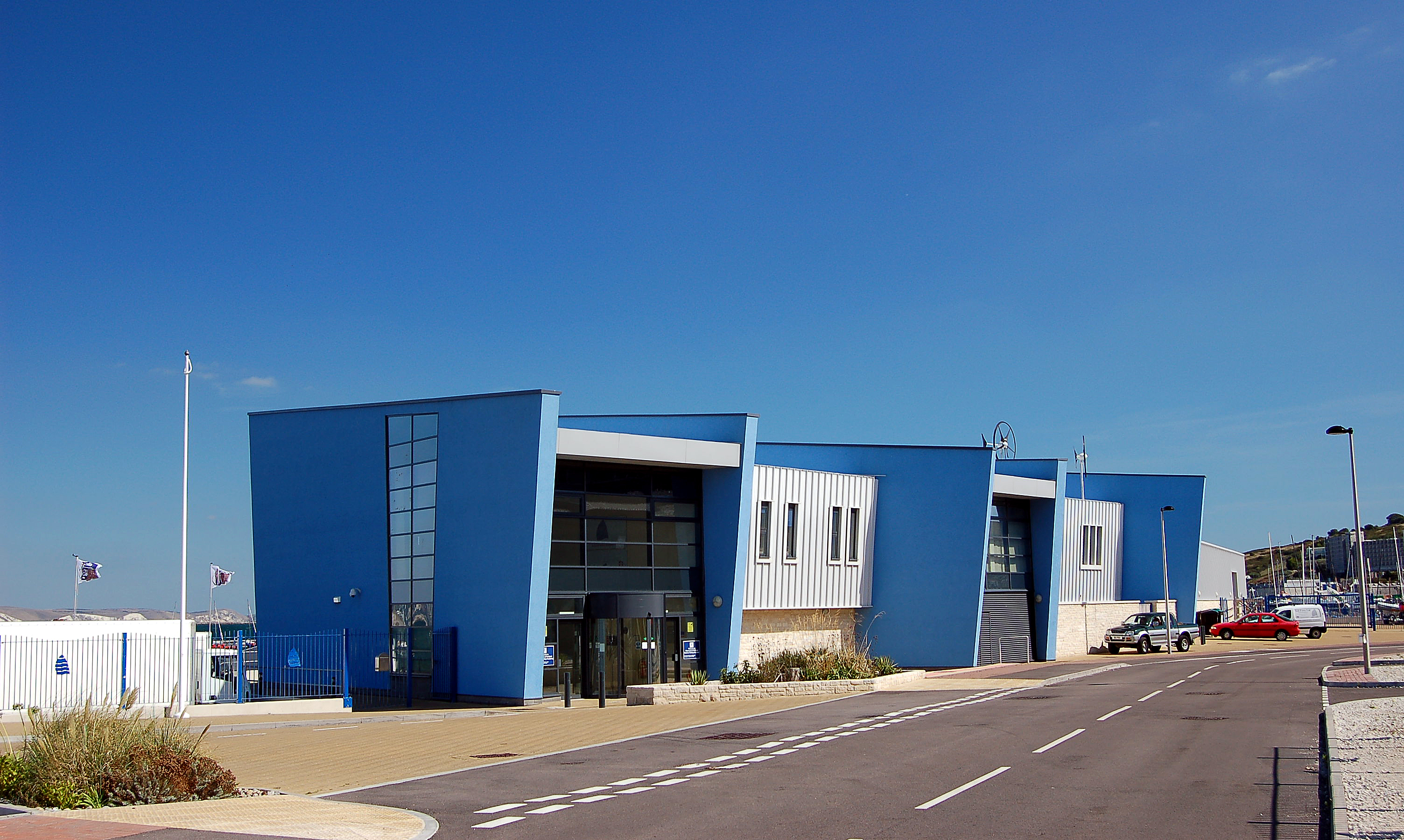

The land based part of the WPNSA includes:

- Administrative and game management center
- Media center
- The "Hangar" for measurement, social events and logistic center.
- (Inter)National sailing center
- Craning, mooring and slipway facilities

=== Course areas ===
A total of five race areas were set on Weymouth Bay of the coast of the Weymouth and Portland National Sailing Academy. The exclusion area was limited by a fictive line between Portland and the mainland. All racing took place within this exclusion zone. The five course areas were positioned according to the table below the map but could be moved anywhere within the exclusion zone.

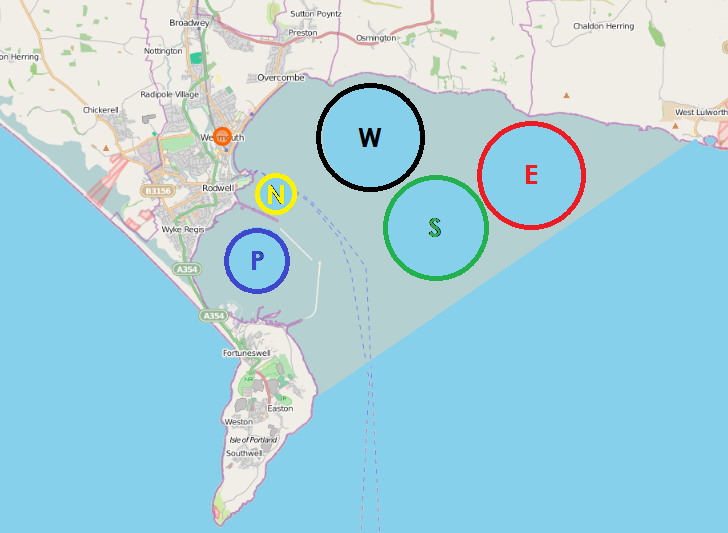
Olympic Course Areas 2012. Portland Harbour ( (P):) 50° 35.19’ N, 02° 26.54’ W Nothe Harbour ( (N):) 50° 36.18’ N 02° 25.98’ W Weymouth Bay West ( (W):) 50° 37.18’ N 02° 23.55’ W Weymouth Bay South ( (S):) 50° 35.71’ N 02° 22.08’ W Weymouth Bay East ( (E):) 50° 36.58’ N 02° 19.70’ W

== Competition ==
=== Qualification ===
Fifty-seven nations qualified for the sailing events and a further six were allocated places not taken up by qualified nations to give a total of 63 nations participating. The only countries to have qualified in all events were France, New Zealand, the US and the hosts, Great Britain; New Zealand declined to take up their place in the Women's RS-X.

=== Overview ===
Continents	Countries	Classes	Boats	Male	Female
6	63	10	273	237	143

=== Continents ===
- Africa
- Asia
- Oceania
- Europe
- North America
- South America

=== Countries ===
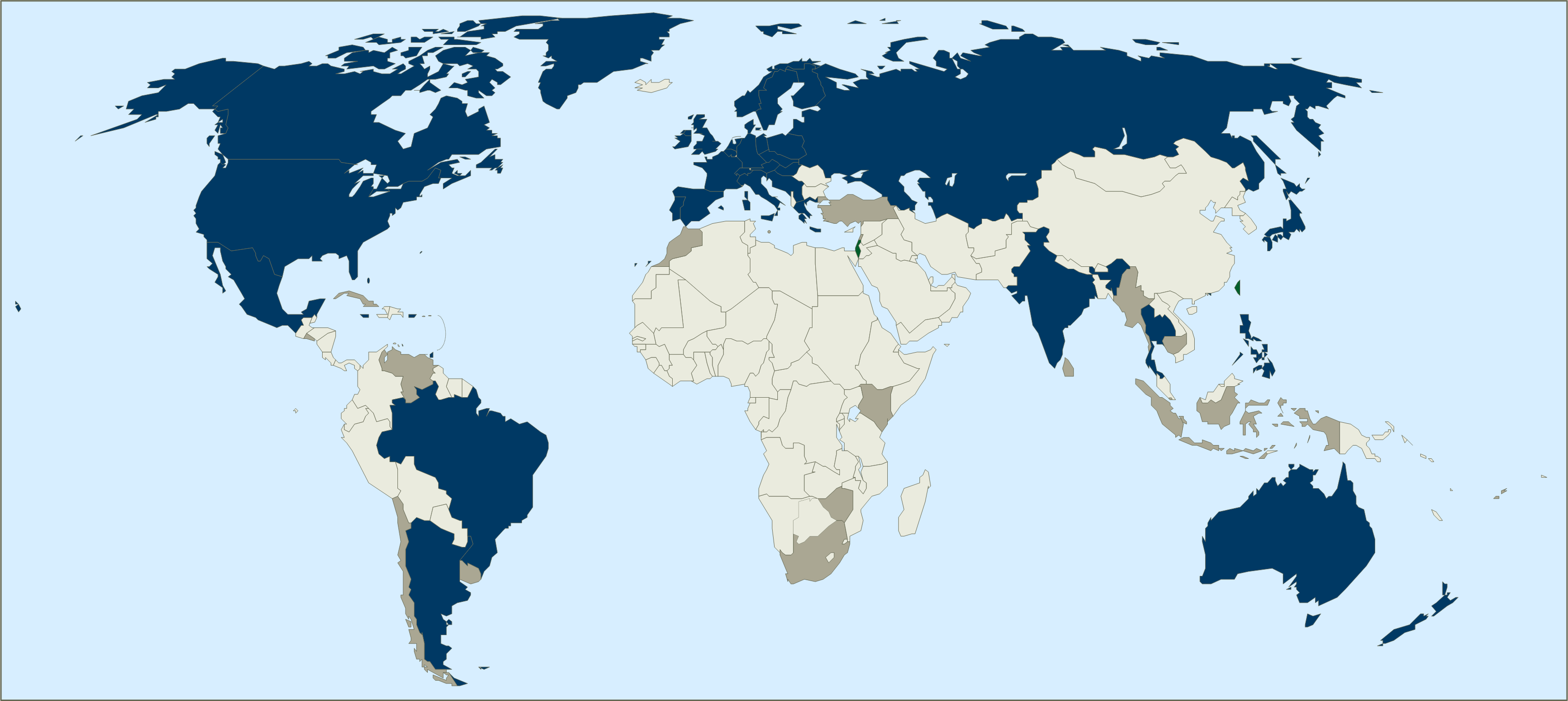
Countries that participated in the Sailing event of the 2012 Olympic Games. Blue: Water Gray: Never participated in OG Dark Gray: Participated in earlier OG Green: Country participated for the first time Dark Blue: Country participated also on previous games Red: Country boycotted the sailing event of the OG

Argentina	Australia	Austria	Belgium
Bermuda	Belarus	Brazil	Bulgaria
Canada	Chile	China	Cook Islands
Colombia	Croatia	Cyprus	Czech Republic
Denmark	Egypt	Spain	Estonia
Finland	France	Great Britain	Germany
Greece	Guatemala	Hong Kong	Hungary
Independent Olympic Athletes	Ireland	Israel	Virgin Islands
Italy	Japan	Kyrgyzstan	South Korea
Saint Lucia	Lithuania	Malaysia	Mexico
Montenegro	Monaco	Netherlands	Norway
New Zealand	Peru	Poland	Portugal
South Africa	Russia	Singapore	Slovenia
Switzerland	Sweden	Thailand	Chinese Taipei
Trinidad and Tobago	Tunisia	Turkey	Ukraine
Uruguay	United States	Venezuela

=== Classes (equipment) ===
Class	Type	Event	Sailors	Trapeze	Mainsail	Jib/Genoa	Spinnaker	First OG	Olympics so far
RS:X	Sailboard		1	-	+	-	-	2008	2
RS:X	Sailboard		1	-	+	-	-	2008	2
Laser Radial	Dinghy		1	-	+	-	-	2008	2
Laser	Dinghy		1	-	+	-	-	1996	5
Finn	Dinghy		1	0	+	–	–	1952	16
470	Dinghy		2	1	+	+	+	1988	7
470	Dinghy		2	1	+	+	+	1976	10
49er	Dinghy		2	2	+	+	+	2000	4
Elliott 6m	Keelboat		3	0	+	+	+	2012	1
Star	Keelboat		2	0	+	+	–	1932	18

2012 Olympic Classes designs

== Competition schedule ==
=== Actual Schedule ===
Legend

S	Series Race	MR	Medal Race (Top 10 Double Scoring)

Schedule
Dat	July						August											
Dat	26 Thu	27 Fri	28 Sat	29 Sun	30 Mon	31 Tue	1 Wed	2 Thu	3 Fri	4 Sat	5 Sun	6 Mon	7 Tue	8 Wed	9 Thu	10 Fri	11 Sat	12 Sun
Men's RS:X					30													

=== Original Schedule ===
Legend

●	Opening ceremony	●	ceremony	●	Practice Race (PR)	●	Race	●	Medal race

Schedule
Date	July						August											
Date	26 Thu	27 Fri	28 Sat	29 Sun	30 Mon	31 Tue	1 Wed	2 Thu	3 Fri	4 Sat	5 Sun	6 Mon	7 Tue	8 Wed	9 Thu	10 Fri	11 Sat	12 Sun
Ceremony		●																●
Windsurfing Male RS:X					PR	S1, S2	S3, S4	S5, S6	Reserve	S7, S8	S9, S10	Reserve	MR					
Windsurfing Female RS:X					PR	S1, S2	S3, S4	S5, S6	Reserve	S7, S8	S9, S10	Reserve	MR					
One Person - Male - Laser				PR	S1, S2	S3, S4	S5, S6	Reserve	S7, S8	S9, S10	Reserve	MR	Reserve					
One Person Heavy - Male - Finn			PR	S1, S2	S3, S4	S5, S6	Reserve	S7, S8	S9, S10	Reserve	MR	Reserve						
One Person Female Laser Radial				PR	S1, S2	S3, S4	S5, S6	Reserve	S7, S8	S9, S10	Reserve	MR	Reserve					
Two Person - Male - 470							PR	S1, S2	S3, S4	S5, S6	Reserve	S7, S8	S9, S10	Reserve	MR	Reserve		
Two Person - Female - 470								PR	S1, S2	S3, S4	S5, S6	Reserve	S7, S8	S9, S10	Reserve	MR	Reserve	
Two Person Skiff - Open - 49er				PR	S1, S2	S3, S4	S5, S6	S7, S8	S9, S10, S11	Reserve	S12, S13	S14, S15	Reserve	MR	Reserve			
Keelboat Fleet - Male - Star			PR	S1, S2	S3, S4	S5, S6	Reserve	S7, S8	S9, S10	Reserve	MR	Reserve						
Keelboat Match - Female - Elliott 6m	PR		PR	RR	RR	RR	RR	RR	Reserve	RR			KO	KO	KO	KO	FP	Reserve

Legend:

- Matchracing
  - RR = Round Robin phase
  - KO = Knockout phase
  - FP = Finals & Petite Finals
- Fleetracing
  - S=Series Race
  - MR = Medal races
- Res = Reserve

== Medal summary ==
=== Men's events ===
Games	Gold	Silver	Bronze
RS:X	Dorian van Rijsselberghe; Netherlands	Nick Dempsey; Great Britain	Przemysław Miarczyński; Poland
Laser	Tom Slingsby; Australia	Pavlos Kontides; Cyprus	Rasmus Myrgren; Sweden
Finn	Ben Ainslie; Great Britain	Jonas Høgh-Christensen; Denmark	Jonathan Lobert; France
470	Australia; Mathew Belcher; Malcolm Page	Great Britain; Luke Patience; Stuart Bithell	Argentina; Lucas Calabrese; Juan de la Fuente
Star	Sweden; Fredrik Lööf; Max Salminen	Great Britain; Iain Percy; Andrew Simpson	Brazil; Robert Scheidt; Bruno Prada
49er	Australia; Nathan Outteridge; Iain Jensen	New Zealand; Peter Burling; Blair Tuke	Denmark; Allan Nørregaard; Peter Lang

=== Women's events ===
Games	Gold	Silver	Bronze
RS:X	Marina Alabau; Spain	Tuuli Petäjä; Finland	Zofia Klepacka; Poland
Laser Radial	Xu Lijia; China	Marit Bouwmeester; Netherlands	Evi Van Acker; Belgium
470	New Zealand; Jo Aleh; Polly Powrie	Great Britain; Hannah Mills; Saskia Clark	Netherlands; Lisa Westerhof; Lobke Berkhout
Elliott 6m	Spain; Támara Echegoyen; Ángela Pumariega; Sofía Toro	Australia; Olivia Price; Nina Curtis; Lucinda Whitty	Finland; Silja Lehtinen; Silja Kanerva; Mikaela Wulff

== Medal table ==
Rank	Nation	Gold	Silver	Bronze	Total
1	Australia	3	1	0	4
2	Spain	2	0	0	2
3	Great Britain	1	4	0	5
4	Netherlands	1	1	1	3
5	New Zealand	1	1	0	2
6	Sweden	1	0	1	2
7	China	1	0	0	1
8	Denmark	0	1	1	2
8	Finland	0	1	1	2
10	Cyprus	0	1	0	1
11	Poland	0	0	2	2
12	Argentina	0	0	1	1
12	Belgium	0	0	1	1
12	Brazil	0	0	1	1
12	France	0	0	1	1
Totals (15 entries)		10	10	10	30
