= Finland at the 2012 Summer Olympics =

- IOC code: FIN
- NOC: Finnish Olympic Committee
- Website: sport.fi/olympiakomitea (in Finnish and Swedish)

in London
- Competitors: 56 in 14 sports
- Flag bearers: Hanna-Maria Seppälä (opening); Antti Ruuskanen (closing)
- Medals Ranked 60th: Gold 0 Silver 2 Bronze 1 Total 3

Summer Olympics appearances (overview)
- 1908; 1912; 1920; 1924; 1928; 1932; 1936; 1948; 1952; 1956; 1960; 1964; 1968; 1972; 1976; 1980; 1984; 1988; 1992; 1996; 2000; 2004; 2008; 2012; 2016; 2020; 2024

Other related appearances
- 1906 Intercalated Games

Finland competed at the 2012 Summer Olympics in London, from 27 July to 12 August 2012. The nation has competed at every Summer Olympic Games since its official debut in 1908. The Finnish Olympic Committee (Finnish: Suomen Olympiakomitea, SO) sent a total of 56 athletes to the Games, 29 men and 27 women, to compete in 14 sports. There was only a single competitor in artistic gymnastics, taekwondo, weightlifting and tennis.

Notable Finnish athletes included the defending champion Satu Mäkelä-Nummela in women's trap shooting, and Olympic bronze medalist Tero Pitkämäki in men's javelin throw. Badminton player Anu Nieminen, and swimmer Hanna-Maria Seppälä, who finished fourth in the women's freestyle event, made their fourth Olympic appearance as the most experienced athletes. Seppälä also became Finland's first female flag bearer at the Summer Olympics' opening ceremony (in the Winter Olympics, Marja-Liisa Kirvesniemi had carried the Finnish flag in 1994).

Suomen Olympiakomitea (SO) set a goal of three medals, with at least one gold medal and six point positions in eighth-place finish, to be targeted in the medal standings. At the end of the Games, Finland already had three medals, but reached beyond the medal target by a single point.

Finland, however, left London with two silvers and one bronze medal in sailing and athletics, failing to win a gold medal for the second time in Summer Olympic history since 2004. Antti Ruuskanen only received his silver medal in 2017, due to doping by the original silver medalist Oleksandr Pyatnytsya from Ukraine. Several Finnish athletes who reached finals missed out on the medal standings including Pitkämäki, and taekwondo jin Suvi Mikkonen.

== Medalists ==
Medals by sport
| Sport | 1st place, gold medalist(s) | 2nd place, silver medalist(s) | 3rd place, bronze medalist(s) | Total |
| Sailing | 0 | 1 | 1 | 2 |
| Athletics | 0 | 1 | 0 | 1 |
| Total | 0 | 2 | 1 | 3 |

| Medal | Name | Sport | Event | Date |
|---|---|---|---|---|
| Silver | Tuuli Petäjä | Sailing | Women's sailboard | 7 August |
| Silver | Antti Ruuskanen | Athletics | Men's javelin throw | 11 August |
| Bronze | Silja Kanerva; Silja Lehtinen; Mikaela Wulff | Sailing | Elliott 6m | 11 August |

== Athletics ==
Finnish athletes have so far achieved qualifying standards in the following athletics events (up to a maximum of 3 athletes in each event at the 'A' Standard, and 1 at the 'B' Standard):

Key

- Note – Ranks given for track events are within the athlete's heat only
- Q = Qualified for the next round
- q = Qualified for the next round as a fastest loser or, in field events, by position without achieving the qualifying target
- NR = National record
- N/A = Round not applicable for the event
- Bye = Athlete not required to compete in round

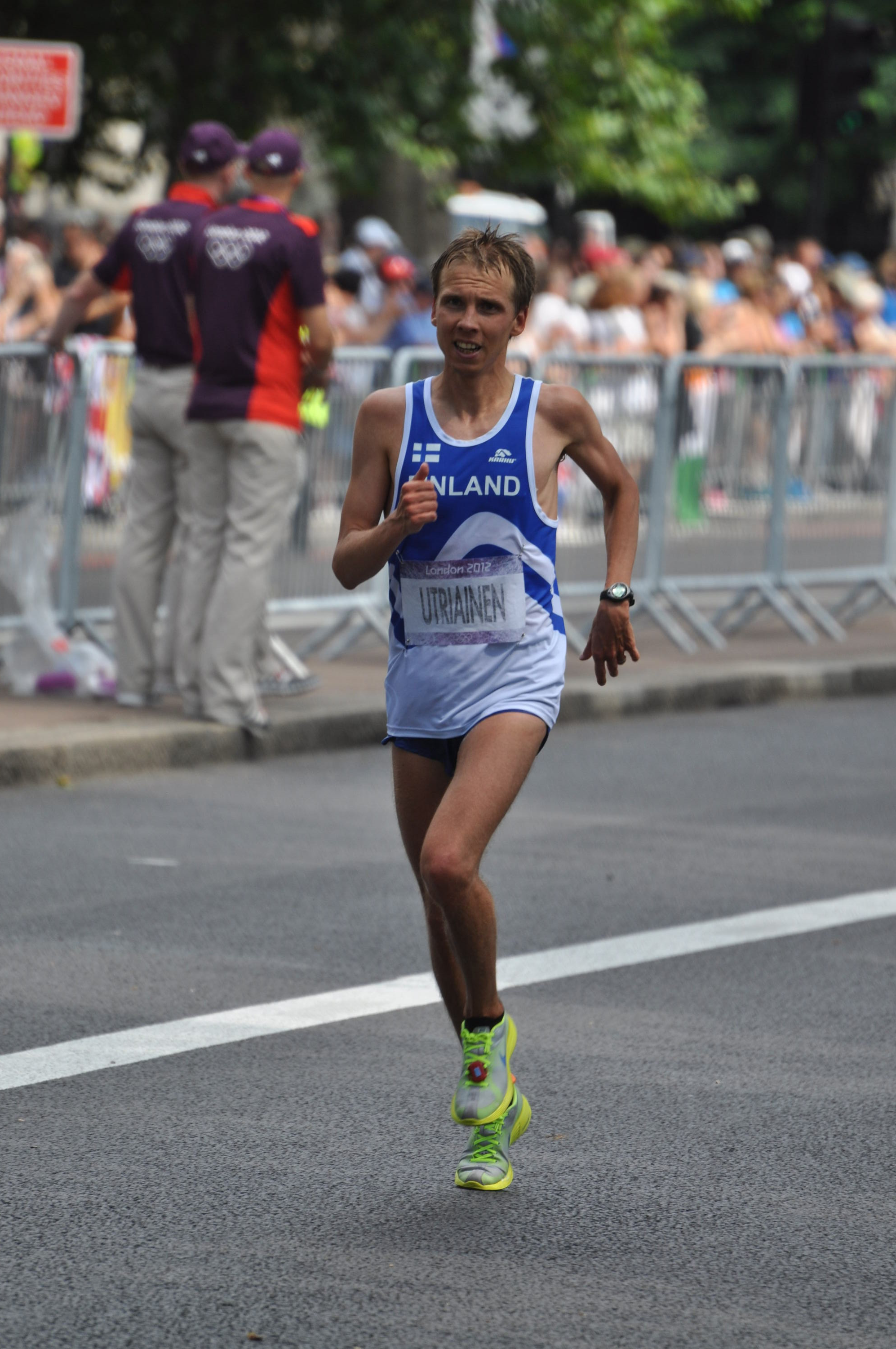
Jussi Utriainen in men's marathon

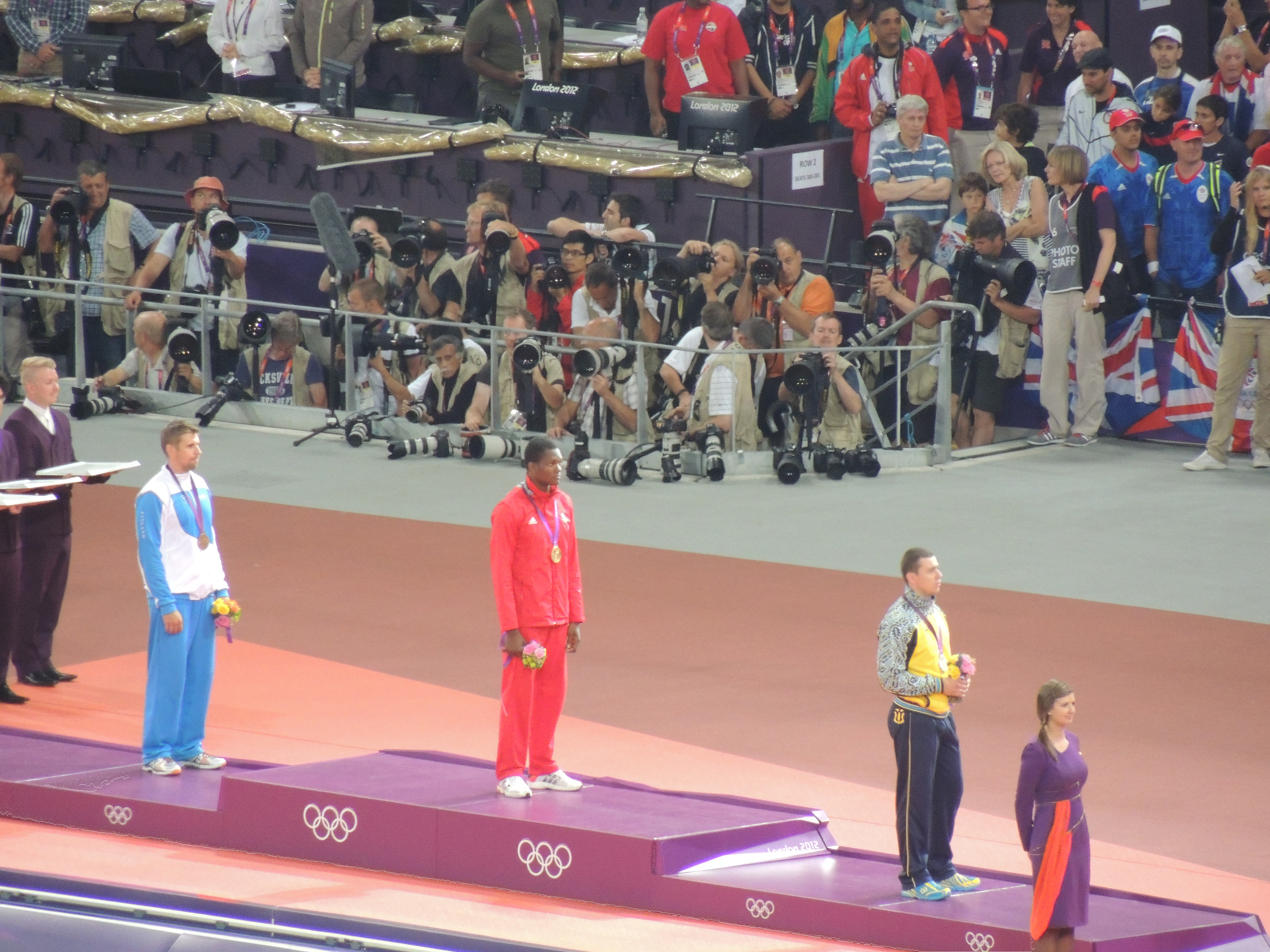
Javelin throw men's medal ceremony, Antti Ruuskanen in second place

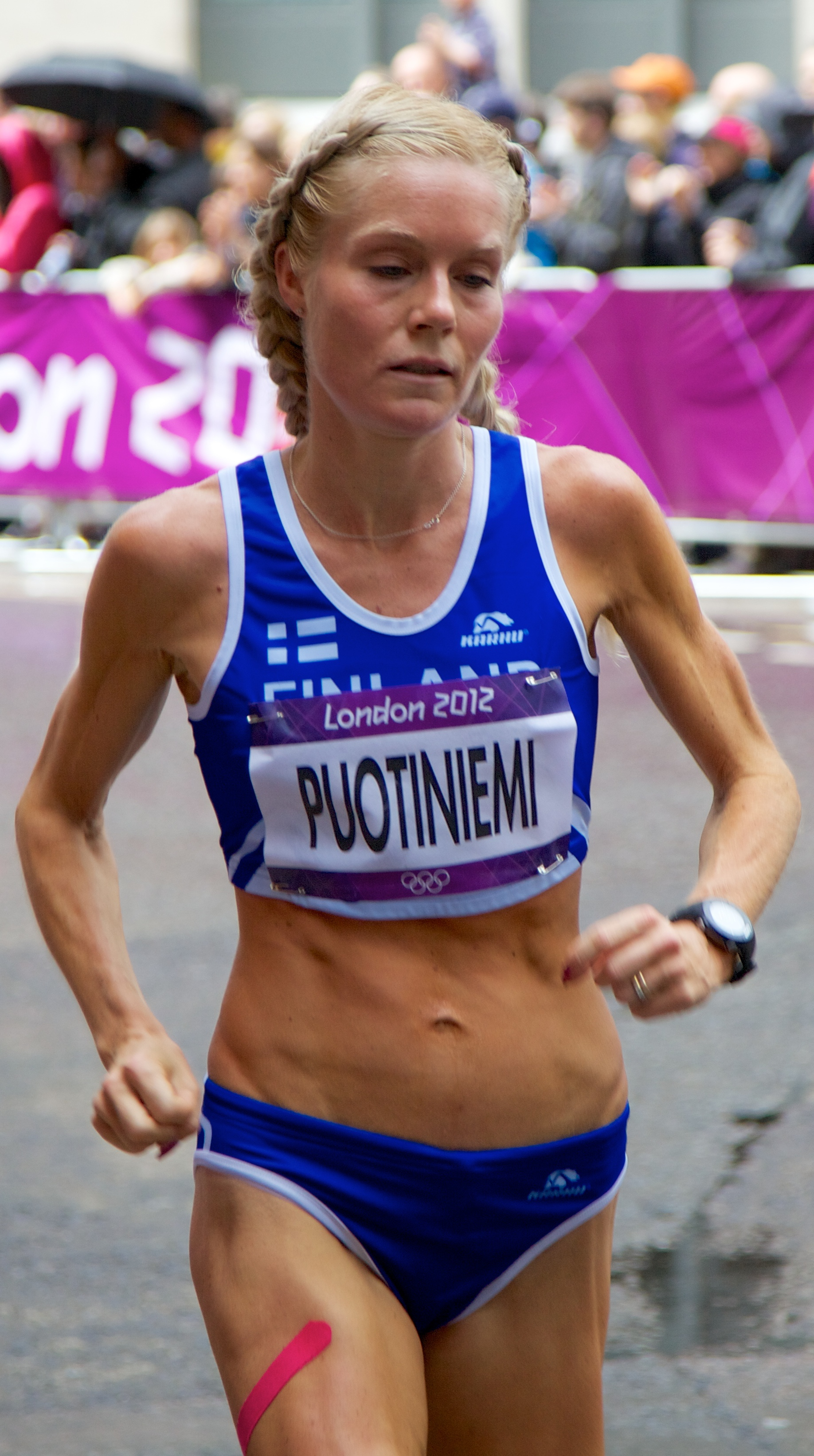
Leena Puotiniemi in women's marathon

Men
Track & road events

| Athlete | Event | Heat | | Semifinal | | Final | |
| Athlete | Event | Result | Rank | Result | Rank | Result | Rank |
|---|---|---|---|---|---|---|---|
| Jonathan Åstrand | 200 m | 20.73 | 5 | Did not advance | | | |
| Antti Kempas | 50 km walk | —N/a | | | | 4:01:50 | 41 |
| Jukka Keskisalo | 3000 m steeplechase | 8:29.13 | 4 Q | —N/a | | DNF | |
| Jarkko Kinnunen | 50 km walk | —N/a | | | | 3:46:25 | 15 |
| Niclas Sandells | 1500 m | 3:42.67 | 11 | Did not advance | | | |
| Jussi Utriainen | Marathon | —N/a | | | | 2:26:25 | 69 |

Field events

| Athlete | Event | Qualification | | Final | |
| Athlete | Event | Distance | Position | Distance | Position |
|---|---|---|---|---|---|
| Jere Bergius | Pole vault | NM | — | Did not advance | |
| Ari Mannio | Javelin throw | 81.99 | 8 q | 78.60 | 11 |
| Tero Pitkämäki | Javelin throw | 83.01 | 3 Q | 82.80 | 5 |
| Antti Ruuskanen | Javelin throw | 81.74 | 11 q | 84.12 | 2nd place, silver medalist(s) |
| David Söderberg | Hammer throw | 71.76 | 26 | Did not advance | |
| Osku Torro | High jump | 2.21 | =16 | Did not advance | |

Women
Track & road events

| Athlete | Event | Heat | | Final | |
| Athlete | Event | Result | Rank | Result | Rank |
|---|---|---|---|---|---|
| Sandra Eriksson | 3000 m steeplechase | 9:50.71 | 8 | Did not advance | |
| Anne Halkivaha | 20 km walk | —N/a | | 1:38:49 | 54 |
| Leena Puotiniemi | Marathon | —N/a | | 2:42:01 | 87 |

Field events

| Athlete | Event | Qualification | | Final | |
| Athlete | Event | Distance | Position | Distance | Position |
|---|---|---|---|---|---|
| Minna Nikkanen | Pole vault | 4.25 | =26 | Did not advance | |
| Sanni Utriainen | Javelin throw | NM | — | Did not advance | |

== Badminton ==
| Athlete | Event | Group Stage | | | Elimination | Quarterfinal | Semifinal | Final / BM | |
| Athlete | Event | Opposition Score | Opposition Score | Rank | Opposition Score | Opposition Score | Opposition Score | Opposition Score | Rank |
|---|---|---|---|---|---|---|---|---|---|
| Ville Lång | Men's singles | Lee C W (MAS); L 8–21, 21–14, 11–21 | —N/a | 2 | Did not advance | | | | |
| Anu Nieminen | Women's singles | Montero (MEX); W 21–12, 21–18 | Tai T-y (TPE); L 11–21, 14–21 | 2 | Did not advance | | | | |

== Canoeing ==
=== Sprint ===
| Athlete | Event | Heats | | Semifinals | | Final | |
| Athlete | Event | Time | Rank | Time | Rank | Time | Rank |
|---|---|---|---|---|---|---|---|
| Jenni Mikkonen | Women's K-1 200 m | 42.656 | 3 Q | 41.859 | 4 FB | 44.643 | 9 |
| Anne Rikala | Women's K-1 500 m | 1:52.641 | 1 Q | 1:51.852 | 3 FA | 1:54.333 | 8 |

Qualification Legend: FA = Qualify to final (medal); FB = Qualify to final B (non-medal)

== Cycling ==
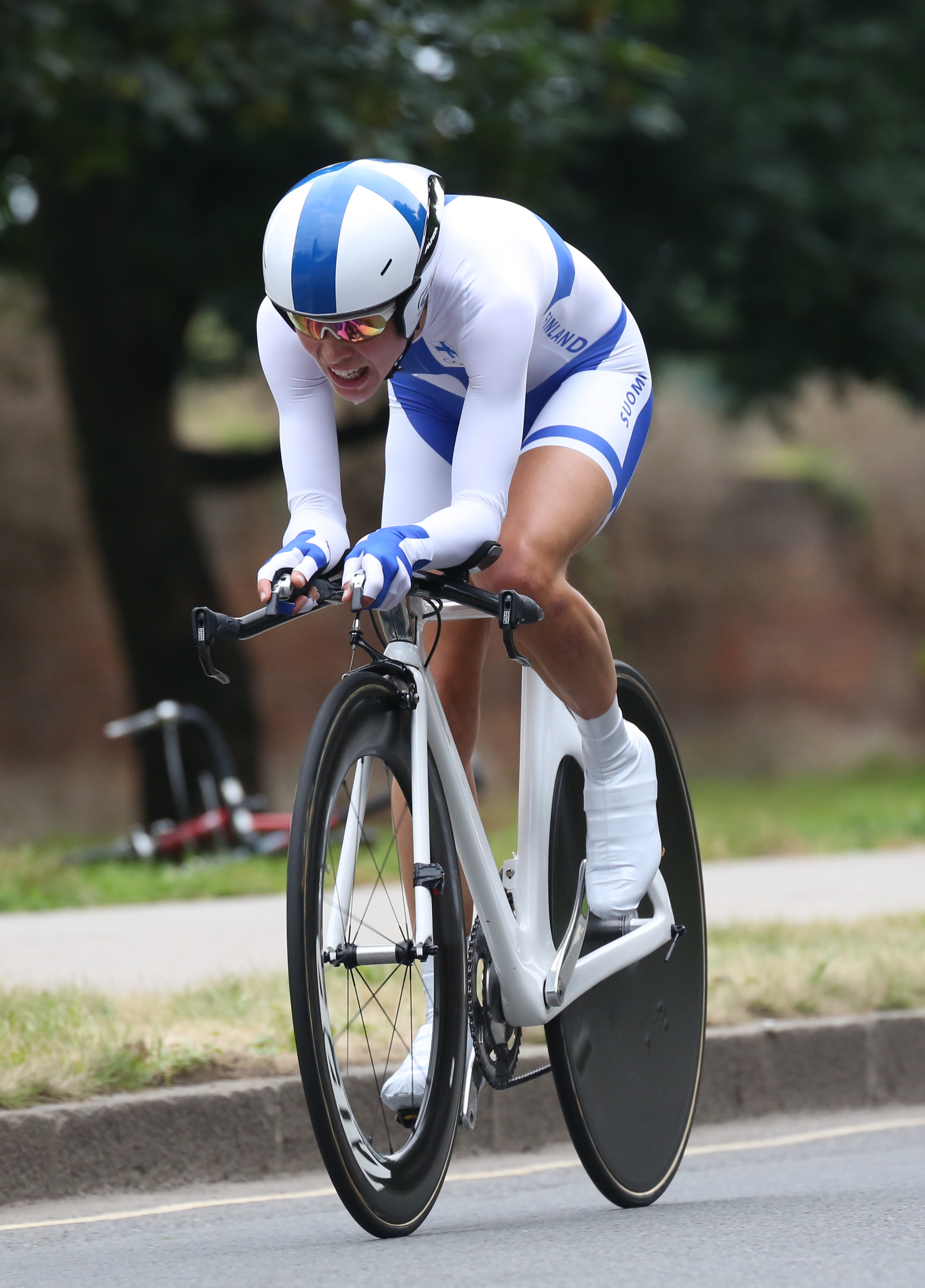
Pia Sundstedt finished eleventh in women's time trial

=== Road ===
| Athlete | Event | Time | Rank |
|---|---|---|---|
| Jussi Veikkanen | Men's road race | 5:46:37 | 65 |
| Pia Sundstedt | Women's road race | 3:35:56 | 20 |
| Pia Sundstedt | Women's time trial | 40:01.69 | 11 |

== Equestrian ==
=== Dressage ===
| Athlete | Horse | Event | Grand Prix | | Grand Prix Special | | Grand Prix Freestyle | | Overall | |
| Athlete | Horse | Event | Score | Rank | Score | Rank | Technical | Artistic | Score | Rank |
|---|---|---|---|---|---|---|---|---|---|---|
| Emma Kanerva | Sini Spirit | Individual | 70.395 | 29 Q | 71.889 | 22 | Did not advance | | | |
| Mikaela Lindh | Mas Guapo | Individual | 70.729 | 26 Q | 69.016 | 30 | Did not advance | | | |

== Gymnastics ==
=== Artistic ===
Women

| Athlete | Event | Qualification | | | | | | Final | | | | | |
| Athlete | Event | Apparatus | | | | Total | Rank | Apparatus | | | | Total | Rank |
| Athlete | Event | F | V | UB | BB | Total | Rank | F | V | UB | BB | Total | Rank |
|---|---|---|---|---|---|---|---|---|---|---|---|---|---|
| Annika Urvikko | All-around | 13.200 | 12.416 | 10.933 | 12.266 | 48.815 | 55 | Did not advance | | | | | |

== Judo ==
| Athlete | Event | Round of 64 | Round of 32 | Round of 16 | Quarterfinals | Semifinals | Repechage | Final / BM | |
| Athlete | Event | Opposition Result | Opposition Result | Opposition Result | Opposition Result | Opposition Result | Opposition Result | Opposition Result | Rank |
|---|---|---|---|---|---|---|---|---|---|
| Valtteri Jokinen | Men's −60 kg | Bye | Moudatir (MAR); W 0100–0000 | Choi G-H (KOR); L 0000–0010 | Did not advance | | | | |
| Jaana Sundberg | Women's −52 kg | —N/a | Kelmendi (ALB); L 0001–0110 | Did not advance | | | | | |
| Johanna Ylinen | Women's −63 kg | —N/a | Bye | Tsedevsuren (MGL); L 0000–1000 | Did not advance | | | | |

== Sailing ==
Finland has qualified 1 boat for each of the following events

Men

| Athlete | Event | Race | | | | | | | | | | | Net points | Final rank |
| Athlete | Event | 1 | 2 | 3 | 4 | 5 | 6 | 7 | 8 | 9 | 10 | M* | Net points | Final rank |
|---|---|---|---|---|---|---|---|---|---|---|---|---|---|---|
| Mattias Lindfors | Laser | 25 | 28 | 23 | 30 | 36 | 22 | 20 | ~~42~~ | 39 | 40 | EL | 263 | 33 |
| Tapio Nirkko | Finn | 11 | 13 | 8 | 5 | 3 | 12 | 4 | 5 | 15 | ~~17~~ | 16 | 92 | 10 |
| Joonas Lindgren; Niklas Lindgren | 470 | ~~22~~ | 19 | 22 | 17 | 12 | 15 | 26 | 21 | 21 | 18 | EL | 167 | 21 |

Women

| Athlete | Event | Race | | | | | | | | | | | Net points | Final rank |
| Athlete | Event | 1 | 2 | 3 | 4 | 5 | 6 | 7 | 8 | 9 | 10 | M* | Net points | Final rank |
|---|---|---|---|---|---|---|---|---|---|---|---|---|---|---|
| Tuuli Petäjä | RS:X | ~~8~~ | 7 | 3 | 4 | 4 | 4 | 8 | 2 | 5 | 1 | 4 | 46 | 2nd place, silver medalist(s) |
| Sari Multala | Laser Radial | 4 | 6 | 15 | 4 | 19 | ~~21~~ | 3 | 2 | 16 | 5 | 20 | 94 | 7 |

Match racing

| Athlete | Event | Round Robin | | | | | | | | | | | Rank | Knockouts | | | Rank |
| Athlete | Event | AUS | POR | SWE | NED | USA | GBR | ESP | DEN | RUS | NZL | FRA | Rank | Q-final | S-final | Final | Rank |
|---|---|---|---|---|---|---|---|---|---|---|---|---|---|---|---|---|---|
| Silja Kanerva; Silja Lehtinen; Mikaela Wulff | Elliott 6m | L | W | W | L | L | L | W | W | L | W | W | 5 Q | USA; W (3–1) | AUS; L (1–2) | RUS; W (3–1) | 3rd place, bronze medalist(s) |

Open

| Athlete | Event | Race | | | | | | | | | | | | | | | | Net points | Final rank |
| Athlete | Event | 1 | 2 | 3 | 4 | 5 | 6 | 7 | 8 | 9 | 10 | 11 | 12 | 13 | 14 | 15 | M* | Net points | Final rank |
|---|---|---|---|---|---|---|---|---|---|---|---|---|---|---|---|---|---|---|---|
| Kalle Bask; Lauri Lehtinen | 49er | ~~19~~ | 18 | 4 | 11 | 6 | 8 | 2 | 2 | 1 | 11 | 3 | 11 | 19 | 11 | 2 | 20 | 129 | 7 |

M = Medal race; EL = Eliminated – did not advance into the medal race;

== Shooting ==
Finland has earned four quota places in shooting events;

Men

| Athlete | Event | Qualification | | Final | |
| Athlete | Event | Points | Rank | Points | Rank |
|---|---|---|---|---|---|
| Kai Jahnsson | 50 m pistol | 552 | 26 | Did not advance | |
| Kai Jahnsson | 10 m air pistol | 583 | 7 Q | 96.1 | 8 |

Women

| Athlete | Event | Qualification | | Final | |
| Athlete | Event | Points | Rank | Points | Rank |
|---|---|---|---|---|---|
| Satu Mäkelä-Nummela | Trap | 70 | 7 | Did not advance | |
| Mira Suhonen | 10 m air pistol | 377 | 32 | Did not advance | |
| Marjo Yli-Kiikka | 50 m rifle 3 positions | 578 | 23 | Did not advance | |
| Marjo Yli-Kiikka | 10 m air rifle | 365 | 16 | Did not advance | |

== Swimming ==
Finnish swimmers have so far achieved qualifying standards in the following events (up to a maximum of 2 swimmers in each event at the Olympic Qualifying Time (OQT), and 1 at the Olympic Selection Time (OST)):

Men

| Athlete | Event | Heat | | Semifinal | | Final | |
| Athlete | Event | Time | Rank | Time | Rank | Time | Rank |
|---|---|---|---|---|---|---|---|
| Matias Koski | 200 m freestyle | 1:49.84 | 31 | Did not advance | | | |
| Matias Koski | 400 m freestyle | 3:54.96 | 22 | —N/a | | Did not advance | |
| Matias Koski | 1500 m freestyle | 15:34.80 | 27 | —N/a | | Did not advance | |
| Ari-Pekka Liukkonen | 50 m freestyle | 22.57 | 25 | Did not advance | | | |
| Matti Mattsson | 200 m breaststroke | 2:11.81 NR | 17 | Did not advance | | | |

Women

| Athlete | Event | Heat | | Semifinal | | Final | |
| Athlete | Event | Time | Rank | Time | Rank | Time | Rank |
|---|---|---|---|---|---|---|---|
| Jenna Laukkanen | 100 m breaststroke | 1:09.92 | 34 | Did not advance | | | |
| Jenna Laukkanen | 200 m breaststroke | 2:31.23 | 32 | Did not advance | | | |
| Noora Laukkanen | 400 m individual medley | 4:53.54 | 33 | —N/a | | Did not advance | |
| Emilia Pikkarainen | 100 m butterfly | 59.55 | 29 | Did not advance | | | |
| Emilia Pikkarainen | 200 m butterfly | 2:13.81 | 27 | Did not advance | | | |
| Emilia Pikkarainen | 200 m individual medley | 2:17.66 | 33 | Did not advance | | | |
| Hanna-Maria Seppälä | 50 m freestyle | 25.55 | 26 | Did not advance | | | |
| Hanna-Maria Seppälä | 100 m freestyle | 54.93 | 18 | Did not advance | | | |
| Hanna-Maria Seppälä | 200 m freestyle | 2:04.21 | 33 | Did not advance | | | |

== Taekwondo ==
Finland has qualified 1 athlete.

| Athlete | Event | Round of 16 | Quarterfinals | Semifinals | Repechage | Bronze Medal | Final | |
| Athlete | Event | Opposition Result | Opposition Result | Opposition Result | Opposition Result | Opposition Result | Opposition Result | Rank |
|---|---|---|---|---|---|---|---|---|
| Suvi Mikkonen | Women's −57 kg | Diedhiou (SEN); W 9–6 | Hou Yz (CHN); L 2–7 | Did not advance | Lopez (USA); W 9–4 | Tseng L-C (TPE); L 2–14 | Did not advance | 5 |

== Tennis ==
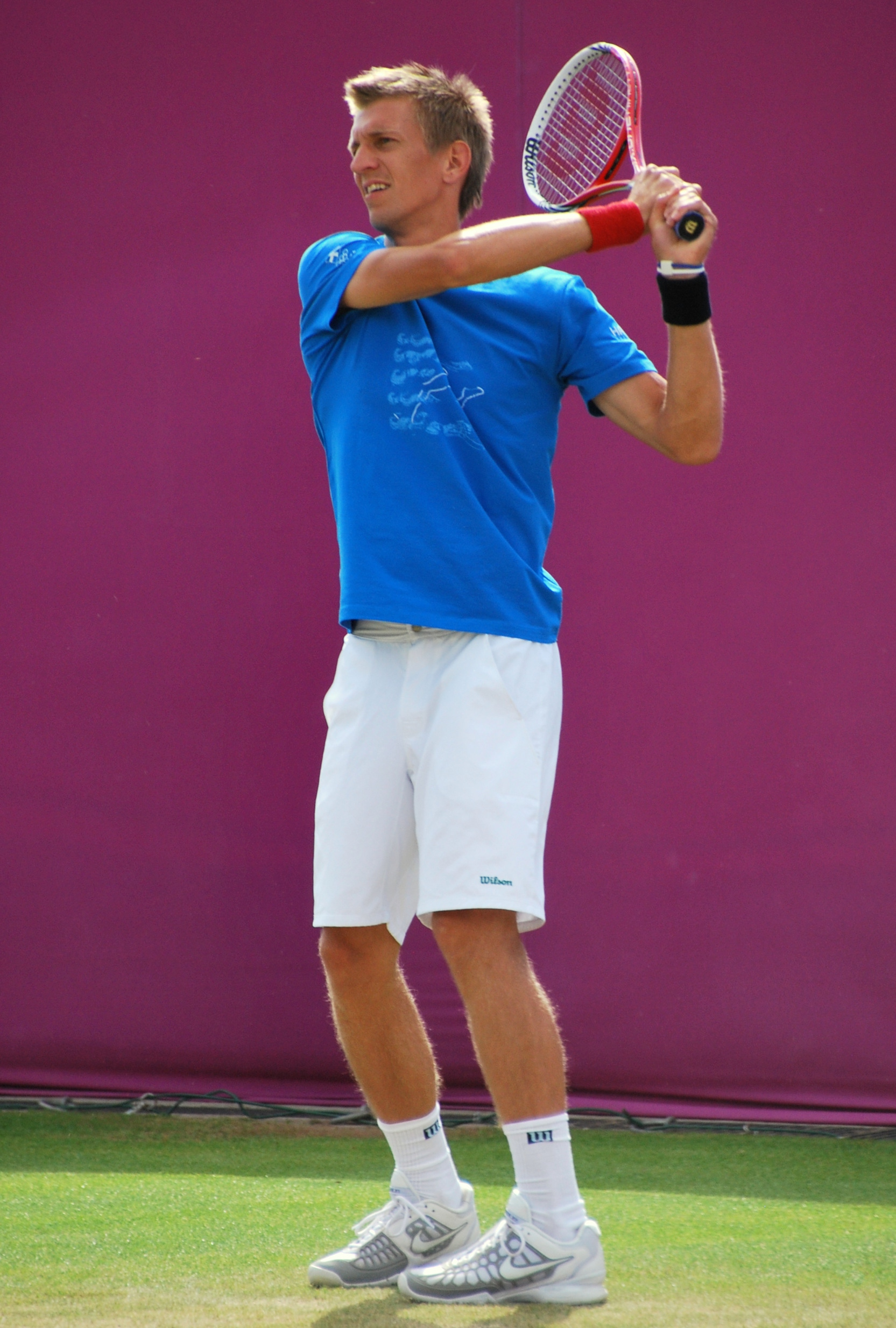
Jarkko Nieminen witnessed his action in men's singles.

| Athlete | Event | Round of 64 | Round of 32 | Round of 16 | Quarterfinals | Semifinals | Final / BM | |
| Athlete | Event | Opposition Score | Opposition Score | Opposition Score | Opposition Score | Opposition Score | Opposition Score | Rank |
|---|---|---|---|---|---|---|---|---|
| Jarkko Nieminen | Men's singles | Devvarman (IND); W 6–3, 6–1 | Murray (GBR); L 2–6, 4–6 | Did not advance | | | | |

== Weightlifting ==
| Athlete | Event | Snatch | | Clean & Jerk | | Total | Rank |
| Athlete | Event | Result | Rank | Result | Rank | Total | Rank |
|---|---|---|---|---|---|---|---|
| Miika Antti-Roiko | Men's −94 kg | 140 | =17 | 180 | =17 | 320 | 19 |

== Wrestling ==
Finland has qualified two quota places.

Key

- VT - Victory by Fall.
- PP - Decision by Points - the loser with technical points.
- PO - Decision by Points - the loser without technical points.

Men's Greco-Roman

| Athlete | Event | Qualification | Round of 16 | Quarterfinal | Semifinal | Repechage 1 | Repechage 2 | Final / BM | |
| Athlete | Event | Opposition Result | Opposition Result | Opposition Result | Opposition Result | Opposition Result | Opposition Result | Opposition Result | Rank |
|---|---|---|---|---|---|---|---|---|---|
| Jarkko Ala-Huikku | −60 kg | Bye | Belmadani (FRA); L 0–3 ^{PO} | Did not advance | | | | | 16 |
| Rami Hietaniemi | −84 kg | Bye | Noumonvi (FRA); L 0–3 ^{PO} | Did not advance | | | | | 15 |
