= Sailing at the 2012 Summer Olympics – Elliott 6m =

Women's Elliott 6m at the Games of the XXX Olympiad
- Line drawing of the Elliott 6m
- Venue: Weymouth and Portland National Sailing Academy
- Dates: 29 July – 11 August
- Competitors: 36 from 12 nations
- Teams: 12 (boats)

Medalists
1st place, gold medalist(s)		Támara Echegoyen; Ángela Pumariega; Sofía Toro	Spain
2nd place, silver medalist(s)		Olivia Price; Nina Curtis; Lucinda Whitty	Australia
3rd place, bronze medalist(s)		Silja Lehtinen; Silja Kanerva; Mikaela Wulff	Finland

The Women's Elliott 6m was a sailing event on the Sailing at the 2012 Summer Olympics program in Weymouth and Portland National Sailing Academy. The competition followed a match race format. It consisted of a round-robin a quarter finals, semi-finals, petit-final and final series. The top eight crews from the round-robin were seeded into the quarter finals.

== Summary ==
A total of 98 matches were sailed:

- Sixty-seven matches were sailed in the round robin (including the rematch between FIN and POR. Finland originally won the round robin race against Portugal, but this was annulled after a protest by Portugal due to a Portuguese boat getting stuck at the turning mark. Finland won the rescheduled race as well.)
- The quarter finals (best 3 out of 5) 16 matches were sailed.
- Semi-finals, best 2 out of 3 (best 3 out of 5) was planned. Russia appealed the decision to stop the semi-finals after 3 matches and the results of 4th match of the petite final to CAS. The appeal to the semi-finals decision was later rejected.) Six matches were sailed.
- Petit-final and final series (best 3 out of 5) 4 matches.
- In the final a total of 5 matches were sailed.

== Schedule ==
●	Practice race	●	Round Robin on Nothe	●	Knock-out on Nothe	●	Semi-finals on Nothe	●	Finals on Nothe

Date	July						August											
Date	26 Thu	27 Fri	28 Sat	29 Sun	30 Mon	31 Tue	1 Wed	2 Thu	3 Fri	4 Sat	5 Sun	6th Mon	7 Tue	8 Wed	9 Thu	10 Fri	11 Sat	12 Sun
Women's Elliott 6m			●	11	13	12	12	9	8	Spare day	1	8	12	Spare day	10	9		

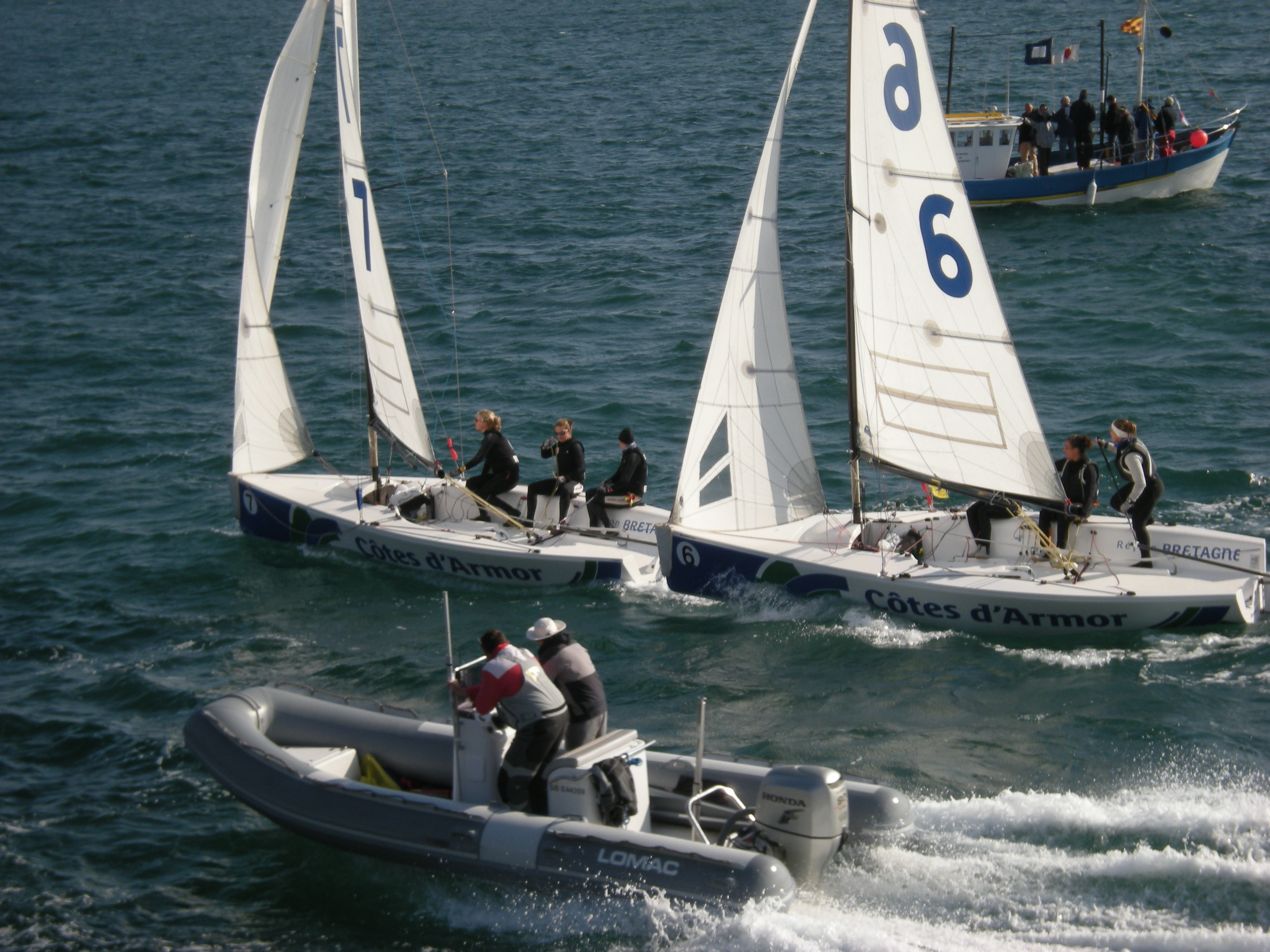
Elliott 6ms during match racing

== Course areas and course configurations ==
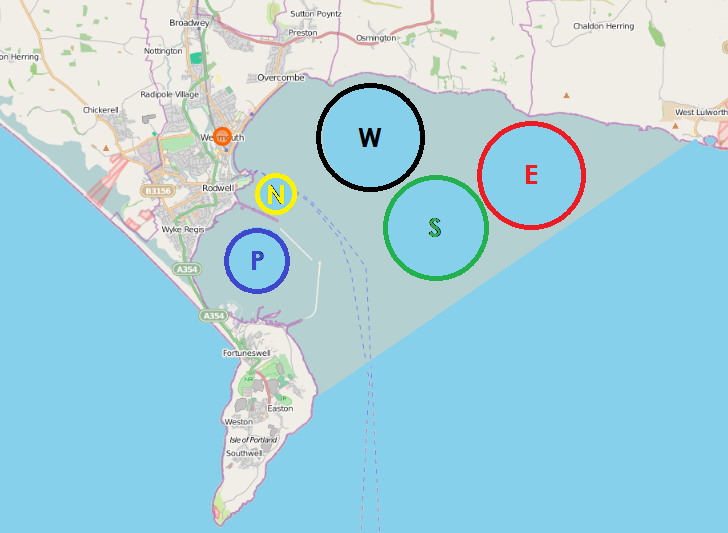
Course areas: Portland (P) Nothe (N) West (W) / South (S) East (E)

For the Elliott 6m the majority of racing took place on course area Nothe, however some racing also occurred in the Portland area. The location (50° 36.18’ N 02° 25.98’ W) points to the center of the Nothe course area. The target time for the course was 18 minutes. All races were conducted on windward/leeward course configurations of 2 laps.

== Results ==
=== Round Robin ===
Rank	Country	AUS	RUS	ESP	USA	FIN	FRA	GBR	NED	NZL	DEN	POR	SWE	Races	Won	Lost	Points
1	Australia		1	1	1	1	1	1	1	1	1	1	1	11	11	0	11
2	Russia	1 PEN		1	1	1	0	1	1	1	1	1	1	11	9	2	8
3	Spain	0	0		1	0	1	1	1	1	1	1	1	11	8	3	8
4	United States	0	0	0		1	1	1	1	1	1	0	1	11	8	3	8
5	Finland	0	0	1	0		1	0	0	1	1	1	1	11	6	5	6
6	France	0	1	0	0	0		0	1	1	1	1	1	11	6	5	6
7	Great Britain	0	0	0	0	1	1		0	0	1	1	1	11	5	6	5
8	Netherlands	0	0	0 DNF	0	1	0 DSQ	1		1	0	1	0	11	4	7	4
9	New Zealand	0	0	0	0	0	0	1	0		1	1	1	11	4	7	4
10	Denmark	0	0	0	0	0	0 DNF	0	1	0		1	1	11	3	8	3
11	Portugal	0	0	0	0	0 DNF	0	0 DNF	0 DNF	0	0		1	11	1	10	1
12	Sweden	0	0	0	0	0	0	0	1	0	0	0		11	1	10	1

Legend: – Qualified for next phase; DNF – Did not finish; DSQ – Disqualified; PEN – Penalty given by the protest committee;

=== Knock-out and Finals ===
Knock Out; 7 – 8 August 2012
8	Netherlands	0	1	0	0	x
1	Australia	1	0	1	1	x
5	Finland	1	1	0	1	x
4	United States	0	0	1	0	x
6	France	0	0	0	x	x
3	Spain	1	1	1	x	x
7	Great Britain	0	1	1	0	0
2	Russia	1	0	0	1	1

Semi Finals; 10 August 2012
Australia	0	1	1	x	x
Finland	1	0	0	x	x
Spain	0	1	1	x	x
Russia	1	0	0	x	x

Finals; 11 August 2012
2nd place, silver medalist(s)	Australia	0	1	0	1	0
1st place, gold medalist(s)	Spain	1	0	1	0	1
Third place
3rd place, bronze medalist(s)	Finland	1	0	1	1	x
4	Russia	0	1	0	0	x

=== 5th to 8th place ===
Sail-offs for places 5–8, scheduled for August 9, were cancelled due to low winds. The Round-robin results were used for final placement.

=== Final ranking ===
Rank	Country	Helmsman	Crew	Round Robin	Knock out	Semi Finals	Finals
1st place, gold medalist(s)	Spain	Támara Echegoyen	Ángela Pumariega; Sofía Toro	3	1	1	1
2nd place, silver medalist(s)	Australia	Olivia Price	Nina Curtis; Lucinda Whitty	1	1	1	2
3rd place, bronze medalist(s)	Finland	Silja Lehtinen	Silja Kanerva; Mikaela Wulff	5	1	1	3
4	Russia	Ekaterina Skudina	Elena Oblova; Elena Syuzeva	2	1	1	4
5	United States	Anna Tunnicliffe	Deborah Capozzi; Molly O'Bryan – Vandemoer	4	5	-	-
6	France	Claire Leroy	Élodie Bertrand; Marie Riou	6	6	-	-
7	Great Britain	Lucy MacGregor	Annie Lush; Kate MacGregor	7	7	-	-
8	Netherlands	Renee Groeneveld	Annemieke Bes; Marcelien Bos – de Koning	8	8	-	-
9	New Zealand	Stephanie Hazard	Jenna Hansen; Susannah Pyatt	9	-	-	-
10	Denmark	Lotte Meldegaard Pedersen	Susanne Boidin; Tina Gramkov	10	-	-	-
11	Portugal	Rita Gonçalves	Mariana Lobato; Diana Neves	11	-	-	-
12	Sweden	Anna Kjellberg	Malin Källström; Lotta Harrysson	12	-	-	-
