= Elliott 6m =

Olympic-class keelboat

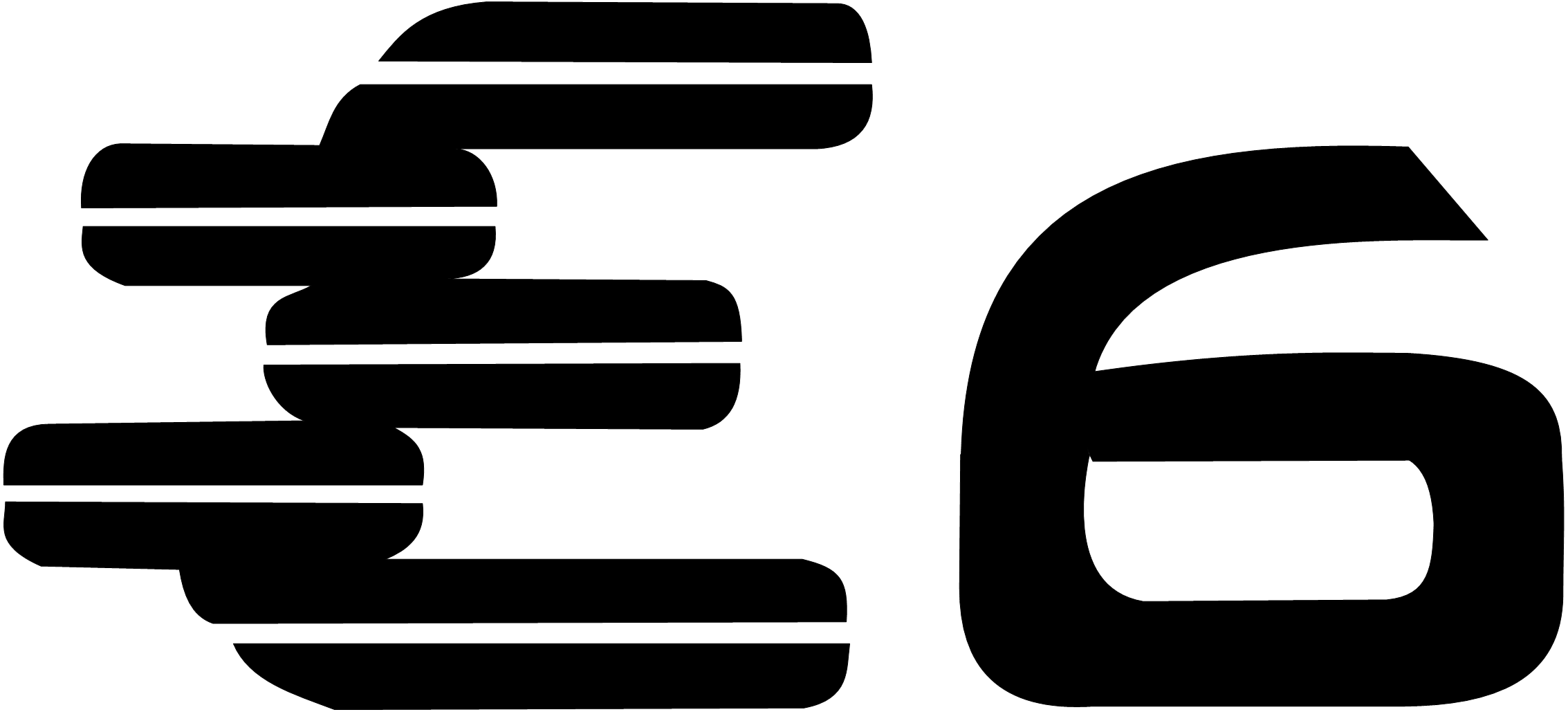
- Class symbol

Boat
- Crew: 3 (max. 205 kg)
- Draft: 1.66 m

Hull
- LOA: 6.0 m (19.7 ft)
- LWL: 6.0 m
- Beam: 2.35 m (7 ft 9 in)

Sails
- Mainsail area: 15.9 m^{2}
- Jib/genoa area: 7.7 m^{2}
- Spinnaker area: 28.0 m^{2}
- Upwind sail area: 23.6 m^{2}

The Elliott 6m is an Olympic-class keelboat, designed by New Zealander, Greg Elliott. It was selected for the women's match racing event for the 2012 Olympics. The Elliott 6m carries a spinnaker pole and symmetric spinnaker which are considered more suitable for match racing.

== Olympics ==
- Sailing at the 2012 Summer Olympics

Games	Gold	Silver	Bronze
2012 London	Spain (ESP); Támara Echegoyen; Ángela Pumariega; Sofía Toro	Australia (AUS); Olivia Price; Nina Curtis; Lucinda Whitty	Finland (FIN); Silja Lehtinen; Silja Kanerva; Mikaela Wulff

== See also ==
- Elliott 6m World Championships
