= Nina Curtis =

Australian sailor (born 1988)

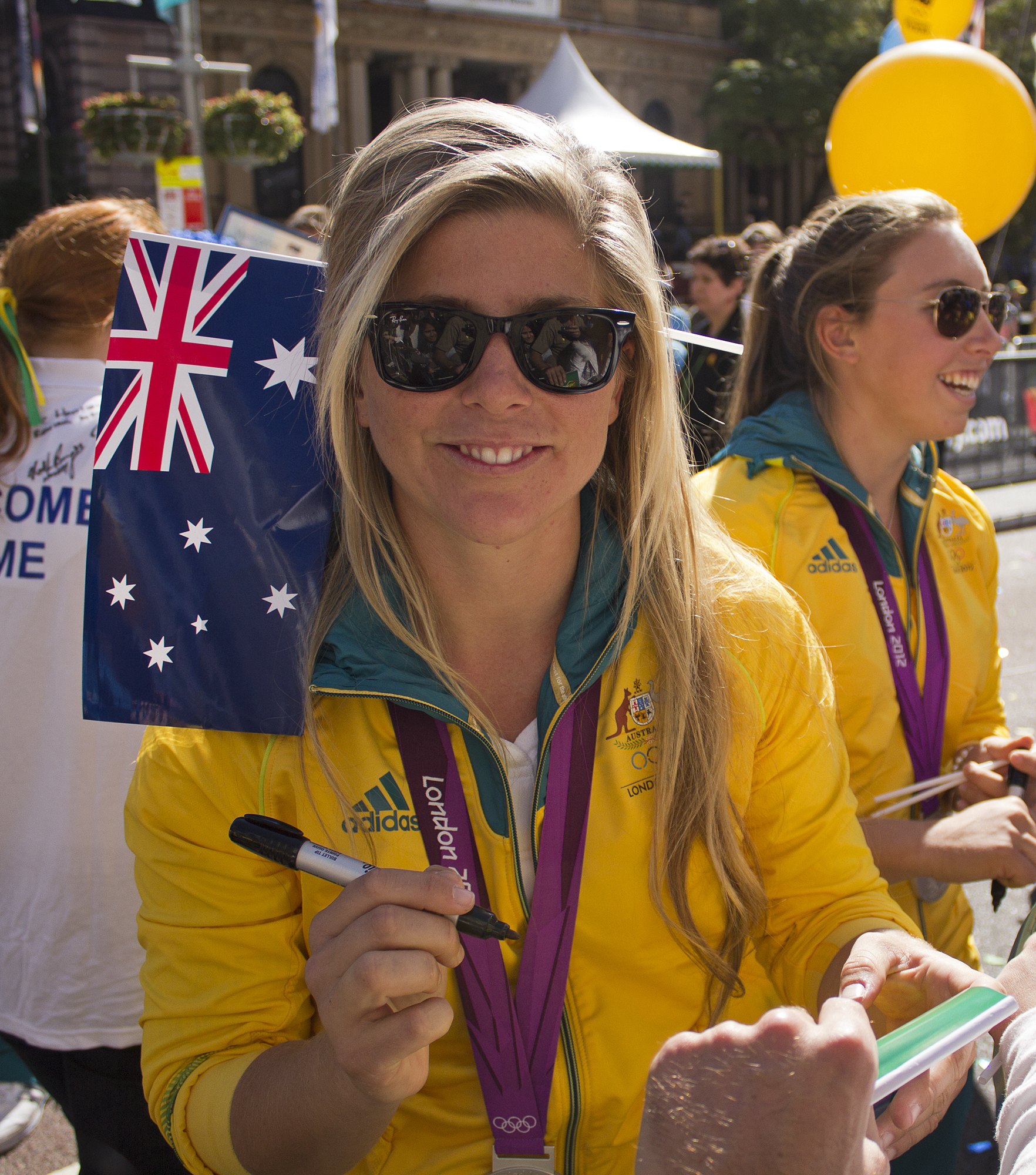
- Curtis at the Welcome Home parade in Sydney

Personal information
- Born: 24 January 1988 (age 38) Sydney, New South Wales
- Height: 167 cm (5 ft 6 in) (2012)
- Weight: 63 kg (139 lb) (2012)

Sailing career
- Sport: Sailing
- Club: Royal Prince Albert Yacht Club
- Classes: Nacra 17, 49er FX, Elliott 6m, Sonar, Foiling50, Yngling, Hobie 16
Medal record
Sailing
Representing Australia
Olympic Games
Silver medal – second place	2012 London	Elliott 6m

Nina Curtis (born 24 January 1988) is an Australian sailor. She represented Australia at the 2012 Summer Olympics in sailing, winning a silver medal.

== Personal ==
Curtis was born on 24 January 1988 in Sydney. She attended Bilgola Plateau Primary School before going to high school at Barrenjoey High School. She earned a Bachelor of Arts in Human Movement from the University of Technology, Sydney after attending from 2006 to 2008. As of 2012, she lives in Sydney.

Curtis is 167 centimetres (66 in) tall and weighs 61 kilograms (134 lb).

== Sailing ==
Curtis is a sailor. She started competing in the sport when she was eight years old, after having her parents expose her to it since she was a toddler. She has been coached by Euan McNicol since 2010. From 2008 to 2010, she was coached by Dayne Sharpe. Her primary training base is Sydney, with a secondary training base in Weymouth. She is a member of the Royal Prince Alfred Yacht Club. She has a sailing scholarship from the Australian Institute of Sport and New South Wales Institute of Sport. Her national team debut was at the Harken International Match Racing Regatta when she was only fifteen years old. In 2007 and 2008, she competed in the Sydney to Hobart Yacht Race. She was named that 2010 Australian Female Sailor of the Year.

At the 2007 Women's Match Racing World Championships in St Quay, France, Curtis finished second. Her teammates included Nicky Souter and Lucinda Whitty. At the 2009 Women's Match Racing World Championships in Lysikil, Sweden, she earned a gold medal.

In 2011, Curtis, Olivia Price and Lucinda Whitty formed their Elliott 6m team. She competed in the Perth 2011 ISAF Sailing World Championships. Her team finished eighth. At ISAF Nations Cup Grand Final in Sheboygan, her team finished third in match racing. At the 2011 Weymouth & Portland International Regatta in Weymouth, Great Britain, her team finished fifth in match racing. At the 2011 European Championships in Helsinki, Finland, her team finished seventh in match racing. At the 2012 ISAF Sailing World Cup in Weymouth, her team finished first. At the 2012 ISAF Sailing World Cup in Miami, her team finished second. At the 2012 ISAF Sailing World Cup in Spain, her team finished third. She competed in the 2012 ISAF Women's Match Racing World Championship in Gottenburg, Sweden. Going into the event, her team was ranked sixth in the world. With five wins and two losses, her team finished third in their group in the group stage. This was her team's final competition before the Olympics.

Curtis has been selected to represent Australia at the 2012 Summer Olympics in sailing. She was named to the Elliott 6m team in June 2012. In the lead up to the Olympic Games, she participated at a national team training camp at the Australian Institute of Sport's Italian training centre. At the Olympics, the team won the silver medal.
