= Sydney Distance Education High School =

Location
- Woolloomooloo, New South Wales; Australia; 33.871153°S 151.220772°E

Information
- Type: Public secondary school
- Motto: Quality individualised education
- Principal: Mark Piddington
- Relieving Principal: Lisa Keating
- Deputy Principal for Senior School: Julie Kennedy
- Deputy Principal for Year 10: Duncan Gerdes
- Deputy Principal for Junior School: David Tracy
- Teaching staff: 117 (as of 2019)
- Gender: Co-education
- Enrolment: 553 (as of 2019)
- Campus: 38–68 Forbes Street, Woolloomooloo NSW 2011
- Yearbook: Bridging the Distance
- Website: https://sydneyh-d.schools.nsw.gov.au/

Sydney Distance Education High School is a public distance education school in the inner-city suburb of Woolloomooloo in Sydney, Australia. The school is on the same site as the Plunkett Street Public School. It delivers individualised education programs to students in Years 7–12 whose special circumstances prevent them from attending regular schooling. It also provides curriculum delivery to students in Years 9–12 studying a single subject not available at their home school. It uses the decentralised model of distance education, where the form of teaching is determined based on a student's situation. The school caters to students living in the Greater Sydney region.

The school delivers educational services via digital methods, alongside traditional paper work distributed via mail.

Enrolments are open for those in Years 7 to 12:

- Students with a medical condition that prevents them from attending regular schooling
- Pregnant students / young parents
- Vocationally talented students
- Students with significant support needs
- Professional performers and athletes
- Students in special placement settings.

== History ==
In 1884, the Government school system was established to provide educational facilities to all students, including those in rural areas. Until the late 1870s, many children were not able to access education due to geographical isolation, commonly living in impoverished conditions. This was mostly due to the sparse settlement in New South Wales. House to house schools rose in popularity during the 1890s but the minimum enrolment numbers for a school to be viable were proving difficult to reach, causing a decline in the use of the house to house system. The subsidy scheme introduced in 1903 aimed to bring easier access to education for these children by subsidising isolated families so they could afford private teaching. Although the scheme succeeded, there were still children without access to education due to their family's financial circumstances not being able accommodate private teaching despite the subsidy.

Travelling schools were first introduced as an alternative method of public education in 1908. Reports conducted by inspectors for the New South Wales Department of Education in 1912 showed of school aged children living west of the Great Dividing Range, 1014 were not attending school. Due to this, the travelling schools scheme was expanded, announced by the Minister of Public Instruction in 1913. In 1915, there were three travelling schools, with a collective enrolment of 85 students. Travelling schools were predominantly used during World War I (1914–1918) to provide education separate from a physical institution. Work was shared through radio and print. After the war they were closed down. The Department of Education made the decision to suspend travelling schools, replacing them with correspondence schools.The Department of Education opened The Correspondence School in place of travelling schools at the Department's Bridge Street headquarters in 1916 to accommodate students who may struggle with on-campus learning. The majority of schools were located in urban areas, creating geographical difficulty for students living in rural areas attending school. This includes regional areas where 67% of students complete their HSC compared to 81% of urban students. The Department of Education started recommending the Correspondence School to students wanting to enrol in travelling schools and rejected most applications for the establishment of new travelling schools in New South Wales.

As travelling schools closed, The Correspondence School's enrolment numbers increased. The 25 students enrolled at the Inverell Travelling School were transferred to the Correspondence School due to the schools closure in 1921. The school's expansion created the need for a physical location to facilitate the continuation of distance education. This resulted in the Teachers College, now known as the Sydney Distance Education High School, becoming a secondary school in Blackfriars, Sydney in 1922. In 1923, the first Schools for Specific Purpose were established by the Department of Education. These catered for students struggling with disabilities and other circumstances that interrupted their education. Therefore, the Teacher's College was known as a School for Specific Purposes. Enrolment at the Correspondence School reached 2555 students in 1925, with 60 teaching staff. In 1959, enrolment levels began to lower due to improvements in access to traditional education methods, especially for rural students in New South Wales. Students were now given the option to study single subjects through the school, due to the introduction of the Wyndham Scheme in 1961. The scheme created the current (as of 2020) secondary school curriculum where in ‘junior school’ (year 7) students complete a set of common compulsory subjects and in second, third and fourth form (years 8, 9 and 10) they complete a set of compulsory subjects along with two elective subjects. It also introduced new criteria for the School Certificate, received at the end of fifth form (year 11). This scheme led to an increase in enrolments.

In 1965, multiple satellite schools opened in Walgett, Bourke, Cobar and Nyngan and The Correspondence School moved to William Street in Kings Cross. Dover Heights High School became a shared space with the opening of the Sydney Secondary Distance Education Centre in 1999. The school relocated to Forbes Street, Woolloomooloo in 2002 and was renamed Sydney Distance Education High School. The digital learning format of an eLearning Portal as a platform storing school files and accessibility to video chat facilities was used during the coronavirus pandemic in 2020 as an example for educational institutions transferring to online learning.

== Learning Hubs ==
=== Glenbrook ===
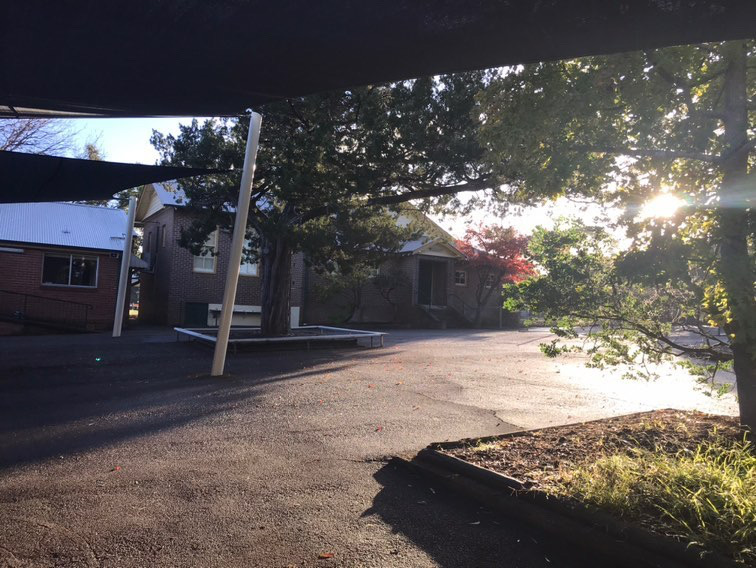
Glenbrook Centre

Glenbrook Centre, 10 Park Street, Glenbrook

The Glenbrook Centre opened in 2013. It is located inside the grounds of Glenbrook Primary School, in the building closest to the school carpark and Ross Street. It is hired out to other schools and educational services. The centre runs mental health programs for high school students in Parramatta to Mount Victoria areas. The Sydney Distance Education High School learning hub is held in the centre on Thursdays during the school term from 9:00 am – 3:00 pm.

=== Ingleburn ===
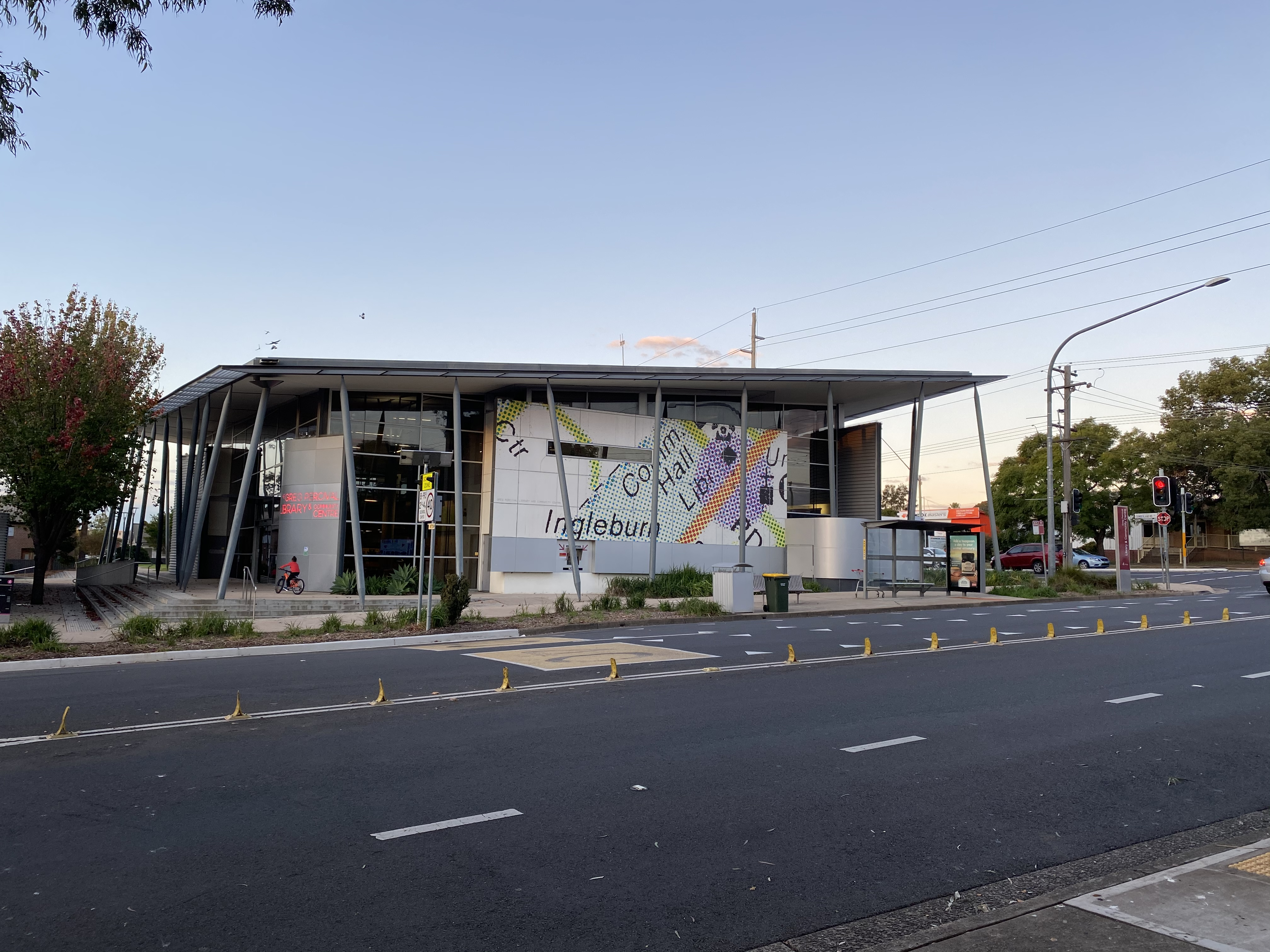
Greg Percival Community Centre

Greg Percival Community Centre, Corner of Oxford Road and Cumberland Road, Ingleburn

The Greg Percival Community Centre is located in the Campbelltown City Council area, adjacent to the Ingleburn Library and near Hallinan Park. It has held functions such as religious or cultural activities, weddings and community groups. The Sydney Distance Education High School learning hub is held in the Community Centre on Tuesdays during the school term from 9:00 am – 3:00 pm.

=== Miranda ===
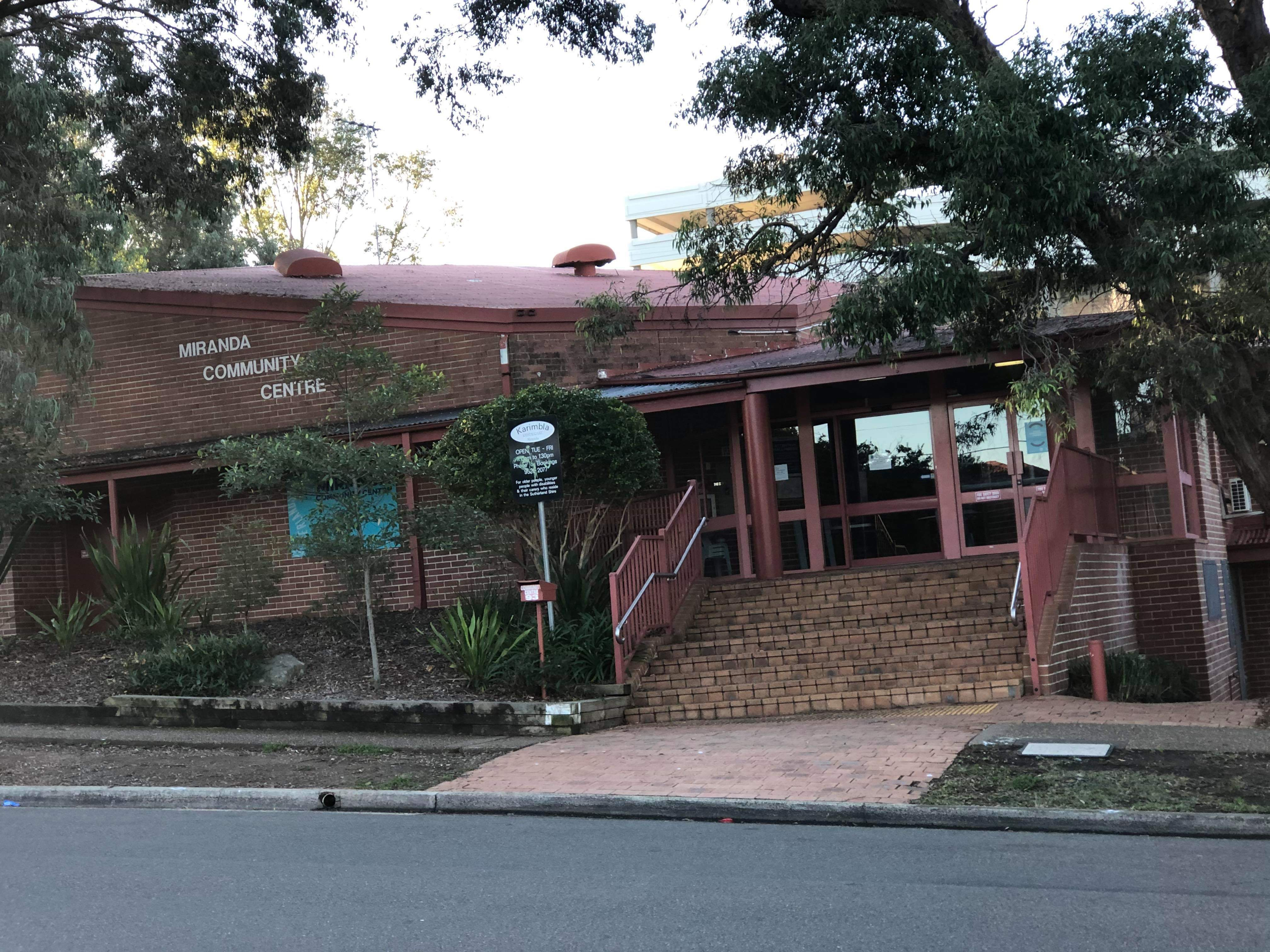
Miranda Community Centre

Endeavour Room of the Miranda Community Centre, 93 Karimbla Rd, Miranda

The Sydney Distance Education High School learning hub is held in the Community Centre on Mondays during the school term from 9:00 am – 3:00 pm.

=== Tuggerah ===
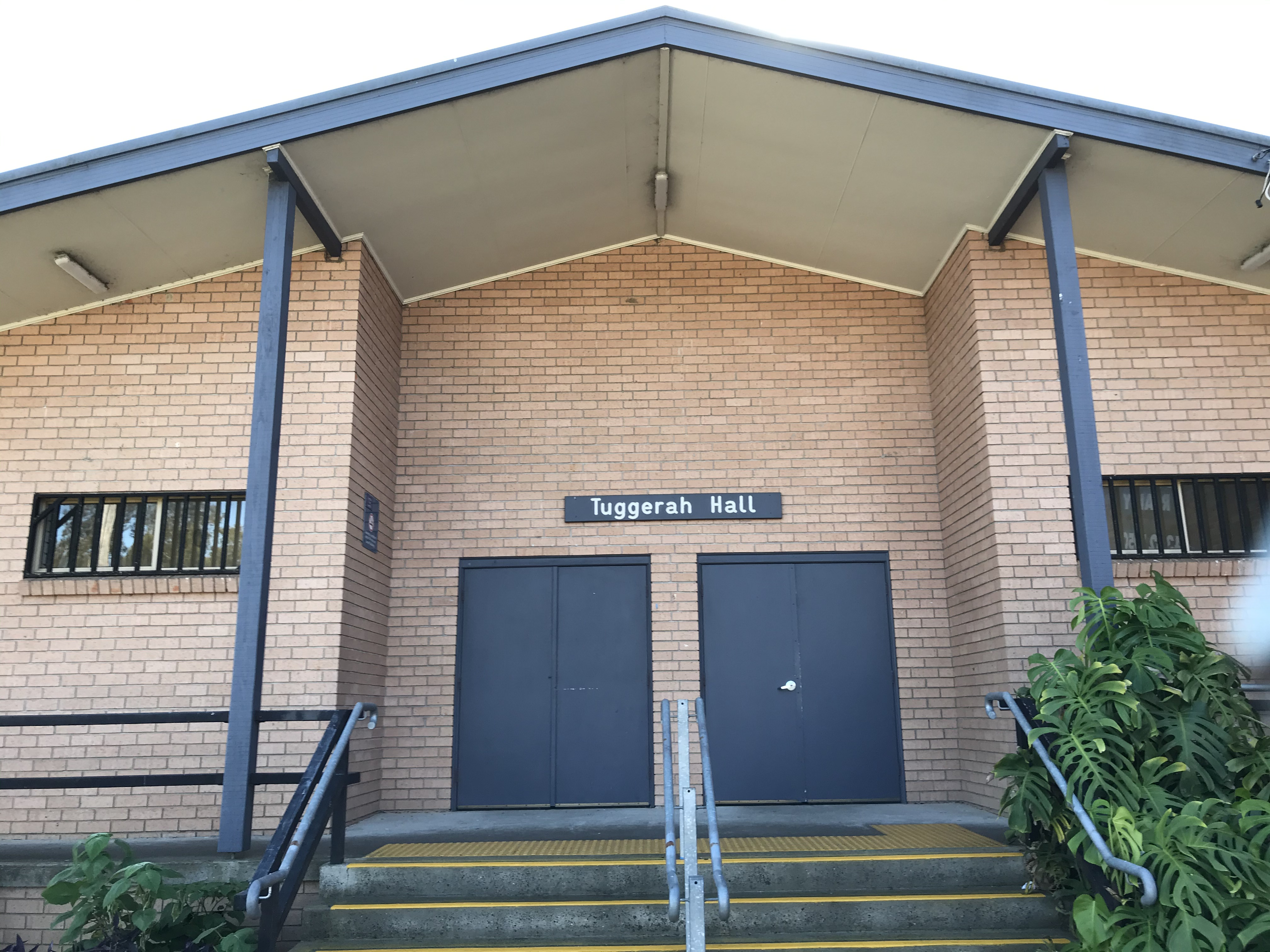
Tuggerah Community Hall

Tuggerah Community Hall, 9 Anzac Rd, Tuggerah

The Sydney Distance Education High School learning hub is held in the Community Hall on Tuesdays during the school term from 9:00 am – 3:00 pm.

=== Woolloomooloo ===
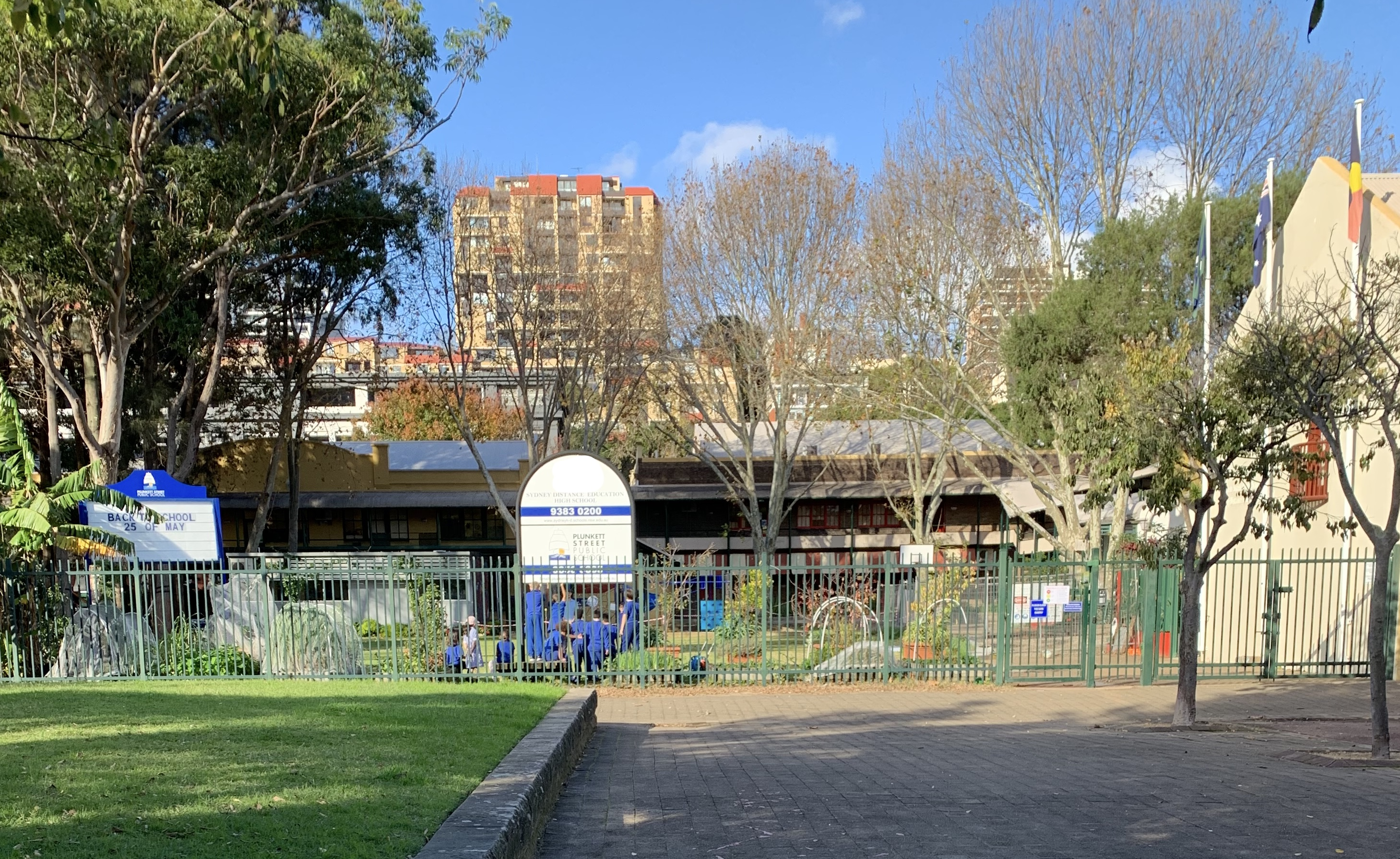
Sydney Distance Education High School

School library, Sydney Distance Education High School

The Sydney Distance Education High School learning hub is held in the school library on Wednesdays from 10:30 am – 2:30 pm and Fridays 9:00 am – 2:30 pm during the school term.

== Subjects ==
Students complete generic compulsory high school subjects in Stages 4–5 as well as a compulsory student wellbeing course. In Stage 5 students also complete two elective courses from a list of general high school electives as well as industrial technology subjects. In Stage 6 students complete one English subject and up to 12 units of other general HSC subjects and/or one of the Vocational Education and Training (VET) courses offered by the school. For a full list of subjects see the Enrolment Application Form for Years 7–12.

== Notable alumni ==
Name	Occupation	Summary
Daniel Alessi	Soccer Player	Alessi made his A-League debut with the Western-Sydney Wanderers in 2015 at the age of 16. Alessi has played for multiple Australian and English teams as well as an Italian team. Alessi started playing for his current (as of April 2020) team, FC Hereford, in March 2020.
Brothers3 Makirum Fahey-Leigh Tayzin Fahey-Leigh Shardyn Fahey-Leigh	Boyband (Country music)	The trio competed in season 11 of the Australian TV singing competition the X-Factor in 2014, placing 3rd. The trio released their first album in January 2016 titled Brothers Never Part.
Brendan Kerry	Olympic figure skater	Kerry made his Olympic debut at the 2014 Sochi Winter Olympic Games, competing in the Men's Individual Figure Skating Event. He was 19 at the time. Kerry competed again in the PyeongChang 2018 Winter Olympic Games. Kerry completed two different quadruple turns, making him the first and only Australian to do so.
Cheltzie Lee	Olympic Figure Skater	Lee came 6th in the 2007 Australian Youth Olympic Festival at the age of 15. Lee earned her personal best score while competing in Vancouver in the 2009 Four Continents Competition. Lee was a competitor for Australia in the women's solo figure skating event in the 2010 Olympics in Vancouver.
Olivia Price	Olympic Sailor	Price has been the youngest competitor in the ISAF World Cup Women's Match Racing Tour since 2008. Price and her team beat the Netherlands and Finland in the ‘round robin stage’ and gained a position in the gold medal race. Price made her Olympic debut at the 2012 London Summer Olympic Games. She was 19 at the time. That year, she won the silver medal in the Elliot 6m Match Racing event.
Jack Vidgen	Singer	Vidgen won season 5 of the Australia's Got Talent TV competition in 2011 at age 14. Vidgen competed in season 8 of the Australian TV singing competition The Voice in 2019. He made it to ‘The Finals’ round of the competition. Vidgen sang alongside ten other Australian competitors in the 2020 Eurovision Song Contest, placing 8th.
