= Helsinki City Marathon =

Annual footrace in Helsinki, Finland

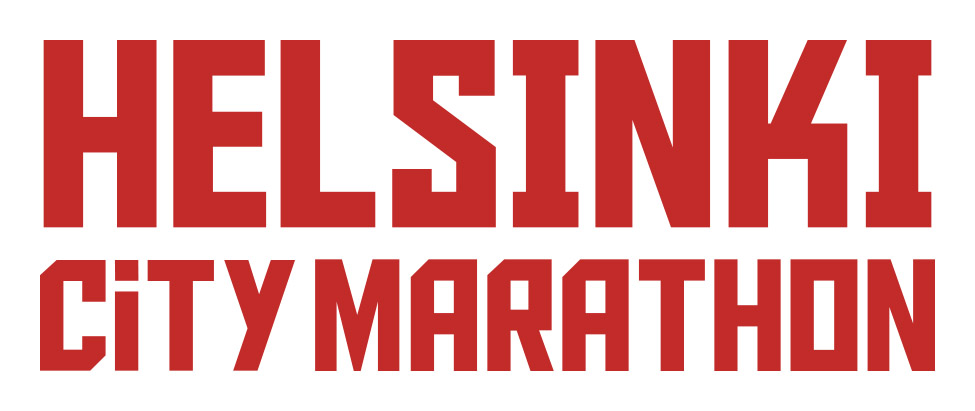
- Date: May
- Location: Helsinki, Finland
- Event type: Road
- Distance: Marathon, Half marathon, 5K run
- Established: 1981
- Course records: Men: 2:12:47 (1993) (Spain) Martín Fiz; Women: 2:36:14 (1991) (Soviet Union) Albina Galimova
- Website: Helsinki City Marathon
- Participants: 15,000 (2023)

The Helsinki City Marathon is an annual marathon held in Helsinki, Finland. It has been held since 1981 and is the largest marathon event in the country. It is approved by the World Athletics federation as a standard long-distance race. While earlier it was held in August, it has been moved to May since 2018 to be conducted on the "Helsinki City Running Day". The event was held in October in 2020 and 2021 as an exception due to COVID-19 pandemic.

== History ==
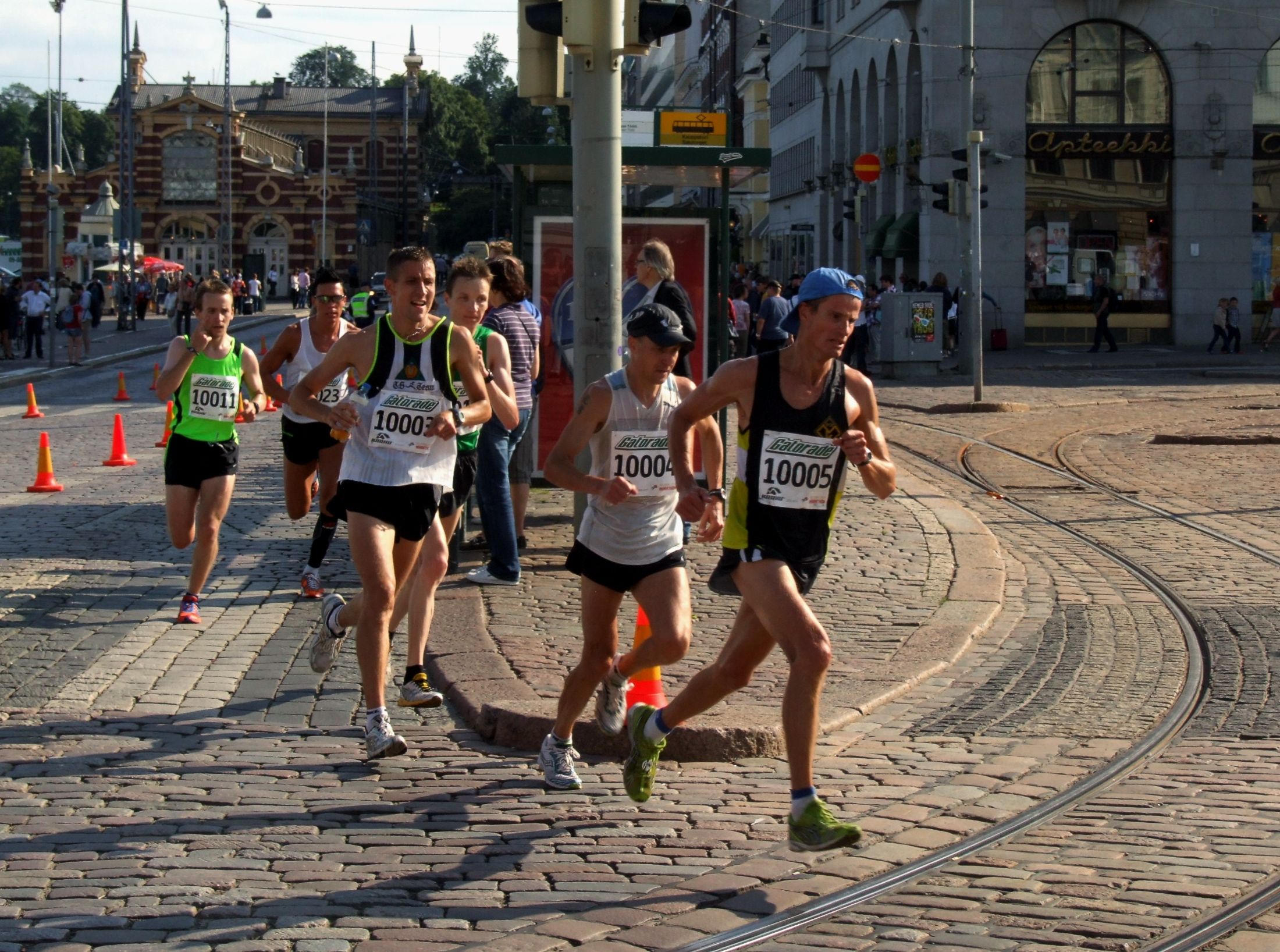
Runners in the 2011 Helsinki City Marathon.

The first edition of the Helsinki City Marathon was held on 26 July 1981 and was won by Sinikka Toropainen and Günther Mielke. The largest marathon event in the country, it was held in August every year. It is approved by the World Athletics federation as a standard long-distance race. The half marathon Helsinki City Run has been held since 1994. Since 2018, the event has been conducted in May annually on the day called "Helsinki City Running Day". In 2020, the race was postponed due to the coronavirus pandemic and was held on 3 October on the same year. Similarly, the same happened in 2021, when the event was held on the 2nd of October.

== Events and course ==
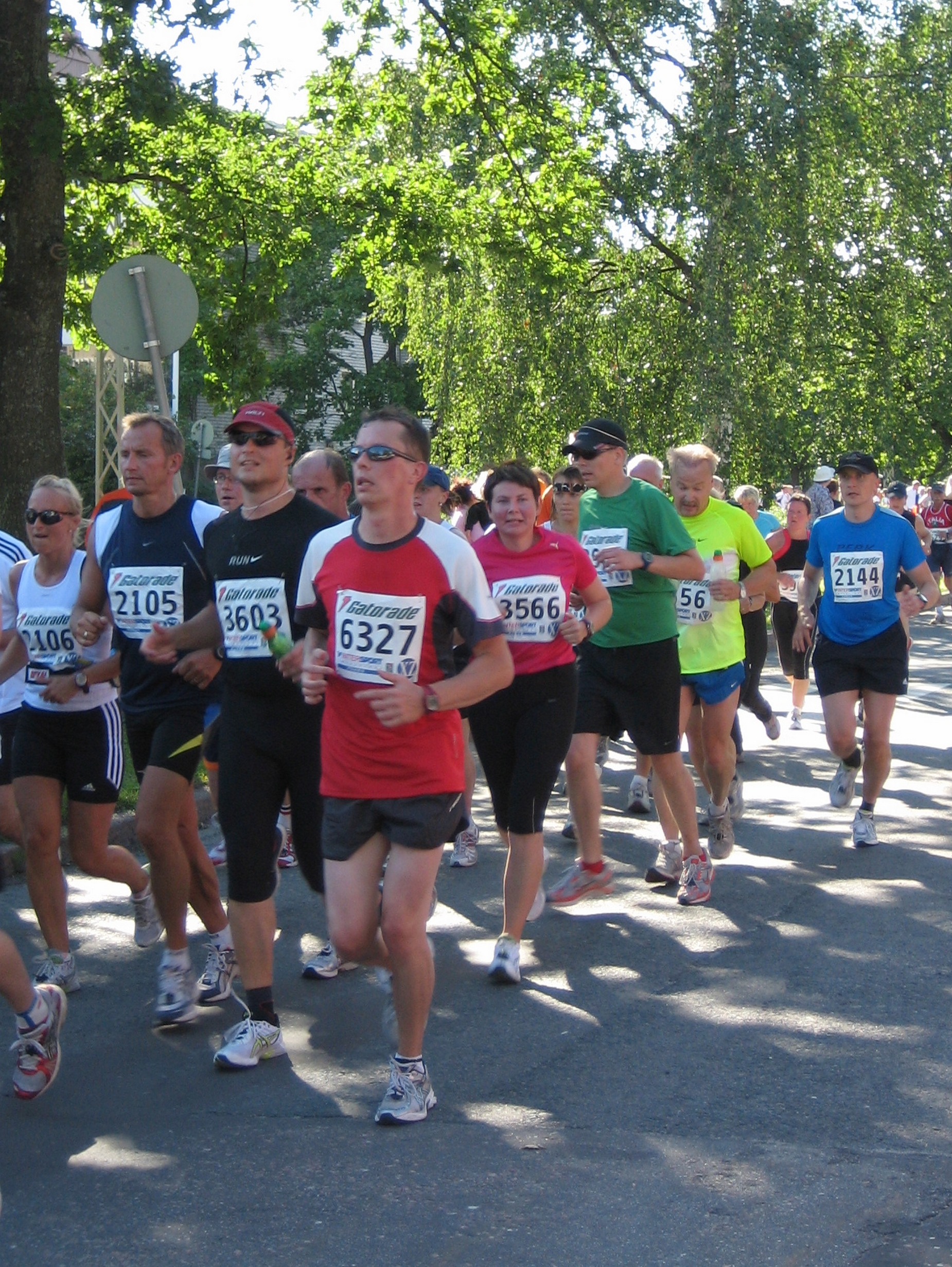
Participants in the Helsinki City Marathon in 2007.

Apart from the main marathon event, other events include half marathon, relay, 5K run and miniathon. The relay event consists of four legs 12.8 km, 8.8 km, 12.3 km and 8.3 km respectively with transition areas Meilahti, Opera House, and again in Meilahti and is run by a team of four runners.

The events usually start near the statue of Paavo Nurmi located in the Mäntymäentie street. The course runs through the appropriate distance various parks along the route, traverses along the Baltic Sea coastline, before reaching the city centre. The races usually end at the Helsinki Olympic Stadium, which also hosts the refreshment areas. The marathon route usually traverses at sea level with a highest altitude of 32 m (105 ft) and an average altitude of 8 m (26 ft). Only about 1.1% of the route has a steep uphill gradient along the 42.2 km (26.2 mi) course. The temperature ranges from 13–18 °C (55–64 °F) during the race.

== Participation and prizes ==
The racers are allowed to participate in different age categories apart from the open category. A participation fee is charged based on the event concerned. About 15,000 participants raced in the event in 2023. Participants are allowed to participate in multiple events including the double of marathon and half-marathon called the "Helsinki City Double.

Cash prizes are awarded for top three finishers overall, and the best placed finishers across various age groups and other specified categories. All finishers of the event within a specified time limit (six hours for marathon race) are awarded a participation medal, and other memorabilia. Racers who clock a finishing time less than 2 hours 20 minutes (men) and 2 hours 40 minutes (women) are awarded an additional cash prize of €500 each.

== Winners ==
Key: Course record

=== Men ===
Year	Athlete	Country	Time
1981	Günter Mielke	Germany	2:23:35
1982	Dominique Chauvelier	France	2:17:02
1983	Francisco Medina	Spain	2:25:39
1984	Niilo Kemppe	Finland	2:20:41
1985	Jorma Sippola	Finland	2:15:36
1986	Tommy Persson	Sweden	2:17:11
1987	Douglas Orr	Sweden	2:19:57
1988	Douglas Orr	Sweden	2:16:43
1989	Jouni Kortelainen	Finland	2:18:58
1990	Alexandr Beljajew	Soviet Union	2:14:36
1991	Anatoliy Korepanov	Soviet Union	2:18:06
1992	Aleksandr Belyayev	Russia	2:20:39
1993	Martín Fiz	Spain	2:12:47
1994	Zerehune Gizaw	Ethiopia	2:20:18
1995	Tesfaye Bekele	Ethiopia	2:16:59
1996	Julius Mitibani	Tanzania	2:19:00
1997	Julius Mitibani	Tanzania	2:18:07
1998	Julius Mitibani	Tanzania	2:21:24
1999	Pavel Loskutov	Estonia	2:19:18
2000	Nikolaos Polias	Greece	2:18:46
2001	Daniel Komen	Kenya	2:18:43
2002	Sebastian Panga	Tanzania	2:18:39
2003	Giorgio Calcaterra	Italy	2:20:55
2004	Dmitry Kondrashov	Russia	2:21:29
2005	Vener Kashayev	Russia	2:20:07
2006	Francis Wachira	Kenya	2:18:26
2007	Peter Biwott	Kenya	2:20:31
2008	Johnstone Chebii	Kenya	2:24:31
2009	Pavel Andreev	Russia	2:22:34
2010	Gezahagne Girma	Ethiopia	2:22:36
2011	Dominic Ondoro	Kenya	2:23:24
2012	Titus Kurgat	Kenya	2:22:45
2013	Hosea Kiplagat	Kenya	2:22:26
2014	Justus Kiprono	Kenya	2:20:42
2015	Hiroki Nakajima	Japan	2:38:25
2016	Robert Magut	Kenya	2:27:31
2017	Robert Magut	Kenya	2:27:40
2018	Robert Magut	Kenya	2:29:42
2019	Robert Magut	Kenya	2:27:09
2020	Joni Hirvikallio	Finland	2:29:47
2021	Eric Mangeh	Cameroon	2:21:37
2022	Oscar Holmström	Finland	2:24:57
2023	Eric Mangeh	Cameroon	2:26:14
2024	Oscar Holmström	Finland	2:24:10
2025	Jack Nixon	United Kingdom	2:25:17
2026	Kari Heikura	Finland	2:21:06

=== Women ===
Year	Athlete	Country	Time
1981	Sinikka Torpainen	Finland	2:53:15
1982	Sinikka Torpainen	Finland	2:41:18
1983	Sinikka Keskitalo	Finland	2:39:43
1984	Diane Palmason	Canada	2:48:21
1985	Irmeli Ruponen	Finland	2:50:56
1986	Sinikka Torpainen	Finland	2:49:00
1987	Marita Yli-ilkka	Finland	2:41:53
1988	Ritva Lemettinen	Finland	2:42:35
1989	Ritva Lemettinen	Finland	2:40:32
1990	Swetlana Netschajewa	Soviet Union	2:39:03
1991	Albina Galimova	Soviet Union	2:36:14
1992	Garifa Baijanova	Kazakhstan	2:42:41
1993	Anne Jääskeläinen	Finland	2:43:32
1994	Sylvia Renz	Germany	2:41:30
1995	Roza Vladimirova	Russia	2:54:03
1996	Svetlana Netchaeva	Russia	2:47:38
1997	Galina Zhulyeva	Ukraine	2:41:38
1998	Tatyana Maslova	Russia	2:45:30
1999	Tatyana Maslova	Russia	2:47:10
2000	Tatyana Zolotareva	Russia	2:44:31
2001	Tatyana Zolotareva	Russia	2:45:56
2002	Tatyana Zolotareva	Russia	2:50:10
2003	Tatyana Zolotareva	Russia	2:57:03
2004	Jennifer Lotoiywo	Kenya	2:57:31
2005	Minna Kainlauri	Finland	3:00:29
2006	Haile Kebebush	Ethiopia	2:52:47
2007	Flora Kandie	Kenya	2:51:05
2008	Margarita Plaksina	Russia	2:40:47
2009	Margarita Plaksina	Russia	2:45:28
2010	Leena Puotiniemi	Finland	2:49:11
2011	Leena Puotiniemi	Finland	2:38:05
2012	Salome Biwott	Kenya	2:41:54
2013	Leena Puotiniemi	Finland	2:42:03
2014	Natalya Starkova	Russia	2:37:56
2015	Elina Junnila	Finland	2:54:13
2016	Anna Herzberg	Germany	2:56:29
2017	Anastasia Zakharova	Russia	3:06:44
2018	Katarina Skräddar	Finland	2:54:45
2019	Katarina Skräddar	Finland	2:50:56
2020	Soili Kosonen	Finland	2:55:28
2021	Aleksandra Borodinova	Russia	2:43:22
2022	Annemari Kiekara	Finland	2:41:11
2023	Petra Kilpeläinen	Finland	2:47:54
2024	Koleta Moravcová	Czech Republic	3:07:15
2025	Eira Rapp	Norway	2:48:30
2026	Petra Kilpeläinen	Finland	2:46:34

== See also ==
- Paavo Nurmi Marathon
