= Zerehune Gizaw =

Ethiopian long-distance runner

Personal information
- Nationality: Ethiopian
- Born: 21 March 1965 (age 61)

Sport
- Sport: Long-distance running
- Event: Marathon

Zerehune Gizaw (born 21 March 1965) is an Ethiopian long-distance runner. He competed in the men's marathon at the 1992 Summer Olympics, finishing in 61st place with a time of 2:28:25. He was the winner of the Amsterdam Marathon in 1990 and the Helsinki City Marathon in 1994.
