= Helsinki City Half =

Annual half marathon in Helsinki, Finland

- Date: May
- Location: Helsinki, Finland
- Event type: Half marathon
- Distance: 21.0975 km
- Primary sponsor: OP Uusimaa
- Established: 1994
- Last held: 2025-05-17
- Website: https://helsinkicityrun.fi/en/helsinkicityrun-halfmarathon/

Helsinki City Half formerly known as Helsinki City Run, is an annual half marathon that takes place every May as a road running event around the streets and parks of Helsinki. Starting in 1994 and organised by Finnish Athletics Federation, the race has become popular over the years, attracting a record number of 17,000 participants in 2013.

== Winners ==
Key: Course record

=== Men ===
Year	Athlete	Country	Time
2019	Ibrahim Mukunga Wachira	Kenya	1:10:24
2020	Aki Nummela	Finland	1:09:51
2021	Dmitrijs Serjogins	Latvia	1:05:03
2022	Ibrahim Mukunga Wachira	Finland	1:07:58
2023	Solomon Gachoka Kagimbi	Kenya	1:06:19
2024	Solomon Boit	Kenya	1:04:25
2025	Jussi Utriainen	Finland	1:06:50

=== Women ===
Year	Athlete	Country	Time
2019	Elena Tolstykh	Russia	1:19:45
2020	Maria Söderström	Finland	1:19:48
2021	Suvi Miettinen	Finland	1:15:33
2022	Alisa Vainio	Finland	1:12:46
2023	Nataliia Semenovych	Ukraine	1:15:25
2024	Alisa Vainio	Finland	1:13:40
2025	Nataliia Semenovych	Ukraine	1:16:46

== See also ==
- Helsinki City Marathon
