= Leena Puotiniemi =

Finnish long-distance runner

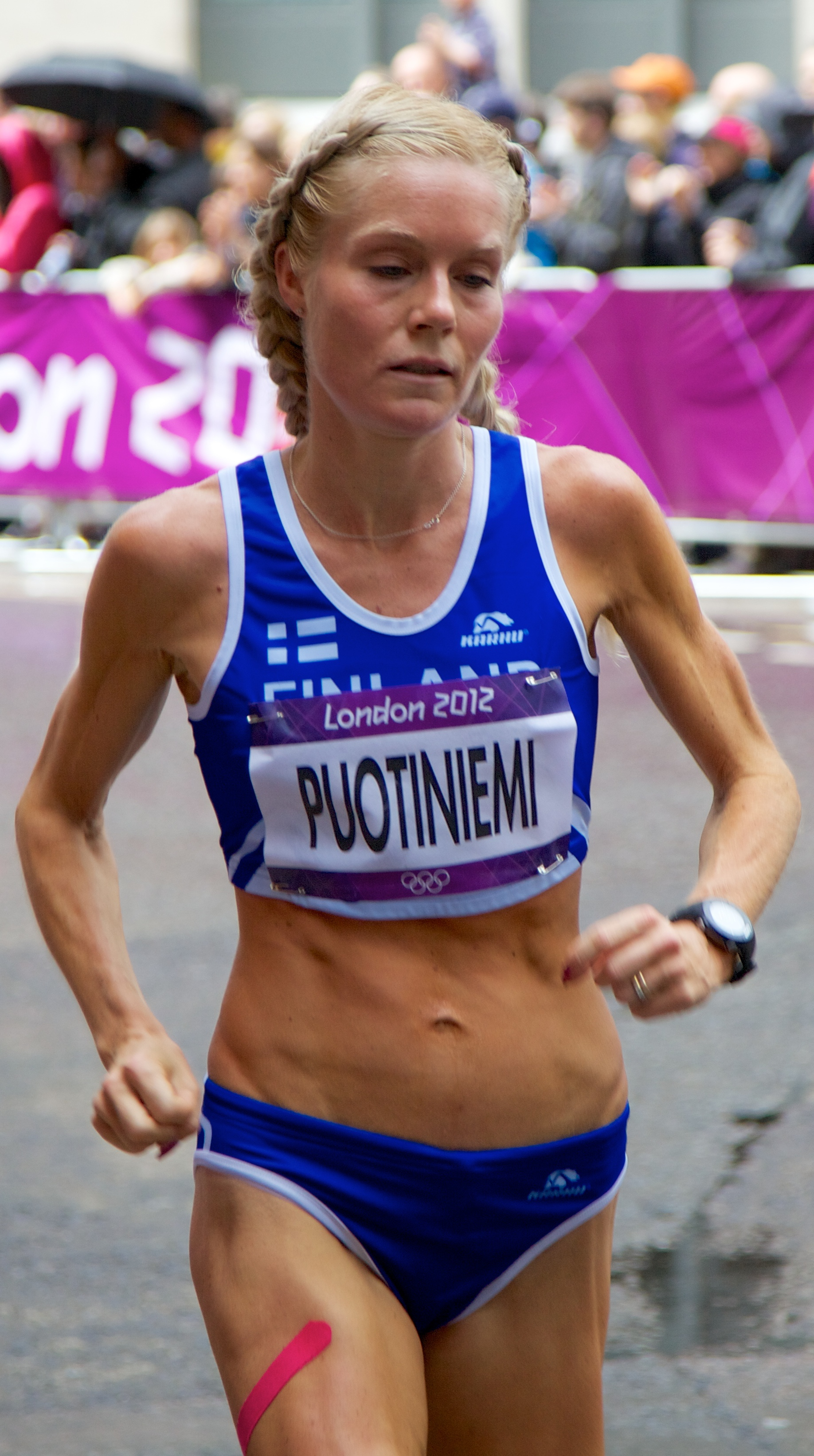
- Leena Puotiniemi in 2012

Personal information
- Born: March 19, 1976 (age 50) Helsinki, Finland
- Height: 1.70 m (5 ft 7 in)
- Weight: 52 kg (115 lb)

Sport
- Country: Finland
- Sport: Athletics
- Event: Marathon
- Club: IF Länken
Medal record
Helsinki City Marathon
Gold medal – first place	2010	Women
Gold medal – first place	2011	Women
Gold medal – first place	2013	Women

Leena Puotiniemi (born 19 March 1976) is a Finnish long-distance runner. She competed in the marathon at the 2012 Summer Olympics, placing 87th with a time of 2:42:01. Puotiniemi won the 2010, 2011 and 2013 Helsinki City Marathon.
