= Olivia Price =

Australian sailor

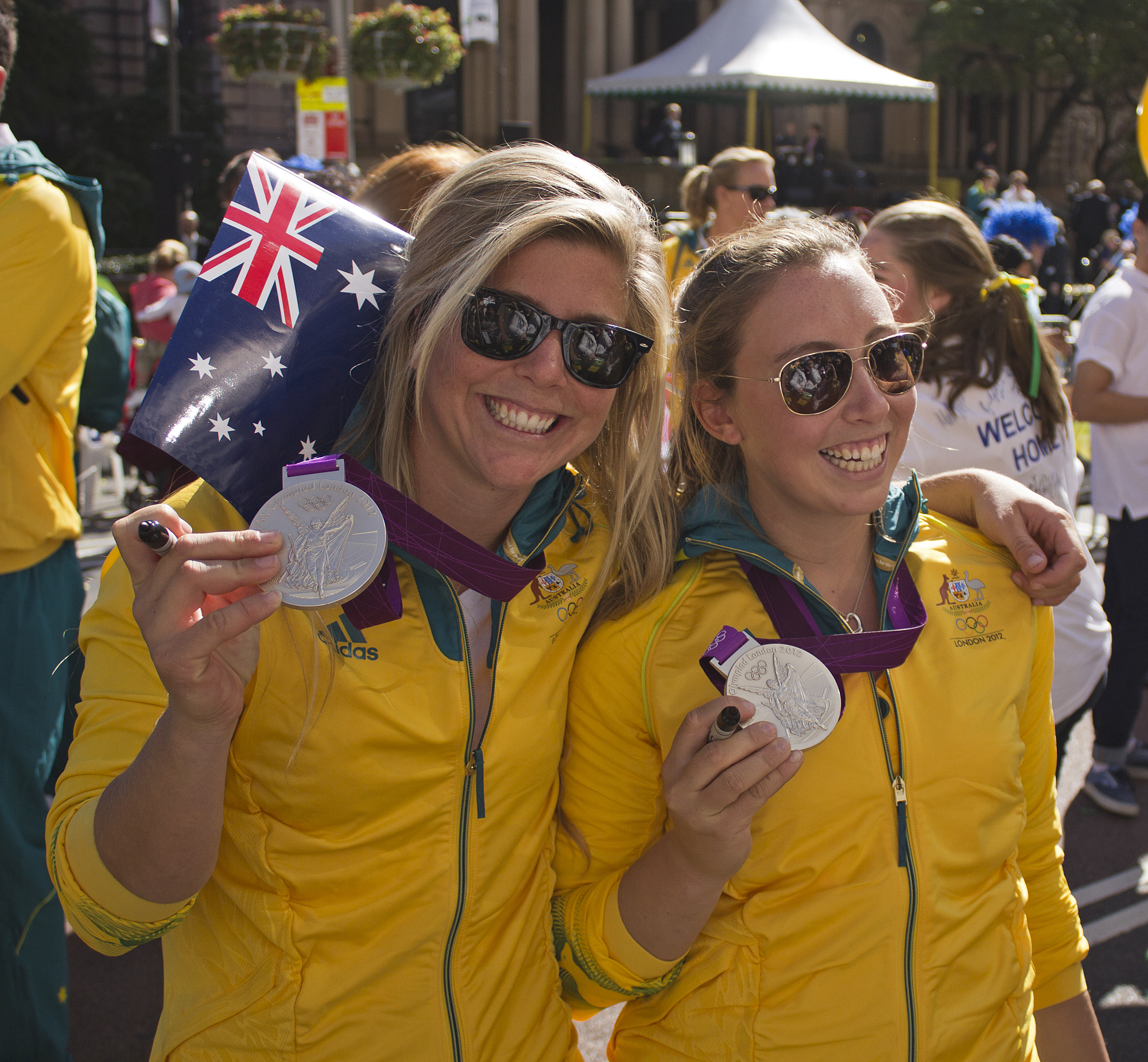
- Nina Curtis and Olivia Price (on the right) at the Welcome Home parade in Sydney

Personal information
- Nationality: Australian
- Born: 2 August 1992 (age 34) Sydney
- Height: 164 cm (5 ft 5 in) (2012)
- Weight: 68 kg (150 lb) (2012)

Sport
- Country: Australia
- Sport: Sailing
- Event: Elliott 6m — Women
Medal record
Olympic Games
Silver medal – second place	2012 London	Elliott 6m

Olivia Price (born 2 August 1992) is an Australian sailor. She represented Australia at the 2012 Summer Olympics in sailing, and won a silver medal.

== Personal life ==
Price was born on 2 August 1992 in Sydney and is from Drummoyne. She attended Drummoyne Public School before going to high school at St Catherines School then Sydney Distance Education High School. She chose distance education in order to allow herself more time to compete and train, finally earning her HSC in 2011. As of 2012, she lives in Sydney, and is part of The University of Sydney's Elite Athlete Program.

Price is 164 centimetres (65 in) tall and weighs 68 kilograms (150 lb).

== Sailing ==
Price is a sailor, serving as a bowman and skipper. She has been coached by Euan McNicol since 2010. Her primary training base is Sydney, with a secondary training base in Weymouth. She is a member of the Middle Harbour Yacht Club. She has a sailing scholarship from the Australian Institute of Sport and New South Wales Institute of Sport.

In 2008, as a sixteen-year-old, Price started competing in the ISAF World Cup Women's Match Racing Tour where she was the youngest woman in the competition, a title she held into 2012. She was ranked the ISAF Women's World Ranking's number one bowman in 2010. In 2010, as a crew member, she came in first at the 2010 Australian National Open Match Racing Champion and, as skipper, came in first at the 2010 Australian Women's Match Racing Champion. At 2010 ISAF Sail for Gold World Cup in Weymouth, she earned a gold medal. At the ISAF 2010 Women's Match Racing World Championships in Newport, Rhode Island, her team finished third. In the Women's Match Racing Team category for the ISAF World Ranking List, her team was ranked first in 2010.

In 2011, Price, Nina Curtis, and Lucinda Whitty formed their Elliott 6m team, skippering the team from the start. She competed in the Perth 2011 ISAF Sailing World Championships. Her team finished eighth. At ISAF Nations Cup Grand Final in Sheboygan, her team finished third in match racing. At the 2011 Weymouth & Portland International Regatta in Weymouth, Great Britain, her team finished fifth in match racing. At the 2011 European Championships in Helsinki, Finland, her team finished seventh in match racing. At the 2012 ISAF Sailing World Cup in Weymouth, her team finished first. At the 2012 ISAF Sailing World Cup in Miami, her team finished second. At the 2012 ISAF Sailing World Cup in Spain, her team finished third. She competed in the 2012 ISAF Women's Match Racing World Championship in Gottenburg, Sweden. Going into the event, her team was ranked sixth in the world. With five wins and two losses, her team finished third in their group in the group stage. This was her team's final competition before the Olympics.

Price has been selected to represent Australia at the 2012 Summer Olympics in sailing as the team's skipper. She was named to the Elliott 6m team in June 2012. She was the youngest member of Australia's sailing team. In the lead up to the Olympic Games, she participated at a national team training camp at the Australian Institute of Sport's Italian training centre. She went into London knowing that if she earned a medal, she would be the youngest female ever to earn one in the event.

She was not selected for the 49erFX class at the 2016 Summer Olympics in Rio de Janeiro and took a five-year break from sailing.

Price teamed up with Evie Haseldine in September 2021. Together they finished 10th sailing in the 49erFX class at the Olympic Test Event, held in Marseille in July 2023. Coached by Victor Paya, they subsequently won bronze at the 2023 Sailing World Championships, winning Australia a place in the 2024 Paris Olympic Games.
