= Lucinda Whitty =

Australian sailor

Personal information
- Nickname: Lu
- Nationality: Australian
- Born: 9 November 1989 (age 36) Sydney
- Height: 167 cm (66 in) (2012)
- Weight: 63 kg (139 lb) (2012)

Sport
- Country: Australia
- Sport: Sailing
- Event: Elliott 6m — Women
Medal record
Olympic Games
Silver medal – second place	2012 London	Elliott 6m

Lucinda Whitty (born 9 November 1989) is an Australian sailor. She represented Australia at the 2012 Summer Olympics in sailing.

== Personal ==
Nicknamed Lu, Whitty was born on 9 November 1989 in Sydney. Jeremy Whitty is her father and has competed in several sailing races. She has siblings and they are active in competitive sailing. She attended Lane Cove Public School before going to high school at SCEGGS Darlinghurst. She enrolled at the University of Technology, Sydney in 2008 and as of 2012 was working on a Bachelor of Business. As of 2012, she lives in Sydney.

Whitty is 167 centimetres (66 in) tall and weighs 63 kilograms (139 lb).

== Sailing ==
Whitty is a sailor, acting as a bowman. As a five-year-old, she started participating in the sport. The boat she competes in is Only Racing and is operated by teammate Olivia Price. Her primary training base is Sydney, with a secondary training base in Weymouth. She is a member of the Middle Harbour Yacht Club. She has a sailing scholarship from the Australian Institute of Sport and New South Wales Institute of Sport.

Whitty made her Australian national team debut at the 2007 Youth Olympic Festival. At the 2009 ISAF Women's Match Racing Championship, she came in first. She competed in the 2009 ISAF Match Racing World Championships with Nicky Souter, and came away with a first-place finish. In 2010, she was named the Australian Female of the Year Sailor. The same year, she earned the title of Australian University Female Sportswoman of the year and the 2010 Female Sailor of the Year.

In 2011, Whitty, Nina Curtis and Olivia Price formed their Elliott 6m team in response to an announcement that the class of boat would be an Olympic event in London. She competed in the Perth 2011 ISAF Sailing World Championships. Her team finished eighth. At ISAF Nations Cup Grand Final in Sheboygan, her team finished third in match racing. At the 2011 Weymouth & Portland International Regatta in Weymouth, Great Britain, her team finished fifth in match racing. At the 2011 European Championships in Helsinki, Finland, her team finished seventh in match racing. At the 2012 ISAF Sailing World Cup in Weymouth, her team finished first. At the 2012 ISAF Sailing World Cup in Miami, her team finished second. At the 2012 ISAF Sailing World Cup in Spain, her team finished third. She competed in the 2012 ISAF Women's Match Racing World Championship in Gottenburg, Sweden. Going into the event, her team was ranked sixth in the world. With five wins and two losses, her team finished third in their group in the group stage. This was her team's final competition before the Olympics.

Whitty was selected to represent Australia at the 2012 Summer Olympics in sailing. She was named to the Elliott 6m team in June 2012. In the lead up to the Olympic Games, she participated at a national team training camp at the Australian Institute of Sport's Italian training centre. In the 2012 games, Whitty, Curtis and Price got a silver medal for Australia.
