= Silja Kanerva =

Finnish sailor (born 1985)

Personal information
- Nationality: Finnish
- Born: 28 January 1985 (age 41) San Diego, United States
- Height: 166 cm (5 ft 5 in)
- Weight: 67 kg (148 lb)

Sailing career
- Sport: Sailing
- Club: Nyländska Jaktklubben
- Classes: 49er FX, Elliott 6m, Yngling, 29er, Sonar
Medal record
Women's sailing
Representing Finland
Olympic Games
Bronze medal – third place	2012 London	Elliott 6m

Silja Kanerva (born 28 January 1985 in San Diego, United States) is a Finnish sailor who took part in the Elliott 6m competition at the 2012 Summer Olympics. She was in the crew led by Silja Lehtinen and accompanied by Mikaela Wulff who earned the bronze medal.
