= Mikaela Wulff =

Finnish sailor (born 1990)

Personal information
- Nationality: Finnish
- Born: 24 April 1990 (age 36) Helsinki, Finland
- Height: 183 cm (6 ft 0 in)
- Weight: 68 kg (150 lb)

Sailing career
- Sport: Sailing
- Club: Helsingfors Segelsällskap
- Classes: 470, 49er FX, Elliott 6m, Sonar
Medal record
Women's sailing
Representing Finland
Olympic Games
Bronze medal – third place	2012 London	Elliott 6m

Mikaela Wulff (born 24 April 1990 in Helsinki) is a Finnish sailor who participated in the Elliott 6m competition at the 2012 Summer Olympics. She was in a crew led by Silja Lehtinen along with Silja Kanerva and finished in 3rd place, achieving bronze medal.
