= Silja Lehtinen =

Finnish Olympic sailor (born 1985)

Personal information
- Nationality: Finnish
- Born: 5 November 1985 (age 40) Helsinki, Finland

Sailing career
- Sport: Sailing
Medal record
Sailing
Representing Finland
Olympic Games
| Bronze medal – third place | 2012 London | Elliott 6m |
Byte World Championship
| Gold medal – first place | 2001 | Byte World Championship |
- Updated on 19 August 2012

Silja Lehtinen (born 5 November 1985 in Helsinki) is a Finnish sailor.

Silja Lehtinen has sailed in two Olympic regattas. In 2008, at the age of 23, she skippered the Finnish team in the Yngling class to an 11th place. In 2012, she participated in Women's Match Race (Elliott 6m) and won a bronze medal with her crew, Silja Kanerva and Mikaela Wulff.

In 2012 as well, only a month before the Olympic regatta, Lehtinen and her crew won match race world championship title in Gothenburg, Sweden.

Her brother Lauri skippered the Finnish 49er into seventh place at the 2012 Olympic regatta.

As a 15 year old, she won the Byte class World Championship in 2001.

Lehtinen studies medicine at the University of Helsinki.
