= Ángela Pumariega =

Spanish yacht racer

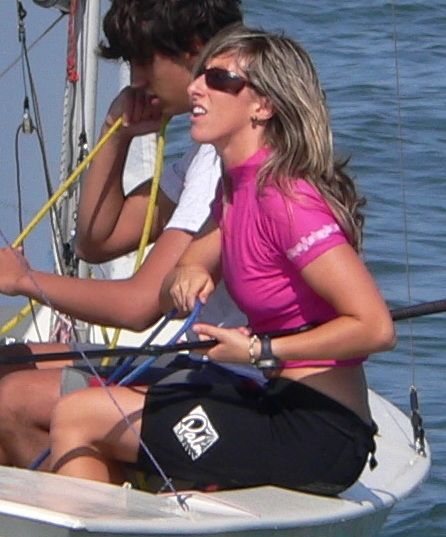
- Pumariega sailing her Snipe in Gijón, 2007

Personal information
- Full name: Ángela Pumariega Menéndez
- Nationality: Spanish
- Born: 12 November 1984 (age 41) Gijón, Spain
- Height: 165 cm (5 ft 5 in)
- Weight: 58 kg (128 lb)

Sport
- Country: Spain
- Sport: Sailing
- Club: Real Club Astur de Regatas
Medal record
Women's sailing
Representing Spain
Olympic Games
Gold medal – first place	2012 London	Elliott 6m

Ángela Pumariega Menéndez (Note: In this Spanish name, the first or paternal surname is Pumariega and the second or maternal family name is Menéndez.) (born 12 November 1984 in Gijón) is a Spanish sailor. She won the gold medal in sailing at the 2012 Summer Olympics in the Elliott 6m class, in the crew led by Támara Echegoyen and accompanied by Sofía Toro.

Previously, she was a junior Spanish champion and second at the Europeans in the Snipe class in 2002 and second at the Spanish women's nationals in 2008 also in Snipe.

Since May 2019, Pumariega acts as councilor in the city hall of Gijón after contesting as independent for the lists of the People's Party of Asturias in the local elections.

== See also ==
- List of Olympic medalists in sailing
