= French Sailing Federation =

Sports governing body in France

Fédération Française de Voile FFV
- IOC nation: FRA
- Sport: Sailing
- Official website: www.ffvoile.net

HISTORY
- Year of formation: 1946

AFFILIATIONS
- International federation: World Sailing (WS)
- WS members page: www.sailing.org/about-isaf/mna/france.php

ELECTED
- President: Jean-Luc DENECHAU

SECRETARIAT
- Address: Paris
- Secretary General: Anne Dos Santos

The French Sailing Federation (French: Fédération Française de voile, FFV) is recognised by World Sailing as the governing body for the sport of sailing in France.

== History ==
The federation was originally called the Fédération de yachting à voile.

== Classes ==
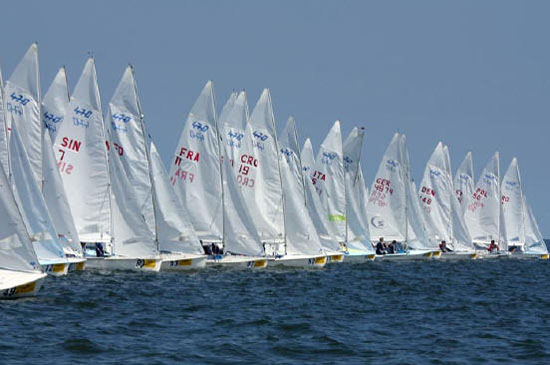
470s in 2008

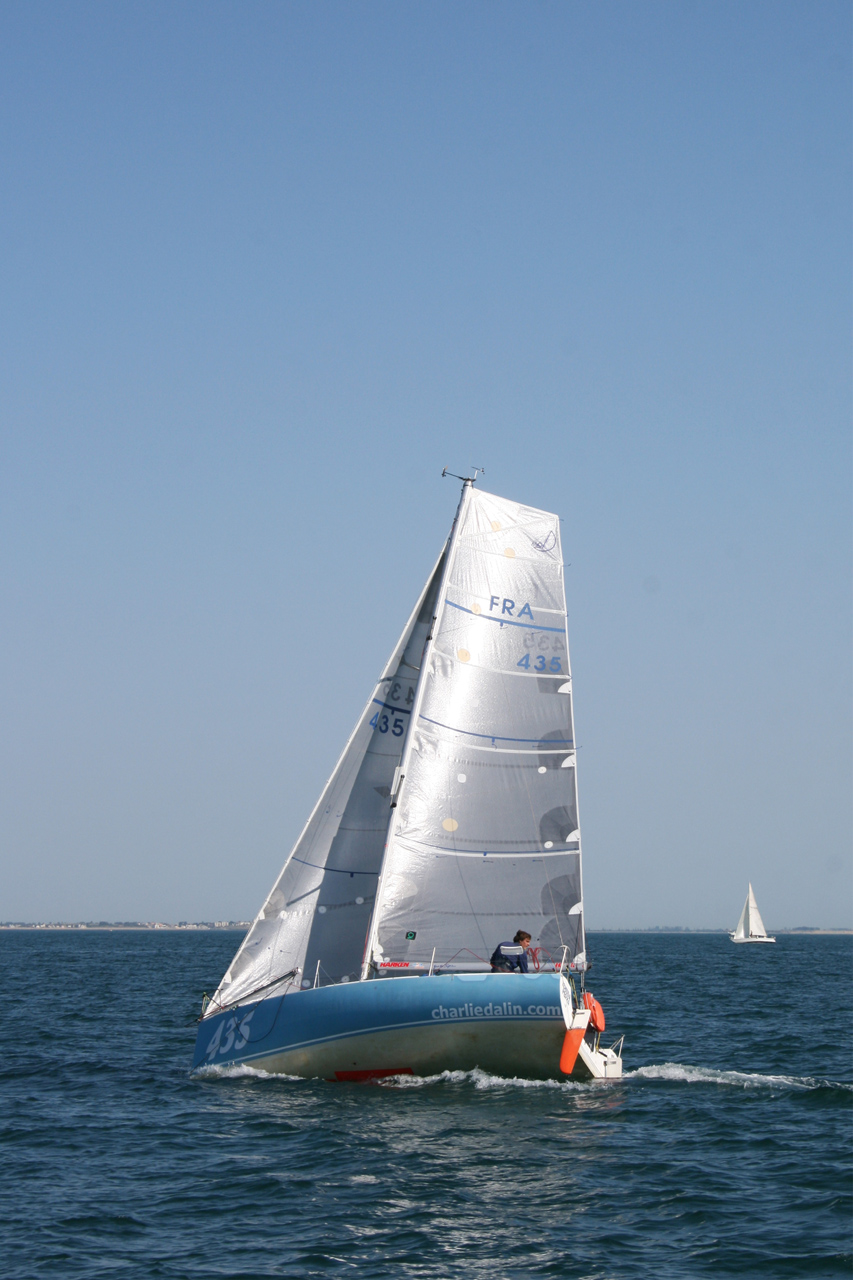
Mini Transat 6.50 in 2009

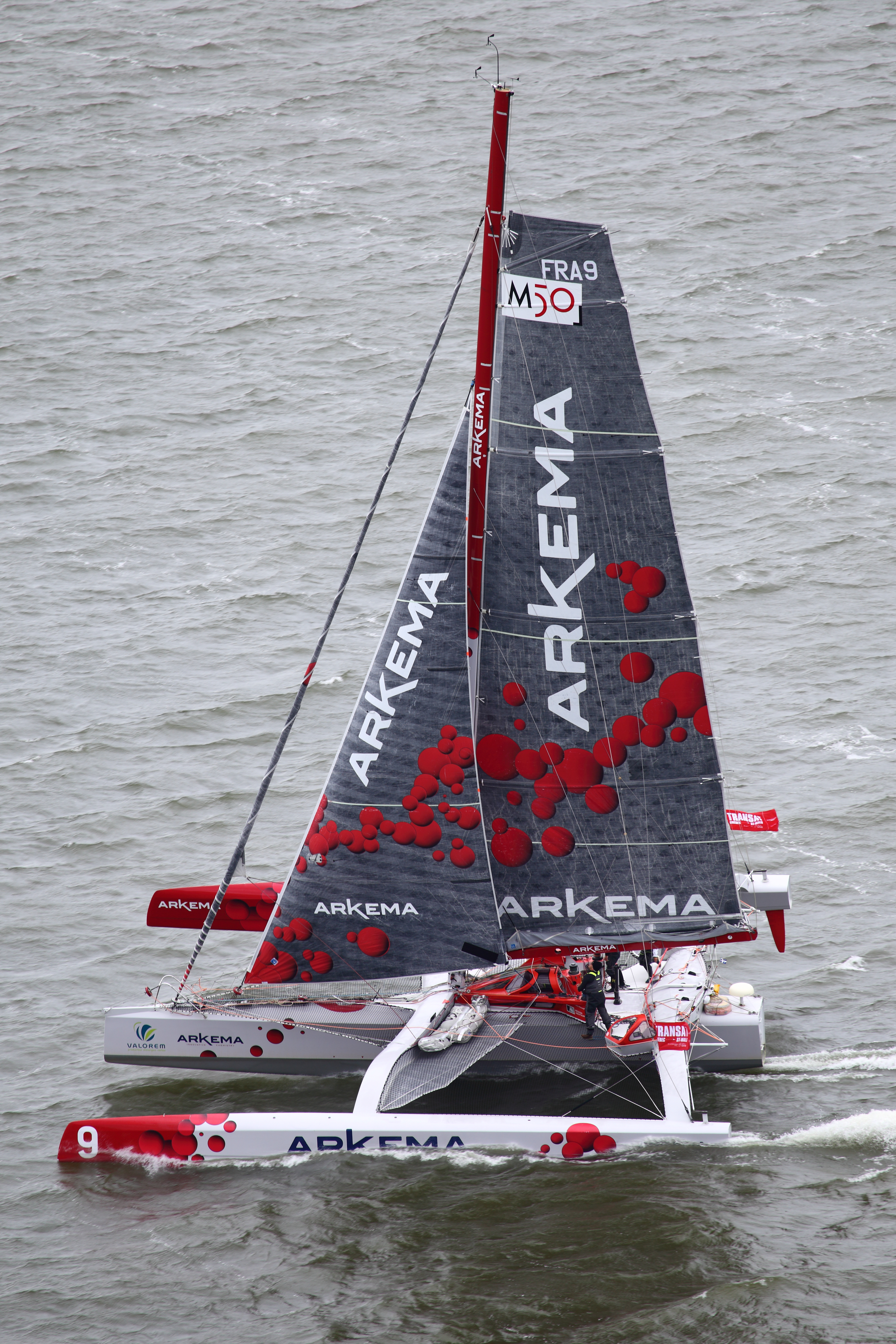
Ocean Fifty Arkema in 2016

The following class organisations are affiliated to the French Sailing Federation:

- 12 foot dinghy
- 2.4 Metre
- 29er
- 31.7 Attitude
- 420
- 470
- 5.5 Metre
- 505
- 590
- Aile
- Archambault Grand Surprise
- Asso 4000
- Beneteau Figaro
- Beneteau Figaro 2
- Beneteau First 18 SE
- Boss, Buzz, and ISO
- Cap Corse
- Class40
- Classic A-class catamaran
- Contender
- Cormoran
- Corsaire
- Dart 18
- DF 95
- Dragon
- Europe
- Farr 30
- Finn
- Fireball
- Flibustier
- Flying Fifteen
- Flying Phantom
- Formula 16
- Formula 18
- Fun
- Hansa (2.3, 303, and Liberty)
- Hobie (14, 16, Tiger, Wildcat)
- ILCA (4, 6, and 7) – France
- ILCA (4, 6, and 7) – New Caledonia
- IMOCA 60
- International A-class catamaran
- International Funboard
- International Marblehead
- J/105
- J/111
- J/22
- J/24
- J/70
- J/80
- Jet
- L'Équipe
- Longtze
- Maraudeur
- Mattia Esse Sport
- Melges 24
- Micro
- Microsail
- Mini JI
- Mini Transat 6.50
- Modèle de l'America's Cup
- Monotype 7m50
- Moth
- Muscadet
- Neo 495
- Neptune 5.50
- Neptune 6.25
- Nitro 80
- O'pen Skiff
- Ocean Fifty
- OK
- One Metre
- Onefly
- Open 5.00
- Open 570
- Optimist
- Ponant
- Raceboard
- RC Laser
- Requin
- RG 65
- Sailing skate
- Saintoise
- SB20
- Selection 37
- Snipe
- Soling
- Speed Feet 18
- Spitfire
- Star
- Sun Fast 30 One Design
- Surprise 25
- Tempest
- Tornado
- Ultim
- Vaurien
- Vent d'Ouest
- Viper
- Waszp
- Wētā Trimaran
- Windsurfer
- Windy
- Wingfoil
- Yachts de tradition
