= German Sailing Federation =

Governing body of sailing in Germany

German Sailing Federation DSV
- IOC nation: Germany (GER)
- Sport: Sailing
- Official website: www.dsv.org

HISTORY
- Year of formation: 1888

DEMOGRAPHICS
- Membership size: 188000

AFFILIATIONS
- International federation: World Sailing (WS)
- WS members page: www.sailing.org/about/members/mnas/germany.php
- National Olympic Committee: Deutscher Olympischer Sportbund
- National Paralympic Committee: National Paralympic Committee Germany

ELECTED
- President: Mona Küppers

SECRETARIAT
- Address: Gruendgensstrasse 18; D-22309 Hamburg
- Country: Germany
- Secretary General: Goetz-Ulf Jungmichel
- Olympic team manager: Nadine Stegenwalner
- Technical Manager: Boris Hepp

The German Sailing Federation (German: Deutscher Segler-Verband, DSV) is the national governing body for the sport of sailing in Germany, recognised by World Sailing.

== History ==
In 1888 the German Sailing Association was founded as the first chairman Adolpf Burmester. At the offices of the Norddeutscher Regatta Verein (North German Regatta Association) in Hamburg met as official founding clubs: Norddeutscher Regatta Verein, Kaiserlicher Yacht Club (Imperial Yacht Club), Verein Seglerhaus am Wannsee (Wannsee Sailors House Association), Segelclub Rhe (Sailing Club Rhe – Königsberg), Berlin Sailing Club, Berlin Regatta Club, Academic Sailors Club (Berlin), Spandauer Yacht-Club, Berlin Yacht Club, Hamburg Elbsegel Regatta Association, and St Georger Segel Verein (St George Sailing Association – Sankt Georgen an der Gusen). In the year 1933 the DSV was subject to Gleichschaltung. At the same time the Freier Segler Verband (Free Sailors' Association), founded in 1901 by workers was renamed and later wrapped up. 1934 saw the liquidation of the Deutscher Seglerbund (German Sailors' Federation) DSB, by which the DSV became the only sailing association in Germany.

== Classes ==
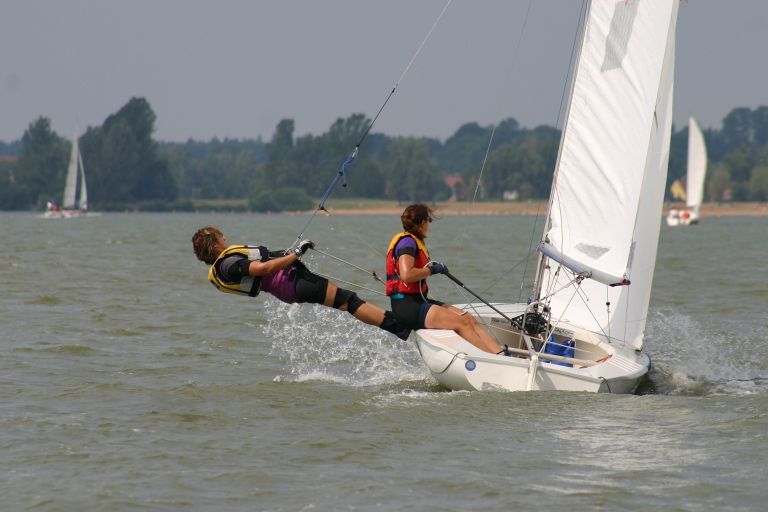
Korsar in 2006

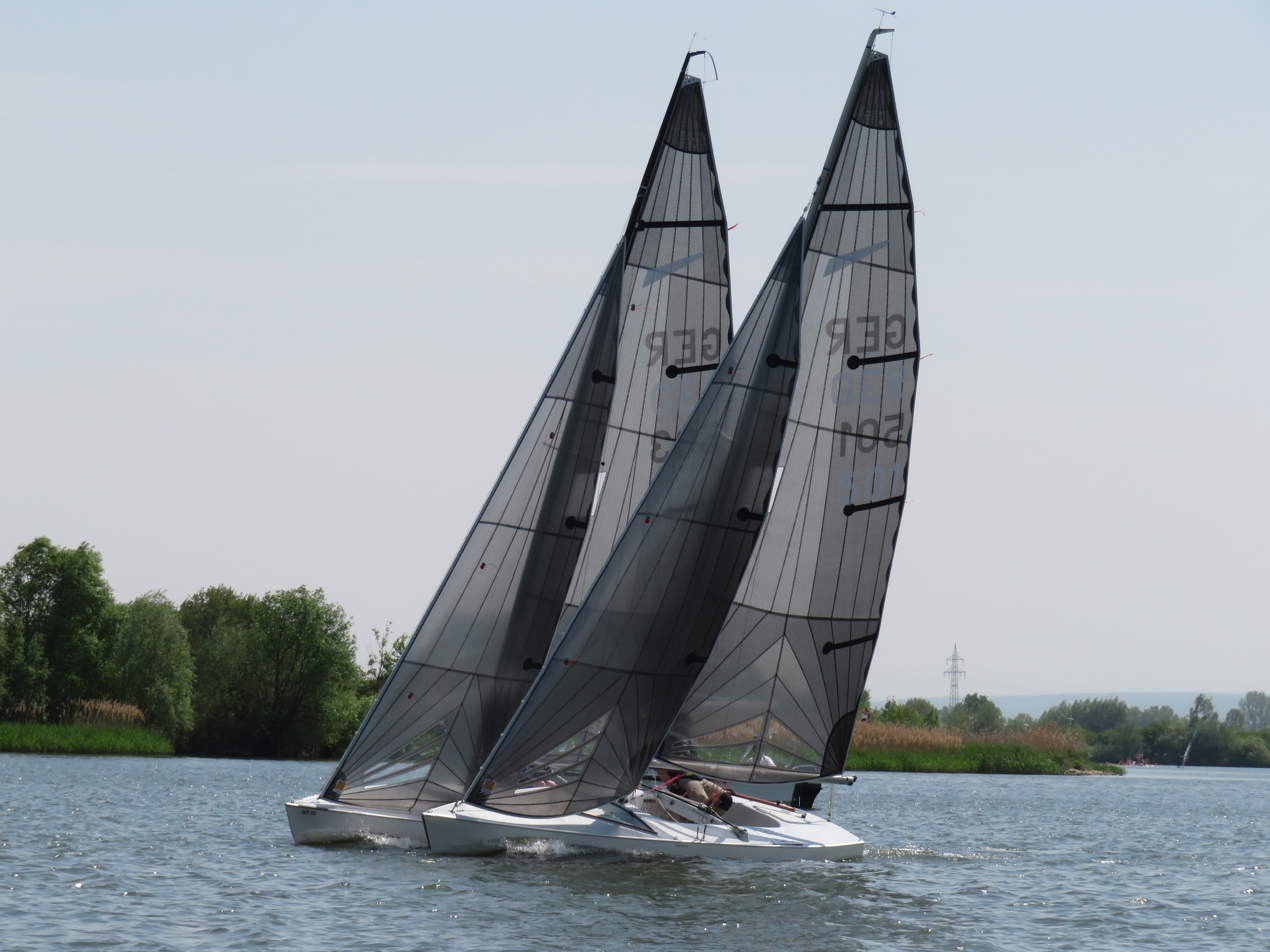
Monas in 2018

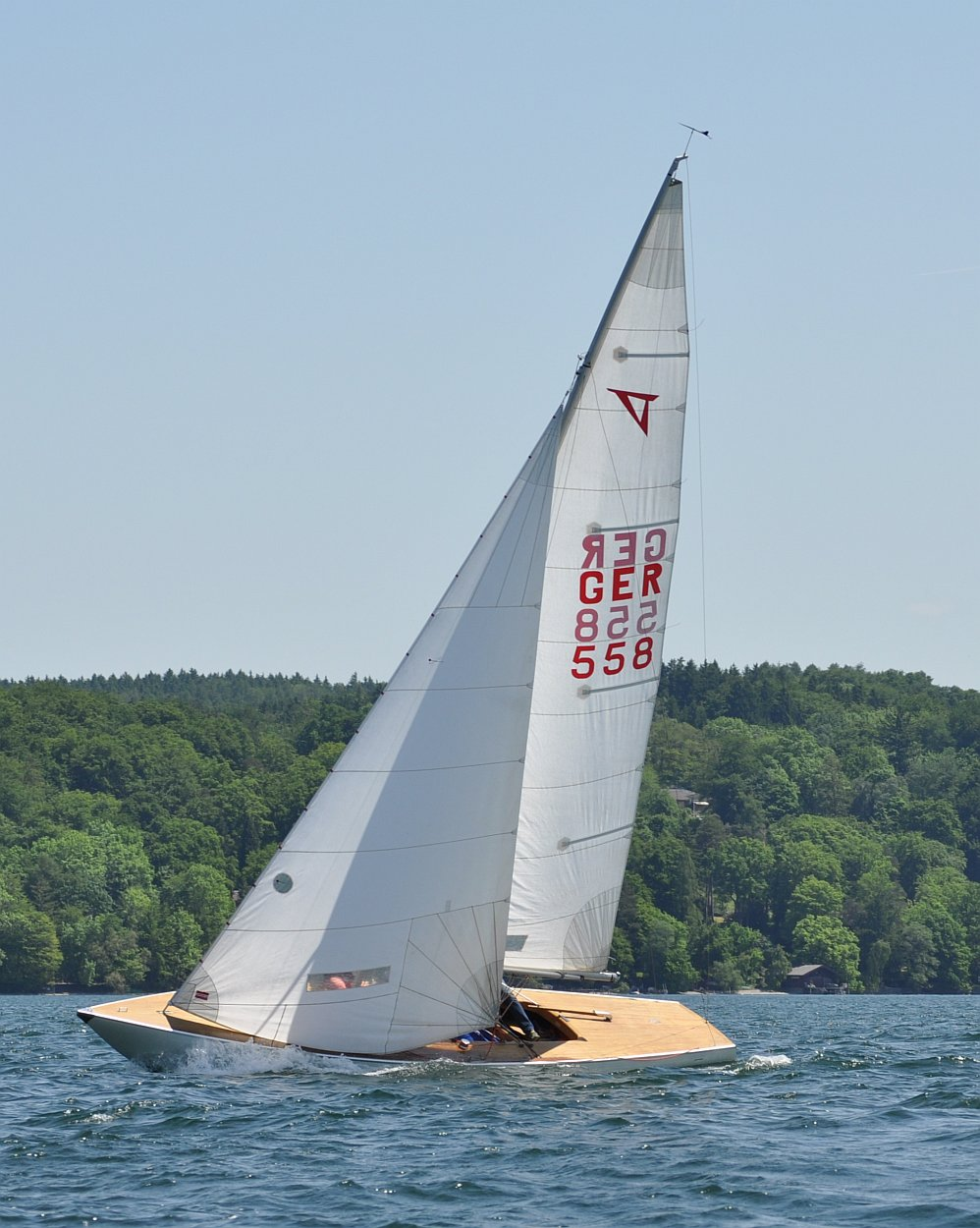
Trias in 2012

The following class organisations are affiliated to the German Sailing Federation:

- 12 m^{2} Sharpie
- 15 qm Jollenkreuzer
- 16 qm Jollenkreuzer
- 2.4 Metre
- 20 qm Jollenkreuzer
- 20 qm Rennjolle
- 22 qm Rennjolle
- 29er
- 30 qm Binnenkiel
- 30 m^{2} skerry cruiser
- 420
- 470
- 49er
- 5.5 Metre
- 505
- Albin Express
- Albin Vega
- Aquila
- Ballad 30
- Beneteau First 18 SE
- Cadet
- Conger
- Contender
- Dart 18
- Dragon
- Dyas
- Efsix
- Europe
- Fam
- Fighter
- Finn
- Flying Dutchman
- Formula 18
- Fun
- H-boat
- H-Jolle
- Hansa-Jolle
- Hobie Cat
- IF-boat
- ILCA (4, 6, and 7)
- International 14
- International 806
- International A-class catamaran
- International FJ
- Ixylon
- J/22
- J/24
- J/70
- Javelin
- Jeton
- Kielzugvogel
- Korsar
- Laser 2
- Lis (6.0, Family, Jolle, Jollenkreuzer)
- Melges 24
- Micro
- Monarch
- Monas
- Moth
- Nacra 17
- Neptun 22
- Nordic Folkboat
- O-Jolle
- O'pen Skiff
- OK
- Optimist
- Pirate
- RS Aero
- Sailhorse
- Skerry cruisers
- Schwertzugvogel
- Seggerling
- Shark 24
- Soling
- Splash
- Star
- Teeny
- Tempest
- Tempo
- Topcat
- Tornado
- Trias
- Varianta
- Vaurien
- VB-Jolle
- X-79
- X-99
- Yngling

== People ==
=== Presidents ===
- 1888 – Founding President Adolph Burmester
- 1912 – Carl Busley
- 1928–1932 – William Rakenius – sailing club house on the Wannsee
- 1932 – Dr. E. Koebke
- 1933 – Kewisch leader of the DSV for the DC circuit, followed by Unfug, then Kewisch again
- 1949 – First President GEWES after World War II. 1951 recovery in the ISAF
- 1956 – Fischer
- 1973–1985 – Kurt Pochhammer
- 1985–1993 – Hans-Otto Schumann – Hamburger Segel-Club
- 1993–2001 – Hans-Joachim (Hajo) – Fritze North German Regatta Association
- 2001–2005 – Dierk Thomsen – Kieler Yacht-Club
- 2005 to present – Rolf Bähr – sailing club house on the Wannsee

== Yacht clubs ==
See Category:Yacht clubs in Germany

== Notable sailors ==
See Category:German sailors

=== Olympic sailing ===
See Category:Olympic sailors for Germany

=== Offshore sailing ===
See Category:German sailors (sport)
