= J/92s =

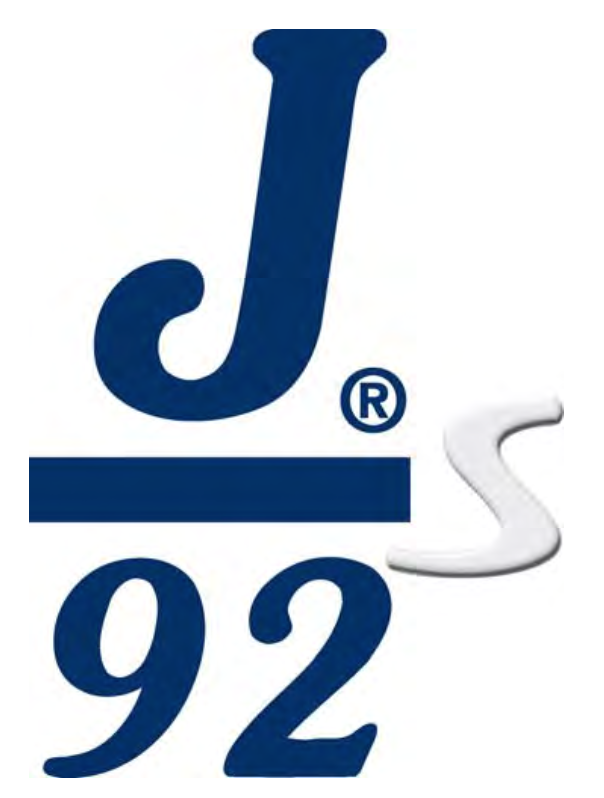

Development
- Designer: Rod Johnstone
- Year: 2005
- Design: One-Design
- Builder: J/Boats
- Name: J/92s

Boat
- Crew: Typically 1 – 6
- Draft: 1.9 m (6 ft 3 in)

Hull
- Type: sloop, monohull, keelboat
- Construction: fiberglass
- Engine: Volvo Penta D1-13

Hull appendages
- Keel: Fixed

Rig
- Rig type: Fractional rig
- I foretriangle height: 12.45 m (40.8 ft)
- J foretriangle base: 3.5 m (11 ft)
- P mainsail luff: 11.85 m (38.9 ft)
- E mainsail foot: 4.25 m (13.9 ft)

Sails
- Mainsail area: 29 m^{2} (310 sq ft)
- Jib/genoa area: 28.5 m^{2} (307 sq ft)
- Spinnaker area: 89 m^{2} (960 sq ft)

Racing
- PHRF: 99 (triangular) / 102 (WWD/LWD)

The J/92s is a fixed keel one-design sportsboat. It was built for J/Boats by J/Composites in Europe and is certified for offshore sailing.

== Design ==
The J/92s was designed by Rod Johnstone as an offshore Class B sailboat according to the European Union Recreational Craft Directive.

While the J/92s shares the hull shape and interior layout of the J/92, it has been optimized for racing with masthead spinnakers, a non-overlapping headsail, a deeper keel and a 33 in (84 cm) longer cockpit.

== Construction ==
The hull is made from a balsa-GRP sandwich laminate with uniaxial and bidirectional cloths. It is molded in one piece. The deck is made from a fiberglass-balsa sandwich laminate. The keel is bolted to the hull, with the help of a stainless steel backing plate which is then laminated with epoxy to the hull. The bowsprit is made of carbon fiber. The rudder is made from GRP on an F16Ph stainless steel rudder stock.
