= J30 =

J30 may refer to:

== Vehicles ==
Automobiles

- Honda J30, an automobile engine
- Infiniti J30, a Japanese luxury car
- Nissan J30, a Japanese sedan
- Toyota Land Cruiser (J30), a Japanese off-road vehicle

Boats

- J/30, keelboat

Locomotives

- GSR Class J30, an Irish steam locomotive

== Other uses ==
- Pentagonal orthobicupola, a Johnson solid (J_{30})
- Rhinitis
- Westinghouse J30, a turbojet engine
- J30 index, a stock index tracking the Tokyo Stock Exchange
