= J/35 =

Sailboat class

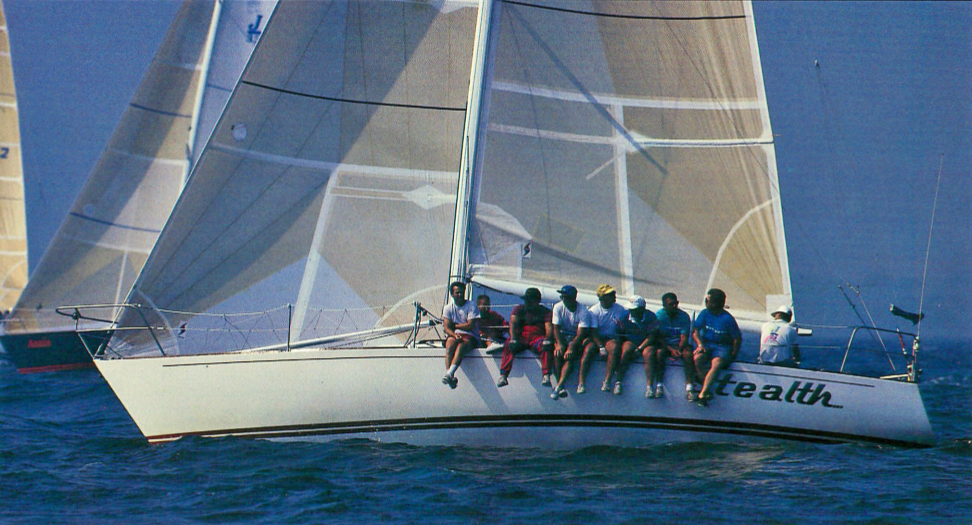

Development
- Designer: Rod Johnstone
- Location: United States
- Year: 1983
- No. built: 330
- Builders: J/Boats (Tillotson Pearson); Sydney Yachts/ Bashford International
- Role: Racer
- Name: J/35

Boat
- Displacement: 10,500 lb (4,763 kg)
- Draft: 6.90 ft (2.10 m)

Hull
- Type: Monohull
- Construction: Fiberglass with balsa core
- LOA: 35.50 ft (10.82 m)
- LWL: 30.00 ft (9.14 m)
- Beam: 11.80 ft (3.60 m)
- Engine: Yanmar 30 hp (22 kW) diesel engine

Hull appendages
- Keel: fin keel
- Ballast: 4,400 lb (1,996 kg)
- Rudder: internally-mounted spade-type rudder

Rig
- Rig type: Bermuda rig
- I foretriangle height: 46.60 ft (14.20 m)
- J foretriangle base: 14.80 ft (4.51 m)
- P mainsail luff: 41.60 ft (12.68 m)
- E mainsail foot: 14.00 ft (4.27 m)

Sails
- Sailplan: Masthead sloop
- Mainsail area: 291.20 sq ft (27.053 m^{2})
- Jib/genoa area: 344.84 sq ft (32.037 m^{2})
- Total sail area: 636.04 sq ft (59.090 m^{2})

Racing
- PHRF: 72

The J/35 is an American sailboat that was designed by Rod Johnstone as a racer and first built in 1983.

== Production ==
The design was built by Tillotson Pearson for J/Boats in the United States and also by Sydney Yachts/Bashford International in Australia, between 1983 and 1992. A total of 330 boats were completed, with only a few built in Australia.

== Design ==
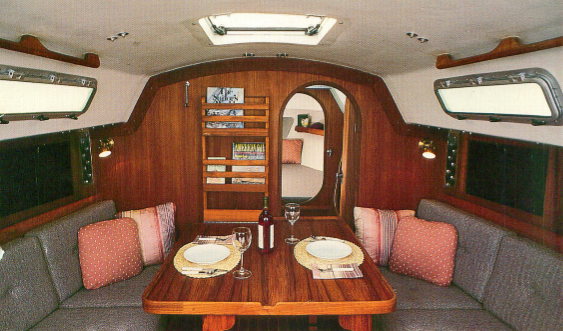
J/35 interior

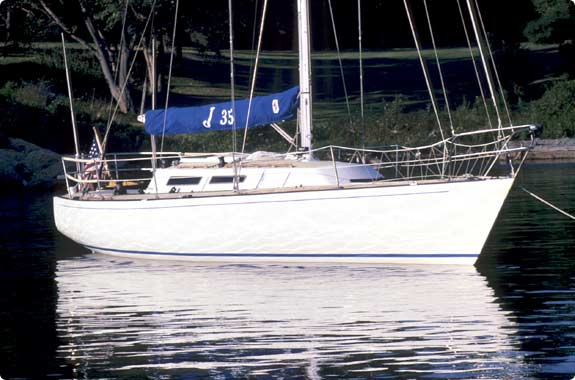
J/35

The J/35 is a recreational keelboat, built predominantly of fiberglass over a balsa core and with wooden trim. It has a masthead sloop rig with aluminum spars, a raked stem, a reverse transom with a swim ladder, an internally mounted spade-type rudder controlled by a tiller and a fixed fin keel. It displaces 10,500 lb (4,763 kg) and carries 4,400 lb (1,996 kg) of ballast. It can be fitted with a spinnaker for downwind sailing.

The boat has a draft of 6.90 ft (2.10 m) with the standard keel and 6.00 ft (1.83 m) with the optional shoal draft keel.

The boat is fitted with a Japanese Yanmar diesel engine of 30 hp (22 kW) for docking and maneuvering. The fuel tank holds 20 U.S. gallons (76 L; 17 imp gal) and the fresh water tank has a capacity of 35 U.S. gallons (130 L; 29 imp gal).

As a racer, the below decks accommodations are spartan in nature. The boat has six berths, including a bow "V"-berth, two main cabin settee berths and two quarter berths extending under the cockpit. The galley is located on both sides of the boat, at the foot of the companionway steps and includes a two-burner, alcohol (or optional propane) fired stove and an icebox. There is a sink with hand-pumped water. The head is located forward, just aft of the "V"-berth.

Ventilation is provided by eight opening ports and two deck hatches.

The cockpit is self-bailing and features teak footrests. For sailing there are two main, two-speed genoa winches, two secondary winches and one halyard winch. The mainsheet has a 4:1 mechanical advantage, which a fine tuning system with 16:1. There is a mainsheet traveler with a 4:1 car. An 8:1 boom vang is also provided, along with jib tracks. The standing rigging is mostly of steel rod construction.

The design has a PHRF racing average handicap around 70.

== Operational history ==
Keelboat sailing champion Andreas Josenhans wrote a review of the design in Sailing World Magazine, stating, "the J/35 has … become one of North America's most popular 35-footers … Not only is it one of the fastest boats in its size range, but a growing class organization has helped promote one design competition in the Great Lakes, Gulf Coast, and both the East and West coasts … The J/35 is a unique boat - it's half the price of a One Ton, but has the same speed in moderate conditions."

A review in Practical Sailor said, "in design, the 35 looks like a typical Rod Johnstone boat, with short overhangs for a long waterline, relatively low and flat sheerline, a low cabin house, and a moderate well-balanced rig. Obviously, Johnstone knows something about the harmony between a boat’s underbody and the water, but a large part of the boat’s speed is also dependent on the light weight—10,500 pounds on a 30-foot waterline—as well as a good distribution of that weight. Traditionalists may think the J/35 is a little plain, but its proportions are pleasing, and many people consider it the most attractive grand prix racer around. If you didn’t know the boat’s record, you probably wouldn’t pick it out of a crowd as a speedster, or know that it’s one of the most successful racing boats its size of the 1980s."

A review in Boats.com by engineer and marine surveyor Paul Grimes in 2010, noted some of the design's limitations, "A “displacement” boat - not a thrilling, planing boat downwind. Not the current look – no plumb bow, retractable sprit, etc. Has a racing cockpit, no raised coaming – when side decks get wet, butts get wet. Not a shoal draft boat – the fin keel draws 6'11". Has a tough rating - can be hard to sail to its 72-75 PHRF base rating – the boats have been raced well in the past."

== See also ==
- List of sailing boat types

Similar sailboats

- Express 35
- Mirage 35
