= J boat =

J boat may refer to:

- J/Boats, an American sailboat manufacturer
- J-class yacht, a single-masted racing sailboat built to the specifications of Nathanael Herreshoff's Universal Rule.
