= J/92 =

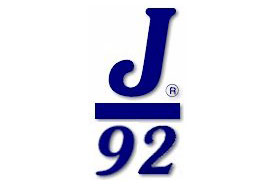

Development
- Designer: Rod Johnstone
- Year: 1992–2003
- No. built: 150
- Design: One-Design
- Builder: J/Boats
- Name: J/92

Hull
- Type: Monohull
- Construction: GRP
- Engine: Yanmar 1GM10

Hull appendages
- Keel: Fixed

Rig
- Rig type: Fractional rig
- I foretriangle height: 11.28 m (37.0 ft)
- J foretriangle base: 3.51 m (11.5 ft)
- P mainsail luff: 11.58 m (38.0 ft)
- E mainsail foot: 4.11 m (13.5 ft)

Sails
- Mainsail area: 23.83 m^{2} (256.5 sq ft)
- Jib/genoa area: 19.77 m^{2} (212.8 sq ft)
- Upwind sail area: 43.59 m^{2} (469.2 sq ft)

Racing
- PHRF: 105 (triangular) / 108 (WWD/LWD)

The J/92 is a fixed keel one-design sportsboat.

== Design ==
The J/92 was designed by Rod Johnstone. It was introduced in 1992 by J/Boats who built 150 boats until 2003.

The displacement–length ratio is 132 making it a light displacement boat. Beam is moderate at 10 feet (3.0 m) and the draft is 5.9 feet (1.8 m). The asymmetrical spinnaker is flown from an extendable carbon bowsprit.

Sailing World selected the J/92 as overall "Boat of the Year" in 1993.

== Construction ==
The J/92 was built by Tillotson-Pearson Inc (TPI) in Warren, Rhode Island using a fiberglass sandwich construction of end-grain balsa core. Frames and bulkheads are glassed both to the hull and deck. The keel is seated in epoxy and thru-bolted to the keel stub.

== See also ==
- J/92s
