= J/30 =

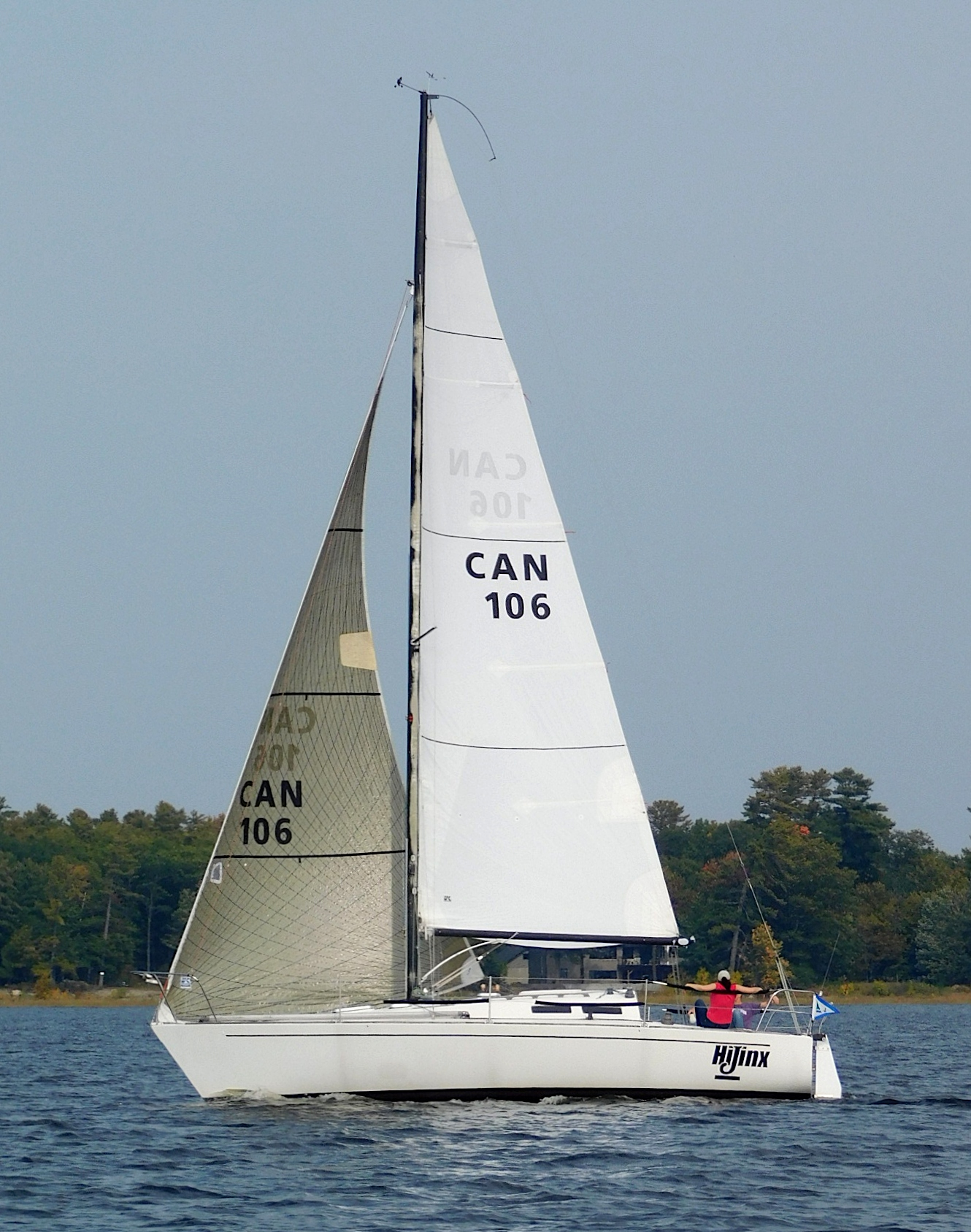

Development
- Designer: Rod Johnstone
- Year: 1979–1986
- Design: One-Design

Boat
- Crew: 3 – 7
- Draft: 1.6 m (5 ft 3 in)

Hull
- Type: Monohull
- Construction: GRP
- Hull weight: 3,175 kg (7,000 lb)
- LOA: 9.09 m (29.8 ft)
- LWL: 7.62 m (25.0 ft)
- Beam: 3.41 m (11.2 ft)

Hull appendages
- Keel: Fixed

Rig
- Rig type: Fractional rig

Sails
- Mainsail area: 22.9 m^{2} (246 sq ft)
- Jib/genoa area: 18.2 m^{2} (196 sq ft)
- Spinnaker area: 65.4 m^{2} (704 sq ft)

The J/30 is a racer/cruiser sailing keelboat developed and built by J/Boats to provide more comfort for coastal cruising while maintaining a high level of sailing performance to make for a competitive racer.

Although the majority of boats are located on the United States East Coast, there are fleets across the country and J/30's can be found around the world. Built to be competitive around the buoys, there are active fleets from the Gulf Coast to the Northeast which hold regular One-Design racing, culminating in a North American Championship held in the fall of every year.

== History ==
Following on the enormous success of the J/24, Rod Johnstone designed the J/30 to motivate and sustain participation in the sport of sailing by the entire family. Introduced in 1979, the aim was to build a boat that would be comfortable for a family to cruise or daysail without compromising speed and performance. By striking this balance, the J/30 is a competitive racer that can be comfortably handled by sailors of all age and experience levels. The J/30 ceased production with hull number 545, built in 1986.

== Authority, rules and regulations ==
The national authority for the class is the J/30 National Class Association. The Class Association maintains a strict set of rules for One-Design racing with the goal of keeping costs down for the amateur sailors that comprise the class. The Class Association also serves as a resource for owners and crew interested in learning more about the class. Current one design rules can be found on the web.

The J30 has a PHRF rating ranging from 141 to 145 depending on the district the boat is located in.

== 1979 Fastnet Race ==
The J/30 was noted for its performance during the legendary, and tragic, 1979 Fastnet race. The 1979 Fastnet was besieged by a series of storms, resulting in 15 fatalities. Hull number 10, named Juggernaut, was shipped to England, where it was entered in the race. Hull number 29 was being single handed from Bermuda to England by Bill Wallace, getting caught in the storm as it entered the English Channel.
