= JY15 =

Sailboat class

- Class symbol

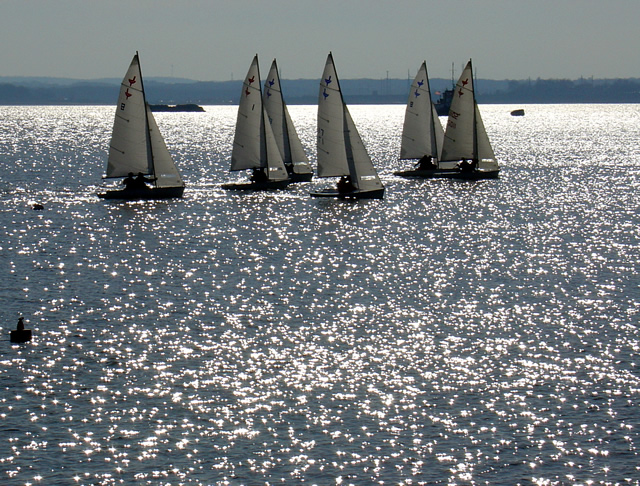
- JY15s racing at the Raritan Yacht Club, Perth Amboy, New Jersey

Development
- Designer: Rod Johnstone
- Location: United States
- Year: 1989
- No. built: 3000
- Builders: JY Sailboats; Hunter Marine; Nickels Boat Works; WindRider LLC

Boat
- Crew: 2
- Displacement: 275 lb (125 kg)
- Draft: 3.00 ft (0.91 m)

Hull
- Type: Monohull
- Construction: ACP (Advanced Composite Plastic) or Fiberglass
- LOA: 15.00 ft (4.57 m)
- Beam: 5.83 ft (1.78 m)

Hull appendages
- Keel: centerboard
- Ballast: none
- Rudder: transom-mounted rudder

Rig
- Rig type: Bermuda rig

Sails
- Sailplan: Fractional rigged sloop
- Mainsail area: 100 sq ft (9.3 m^{2})
- Jib/genoa area: 35 sq ft (3.3 m^{2})
- Total sail area: 135 sq ft (12.5 m^{2})

The JY15 is an American one-design centerboard dinghy designed by Rod Johnstone in 1989.

== Production ==
The boat was built by JY Sailboats and then by Hunter Marine in the United States. The design was acquired by Nickels Boats Works and built from 2011. Nickels merged with WindRider LLC of Minneapolis, Minnesota in 2015 and production continued, but had ended by 2020.

== Design ==
The JY15 is a recreational, planing hull, sailing dinghy, built predominantly of Advanced Composite Process (ACP) by JY Sailboats and Hunter and later from fiberglass by Nickels and WindRider. It has a fractional sloop, a raked stem, a vertical transom, a transom-hung rudder controlled by a tiller with an extension and a folding centerboard. It displaces 275 lb (125 kg).

The boat has a draft of 3.00 ft (0.91 m) with the centerboard extended and 0.50 ft (0.15 m) with it retracted, allowing beaching or ground transportation on a trailer.

The stays have lever adjusters for rapid set-up and the mast disassembles for ease of ground transport. The mainsheet is a 2:1 and is led off to the centerboard trunk. The rudder swings up for launching and recovering in shallow water. The design is optimized for crew hiking out, with hiking straps and rounded deck and hull for comfort.

The Hunter-production JY-15 was made out of ACP (Advanced Composite Process). ACP is a laminate consisting of a foam core, an inner fiberglass skin, and a 1/8" outer plastic skin. When the design was acquired by Nickels it was rendered in fiberglass.

== Operational history ==
The JY15 was sailed in over 80 fleets in the US.

== See also ==
- List of sailing boat types

Similar sailboats

- Laser 2
