= J/80 =

Sailboat class

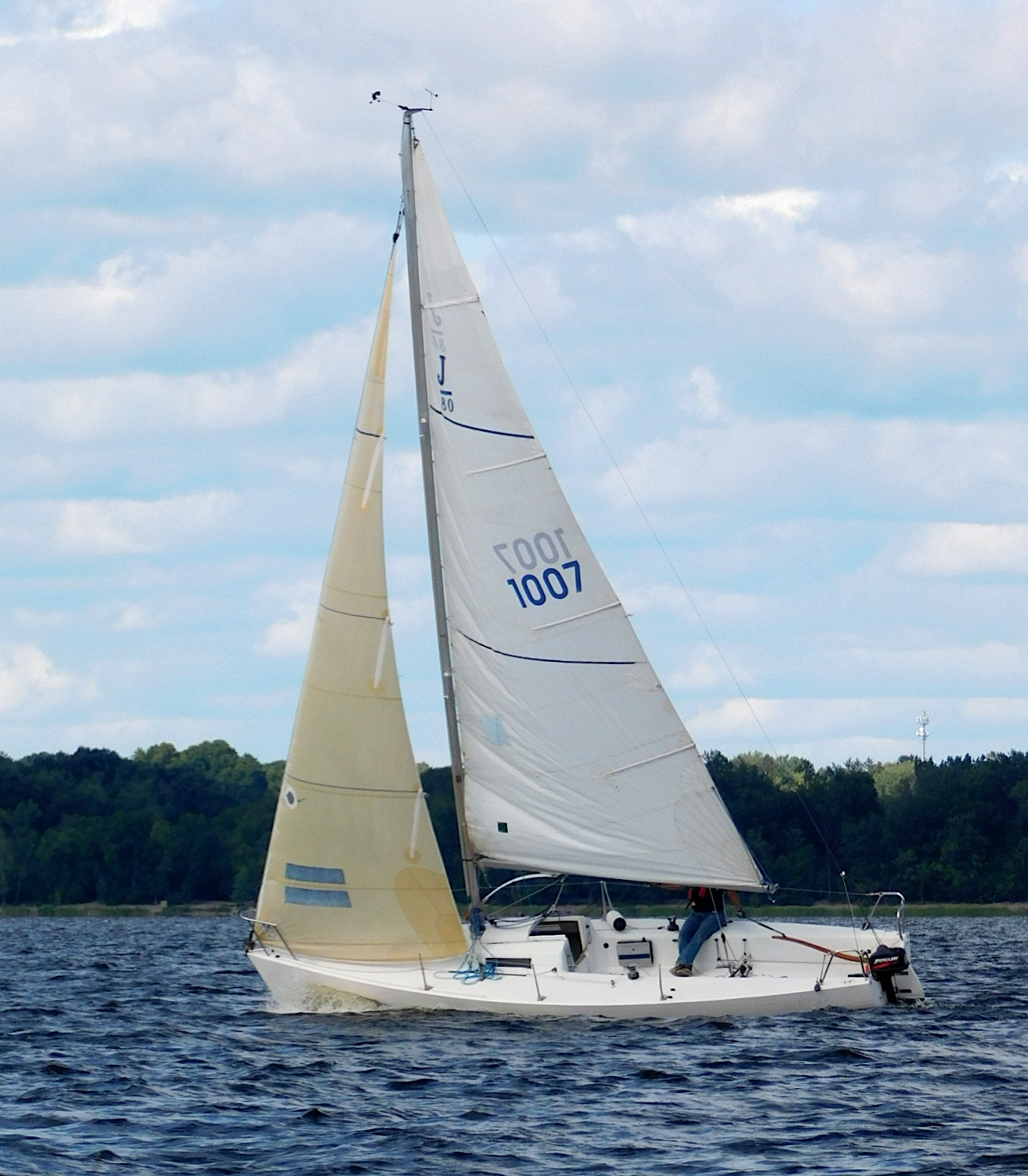

Development
- Designer: Rod Johnstone
- Location: United States
- Year: 1992
- No. built: 1,700
- Brand: J/Boats
- Builders: Tillotson Pearson; J Composites
- Role: Racer
- Name: J/80

Boat
- Crew: three
- Displacement: 2,900 lb (1,315 kg)
- Draft: 4.90 ft (1.49 m)

Hull
- Type: monohull
- Construction: fiberglass
- LOA: 26.25 ft (8.00 m)
- LWL: 22.00 ft (6.71 m)
- Beam: 8.25 ft (2.51 m)
- Engine: outboard motor

Hull appendages
- Keel: fin keel
- Ballast: 1,400 lb (635 kg)
- Rudder: transom-mounted rudder

Rig
- Rig type: Bermuda rig
- I foretriangle height: 31.50 ft (9.60 m)
- J foretriangle base: 9.50 ft (2.90 m)
- P mainsail luff: 30.00 ft (9.14 m)
- E mainsail foot: 12.50 ft (3.81 m)

Sails
- Sailplan: fractional rigged sloop
- Mainsail area: 187.50 sq ft (17.419 m^{2})
- Jib/genoa area: 149.63 sq ft (13.901 m^{2})
- Spinnaker area: 700 sq ft (65 m^{2})
- Total sail area: 337.13 sq ft (31.320 m^{2})

Racing
- Class association: One design

The J/80 is a one design racing keelboat. It has been built by Tillotson Pearson since 1992, for J/Boats in the United States, with over 1,700 built and still in production as of 2022. At one time it was produced by Waterline Systems, also in the US.

== Design ==
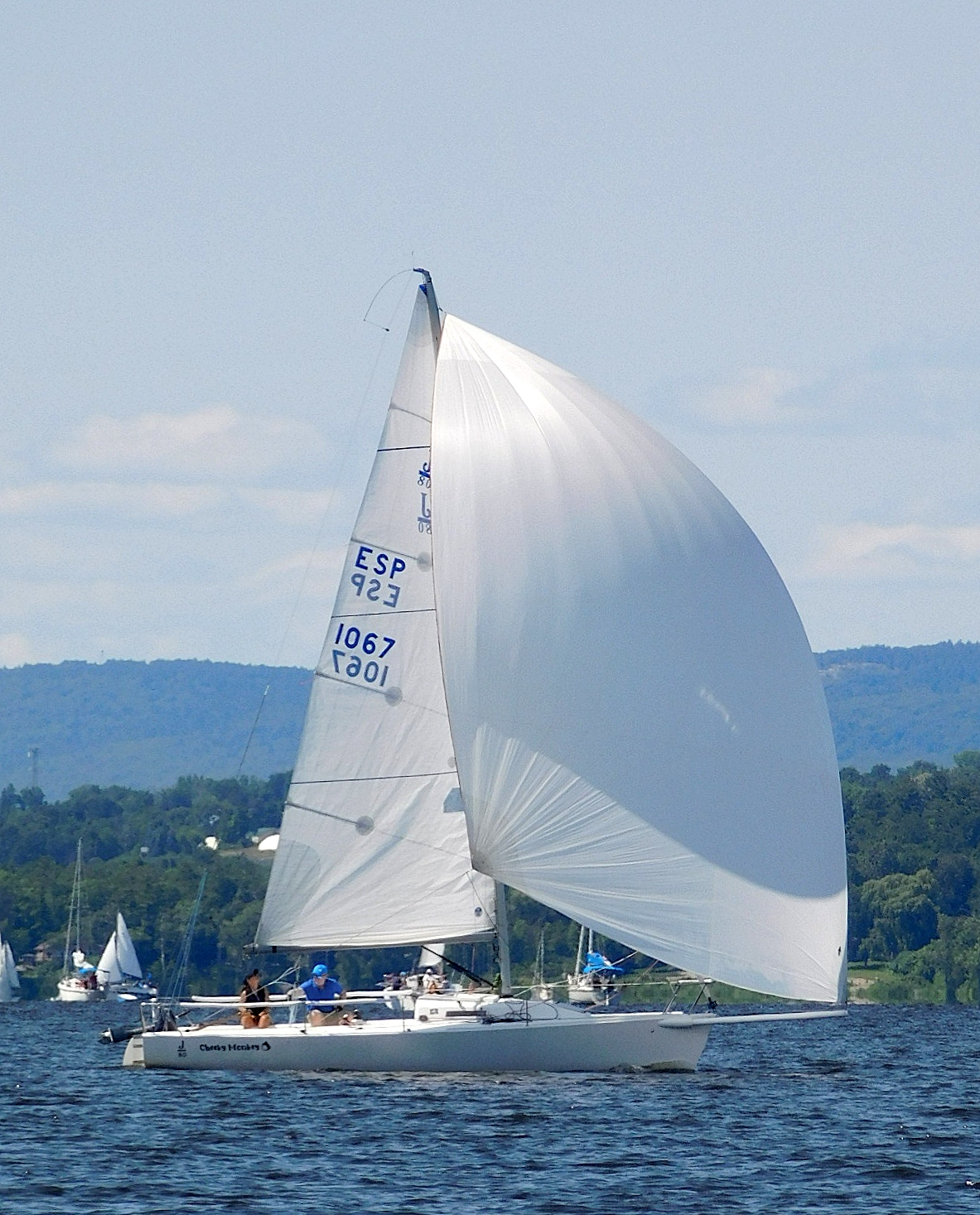
J/80 flying its asymmetrical spinnaker

Designed by Rod Johnstone, the hull is built predominantly of fiberglass, with a raked stem, a plumb transom, a transom-hung rudder controlled by a tiller and a fixed swept fin keel. It displaces 2,900 lb (1,315 kg) and carries 1,400 lb (635 kg) of ballast. The cockpit is 12 ft (3.7 m) long and the hull has a sealed buoyancy compartment on the bow. The design has a hull speed of 6.29 kn (11.65 km/h).

It has a draft of 4.90 ft (1.49 m) with the standard keel. It can be transported on land on a towed double-axle boat trailer.

It has a fractional sloop rig with a retractable bowsprit controlled from the cockpit by a deployment line. For sailing downwind the design may be equipped with an asymmetrical spinnaker of 700 sq ft (65 m^{2}). It will plane under spinnaker.

In a 1994 expert review in Sailing World Magazine Doug Logan concluded, "In the test's light airs, the J/80 could often sail at or close to windspeed, and in several instances recorded the best leg times. While hard to define as a "conservative" boat, this Rod Johnstone creation doesn't go to the max in sailplan and (lack of) stability, and employs the proven construction materials used in thousands of earlier J/Boats. This might cost a bit of speed in light air with chop, but should broaden the boat's user-friendliness in stronger winds."

== Events ==
The boat is supported by an active class club that organizes racing events, the International J/80 Class Association. The J/80 World Championship is a World Sailing–recognised world championship. There are 30 fleets racing in 12 countries, including in North America, Europe and China. It has also been used for two-boat match racing.
