= Vasco Serpa =

Portuguese sailor

Personal information
- Nationality: Portuguese
- Born: 21 August 1971 (age 53)

Sport
- Sport: Sailing

Vasco Serpa (born 21 August 1971) is a Portuguese sailor. He competed in the Laser event at the 1996 Summer Olympics.
