= J/70 =

Sailboat class

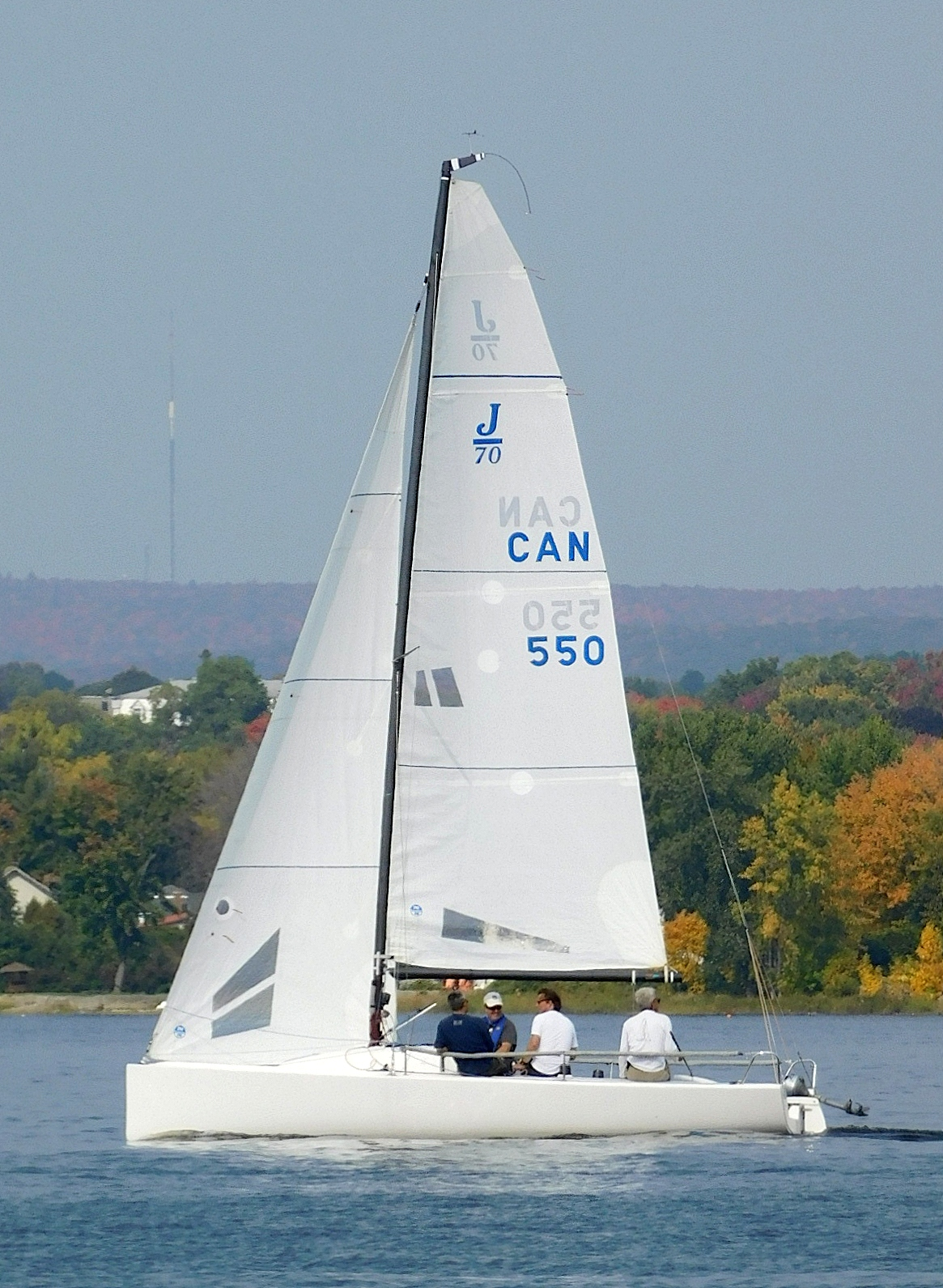

Development
- Designer: Alan Johnstone
- Location: United States
- Year: 2012
- No. built: more than 1324 (2018)
- Builder: J Boats
- Name: J/70

Boat
- Displacement: 1,790 lb (810 kg)
- Draft: 4.92 ft (1.50 m)

Hull
- Construction: Fiberglass
- LOA: 22.74 ft (6.93 m)
- LWL: 20.47 ft (6.24 m)
- Beam: 7.38 ft (2.25 m)

Hull appendages
- Keel: fin keel
- Ballast: 628 lb (285 kg)
- Rudder: transom-hung

Rig
- Rig type: Fractional rigged sloop
- I foretriangle height: 26.77 ft (8.16 m)
- J foretriangle base: 7.68 ft (2.34 m)
- P mainsail luff: 26.16 ft (7.97 m)
- E mainsail foot: 9.44 ft (2.88 m)

Sails
- Mainsail area: 123.48 sq ft (11.472 m^{2})
- Jib/genoa area: 102.80 sq ft (9.550 m^{2})
- Spinnaker area: 491 sq ft (45.6 m^{2})
- Total sail area: 226.27 sq ft (21.021 m^{2})

J/70 is a trailerable, 6.93-metre (22.7 ft) American sailboat class designed by Alan Johnstone and first built in 2012.

== Production ==
The boat is built for J Boats by three builders, CCF Composites in the United States, J/Composites in Europe and J/Boats Argentina in South America. At least 1451 had been constructed by 2019.

== Design ==
The J/70 is a small racing keelboat, built predominantly of fiberglass. It has a fractional sloop rig, a transom-hung rudder, a retractable bowsprit and a lifting keel. It displaces 1,790 lb (812 kg) and carries 628 lb (285 kg) of lead ballast. The boat features a very large asymmetrical spinnaker with an area of 491 sq ft (45.6 m^{2}), flown from the carbon fiber bowsprit.

== Events ==
=== European Championship ===
Year	Gold	Silver	Bronze
2016 Kiel	Italy; Claudia Rossi; Matteo Mason; Simone Spangaro; Michele Paoletti	Monaco; Stefano Roberti; Enrico Fonda; Ludovic Broquaire; Filippo Lamantia	Spain; Gonzalo Araújo; Guilherme Almeida; Diego Fructuoso; Nacho Giamonna
2018 Vigo	Italy; Alberto Rossi	Spain; Luis Bugallo	Italy; Umberto de Luca
2021 Charlottenlund	Spain; José María Torcida; Francisco Palacio; Rayco Tabares; Pablo Santurde; Luis Martín Cabiedes	Great Britain; Paul Ward	United States; Michael Goldfarb
2022 Hyères	Great Britain; Jonathan Calascione; James Peters; Morgan Peach; Dave Kohler	United States; Richard Witzel; Carlos Robles; Tomas Dietrich; Bernardo Freitas	Turkey; Ahmet Eker; Burak Zengin; Yaşar Arıbaş; Cem Gözen
2023 Weymouth	United States; Douglas Rastello; Steve Hunt; John Wallace; Morgan Trubovich	Portugal; Vasco Serpa; Paulo Manso; Diogo Pinto; Hugo Rocha	Turkey; Gülboy Güryel; Ali Tezdiker; Massimo Bortoletto; Victor Diaz de Leon
2025 Sandhamn	Portugal; Vasco Serpa; Bernardo Plantier; Afonso Domingos; Hugo Rocha	Spain; Luis Albert; Gerardo Prego; Alejandro Muscat; Manu Weiller	Spain; Luís Martín Cabiedes; Luis Bugallo; Alberto Padrón; Jon Larrazábal
2026 Barcelona	Spain; Món Cañellas; Alberto Guillén; Ricard Castellví; Pol Font	Spain; Javier Padrón; Gustavo del Castillo; Adolfo López; Ricardo Terrades	Portugal; Nuno Espírito Santo; Hugo Rocha; Fran Palacios; Frederico Melo

== See also ==
- List of sailing boat types
