= J/105 =

1990s racing sailboat

- Class symbol

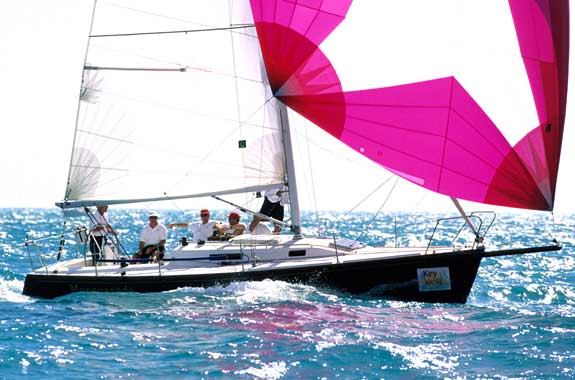
- J/105 sailing downwind under spinnaker.

Development
- Designer: Rod Johnstone
- Year: 1991–
- Design: One-Design

Boat
- Crew: Cruising: 2–3 Racing: 5-8
- Draft: 1.98 m (6 ft 6 in)

Hull
- Type: Monohull
- Construction: GRP
- Hull weight: 3,515 kg (7,749 lb)
- LOA: 10.52 m (34.5 ft)
- LWL: 8.99 m (29.5 ft)
- Beam: 3.35 m (11.0 ft)

Hull appendages
- Keel: Fixed

Rig
- Rig type: Fractional rig

Sails
- Total sail area: 53.6 m^{2} (577 sq ft)

The International J/105 is a fixed keel one design racing sailboat. It was the first production boat featuring a retractable bowsprit, which allows for an unusually large asymmetrical spinnaker. It was introduced in 1991 by J/Boats and designed by Rod Johnstone. J/105s are a common sight in one design racing and to date, J/Boats has built 685 J/105s. The J/105 is regarded as a fast design with a clean deck layout. It was selected as the 1992 "Boat of the Year" in the Racer/Cruiser category by Sailing World magazine.

The concept behind the J/105 line is to produce boats that are fast, strong, fun and easy to sail shorthanded while racing in One Design fleets or while cruising with dodger raised, sails furled and swim ladder swung off the transom. The J105 was the first keelboat to feature a retractable sprit and true pole-free spinnaker sailing.

J/105 has the stability, rig and sail controls to handle 15-20 knot winds without the need of reefing. It has the strength and seaworthiness for oceangoing passages.

The J/105 is the most successful one-design keelboat class over 30' in the US with 685 boats sailing worldwide. The class association is an owner managed organization with strict one-design rules. In addition to its active use in one design sailing, the J/105s affordability makes it an attractive choice for PHRF and Single/Double handed offshore sailing. J/105s are also well suited for community sailing programs training high school age sailors in keel boat and offshore racing.

In 2008, J/Boats announced that new J/105 production commenced at the US Watercraft facility in Portsmouth, Rhode Island. Hull #672 was the first of this production, with at least two more confirmed produced (#673, #674) in fall 2008, made from construction molds copied from French molds. Base price was US$159,000 as of fall 2008 not including options. The last five hulls, #681-685 were produced in United States and all shipped to customers in Chile where a fleet of over 25 exists. US Watercraft was also the official builder for the International J/22 (since 2001) and International J/24 (since 1999), however US Watercraft is currently in receivership and its future is uncertain.

The J105 class is governed by the J/105 Class Associated based out of Ruskin Florida.
