= J/111 =

Sailboat class

- J — 111

Development
- Designer: Alan Johnstone
- Location: United States
- Year: 2010
- Builder: J/Boats
- Role: One-design Racer-Cruiser
- Name: J/111

Boat
- Displacement: 9,370 lb (4,250 kg)
- Draft: 7.18 ft (2.19 m)

Hull
- Type: monohull
- Construction: fiberglass
- LOA: 36.42 ft (11.10 m)
- LWL: 32.71 ft (9.97 m)
- Beam: 10.80 ft (3.29 m)
- Engine: Volvo D1-20 18 hp (13 kW) diesel engine

Hull appendages
- Keel: fin keel with weighted bulb
- Ballast: 3,516 lb (1,595 kg)
- Rudder: internally-mounted spade-type rudder

Rig
- Rig type: Bermuda rig
- I foretriangle height: 47.74 ft (14.55 m)
- J foretriangle base: 13.85 ft (4.22 m)
- P mainsail luff: 45.24 ft (13.79 m)
- E mainsail foot: 14.50 ft (4.42 m)

Sails
- Sailplan: fractional rigged sloop
- Mainsail area: 327.99 sq ft (30.471 m^{2})
- Jib/genoa area: 330.60 sq ft (30.714 m^{2})
- Gennaker area: 1,399 sq ft (130.0 m^{2})
- Total sail area: 658.59 sq ft (61.185 m^{2})

The J/111 is an American sailboat that was designed by Alan Johnstone as a one-design racer-cruiser and first built in 2010. The boat is named for its length overall in decimeters.

The design is a World Sailing international class keelboat.

== Production ==
The design has been built by J/Boats in the United States, since 2010 and remains in production.

== Design ==
The J/111 is a recreational keelboat, built predominantly of fiberglass. Construction is glass reinforced polyester and a balsa fiberglass vinylester sandwich via vacuum bag molding. It has a fractional sloop rig with a keel-stepped carbon fiber mast with two sets of swept spreaders, an aluminum boom and steel rod rigging. It has a retractable bowsprit, a plumb stem, an open and sightly reverse transom, an internally mounted spade-type rudder controlled by a wheel and a fixed cast iron, fin keel with a weighted lead bulb. It displaces 9,370 lb (4,250 kg) and carries 3,516 lb (1,595 kg) of ballast.

The boat has a draft of 7.18 ft (2.19 m) with the standard keel.

The boat is fitted with a Swedish Volvo D1-20 diesel engine of 18 hp (13 kW) for docking and maneuvering. The fuel tank holds 13 U.S. gallons (49 L; 11 imp gal) and the fresh water tank has a capacity of 26.4 U.S. gallons (100 L; 22.0 imp gal). The holding tank is 11.9 U.S. gallons (45 L; 9.9 imp gal)

The design has sleeping accommodation for six to eight people, with a double "V"-berth in the bow cabin, two straight settee berths in the main cabin around a folding table, two aft quarter berths, plus two optional fold-up sea-berths. The galley is located on the port side at the companionway ladder. The galley is L-shaped and is equipped with a two-burner stove and a sink. A navigation station is opposite the galley, on the starboard side. The enclosed head is located just aft of the bow cabin on the port side. Cabin head room is 70 in (180 cm).

For sailing downwind the design may be equipped with an asymmetrical spinnaker of 1,399 sq ft (130.0 m^{2}), flown from the retractable bowsprit.

The design has a hull speed of 7.66 kn (14.19 km/h).

== Operational history ==
The boat is supported by an active class club that organizes racing events, the J/111 Class Association.

== See also ==
- List of sailing boat types
