= J/22 =

Sailboat class

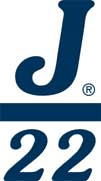
- Class symbol

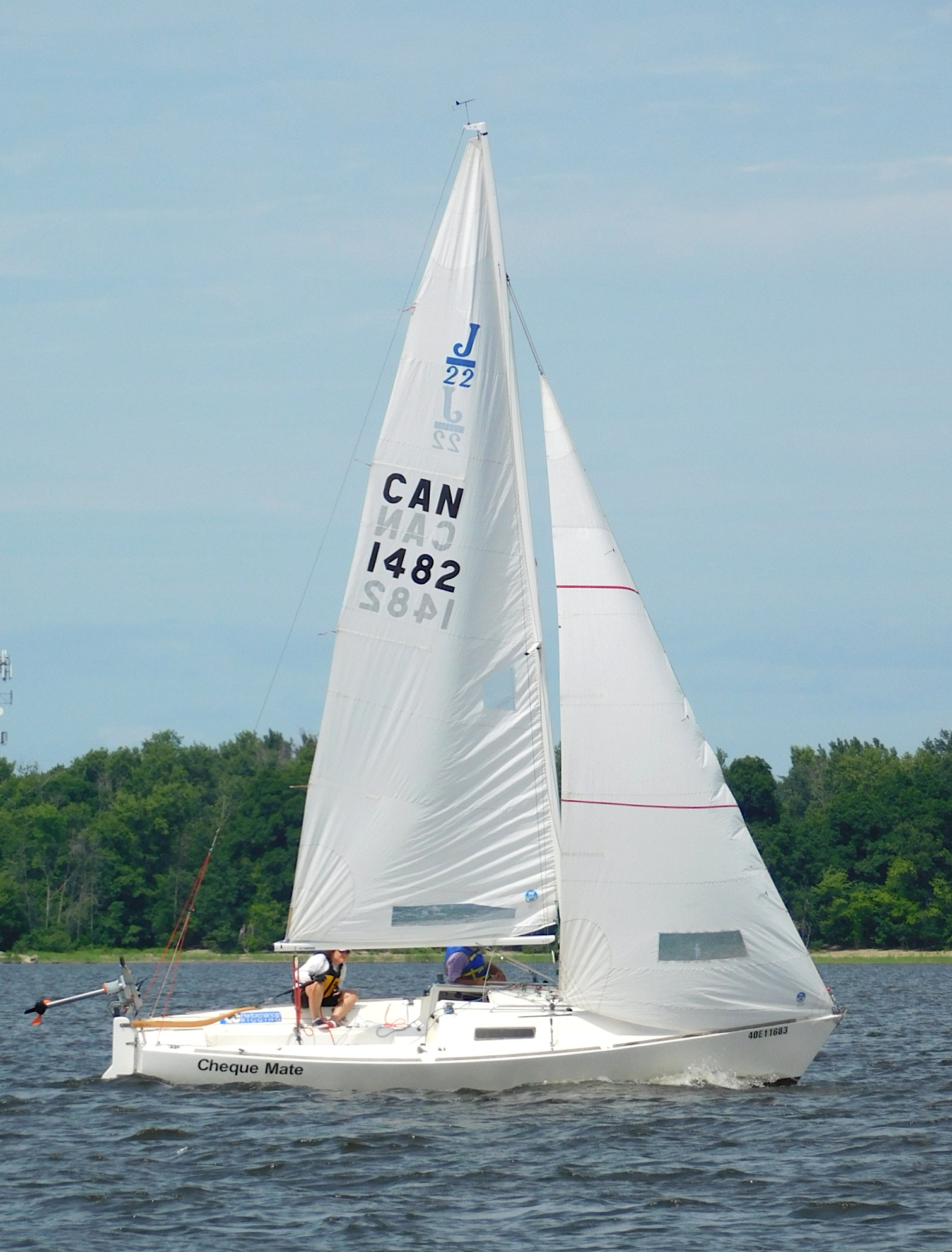

Development
- Designer: Rod Johnstone
- Location: United States
- Year: 1983
- Builders: Tillotson Pearson for J Boats; Waterline Systems
- Role: One-design racer
- Name: J/22

Boat
- Displacement: 1,790 lb (812 kg)
- Draft: 3.80 ft (1.16 m)

Hull
- Type: Monohull
- Construction: Fiberglass
- LOA: 22.50 ft (6.86 m)
- LWL: 19.00 ft (5.79 m)
- Beam: 8.00 ft (2.44 m)
- Engine: Outboard motor

Hull appendages
- Keel: fin keel
- Ballast: 700 lb (318 kg)
- Rudder: transom-mounted rudder

Rig
- Rig type: Bermuda rig
- I foretriangle height: 24.80 ft (7.56 m)
- J foretriangle base: 8.80 ft (2.68 m)
- P mainsail luff: 26.10 ft (7.96 m)
- E mainsail foot: 9.00 ft (2.74 m)

Sails
- Sailplan: Fractional rigged sloop
- Mainsail area: 117.45 sq ft (10.911 m^{2})
- Jib/genoa area: 109.12 sq ft (10.138 m^{2})
- Spinnaker area: 361 sq ft (33.5 m^{2})
- Total sail area: 226.57 sq ft (21.049 m^{2})

Racing
- D-PN: 82.4
- PHRF: 180-183

The J/22 is an American trailerable sailboat that was designed by Rod Johnstone as a one-design racer and first built in 1983.

== Production ==
The design was initially built under contract by Tillotson Pearson for J/Boats of Newport, Rhode Island, United States, starting in 1983. It was later built by Waterline Systems in Portsmouth, Rhode Island, but that company had ceased production by 2017.

== Design ==
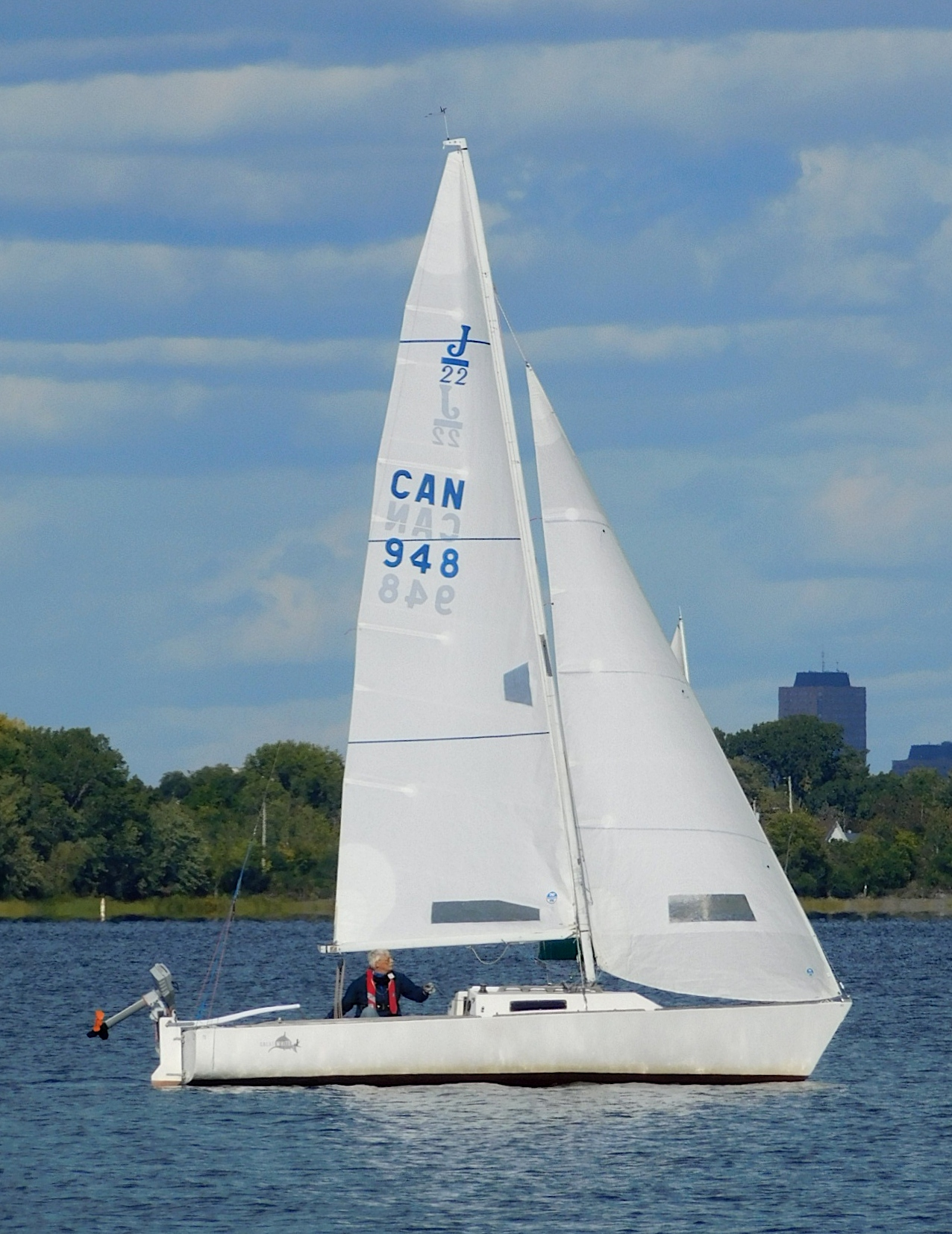
J/22

The J/22 is a recreational keelboat, built predominantly of fiberglass over a Baltex core, with teak wood trim. It has a fractional sloop rig with aluminum spars, a raked stem, a plumb transom, a transom-hung rudder controlled by a tiller and a fixed fin keel. It displaces 1,790 lb (812 kg) and carries 700 lb (318 kg) of lead ballast. The mainsail and jib are usually equipped with windows for visibility.

The boat has a draft of 3.80 ft (1.16 m) and is normally fitted with a small outboard motor for docking and maneuvering.

The cabin is small, low and equipped with a single rectangular fixed port on each side, while the cockpit is 7 ft (2.1 m) long and is self-bailing.

For sailing the design is equipped with an adjustable backstay and upper and lower shrouds. The mainsheet traveler is located mid-cockpit and sheets near the boom end. The jib winches are located on the coach house roof. The rudder assembly is the same as used on the larger J/24 and the boat comes with a lifting eye for crane launching.

Near the start of manufacturing in 1984 the optional equipment list included a steel sternrail and a bow pulpit, hull lifelines, bottom paint, V-berth cushions, a quarter-berth, boat trailer, and spinnaker. Unusual in a keelboat, the class rules allow hiking straps to be fitted.

The boat is normally fitted with a small 3 to 6 hp (2 to 4 kW) outboard motor for docking and maneuvering.

The design has a PHRF racing average handicap of 180-183 and a Portsmouth Yardstick of 82.4. It is normally raced with a crew of three sailors.

== Operational history ==
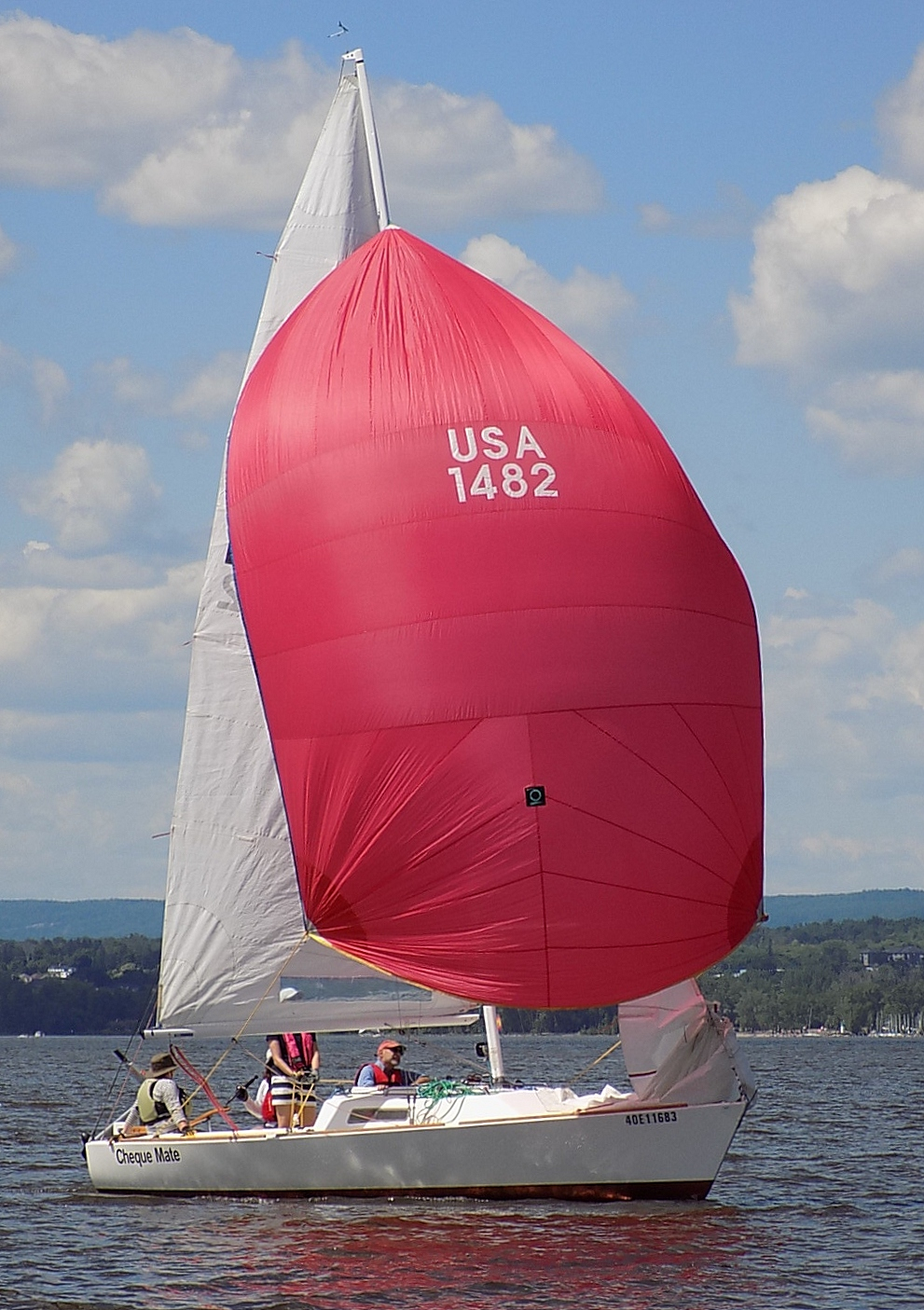
J/22 flying a spinnaker

By 1994 the boat was being raced in 61 fleets worldwide and had international status. The design has an active class association that organizes competitions, the International J/22 Class Association.

The J/22 is used in the USA Women's Match Racing Championship regatta, for the Santa Maria Cup

A 1984 review of the design in Canadian Yachting described it as "a fun, spritely yacht packed with performance". In assessing its performance the writer note, "with the wind a mild-mannered 12 to 18 knots and flat water, we had a whale of a ride. The J/22's helm is quick and responsive-distinctly dinghy-like. The boat is fitted with the same rudder assembly as the larger J/24, which results in most positive steering, but the helm is not heavy or difficult even in heavy weather. Because the helm is so light, the boat accelerates well and scorches along downwind. On the other hand, with full main and working jib, we did find the boat a little tender going to windward, with a habit of heeling quickly in the puffs. Under these circumstances, an alert crew shifting weight to the outer edge of the deck helped significantly."

In a 1994 review Richard Sherwood wrote, "ready to race when delivered, but the J/22 can still be tuned to fit conditions ... There is a cabin into which four or five people might fit, but the J/22 is meant to be raced, not cruised. (However, in light air, it is suggested that one or more of the crew go below to reduce windage and to keep weight forward and low.)"

In a 2010 review Steve Henkel wrote, "best features: Like the other J/boats, the J/22 is well built and well fitted out (Baltek-cored laminates, Harken deck fittings, Hall spars, etc.) Responsive, fast, and early-planing, built for safety with buoyancy tanks and offshore hatches, she is a very popular round-the-buoys racing class ... Worst features: Comfort is limited with no cockpit coamings; crew position is generally forward of the cockpit, hanging along the weather rail in anything but very light winds, A hoist (one ton or more) is almost a necessity to launch and retrieve the J/22 from the water. This boat is mainly a day-racer, but can be overnighted successfully. There are berths for four, but if privacy is an issue, we'd recommend one very friendly couple at most."

== See also ==
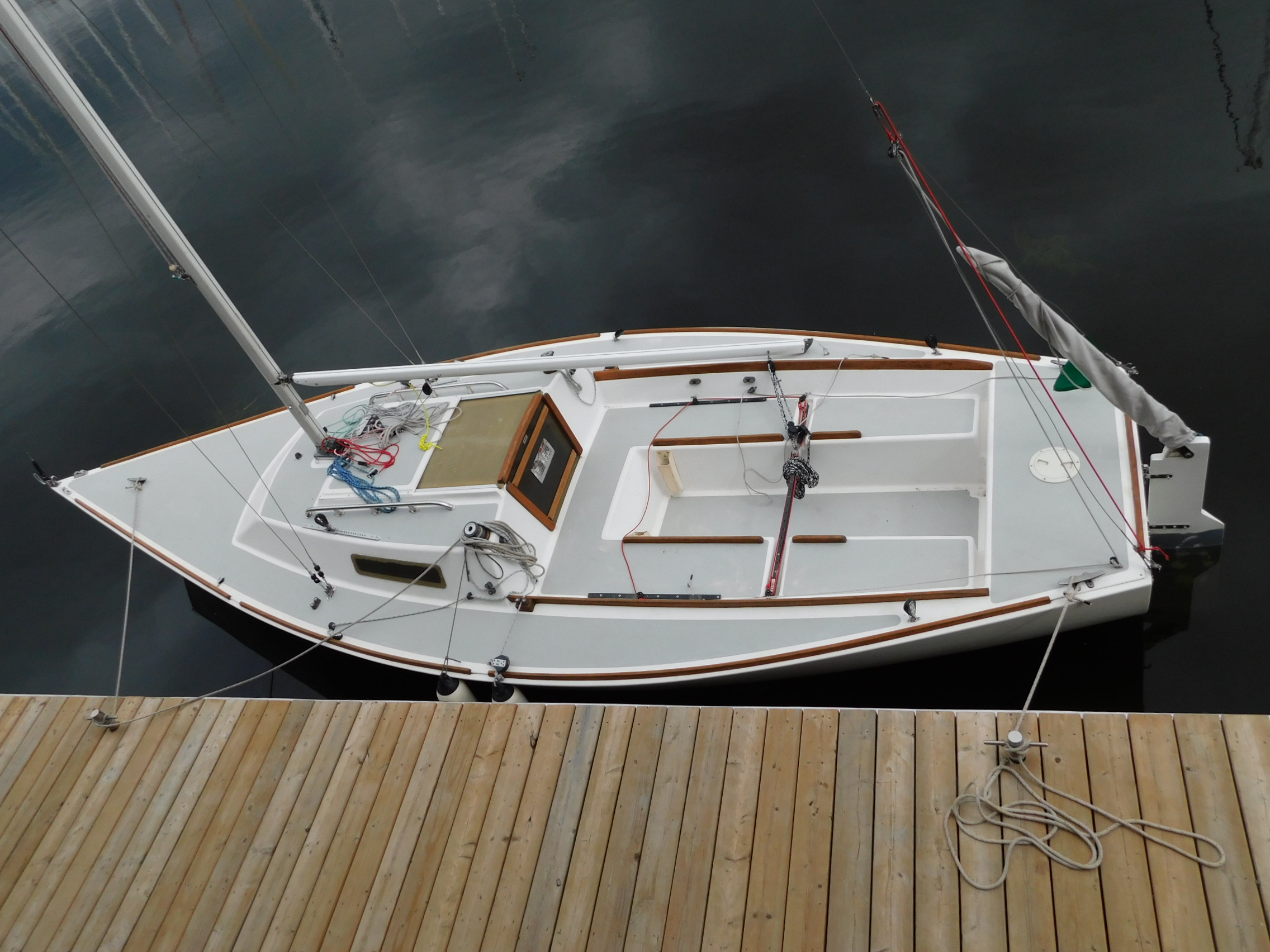
J/22 deck layout

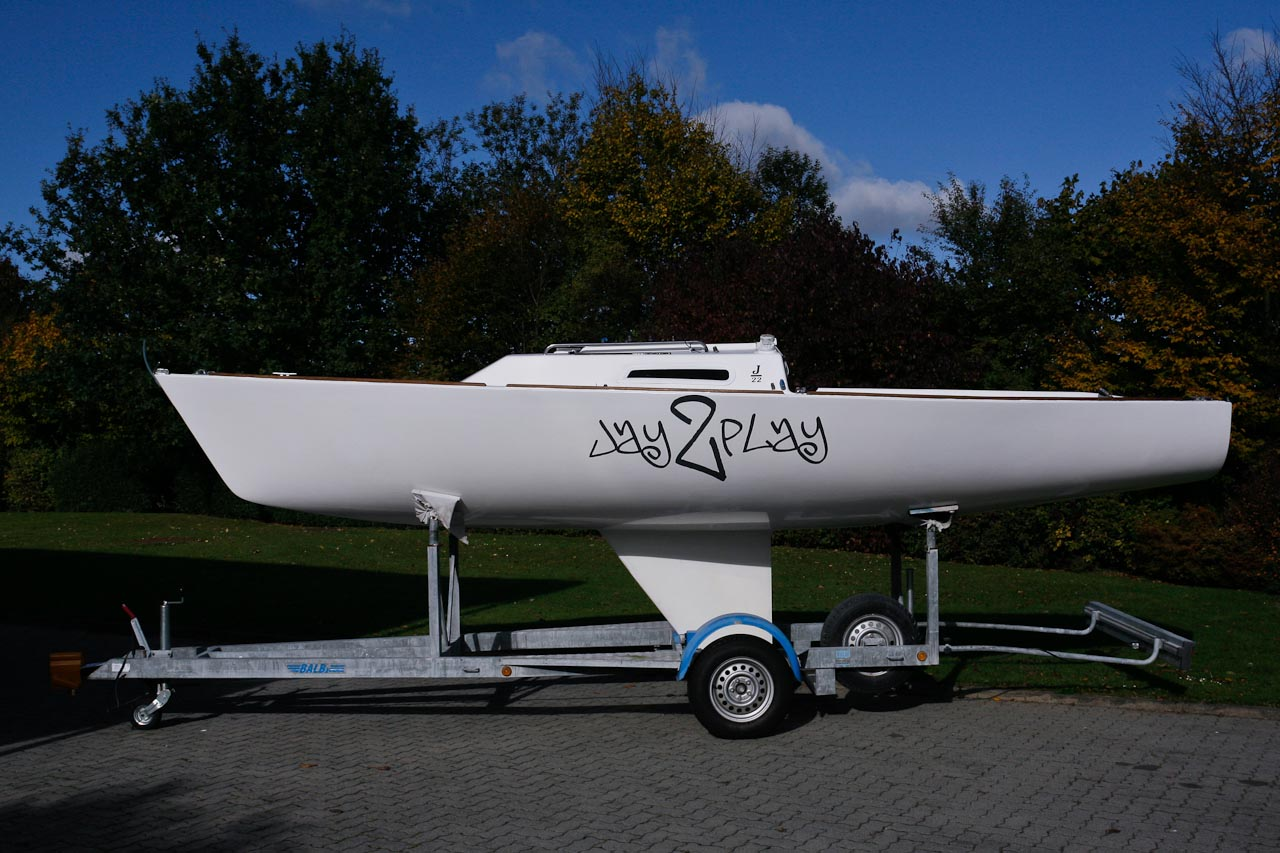
J/22 on trailer, showing keel arrangement

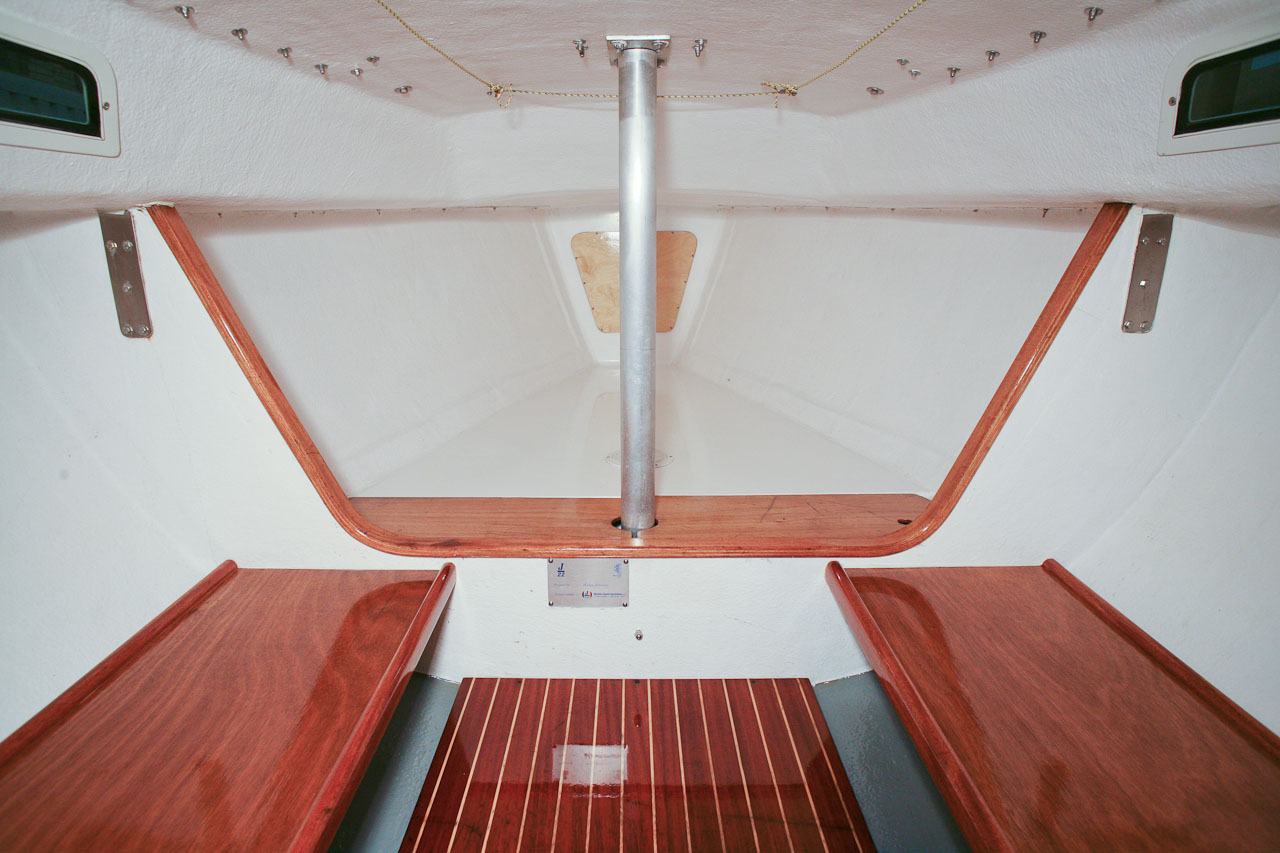
J/22 interior, showing the spartan accommodations

- List of sailing boat types

Related development

- J/24
- J/27
- J/32
