= J/Boats =

Sailboat manufacturer

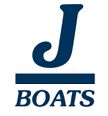
- Company type: Privately held company
- Industry: Boat building
- Founded: 1977
- Founders: Rod Johnstone (designer) & Bob Johnstone (marketing)
- Headquarters: Newport, Rhode Island, United States
- Key people: Jeff Johnstone (president) & Alan Johnstone (vp & chief designer)
- Products: Sailboats
- Website: www.jboats.com

J/Boats is an American boat builder based in Newport, Rhode Island and founded by Rod Johnstone in 1977. The company specializes in the design and manufacture of fiberglass sailboats.

The company's model names all start with "J/" and then the design's length overall (LOA), in feet (such as the J/24), or beginning in 1994 in decimeters (J/130), or starting 2021 in meters (J/9). All J/Boat designs are monohull, sloop-rigged keelboats constructed of cored sandwich fiberglass. The current product line consists of eight models, ranging from the J/70 to the J/45, ranging in length from 22.75 to 45.6 ft (6.9 to 13.9 m). A new 9 meter model has been announced for 2021. Past models have ranged from 22.5 to 64.5 ft (6.9 to 19.7 m), from the J/22 to the J/65.

The company's initial design, the J/24, is their most successful, with over 5,500 built. The J/24 is sailed 27 countries and is the world's most popular one design keelboat.

As Sailboatdata described, "the J/Boats company, a family affair started with brother Bob Johnstone, is arguably the most successful producer of performance-oriented boats in the world with nearly 10,000 boats built to Johnstone designs."

== History ==
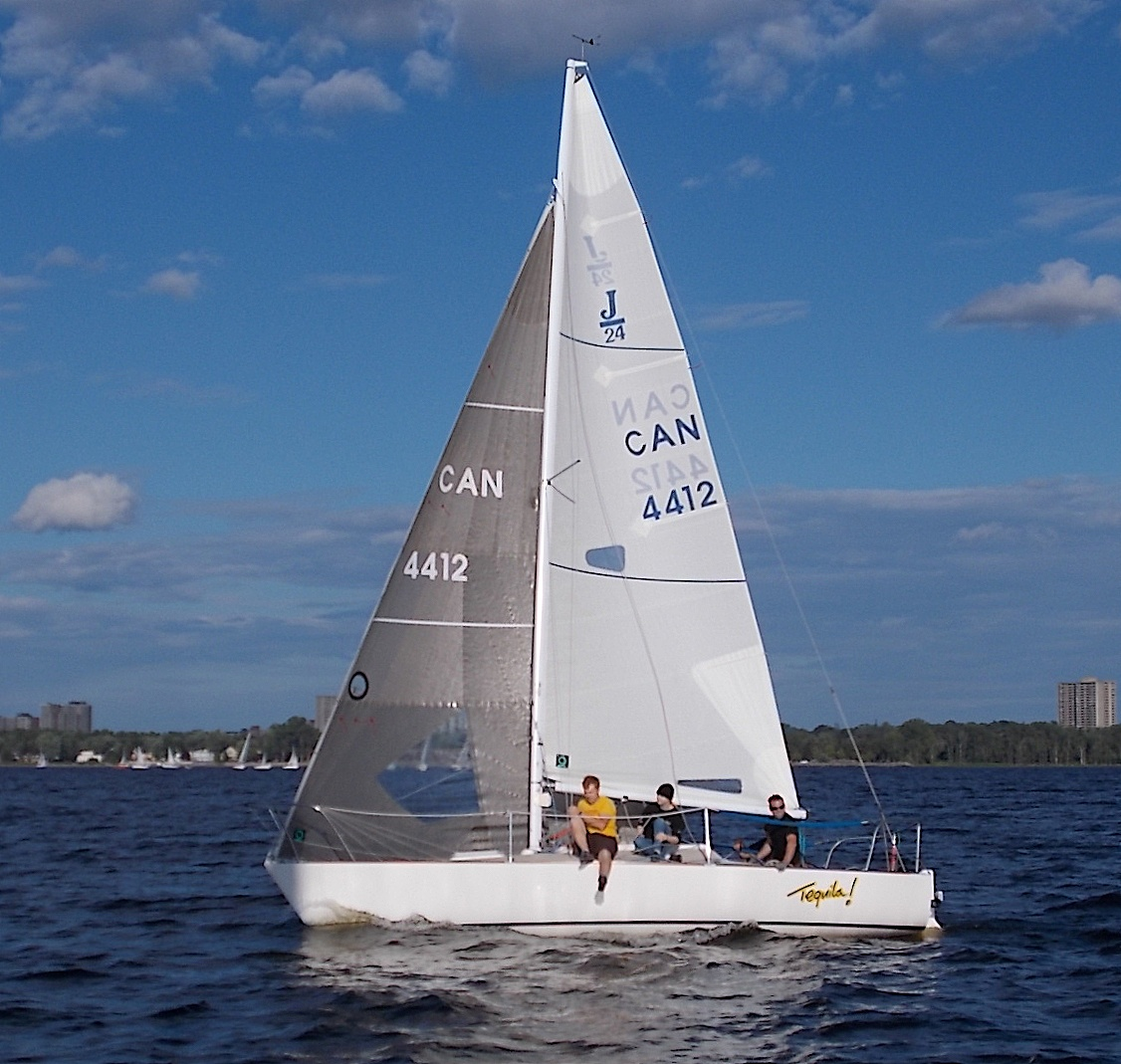
J/24

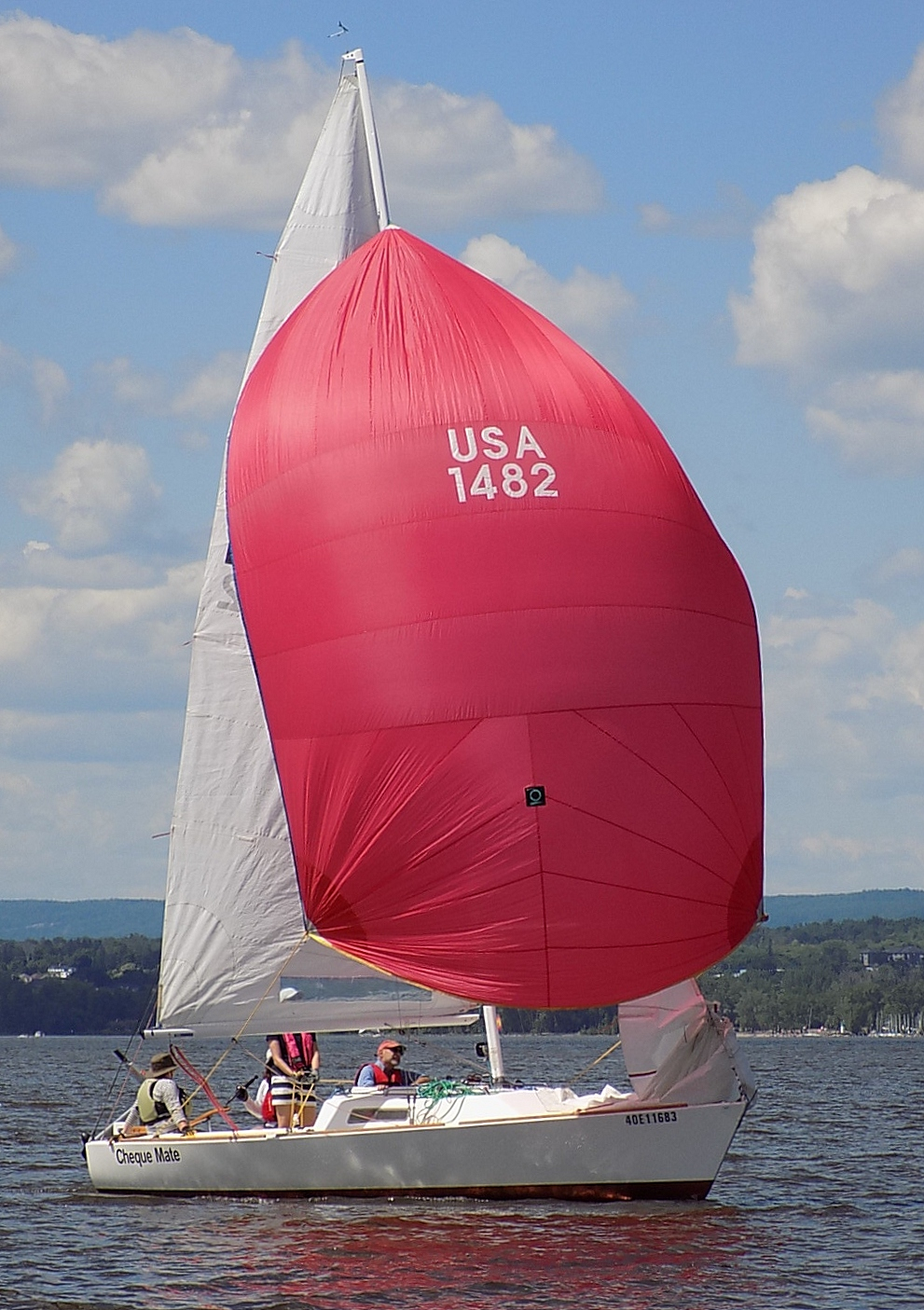
J/22

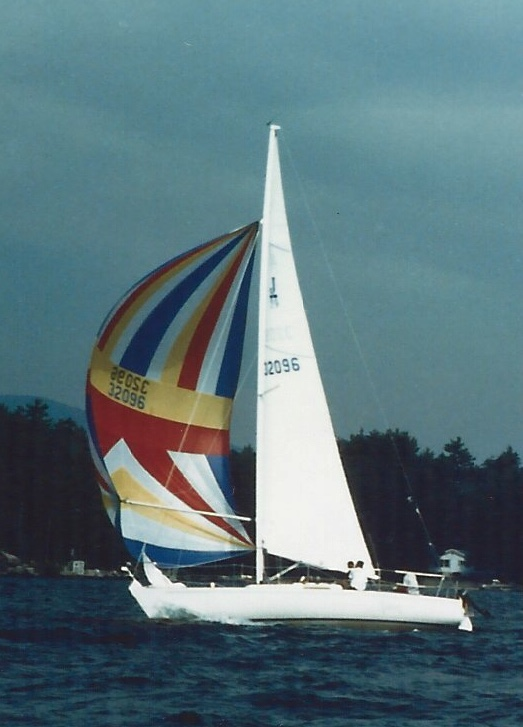
J/29 FR

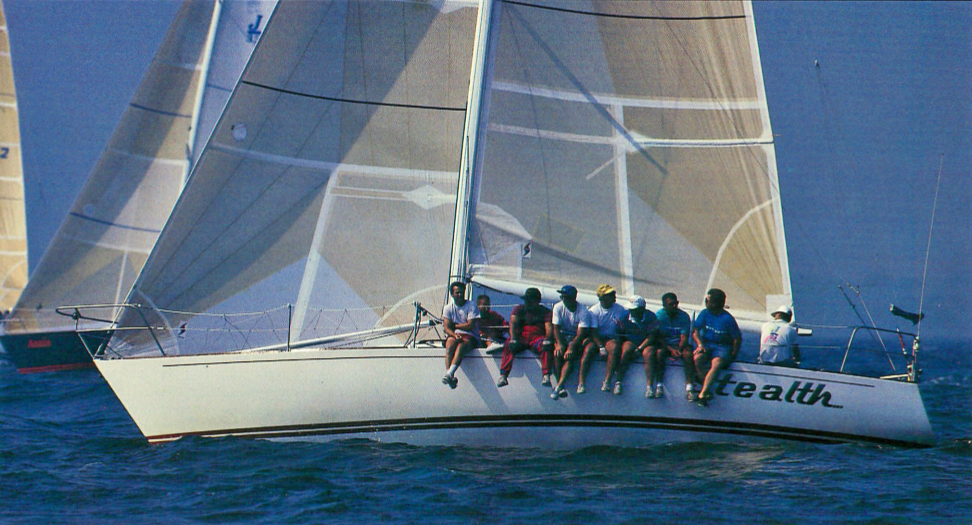
J/35

Rod Johnstone had completed a correspondence course at the Westlawn School of Yacht Design in the 1960s and in 1975 was working selling advertising for Soundings, a sailing trade magazine, when he started a homebuilt boat project. His first boat design, named Ragtime, was built on weekends, in his garage in Stonington, Connecticut. He raced the boat in the summer of 1976, with a crew made up of family members and amassed a very successful racing record. The co-founder of Pearson Yachts and owner of TPI Composites, Inc, Everett Pearson, made an agreement with Johnstone to produce the design in a new factory, in return for the exclusive United States building rights. The factory was established in an old textile mill in Fall River, Massachusetts. The design was designated as the J/24 and Johnstone arranged display advertising for the new boat in Soundings.

Rod Johnstone's brother, Bob Johnstone joined the new company to handle marketing and also invested $20,000 in start-up costs. He had been working as vice president of marketing for AMF/Alcort, the builders of the Sunfish sailboat at that time, but was unable to interest them in the J/24 design. The two Johnstone brothers became business partners in J/Boats.

The company intentionally avoided the production aspect of the business, leaving that to Pearson Yachts and instead concentrating on design and marketing.

Production of the J/24 started in 1977 and the new partners expected to sell 250 boats that first year, and actually sold 750. By early 1978 the class was popular enough to hold a one-design regatta in Key West with twenty boats competing and by that summer sixty-eight competed in Newport, Rhode Island.

Early successful designs included the 1983 J/22, the 1982 J/29 of which 298 were produced with a design first of either a Fractional Rig (FR) or Masthead (MH) rig, and the 1983 J/35 with 330 produced. The company classifies its designs into one design, offshore cruisers, offshore cruiser-racers, day sailers and weekend cruisers and pure racing designs

By 1992 a new generation of the Johnstone family was at the helm, while the elder Johnstones remained involved. Since then, Jeff Johnstone (President) & Alan Johnstone (Vice President & Chief Designer) have managed the company operations from J/Boats headquarters in Newport, RI. They were later joined by Bob's son, Stuart Johnstone, (Marketing) who oversees the newsletter and online presence. Currently, eight of the founders' children and grandchildren serve on the Board of Directors, including Jeff Johnstone, Alan Johnstone, Drake Johnstone, Phillip Johnstone, Stuart Johnstone, Pam Johnstone, India Johnstone & Nick Johnstone.

By 2020 the company had built almost 10,000 boats and had eight designs in production: the J/70, J/80, J/88, J/99, J/111, J/121, J/112E and the J/122E. In December 2020, a new model, the J/9, was announced for 2021.

== Boats ==
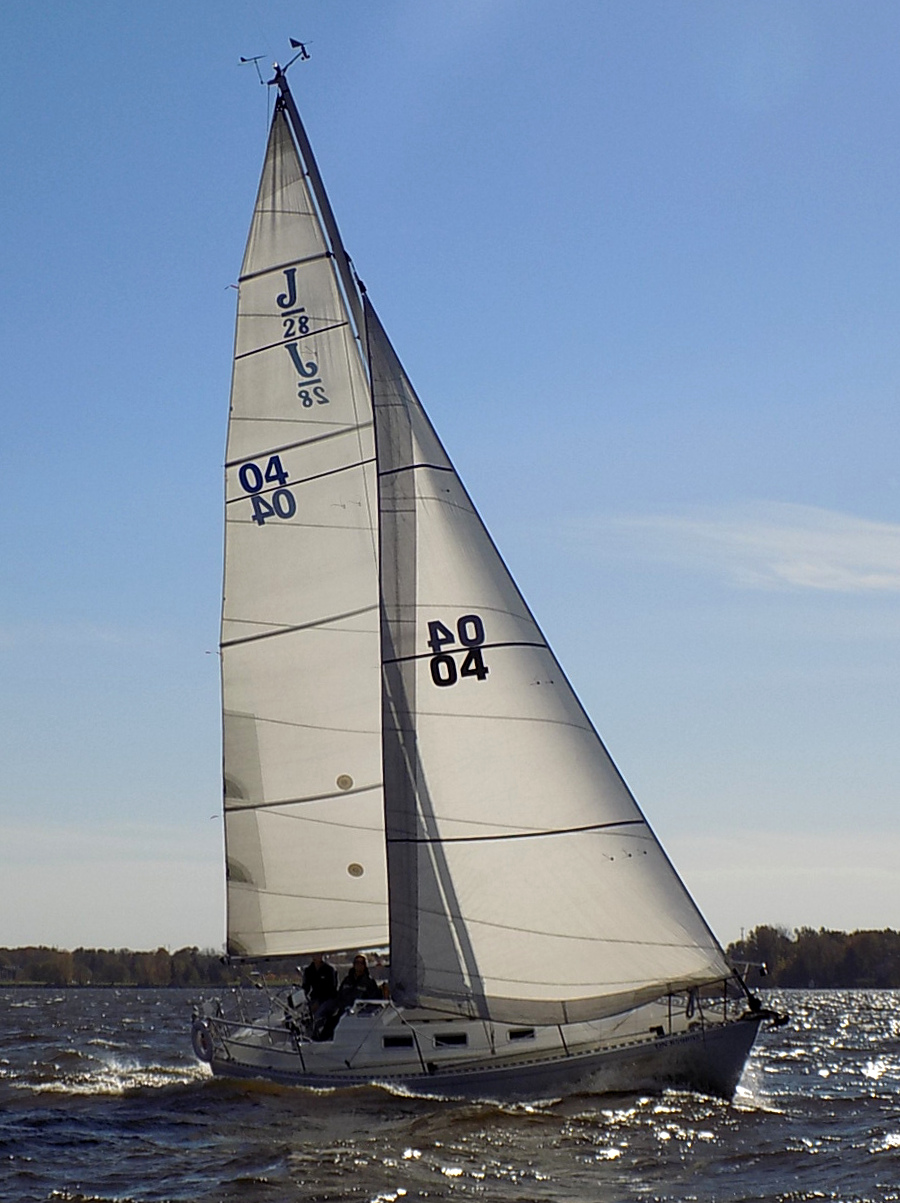
J/28

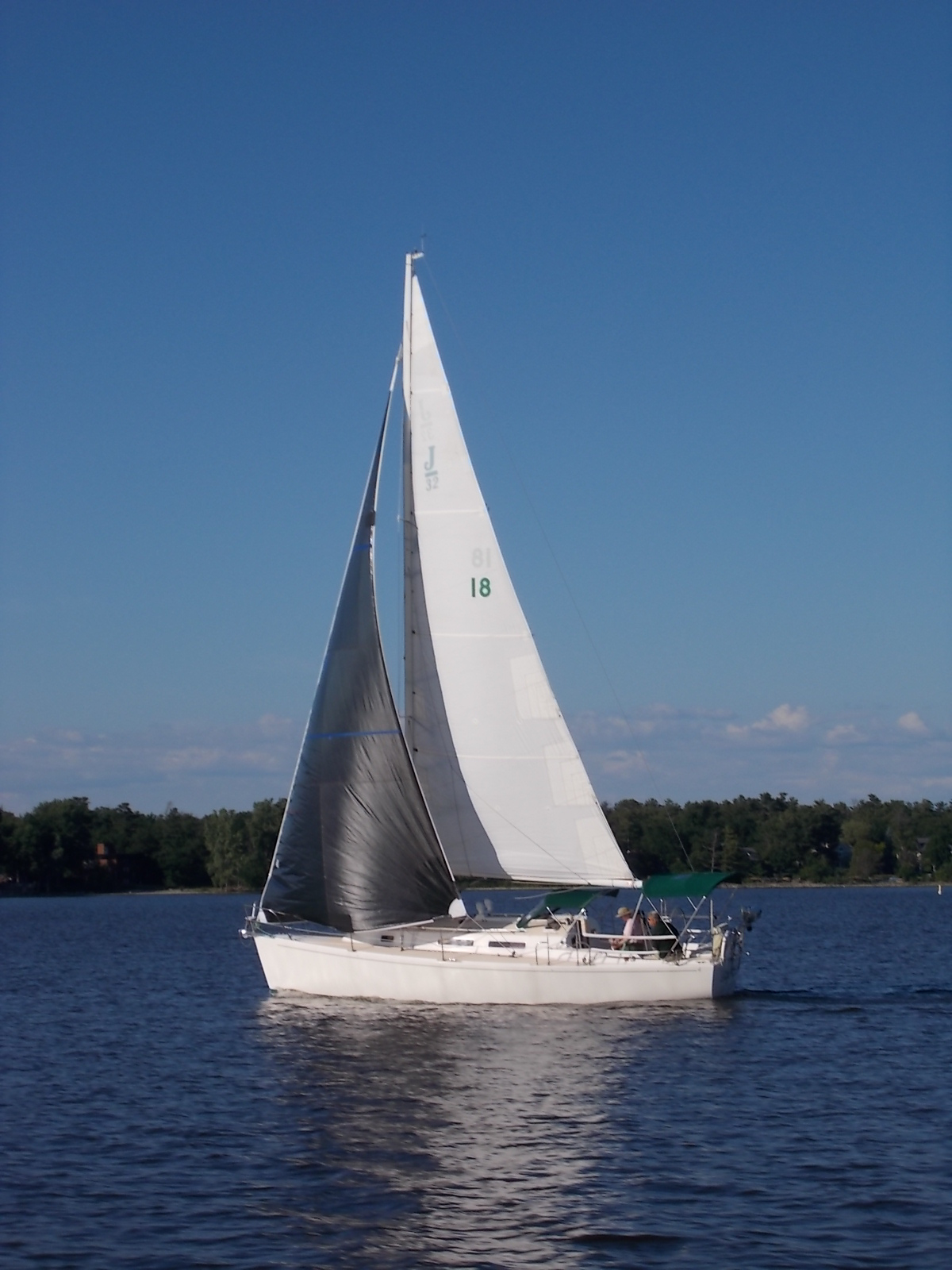
J/32

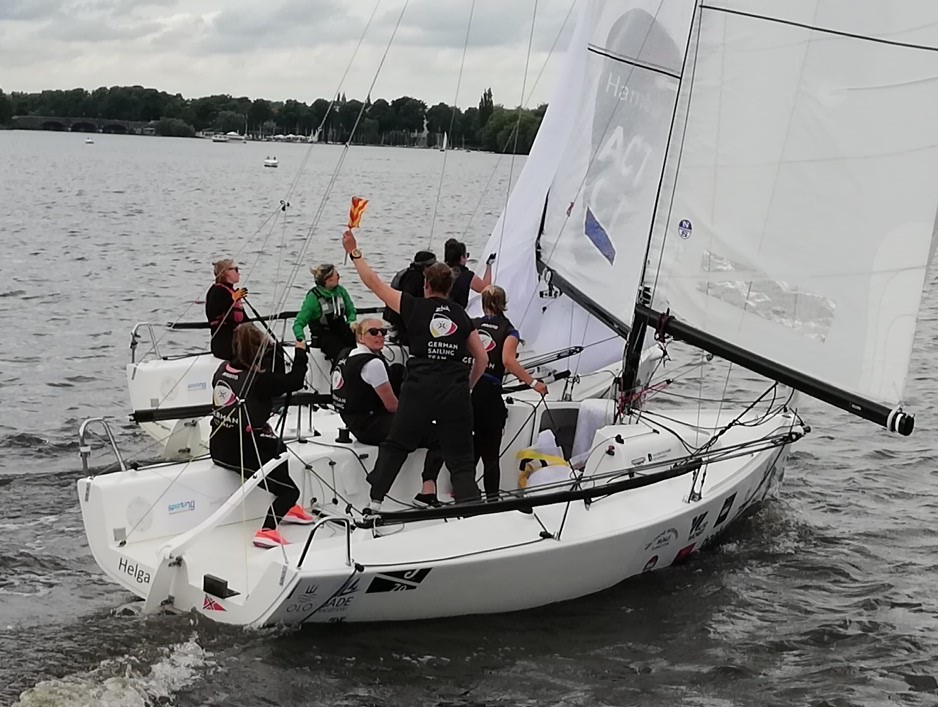
J/70

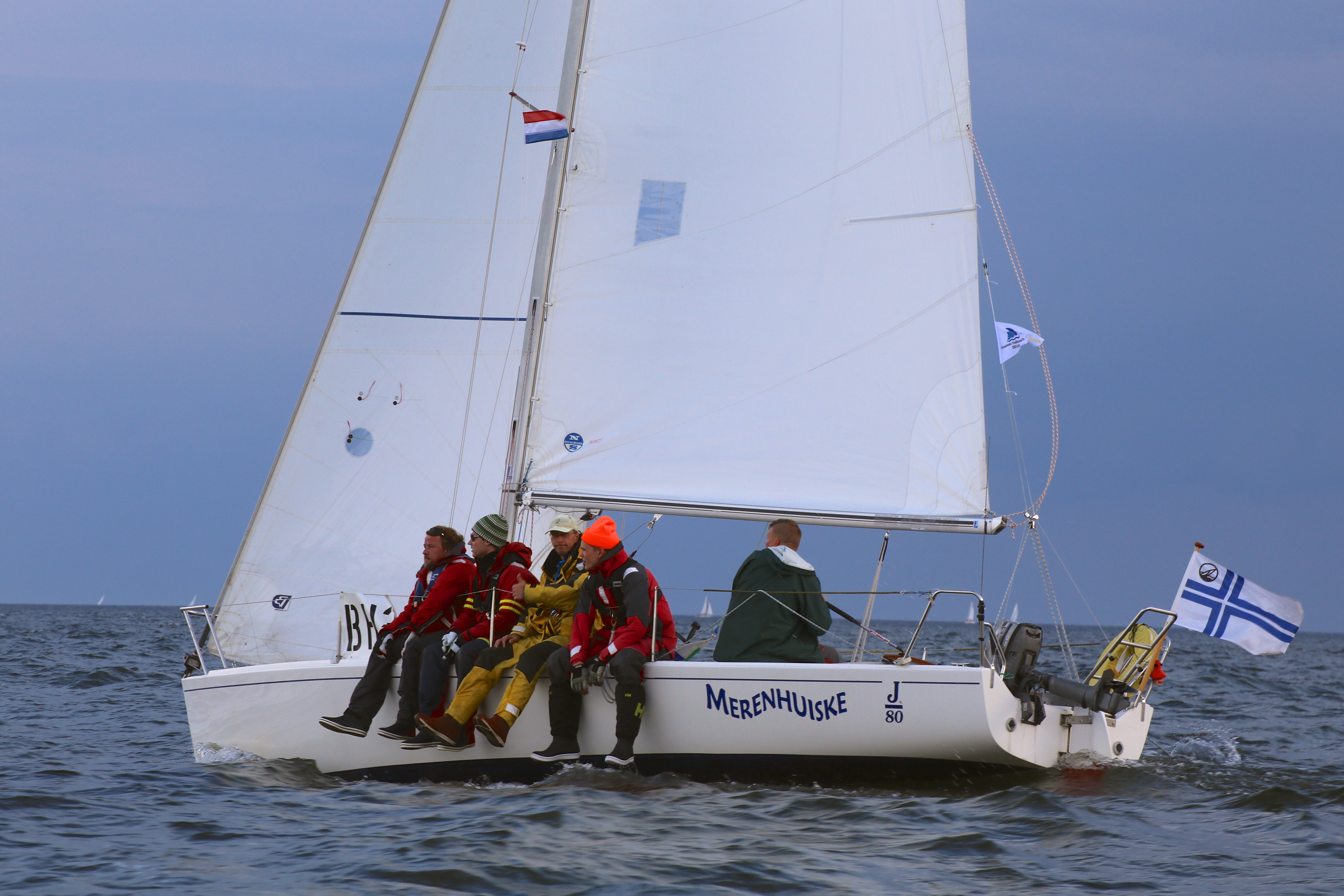
J/80

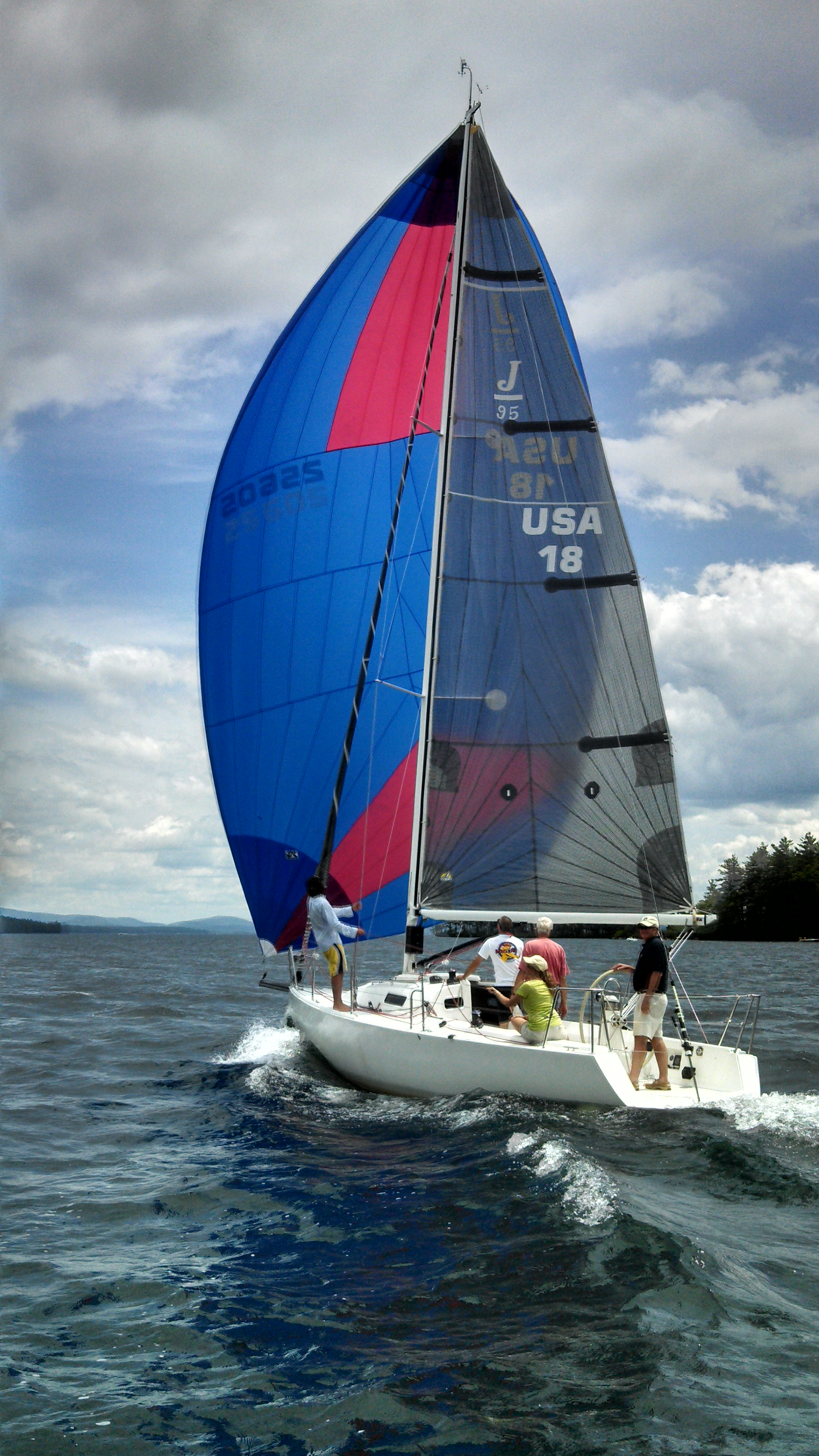
J/95

Summary of boats built by J/Boats, by year:

- J/24 1977 - number completed: 5,500+
- J/30 Introduced: 1979 - number completed: 546 - Last Model Year: 1987
- J/36 Introduced: 1981 - number completed: 55 - Last Model Year: 1984
- J/29 One Design includes MastHead or Fractional Rig, Inboard diesel or Outboard gas engine: introduced 1982 - number completed: 298 - Last Model Year 1987
- J/22 1983 - number completed: 1650+
- J/35 - Introduced: 1983 - number completed: 330 - Last Model Year: 1992
- J/27 - Introduced: 1984 - number completed: 189 - Last Model Year: 1992
- J/40 - Introduced: 1984 - number completed: 86 - Last Model Year: 1994
- J/41 - Introduced: 1985 - number completed: 19 - Last Model Year: 1987
- J/34 - Introduced: 1985 - number completed: 25 - Last Model Year: 1987
- J/28 - Introduced: 1986 - Built To: Hull #75 - Last Model Year: 1988
- J/34C Introduced 1986 Built to Hull #36 - Last Model Year: 1990
- J/37 - Introduced: 1987 - number completed: 52* - Last Model Year: 1991
- J/33 - Introduced: 1988 - number completed: 51 - Last Model Year: 1991
- J/35C 1990 - number built: 36 - Last Model Year 1994
- J/37C - Introduced: 1989 - Build number included in J/37 Total
- J/39 - Introduced: 1991 - number completed: 21 - Last Model Year: 1993
- J/44 - Introduced: 1989 - number completed: 68 - Last Model Year: 1993
- J/105 1991
- J/80 Introduced: 1993
- J/92 Introduced: 1992 - number completed: 150 - Last Model Year: 2003
- J/130 Introduced: 1992 - number completed: 43 - Last Model Year: 2002
- J/110 Introduced: 1995 - number completed: 16 - Last Model Year: 1997
- J/46 Introduced: 1995 - number completed: 35 - Last Model Year: 2003
- J/160 - Introduced: 1995 - number completed: 35 - Last Model Year: 2004
- J/32 Introduced: 1996 - number completed: 85 - Last Model Year: 2003
- J/125 Introduced: 1997 - number completed: 16 - Last Model Year: 2003
- J/90 Introduced: 1997 - number completed: 5 - Last Model Year: 1998
- J/120 Introduced: 1994 - number completed: 230 - Last Model Year: 2006
- J/42 Introduced: 1995 - number completed: 77 - Last Model Year: 2006
- J/124 Introduced: 2005 - number completed: 35 - Last Model Year: 2007
- J/145 Introduced: 1999 - number completed: 18 - Last Model Year: 2006
- J/109 Introduced: 2004 - number completed: 376 - Last Model Year: 2012
- J/100 2005
- J/92s Introduced: 2005 - Last Model Year: 2012
- J/133 2006
- J/122 2008
- J/65 2008
- J/97 2008 (US)
- J/97E 2008 (France)
- J/95 2009
- J/111 2010
- J/108 2012
- J/70 Introduced: 2012 - Built to: Hull 1900 as of April 2024
- J/88 2013
- J/122E 2014
- J/112E 2015
- J/11S 2016
- J/121 2018
- J/99 2019
- J/9 2021
- J/45 2023
- J/40 2024 (New design, distinct from 1984 design)
- J/7 2025
- J/36 2025 (New design derived from J/112E, distinct from 1981 design)

== Boat Of The Year awards ==
Beginning in 1985, Sailing World magazine began awarding Boat Of The Year (BOTY). J/Boats has been the overall winner five times, and a segment winner 17 times.

Overall BOTY:

- J/44 1990
- J/92 1993
- J/100 2005
- J/95 2010
- J/70 2013

Segment Winners

- J/40 1986 Best Domestic 38-40 feet
- J/34C 1988 Best Domestic 34-62 feet
- J/35C 1991 Best 35-40 feet
- J/105 1992 Best Racer/Cruiser
- J/130 1994 Best Club Racer
- J/160 1997 Best Rendezvous Racer
- J/90 1998 Best Sportboat
- J/125 1999 Best PHRF/Sportboat
- J/46 2000 Best Offshore Race
- J/145 2001 Best Racer/Cruiser
- J/94 2010 Best Club Racer
- J/111 2011 Best One-Design Keelboat
- J/88 2014 Best One Design
- J/112E 2017 Best Crossover
- J/131 2018 Best Crossover
- J/99 2020 Best Crossover
- J/45 2023 Best Crossover.

Further, between 1994 and 2008 Cruising World magazine awarded two J/Boats high honors:

- 1995 J/120 BOTY and Best Value Full-Size Winner
- 2004 J/133 Best Performance Cruising Boat

== See also ==
- List of sailboat designers and manufacturers
- Sailing
- Yacht racing
- Sailing (sport)
