= Rod Johnstone =

American sailor (born 1937)

Rodney "Rod" Johnstone
- Born: Rodney Stuart Johnstone; January 15, 1937 (age 89)
- Known for: Founding "J/Boats"
- Spouse: Lucia Johnstone
- Children: Alan Johnstone (VP & chief designer of J/Boats)
- Honours: America and the Sea

Rodney "Rod" Johnstone (born January 15, 1937) is an American sailor who founded the boat builder "J/Boats".

== Personal life ==
Johnstone has a brother, Bob, who he founded their company J/Boats with, a wife, Lucia, who he lives with in Stonington, Connecticut, and a son, Alan who is the chief designer of J/Boats.

He is a member of both the Wadawanuck and Stonington Harbor yacht club as well as a member in the Stonington Harbor Management Commission.

In 2016, he and his brother received the America and the Sea honor, an honor that recognizes the contributions to elements of the sea. They received the honor for their company, J/Boats.

Despite his old age, Johnstone likes to sail, winning championships in several J/boat classes in various Race Weeks. He also competed in the Bermuda Race with his nephew in 2017.

== Early life and careers ==
=== Early life ===
On January 15, 1937, Rodney Stuart Johnstone was born in Glen Ridge, New Jersey. At a young age, Johnstone raced various boats at the Wadawanuck Yacht Club in Stonington, Connecticut and won several club and ECYRA trophies from 1947 to 1954. He and his father, Rob, constructed a homemade Lighting #3310 boat in a garage, which Johnstone used for racing boats like Thistles, 505s, and 470s. He stated that these ships played a role on designing a 24-foot sailboat that would become the J/24. In the 1960s, Johnstone has attended a Westlawn School of Yacht Design correspondence course, but he has never graduated from there (though he did receive an honorary degree sometime later). During the 1970s, he borrowed his neighbor's to spectate a New York Yacht Club reaching start.

=== Careers ===
From 1959 to 1962, Johnstone began designing and constructing sailboats while teaching history at the Millbrook School. He became a yacht broker, operating a brokerage in Stonington and soon took a career as a planner for the submarine builder, Electric Boat Co. He also sold Soundings ads from 1970 to 1977. In 1988, Johnstone and his nephew, Clay Burkhalter, went on to co-found Johnstone Yachts, Inc. to produce his JY 15 sailboat designs.

==== J/Boats ====
Johnstone, along with his brother, has owned the boat builder "J/Boats" since 1977.
