= Micro (keelboat) =

Sailboat class

Micro Cupper
Development
- Builder: Various
- Name: Micro Cupper

Boat
- Displacement: 460 kg (1,014 lb)
- Draft: 1.10 m (3.6 ft)

Hull
- Type: monohull
- Construction: Typically fibreglass
- LOH: 5.50 m (18.0 ft) Max.
- LWL: 5.25 m (17.2 ft) Max.
- Beam: 2.45 m (8.0 ft) Max.

Hull appendages
- Keel: Typically a lifting keel

Rig
- Rig type: Bermuda rig

Sails
- Sailplan: fractional rigged sloop
- Spinnaker area: 18.50 m^{2} (199.1 sq ft)
- Upwind sail area: 18.50 m^{2} (199.1 sq ft)

The Micro Cupper is a sailboat class that was created in 1977 as a results of an initiative by French sailing magazine “Bateaux”. The formula was based on a number of existing boats, including the Corsaire leading to the development of a large fleet of boats from Bénéteau First 18, Jeanneau Microsail, and several smaller manufacturers produced their own Micro (Challenger, Neptune, Kelt).

This rules were intended for one yearly event, the “Micro Cupp” which developed into the Micro Cupper World Championship since the class became a recognised World Sailing class in 1999.

== See also ==
- List of sailing boat types
