= J/24 =

Sailboat class

- Class symbol

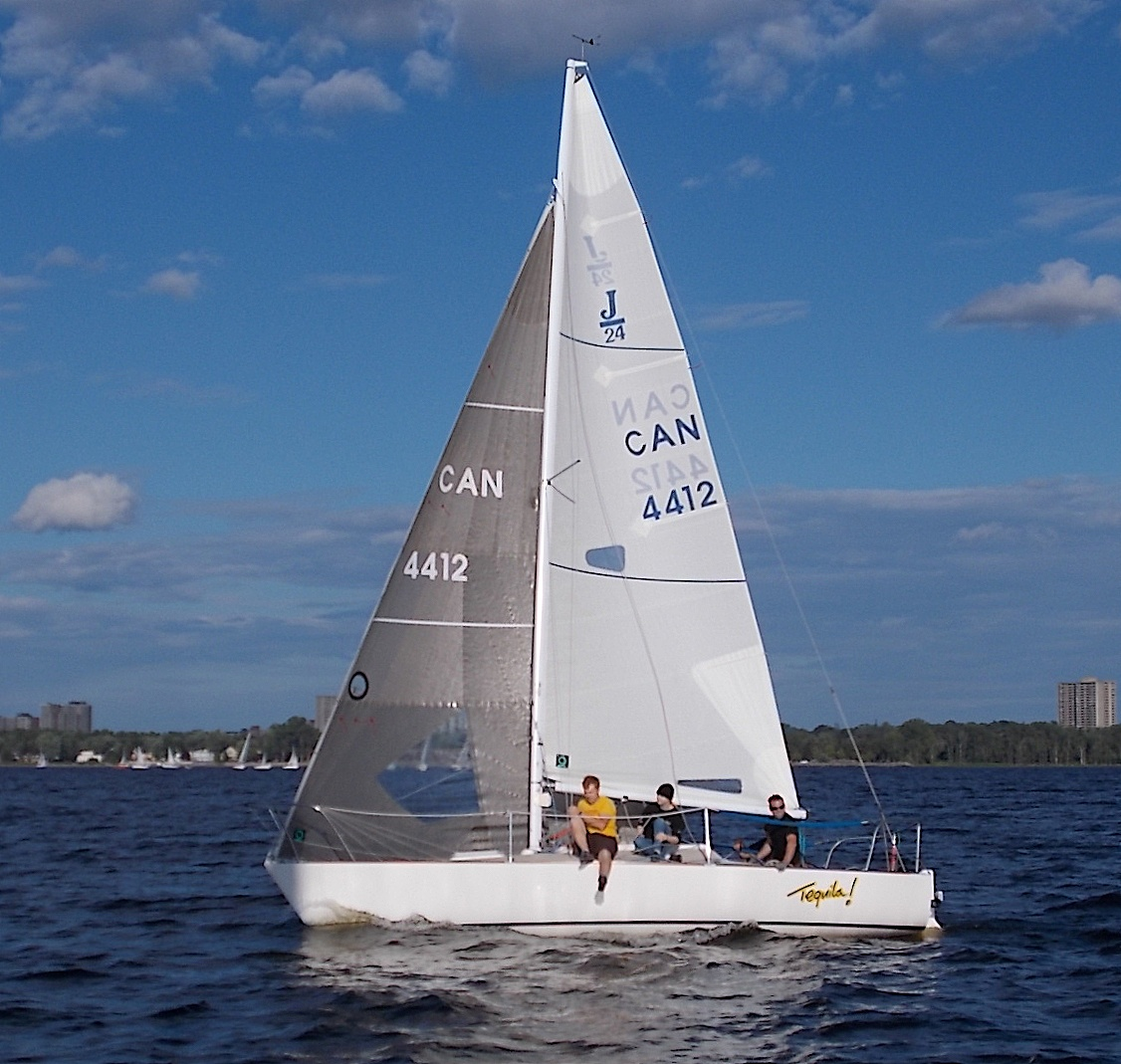

Development
- Designer: Rod Johnstone
- Year: 1977
- Design: One-Design
- Name: J/24

Boat
- Crew: 3 – 6
- Draft: 1.22 m (4 ft 0 in)

Hull
- Type: Monohull
- Construction: GRP
- Hull weight: 1,406 kg (3,100 lb)
- LOA: 7.32 m (24.0 ft)
- LWL: 6.10 m (20.0 ft)
- Beam: 2.71 m (8 ft 11 in)

Hull appendages
- Keel: Fixed

Rig
- Rig type: Fractional rig

Sails
- Mainsail area: 12.68 m^{2} (136.5 sq ft)
- Jib/genoa area: 11.58 m^{2} (124.6 sq ft)
- Spinnaker area: 41.7 m^{2} (449 sq ft)

Racing
- PHRF: 174

The J/24 is a one-design racing keelboat and the first J/Boats product. It achieved global success, with more than 5,200 built, though it is now out of production. It is recognised by World Sailing and supports active competitive fleets and championships worldwide, including the J/24 World Championship.

The first J/24 was built in 1976 by then amateur designer Rodney Johnstone. At a time when sailing was dominated by the International Offshore Rule, the boat was designed to compete under a variety of handicaps, including the MORC. It was immediately successful in racing. Rodney partnered with his brother Bob (then a marketing vice-president at AMF) to form J/Boats. Tillotson-Pearson put the boat into production. With a low price, astute marketing, and heavy promotion, 1,200 were sold in the first two years.

Since then it has been produced by a number of licensed builders, all tightly controlled by the class association and J-Boats.

== Construction ==
Both the deck and hull are fibreglass with an end-grain balsa core, and a vinylester outer skin.

== Design ==
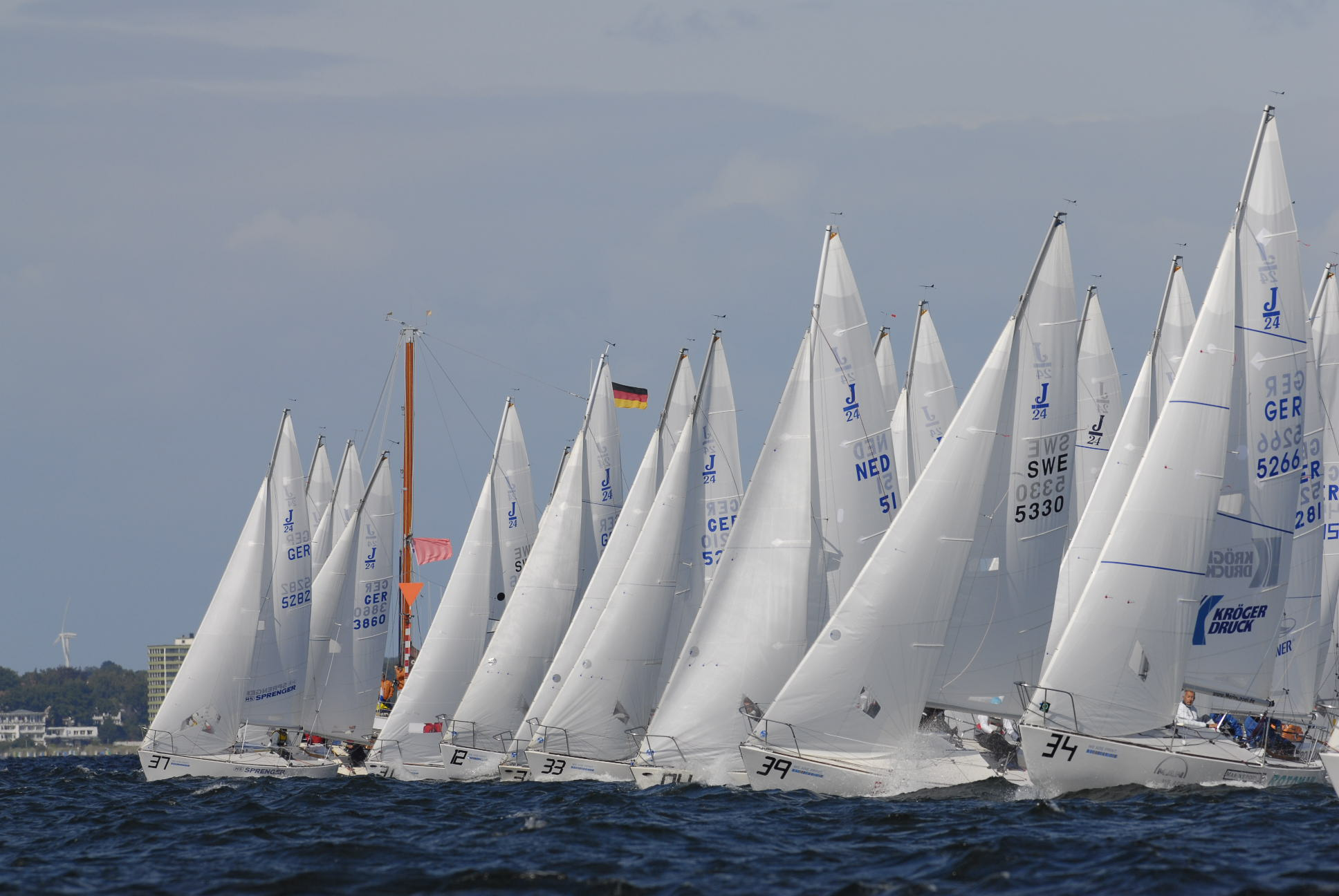
Race in the 2007 J/24 European Championship

=== Rig ===
The rig is fractional with a backstay adjuster. The lower shrouds attach aft of the keel-stepped mast and are adjusted along with the backstay. Running rigging includes a mainsheet traveller, outhaul, vang, cunningham, reefing lines, and topping lift. It may be equipped with a spinnaker. Tracks are provided for both the genoa and jib sheets.

=== Hull ===
The rudder is hung on the plumb transom, and controlled by a tiller. It is equipped with a fixed outboard bracket. Class rules specify one outboard motor of at least 12 kg. It displaces 3,100 lb (1,406 kg) and has a hull speed of 6.0 kn (11.1 km/h). The fixed fin keel is bolted on and weighs 950 pounds and gives the boat a 4.00 ft (1.22 m) draft. It is usually launched by crane, hoisted from a lifting bar bolted to the keel.

The high displacement to length ratio dates the design compared to today's standards, as does the water line length, being 4 ft shorter than the length overall.

=== Interior ===
The simple and functional interior has very little headroom and is usually used only for sail storage, although the two settees and "V"-berth provide berths for four. There is a sink but no fixed head. A portable icebox doubles as the companionway step.

=== Class authority ===
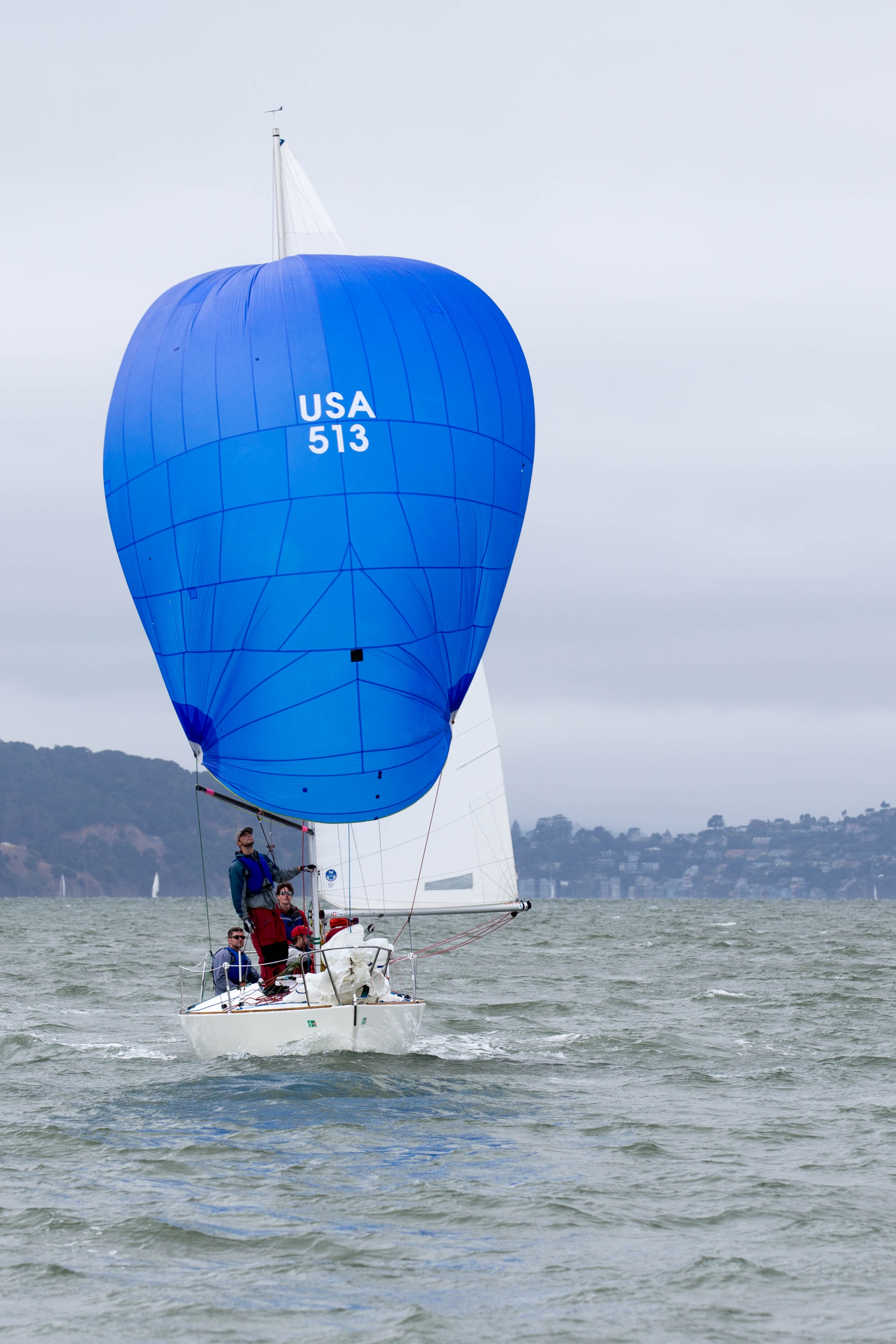
J/24 sailing downwind in San Francisco Bay

The international authority for the class is World Sailing, which cooperates with the International J/24 Class Association on all matters regarding the rules. The International J24 Class Association (IJCA) has the sole authority worldwide for the conduct and management of the International J/24 Class. IJCA is a "not-for-profit" organization. There are 136 active fleets in the US.
