= 1955 Star World Championship =

Event title
- Edition: 33rd

Event details
- Venue: Havana, Cuba
- Yachts: Star
- Titles: 1

Competitors
- Competitors: 74
- Competing nations: 10

Results
- (gold) Gold: (Cuba) de Cárdenas & de Cárdenas
- (silver) Silver: (Cuba) de Cárdenas & Garcia Tunon
- (bronze) Bronze: (United States) Gentzlinger & Farrand

The 1955 Star World Championship was held in Havana, Cuba in 1955.

== Results ==
Results of individual races
Pos	Boat name	Crew	Country	I	II	III	IV	V	Pts
Gold medal	Kurush V	Carlos de Cárdenas; Carlos de Cárdenas Jr.	Cuba	5	2	5	2	6	170
Silver medal	Kurush IV	Jorge de Cárdenas; Alberto Garcia Tunon	Cuba	15	1	1	5	2	166
Bronze medal	Vengeance	William Gentzlinger; Clair L. Farrand	United States	18	6	4	8	7	147
4	North Star II	Lowell North; James B. Hill	United States	9	7	3	10	16	145
5	Conch	Basil Kelly; David Kelly	Bahamas	17	8	6	9	5	145
6	Gam II	Philippe Chancerel; Michel Parent	France	3	9	12	13	10	143
7	Shannon	E. W. Etchells; Charles Dominy	United States	31	16	2	1	3	137
8	Boomerang	John K. Todd; Jack W. Streeton	United States	1	20	20	6	9	134
9	Faneca	Duarte de Almeida Bello; Jose Bustorff	Portugal	16	25	8	4	4	133
10	Circus	Howard Lippincott; R. Lippincott	United States	6	17	14	17	8	128
11	Stormy	Bill Ficker; Don K. Edler	United States	21	5	17	7	10	128
12	Bu IV	Jorge F. Geyer; Harry Adler	Brazil	13	15	7	14	14	127
13	Merope II	Agostino Straulino; Nicolò Rode	Italy	4	18	WDR	3	1	126
14	Dingo	James M. Schoonmaker; Albert Worthen	United States	20	14	15	11	11	119
15	Magic	Richard Stearns; Stanley Fahlstrom	United States	29	4	11	20	17	109
16	Vega IV	C. W. Lyon Jr. Owen P. Merrill	United States	10	22	22	15	13	108
17	Candide	Albert Debarge; A. K. de Bokay	France	14	13	10	DNF	26	89
18	Citation	William Parks; Robert Halperin	United States	30	10	9	DNF	18	85
19	Cygnet	Owen C. Torrey; Paul Smart	United States	22	28	18	19	20	83
20	Twin Star	Read Ruggles Jr. Ellis F. Muther	United States	2	21	16	31	DNF	82
21	En Garde	Cal Hadden Jr. August Lorber	United States	32	3	13	DNF	23	81
22	Chuckle	Harold Halsted; Ernst Pfrunder	United States	12	19	24	16	DNF	81
23	Kismet	Mead Batchelor; Donald Spengler	United States	19	11	29	23	28	80
24	Scylla	Charles Ulmer; Herbert Hild	United States	7	26	23	29	27	78
25	Encore	H. Stephenson; Walter Lindemann	United States	25	39	27	12	15	76
26	Pimm	Walter von Hütschler; Peter D. Siemsen	Brazil	8	29	21	21	DSQ	73
27	Shadrach	Gary Comer; John W. Bennett	United States	11	30	19	DSA	19	73
28	Paka VI	Paul E. Fischer; Claus Wunderlich	West Germany	28	24	25	22	22	69
29	Caprice	Roberto Ciappa; Carlo Rolandi	Italy	27	12	DNS	18	DSQ	67
30	Blue Chip	David Glillard; John Rieger	United States	24	31	30	28	24	53
31	Shillalah	Daniel Catlin; J. Titterington	United States	23	27	DSA	26	29	47
32	Katia II	Michel Gautier; Jean L. Domerc	Morocco	34	36	28	24	25	43
33	Brisote	Alfredo Maruri; Oscar Espinosa	Cuba	33	DSA	26	30	21	42
34	Waterwitch	Charles H. Dole; A. D. Johnson	United States	35	23	DSA	27	30	37
35	Scotch Mist	Philip Somervell; William Rhawn	United States	26	34	DSQ	25	31	36
36	Twinkle	Roy Mitchell; Jean Mitchell	Great Britain	36	33	32	32	32	25
37	Scoot	John C. Dengler; Frederick Dasson	United States	37	32	31	33	DNF	18

Legend: DNF – Did not finish; DSA – Disabled; DSQ – Disqualified; WDR – Withdrew;
