= 1952 Star World Championship =

Event title
- Edition: 30th

Event details
- Venue: Cascais, Portugal
- Yachts: Star
- Titles: 1

Competitors
- Competitors: 58
- Competing nations: 11

Results
- (gold) Gold: (Italy) Straulino & Rode
- (silver) Silver: (United States) Lippincott & Hubers
- (bronze) Bronze: (Portugal) Bello & Bello

The 1952 Star World Championship was held in Cascais, Portugal in 1952.

== Results ==
Results of individual races
Pos	Boat name	Crew	Country	I	II	III	IV	V	Pts
Gold medal	Merope	Agostino Straulino; Nicolò Rode	Italy	1	1	1	2	3	142
Silver medal	Flower	Robert Lippincott; Dan Hubers	United States	6	6	3	11	7	117
Bronze medal	Faneca	Duarte de Almeida Bello; Fernando Bello	Portugal	7	15	6	1	8	113
4	Espadarte II	Joaquim Fiúza; Francisco de Andrade	Portugal	10	10	17	3	2	108
5	Elletra	Tito Nordio; Livio Sangulin	Italy	8	5	2	DSQ	1	104
6	Scylla	Charles Ulmer; Sloane Farrington	United States	9	11	5	19	9	97
7	Dingo	James M. Schoonmaker; Durward Knowles	United States	3	21	10	6	13	97
8	Ma' Lindo	João Miguel Tito; Alberto Graça	Portugal	18	3	15	14	5	95
9	Kurush IV	Carlos de Cárdenas; Carlos de Cárdenas Jr.	Cuba	5	12	20	15	4	94
10	Mari-Tim	Timoleon Razelos; Andreas Ziro	Greece	15	4	16	4	19	92
11	Faneca	Mario Rivelli; G. Schettino	Italy	16	17	8	7	14	88
12	Bu III	O. Dias; Tacariju de Paula	Brazil	21	7	4	17	18	83
13	Paka V	Paul E. Fischer; Claus Wunderlich	West Germany	11	18	18	18	6	79
14	Comanche	Jack Price; Paul Smart	United States	2	22	14	5	WDR	77
15	Gam	Philippe Chancerel; J. Maraut	France	12	9	19	23	10	77
16	Pedrito IV	Ernesto de Mendonca; Antonio Silva	Portugal	14	19	23	8	12	74
17	Aloha V	Yves Lorion; J. Lorion	France	19	16	12	10	20	73
18	Perifidia III	H. Looser; J. Both	Switzerland	22	23	11	13	11	70
19	Ali Baba IV	Hans Bryner; Kurt Bryner	Switzerland	17	2	21	WDR	17	63
20	Fiadolin	D. Selara; A. Pelloti	Italy	DSQ	13	7	12	WDR	58
21	Vega	Fred. Mercier; J. Rousse	France	13	20	13	WDR	21	53
22	Ayono	E. Perrissol; A. Moses	France	24	14	22	9	WDR	51
23	Tremontane III	J. Herbulot; A. Debarge	France	WDR	8	27	20	16	49
24	Shannon	E. W. Etchells; J. Reynes	United States	4	WDR	9	DNS	DNS	47
25	Pandar III	C. Blankenburg; O. Schlenzka	West Germany	23	24	26	21	15	41
26	Willy Nilly	J. Mitchell; Mitchell	Great Britain	20	WDR	25	16	24	35
27	Saucy Sue	S. H. N. Tay; F. Thieck	Morocco	26	26	24	24	23	27
28	Fada III	Pierre de Montaut; J. de Montaut	France	25	27	28	25	22	23
29	Itrane	C. Metral; J. Coursol	Morocco	27	25	DSQ	22	WDR	16

Legend: DNS – Did not start; DSQ – Disqualified; WDR – Withdrew;
