= Star World Championship =

International one-design racing keelboat regattas

- First held: 1923
- Organizer: International Star Class Yacht Racing Association
- Classes: Star
- Champions: Paul Cayard & Frithjof Kleen (2025)
- Most titles: Lowell North & Bruno Prada (5)
- Website: https://worlds.starchampionships.org

The Star World Championship are international sailing regattas in the Star class organized by the International Star Class Yacht Racing Association and sanctioned by World Sailing.

American sailor Lowell North has won the most titles, with five titles between 1945 and 1973 and another seven podiums. Brazilian crew Bruno Prada won also five titles between 2007 and 2019. The most crowned skipper-crew combinations are Italian duo Agostino Straulino and Nicolò Rode and Brazilian duo Robert Scheidt and Bruno Prada, with three titles each. Bill Buchan Jr. has three titles, but with different crew.

American sailors have won the most championships, 55 editions, followed by Brazilian sailors, with seven titles, and sailors of Italy with six titles and Germany with five.

Several winners have family relations with each other, e.g. two-time winner Mark Reynolds and 1971 winning crew James Reynolds, 1992 champion Carl Buchan and three-time winner Bill Buchan Jr., 1969 winner Pelle Petterson and his son-in-law 1988 winner Paul Cayard, and the 1954 and 1955 winning father and son couple Carlos de Cárdenas and Carlos de Cárdenas Jr.

The Star was an Olympic class from 1932 to 2012 with the exception of 1976, when it was substituted by the Tempest.

== History ==
The first Star World Championships were held on Central Long Island Sound in 1923 and organised by the Bayside Yacht Club, Washington Yacht Club and Manhasset Bay Yacht Club. Eight boats fought for the trophy and the winner was the yacht Taurus with William Inslee and Robert Nelson of Western Long Island Sound fleet.

For the first years, all the championships were held in North America and mostly American sailors participated; the first championships held outside North America were in 1939, in Kiel, Germany.

== Editions ==
Date			Host			Athletes			Boats				Ref.
Ed.	Dates	Year	Host club	City	Country	Ath.	Nat	Cont	Boats	M	F	Mx	Ref.
1		1923	Bayside Yacht Club & Port Washington Yacht Club Day & Manhasset Bay Yacht Club	Western Long Island Sound	United States								
2		1924		Western Long Island Sound	United States								
3		1925		Western Long Island Sound	United States								
4		1926		Western Long Island Sound	United States								
5		1927		Narragansett Bay	United States								
6		1928		Newport Beach	United States								
7		1929		New Orleans	United States								
8		1930		Chesapeake Bay	United States								
9	12-19 Sep	1931	Manhasset Bay Yacht Club	Port Washington, Nassau Co., New York	United States								
10		1932	Pequot Yacht Club	Southport, Connecticut	United States								
11		1933	Newport Harbor Yacht Club	Newport Beach, California	United States								
12		1934	San Francisco Yacht Club	Belvedere, California	United States								
13		1935	Newport Harbor Yacht Club and Balboa Yacht Club	Newport Harbor	United States								
14		1936	Rochester Yacht Club	Rochester, Monroe County, New York	United States								
15		1937	Manhasset Bay Yacht Club	Port Washington, Nassau Co., New York	United States								
16		1938	San Diego Yacht Club and Coronado Yacht Club	San Diego	United States								
17		1939	Yacht-Club von Deutschland	Kiel	Germany								
18		1940	San Diego Yacht Club	San Diego, California	United States								
19		1941		Los Angeles	United States								
20		1942	Columbia Yacht Club	Chicago, Illinois	United States								
21		1943		Great South Bay	United States								
22		1944	Chicago Yacht Club	Chicago	United States								
23		1945	Stamford Yacht Club	Stamford	United States								
24		1946		Havana	Cuba								
25		1947		Los Angeles	United States								
26		1948		Cascais	Portugal								
27		1949		Chicago	United States								
28		1950		Chicago	United States								
29		1951		Gibson Island	United States								
30		1952		Cascais	Portugal								
31		1953		Naples	Italy								
32		1954		Cascais	Portugal								
33		1955		Havana	Cuba								
34		1956		Naples	Italy								
35		1957		Havana	Cuba								
36		1958	San Diego Yacht Club	San Diego	United States								
37		1959		Newport Beach	United States								
38		1960		Rio de Janeiro	Brazil								
39			San Diego Yacht Club	San Diego, California	United States								
40		1962		Cascais	Portugal								
41		1963	Sheridan Shore Yacht Club and Chicago Yacht Club	Chicago	United States								
42		1964	Cottage Park Yacht Club	Winthrop, Boston Harbor, Massachusetts	United States								
43		1965	Newport Harbor Yacht Club	Newport Beach, California	United States	25			70				
44		1966	Kieler Yacht-Club	Kiel	West Germany								
45		1967	Skovshoved Sejlklub	Copenhagen	Denmark								
N/A		1968	Olympic Year Not Held										
46		1969	San Diego Yacht Club	San Diego, California	United States								
47		1970		Marstrand	Sweden								
48		1971	Corinthian Yacht Club of Seattle and Seattle Yacht Club	Puget Sound	United States								
49		1972	Club Puerto Azul	Caracas	Venezuela								
50		1973		San Diego	United States								
51		1974		Laredo	Spain								
52		1975		Lake Michigan	United States								
53		1976	Nassau Yacht Club	Nassau, Bahamas	Bahamas								
54		1977	Kieler Yacht-Club	Kiel, Schleswig-Holstein	Germany								
55		1978	St. Francis Yacht Club	Berkeley, San Francisco, California	United States								
56		1979		Marstrand	Sweden								
57		1980	Iate Clube do Rio de Janeiro	Rio de Janeiro	Brazil								
58		1981	Eastern Yacht Club	Marblehead, Massachusetts	United States								
59	19–26 September	1982		Medemblik	Netherlands								
60	9–19 August	1983	California Yacht Club	Marina del Rey, California	United States								
61	30 March – 6 April	1984		Vilamoura	Portugal								
62	6–24 November	1985	Nassau Yacht Club	Nassau, Bahamas	Bahamas								
63	10–21 September	1986		Capri	Italy	220	18		110				
64	19–30 August	1987		Chicago	United States								
65	19–31 January	1988	Club Náutico Olivos	Olivos, Buenos Aires	Argentina								
66	6–17 September	1989	Yacht Club Costa Smeralda	Porto Cervo, Sardinia	Italy								
67	24–30 September	1990	Cleveland Yacht Club	Cleveland	United States	190			95				
68	9–20 October	1991	Yacht Club de Cannes	Cannes	France	138			119				
69	10–18 October	1992		San Francisco	United States								
70	8–19 September	1993		Kiel	Germany								
71	7–18 September	1994	San Diego Yacht Club	San Diego, California	United States	192			96				
72	10–16 September	1995		Laredo	Spain								
73	9–21 January	1996		Rio de Janeiro	Brazil	122	15	4	61				
74	3–14 September	1997	Eastern Yacht Club	Marblehead, Massachusetts	United States								
75	13–18 September	1998		Portorož	Slovenia								
76	1–12 September	1999		Punta Ala	Italy								
77	14–20 May	2000	Annapolis Yacht Club	Annapolis, Maryland	United States								
78	2–12 August	2001		Medemblik	Netherlands								
79	15–23 August	2002	California Yacht Club	Marina del Rey, California	United States								
80	11–24 September	2003		Cádiz	Spain								
81	23 April – 1 May	2004		Gaeta	Italy	204							
82	12–18 February	2005	Club Náutico Olivos	Olivos, Buenos Aires	Argentina	204	28	5	101				
83	1–6 October	2006	St. Francis Yacht Club	Berkeley, San Francisco, California	United States	132							
84	28 June – 13 July	2007	Clube Naval de Cascais	Cascais	Portugal								
85	11–18 April	2008	Coral Reef Yacht Club	Miami, Florida	United States	208	31	5	104				
86	2–9 August	2009	Varbergs Segelsällskap	Varberg	Sweden	172	24	5	86				
87	12–23 January	2010	Iate Clube do Rio de Janeiro	Rio de Janeiro	Brazil	146	20	4	73				
88	3–18 December	2011		Perth	Australia	82	22	5	41				
89	5–11 May	2012		Hyères	France	144	29	5	72				
90	1–7 September	2013	San Diego Yacht Club	San Diego, California	United States	132			66				
91	30 June – 7 July	2014	Fraglia Vela Malcesine	Malcesine, Lake Garda	Italy	174	18	3	87				
92	1–10 November	2015	Club Náutico San Isidro	San Isidro	Argentina	78							
93	7–17 April	2016	Coral Reef Yacht Club	Miami	United States	144	16	3	72				
94	1–8 July	2017	Troense Bådelaug	Svendborg	Denmark	78	12	3	70				
95	5–15 October	2018	Tred Avon Yacht Club	Oxford, Maryland	United States	120	14	4	60				
96	13–23 June	2019	Yacht Club Costa Smeralda	Porto Cervo, Sardinia	Italy	126	20	4	63				
N/A	13–21 November	2020	Coral Reef Yacht Club; Biscayne Bay Yacht Club	Miami	United States	cancelled due to the COVID-19 pandemic							
97	4–11 September	2021	Kieler Yacht-Club	Kiel, Schleswig-Holstein	Germany	164	16	4	82				
98	8–17 September	2022	Eastern Yacht Club	Marblehead, Massachusetts	United States	168	16	5	84				
99	16–24 September	2023	Yacht Club Isole di Toscana	Scarlino	Italy	192	21	4	96				
100	4–13 September	2024	San Diego Yacht Club	San Diego	United States	129	16	5	64				
101	8-13 September	2025	Jedriličarski klub Mornar	Split, Croatia	Croatia	202	19	4	101				

== Medalists ==
Year	Gold	Silver	Bronze	Ref.
1923	Taurus (USA); William Inslee; Robert Nelson	Astrea (CAN); Harry Wylie; Ernest Ratsey	Doris (USA); R. Walton; L. Carey	
1924	Little Bear (USA); Jack Robinson; Arthur Knapp Jr.	Rhody (USA); Ben Comstock; William Gidley	California (USA); B. Weston; R. Schauer	
1925	Ace (USA); Adrian Iselin; Ed Willis	Auriga (CAN); G. H. C. Phillips; C. G. Davis	Movie Star II (USA); B. Rey Schauer; Ed. Gillett	
1926	Rhody (USA); Ben Comstock; William Gidley	Ardora (USA); D. Starring; F. Bedford	Dona Bertha (USA); H. Fisher; H. Denhie	
1927	Tempe III (USA); Walt Hubbard Jr. Richard Edwards	Coleen (USA); F. Bedford; B. Cunningham	Mackerel (USA); H. Smith; W. Henderson	
1928	Sparkler II (USA); Prentice Edrington; Gilbert Gray	Okla (USA); Joseph Watkins; Arthur Knapp Jr.	Windward (USA); J. Jessop; J. Sykes	
1929	Eel (USA); Graham Johnson; C. Lowndes Johnson	Sparkler II (USA); Gilbert Gray; Prentice Edrington	Okla II (USA); Joseph Watkins; William McHugh	
1930	Peggy Wee (USA); Arthur Knapp Jr. Newell Weed	Tempe IV (USA); W. Hubbard; T. Dittmar	Okla II (USA); Joseph Watkins; William McHugh	
1931	Coleen (USA); William McHugh; Joseph Watkins	Joy (GBR); Colin Ratsey; S. Elsbree	Zoa (USA); Edward Fink; A. McCrate	
1932	Mist (USA); Edward Fink; Edwin Thorne	Wings (USA); C. Pflug; J. Pflug	Laura G (USA); Ralph Bradley; P. Singer	
1933	Three Star (USA); William Glenn Waterhouse; Woodbridge Metcalf	Mist (USA); Edwin Thorne; Landon K. Thorne	Chip (USA); Herbert Dowsett Jr. H. White	
1934	By-C (USA); Hook Beardslee; Myron Lehmann	Andiamo III (USA); John Arms; J. Abberley	Ace (USA); Adrian Iselin; W. White	
1935	By-C (USA); Hook Beardslee; Myron Lehmann	Ace (USA); Adrian Iselin; Ed Willis	Three Star (USA); William Glenn Waterhouse; Woodbridge Metcalf	
1936	Ace (USA); Adrian Iselin; Garrett Horder	By-C (USA); Hook Beardslee; Myron Lehmann	Chuckle II (USA); Harold Halsted; Wilmot Halsey	
1937	Lecky (USA); Milton Wegeforth; Ernest Phillips	Pimm (GER); Walter von Hütschler; Hans-Joachim Weise	Chuckle II (USA); Harold Halsted; Wilmot Halsey	
1938	Pimm (GER); Walter von Hütschler; Hans-Joachim Weise	Gale (USA); Harry Gale Nye Jr. Myron Lehmann	Mercury (USA); J. McAleese; F. Graham	
1939	Pimm (GER); Walter von Hütschler; Egon Beyn	Polluce (ITA); Agostino Straulino; Nicolò Rode	Maggel (GER); Peter Hansohm; Christian Blankenburg	
1940	Rambunctious (USA); James Cowie; Gordon Cowie	Jade (USA); Robert White; Robert Holcomb	Twin Star (USA); Lockwood Pirie; Richard Miller	
1941 Los Angeles	Wench (USA); George Fleitz; William Severence	Gale (USA); Harry Gale Nye Jr. Jim Michael	Scout III (USA); Myron Lehmann; Paul McKibben	
1942 Lake Michigan	United States; Harry Gale Nye Jr. Stanley Fahlstrom	United States; Sterling Potter; Ed Douglass	United States; Tommy Scripps; Maurice Watson	
1943 Great South Bay	United States; Arthur Deacon; Perry Roehm	United States; W. H. Picken Jr. Joseph Forrington	Cuba; Carlos de Cárdenas; G. Carricaburu	
1944 Lake Michigan	United States; Gerald Driscoll; Malin Burnham	United States; Robert Lippincott; Ed Shivelhood	United States; Herbert Williams; A. Nye	
1945 Central Long Island Sound	United States; Malin Burnham; Lowell North	United States; James Cowie; Walter Krug	United States; E. W. Etchells; Mary Etchells	
1946 Havana	Wench II (USA); George Fleitz; Walter Krug	Pagan (USA); Robert White; Gordon Holcombe	Gem II (BAH); Durward Knowles; Basil Kelly	
1947 Los Angeles	Gem II (BAH); Durward Knowles; Sloane Farrington	Hilarius (USA); Hilary Smart; Stan Ogilvy	Glider (USA); Richard Stearns; Robert Rodgers	
1948 Cascais	Twin Star (USA); Lockwood Pirie; Harry Rugeroni	Polluce (ITA); Agostino Straulino; Nicolò Rode	Hilarius (USA); Hilary Smart; Paul Smart	
1949 Chicago	Gale (USA); Harry Gale Nye Jr. Stanley Fahlstrom	Blue Star II (USA); Robert Lippincott; Robert Levin	Flame (USA); Stan Ogilvy; Owen Torrey	
1950 Chicago	Sea Robin (USA); Robert Lippincott; Robert Levin	Twin Star (USA); Lockwood Pirie; Charles Tuttle	Shillalah (USA); E. W. Etchells; Mary Etchells	
1951 Gibson Island	Shillalah (USA); E. W. Etchells; Mary Etchells	Magic (USA); Richard Stearns; Robert Rodgers	Flame (USA); Stan Ogilvy; Whitney Stueck	
1952 Cascais	Merope (ITA); Agostino Straulino; Nicolò Rode	Flower (USA); Robert Lippincott; Dan Hubers	Faneca (POR); Duarte Manuel Bello; Fernando Bello	
1953 Naples	Merope II (ITA); Agostino Straulino; Nicolò Rode	Faneca (POR); Duarte Manuel Bello; João Miguel Tito	Asterope (ITA); Tito Nordio; Livio Sangulin	
1954 Cascais	Kurush V (CUB); Carlos de Cárdenas; Carlos de Cárdenas Jr.	Gem II (BAH); Durward Knowles; Sloane Farrington	Merope II (ITA); Agostino Straulino; Nicolò Rode	
1955 Havana	Kurush V (CUB); Carlos de Cárdenas; Carlos de Cárdenas Jr.	Kurush IV (CUB); Jorge de Cárdenas; Alberto Garcia Tunon	Vengeance (USA); William Gentzlinger; Clair L. Farrand	
1956 Naples	Merope II (ITA); Agostino Straulino; Nicolò Rode	North Star III (USA); Lowell North; James B. Hill	Kurush IV (CUB); Álvaro de Cárdenas; Jorge de Cárdenas	
1957 Havana	North Star III (USA); Lowell North; James B. Hill	Candide (FRA); Albert Debarge; Paul Elvstrøm	Star of the Sea (BAH); Joseph Duplin; Peter Wilhauser	
1958 San Diego	Nhycusa (USA); William P. Ficker; Mark Yorston	Perseverance (USA); Chick Rollins; William Pickford	Dingo (USA); Ding Schoonmaker; Malin Burnham	
1959 Newport Harbour	North Star III (USA); Lowell North; Mort Carlile	Turmoil (USA); Gary Comer; Bill Hackel	Nhycusa (USA); William P. Ficker; Tom Skahill	
1960 Rio de Janeiro	North Star III (USA); Lowell North; Tom Skahill	Deacon (USA); Donald K. Edler; Kent Edler	Fierce (USA); Robert Lippincott; Frank Hogg	
1961 San Diego Bay	Frolic (USA); William Earl Buchan; Douglas Knight	Tranquil (USA); John Bennett; John McKeague	North Star IV (USA); Lowell North; Tom Skahill	
1962 Cascais	Glider (USA); Richard Stearns; Lynn Williams	Faneca (POR); Duarte Bello; Fernando Bello	Shanty (USA); E. W. Etchells; R. M. Allan III	
1963 Chicago	Star of the Sea (USA); Joseph Duplin; Francis Dolan	North Star (USA); Lowell North; Tom Skahill	Wayward Wind (USA); Blair Fletcher; Asa L. Colson	
1964 Boston Harbour	Big Daddy (USA); Donald K. Edler; Kent Edler	Star of the Sea (USA); Joseph Duplin; Francis Dolan	Chatterbox (USA); Malin Burnham; Charles Lewsadder	
1965 Newport Harbour	Mache (USA); Donald Bever; Charles Lewsadder	Chatterbox (USA); Malin Burnham; James Reynolds	Frolic (USA); William Earl Buchan; Douglas Knight	
1966 Kiel	Scandale (DEN); Paul Elvstrøm; John Albrechtson	North Star (USA); Lowell North; Peter Barrett	Glider (USA); Richard Stearns; Lynn Williams	
1967 Copenhagen	Scandale (DEN); Paul Elvstrøm; Poul Mik-Meyer	North Star (USA); Lowell North; Peter Barrett	Swingin' Star (USA); Donald Trask; William Kreysler	
1968	not held because of the 1968 Summer Olympics			
1969 San Diego	Humbug VII (SWE); Pelle Petterson; Ulf Schröder	Good Grief! (USA); Tom Blackaller; Gary Mull	North Star (USA); Lowell North; Peter Barrett	
1970 Marstrand	Frolic (USA); William Earl Buchan; Carl F. Sutter	Dingo (USA); Ding Schoonmaker; Arne Åkerson	Blott X (SWE); Stig Wennerström; Sture Christensson	
1971 Seattle	Menace (USA); Dennis Conner; James Reynolds	Something Else (USA); Lowell North; Peter Barrett	Contact (SWE); John Albrechtson; Göran Tell	
1972 Caracas	Sunny (FRG); Wilhelm Kuhweide; Karsten Meyer	Buho Blanco (BRA); Jörg Bruder; Cláudio Biekarck	Dingo (USA); Ding Schoonmaker; Thomas Dudinsky	
1973 San Diego	North Star (USA); Lowell North; Peter Barrett	Frolic (USA); William Earl Buchan; Craig Thomas	Streaker (USA); Tom Blackaller; Ron Anderson	
1974 Laredo	Swift (USA); Tom Blackaller; Ron Anderson	Humbug XVIII (SWE); Pelle Petterson; Ingvar Hansson	Gem (BAH); Durward Knowles; Jerry Ford	
1975 Lake Michigan	Dingo (USA); Ding Schoonmaker; Jerry Ford	Impossible (USA); Tom Blackaller; Ron Anderson	Virgo III (USA); Peter Wright; Bill Wright	
1976 Nassau	Mustard Seed (USA); James Allsopp; Michael Guhin	Frolic (USA); William Earl Buchan; Earl Lasher	Suzanne (USA); Barton Beek; William Munster	
1977 Kiel	United States; Dennis Conner; Ron Anderson	Sweden; Sune Carlsson; Leif Carlsson	West Germany; Uwe von Below; Franz Wehofsich	
1978 San Francisco	United States; Buddy Melges; Andreas Josenhans	United States; Dennis Conner; Ron Anderson	United States; Tom Blackaller; Ed Bennett	
1979 Marstrand	United States; Buddy Melges; Andreas Josenhans	United States; William Earl Buchan; Douglas Knight	United States; Peter Wright; Todd Cozzens	
1980 Rio de Janeiro	Chewbacca (USA); Tom Blackaller; David Shaw	Riky (ITA); Albino Fravezzi; Oscar Dalvit	Findus (ITA); Giorgio Gorla; Alfio Peraboni	
1981 Marblehead	West Germany; Alexander Hagen; Vincent Hösch	United States; Peter Wright; Todd Cozzens	United States; William Earl Buchan; Ron Anderson	
1982 Medemblik	Spain; Antonio Gorostegui; José Luis Doreste	West Germany; Alexander Hagen; Vincent Hösch	United States; William Earl Buchan; Steve Erickson	
1983 Marina del Rey	Spain; Antonio Gorostegui; José Luis Doreste	West Germany; Joachim Griese; Michael Marcour	United States; William Earl Buchan; William Carl Buchan	
1984 Vilamoura	Findus (ITA); Giorgio Gorla; Alfio Peraboni	United States; Andrew Menkart; James Kavle	United States; Paul Cayard; Ken Keefe	
1985 Nassau	United States; William Earl Buchan; Steve Erickson	Netherlands; Steven Bakker; Kobus Vandenberg	United States; Paul Cayard; Ken Keefe	
1986 Isle of Capri	United States; Vicente Brun; Hugo Schreiner	Italy; Giuseppe Milone; Roberto Mottola	United States; Ed Adams; Tom Olsen	
1987 Chicago	United States; Ed Adams; Tom Olsen	West Germany; Alexander Hagen; Fritz Girr	United States; Paul Cayard; Steve Erickson	
1988 Buenos Aires	United States; Paul Cayard; Steve Erickson	United States; Mark Reynolds; Hal Haenel	United States; Ed Adams; Tom Olsen	
1989 Porto Cervo	Era Ora (BRA); Alan Adler; Nelson Falcão	West Germany; Werner Fritz; Ulrich Seeberger	C-Ya (CAN); Ross MacDonald; Bruce MacDonald	
1990 Cleveland	Brazil; Torben Grael; Marcelo Ferreira	Denmark; Benny F. Andersen; Mogens Just	Sweden; Mats Johansson; Stefan Hemlin	
1991 Cannes	Italy; Roberto Benamati; Mario Salani	Brazil; Torben Grael; Marcelo Ferreira	United States; Mark Reynolds; Hal Haenel	
1992 San Francisco	United States; William Carl Buchan; Hugo Schreiner	United States; Joe Londrigan; Phil Trinter	United States; Paul Cayard; Steve Erickson	
1993 Kiel	United States; Joe Londrigan; Phil Trinter	Sweden; Hans Wallén; Bobby Lohse	Germany; Alexander Hagen; Kai Falkenthal	
1994 San Diego	Canada; Ross MacDonald; Eric Jespersen	Brazil; Alan Adler; Rodrigo Meireles	Brazil; Torben Grael; Marcelo Ferreira	
1995 Laredo	United States; Mark Reynolds; Hal Haenel	Brazil; Torben Grael; Marcelo Ferreira	Denmark; Christian Rasmussen; Kasper Harsberg	
1996 Rio de Janeiro	Italy; Enrico Chieffi; Roberto Sinibaldi	United States; Mark Reynolds; Hal Haenel	Brazil; Torben Grael; Marcelo Ferreira	
1997 Marblehead	Germany; Alexander Hagen; Marcelo Ferreira	United States; Mark Reynolds; Magnus Liljedahl	Bermuda; Peter Bromby; Michael Marcel	
1998 Portorož	Australia; Colin Beashel; David Giles	Brazil; Torben Grael; Marcelo Ferreira	Germany; Alexander Hagen; Thorsten Helmert	
1999 Punta Ala	United States; Eric Doyle; Tom Olsen	Canada; Ross MacDonald; Kai Bjorn	United States; Mark Reynolds; Magnus Liljedahl	
2000 Annapolis	United States; Mark Reynolds; Magnus Liljedahl	Canada; Ross MacDonald; Kai Bjorn	Ireland; Mark Mansfield; David O'Brien	
2001 Medemblik	Sweden; Fredrik Lööf; Christian Finnsgård	New Zealand; Gavin Brady; George Iverson	United States; Vicente Brun; Mike Dorgan	
2002 Marina del Rey	Great Britain; Iain Percy; Steve Mitchell	Brazil; Torben Grael; Marcelo Ferreira	France; Xavier Rohart; Yannick Adde	
2003 Cádiz	France; Xavier Rohart; Pascal Rambeau	Sweden; Fredrik Lööf; Anders Ekström	Great Britain; Iain Percy; Steve Mitchell	
2004 Gaeta	Sweden; Fredrik Lööf; Anders Ekström	Switzerland; Flavio Marazzi; Enrico De Maria	Great Britain; Iain Percy; Steve Mitchell	
2005 Buenos Aires	France; Xavier Rohart; Pascal Rambeau	Brazil; Torben Grael; Marcelo Ferreira	Great Britain; Iain Percy; Steve Mitchell	
2006 San Francisco	New Zealand; Hamish Pepper; Carl Williams	Brazil; Robert Scheidt; Bruno Prada	France; Xavier Rohart; Pascal Rambeau	
2007 Cascais	Brazil; Robert Scheidt; Bruno Prada	France; Xavier Rohart; Pascal Rambeau	Great Britain; Iain Percy; Andrew Simpson	
2008 Miami	Poland; Mateusz Kusznierewicz; Dominik Życki	Italy; Diego Negri; Luigi Viale	Brazil; Robert Scheidt; Bruno Prada	
2009 Varberg	United States; George Szabo; Rick Peters	New Zealand; Hamish Pepper; Craig Monk	Brazil; Lars Grael; Ronald Seifert	
2010 Rio de Janeiro	Great Britain; Iain Percy; Andrew Simpson	Switzerland; Flavio Marazzi; Enrico De Maria	Brazil; Torben Grael; Marcelo Ferreira	
2011 Perth	Brazil; Robert Scheidt; Bruno Prada	Germany; Robert Stanjek; Frithjof Kleen	United States; Mark Mendelblatt; Brian Fatih	
2012 Hyères	Brazil; Robert Scheidt; Bruno Prada	Great Britain; Iain Percy; Andrew Simpson	Denmark; Michael Hestbæk; Claus Olesen	
2013 San Diego	United States; John MacCausland; Phil Trinter	United States; Andrew Campbell; John Von Schwarz	United States; Mark Reynolds; Hal Haenel	
2014 Malcesine	Germany; Robert Stanjek; Frithjof Kleen	Italy; Diego Negri; Sergio Lambertenghi	Norway; Eivind Melleby; Bruno Prada	
2015 Buenos Aires	Brazil; Lars Grael; Samuel Gonçalves	Brazil; Marcelo Fuchs; Ronald Seifert	Italy; Diego Negri; Sergio Lambertenghi	
2016 Miami	United States; Augie Diaz; Bruno Prada	Italy; Diego Negri; Sergio Lambertenghi	United States; Brian Ledbetter; Joshua Revkin	
2017 Troense	8317; Eivind Melleby (NOR); Joshua Revkin (USA)	8474; Brazil; Lars Grael; Samuel Gonçalves	8427; Germany; Reinhard Schmidt; Paul Sradnick	
2018 Oxford	BRA 8210; Jorge Joao Zarif (BRA); Guilherme De Almeida (BRA)	NOR 8177; Eivind Melleby (NOR); Joshua Revkin (USA)	USA 8466; Paul Cayard (USA); Arthur Lopes (BRA)	
2019 Porto Cervo	POL 8548; Mateusz Kusznierewicz (POL); Bruno Prada (BRA)	USA 8509; Augie Diaz (USA); Henry Boening (BRA)	NOR 8234; Eivind Melleby (NOR); Joshua Revkin (USA)	
2020 Miami	cancelled due to the COVID-19 pandemic			
2021 Kiel	ITA 8567; Diego Negri (ITA); Frithjof Kleen (GER)	CRO 8540; Tonci Stipanovic (CRO); Tudor Bilic (CRO)	AUT 8529; Johann Spitzauer (AUT); Hans-Christian Nehammer (AUT)	
2022	ITA 2021; Diego Negri (ITA); Sergio Lambertenghi (ITA)	CRO 1991; Tonci Stipanovic (CRO); Tudor Bilic (CRO)	USA 1988; Paul Cayard (USA); Frithjof Kleen (GER)	
2023	GER 8489; Max Kohlhoff (GER); Ole Burzinski (GER)	SUI 8575; Piet Eckert (SUI); Frederico Eckert (SUI)	ITA 8583; Diego Negri (ITA); Alessandro Sodano (ITA)	
2024	USA 8593; John Kostecki (USA); Austin Sperry (USA)	USA 8538; Will Stout (USA); Daniel Cayard (USA)	ARG 8468; Leandro Altolaguirre (ARG); Lucas Altolaguirre (ARG)	
2025	USA 1988; Paul Cayard (USA); Frithjof Kleen (GER)	POL-8602; Mateusz Kusznierewicz (POL); Bruno Prada (BRA)	ITA-8594; Diego Negri (ITA); Sergio Lambertenghi (ITA)	

== Multiple medallists ==
As of 2025

Ranking	Sailor	Gold	Silver	Bronze	Total	No. Entries	Ref.
1	Lowell North (USA)	5	5	2	12	22	
2	Bruno Prada (BRA)	5	2	2	9	18	
3	William Earl Buchan (USA)	3	3	4	10	24	
4	Agostino Straulino (ITA)	3	2	1	6	11	
4	Nicolo Rode (ITA)	3	2	1	6	9	
6	Robert Scheidt (BRA)	3	1	1	5	8	
6	Frithjof Kleen (GER)	3	1	1	5	14	
8	Marcelo Ferreira (BRA)	2	5	3	10	22	
9	Mark Reynolds (USA)	2	3	3	8	29	
9	Diego Negri (ITA)	2	3	3	8	17	
11	Alexander Hagen (FRG)	2	2	2	6	26	
11	Tom Blackaller (USA)	2	2	2	6	15	
11	Ron Anderson (USA)	2	2	2	6	10	
14	Iain Percy (GBR)	2	1	4	7	10	
15	Malin Burnham (USA)	2	1	2	5	16	
15	Xavier Rohart (FRA)	2	1	2	5	15	
17	Adrian Iselin (USA)	2	1	1	4	9	
17	Myron Lehman (USA)	2	1	1	4	9	
17	Pascal Rambeau (FRA)	2	1	1	4	7	
20	Phil Trinter (USA)	2	1	0	3	20	
20	Walter von Hütschler (GER)	2	1	0	3	15	
20	Fredrik Lööf (SWE)	2	1	0	3	12	
20	Dennis Conner (USA)	2	1	0	3	6	
20	Arthur Knapp (USA)	2	1	0	3	5	
20	Hook Beardslee (USA)	2	1	0	3	4	
26	Mateusz Kusznierewicz (POL)	2	1	0	3	10	
26	Paul Elvstrøm (DEN)	2	1	0	3	3	
28	Paul Cayard (USA)	2	0	6	8	19	
29	Steven Erickson (USA)	2	0	3	5	10	
30	Tom Olsen (USA)	2	0	2	4	11	
31	Carlos de Cárdenas (CUB)	2	0	1	3	23	
32	Hugo Schreiner (USA)	2	0	0	2	10	
32	Carlos de Cárdenas Jr. (CUB)	2	0	0	2	9	
32	José Doreste (ESP)	2	0	0	2	7	
32	Stanley Fahlstrom (USA)	2	0	0	2	5	
32	Antonio Gorostegui (ESP)	2	0	0	2	5	
32	W. L. Inslee (USA)	2	0	0	2	5	
32	Buddy Melges (USA)	2	0	0	2	4	
32	Harry Gale Nye Jr. (USA)	2	0	0	2	3	
32	George Fleitz (USA)	2	0	0	2	3	
41	Torben Schmidt Grael (BRA)	1	5	3	9	26	
42	Lars Grael (BRA)	1	1	1	3	7	

== See also ==
- ISAF Sailing World Championships
- World Sailing
