= 1957 Star World Championship =

Event title
- Edition: 35th

Event details
- Venue: Havana, Cuba
- Yachts: Star
- Titles: 1

Competitors
- Competitors: 70
- Competing nations: 9

Results
- (gold) Gold: (United States) North & Hill
- (silver) Silver: (France) Debarge & Elvstrøm
- (bronze) Bronze: (United States) Duplin & Wilhauser

In 1957, Star World Championship was held in Havana, Cuba.

== Results ==
Results of individual races
Pos	Boat name	Crew	Country	I	II	III	IV	V	Pts
Gold medal	North Star III	Lowell North; James B. Hill	United States	1	10	3	4	2	160
Silver medal	Candide	Albert Debarge; Paul Elvstrøm	France	10	1	4	3	12	150
Bronze medal	Star of the Sea	Joseph R. Duplin; Peter Wilhauser	United States	2	7	5	5	16	145
4		Robert Lippincott; George Voss	United States	24	3	11	6	1	135
5	Nhycusa	Bill Ficker; Don K. Edler	United States	4	11	9	8	14	134
6	Kurush IV	Alvaro de Cárdenas; Jorge de Cárdenas	Cuba	5	23	7	10	4	131
7	Shamus	E. W. Etchells; Chas. Dominy	United States	7	4	22	2	18	127
8	Dingo	James M. Schoonmaker; Ken Albury	United States	8	8	28	1	8	127
9	Merope III	Agostino Straulino; Fr. Lapanje	Italy	6	13	8	29	5	119
10	Kurush V	Carlos de Cárdenas; Carlos de Cárdenas Jr.	Cuba	11	30	1	14	7	117
11	Circus	Howard Lippincott; Asa L. Colson	United States	20	16	6	15	10	113
12	Lindoya	C. W. Lyon Jr. Frank Lyon	United States	3	24	19	16	11	107
13	Chuckle	Harold Halsted; Peter Ranken	United States	22	6	2	9	DNF	105
14	Espadarte	Joaquim Fiúza; Fern. Pessoa	Portugal	23	12	12	11	21	101
15	Conch II	Basil Kelly; David Kelly	Bahamas	31	5	15	12	19	98
16	Vice	John W. Bennett; A. Lechner	United States	14	21	23	20	6	96
17	Boomerang II	John K. Todd; Jack W. Streeton	United States	9	2	25	28	23	93
18	Capstar	J. Burbeck Jr. J. Burbeck Sr.	United States	27	15	13	18	17	90
19	Pimm	Walter von Hütschler; C. A. de Brito	Brazil	13	9	31	17	22	88
20	Gem	Durward Knowles; Sloane Farrington	Bahamas	25	29	10	22	9	85
21	Glider	Richard Stearns; Philip Botsolas	United States	12	32	21	30	3	82
22	Wonderland III	Charles H. Dole; Cy Gillette	United States	18	33	16	27	13	73
23	Sea Rocket	Jack Van Dyke; Gerrit Foster	United States	15	17	18	31	27	72
24	Mavaurneen	Hartwell Moore; Everett Prime	United States	17	18	14	25	DNF	70
25	Alegria	Jorge Pontual; George Lotar	Brazil	21	20	20	DNF	15	68
26	Mapamundi II	Alfredo Maruri Jr. Oscar Espinosa	Cuba	19	25	24	26	20	66
27	Robin	Rob. W. Sexauer; Roger Sexauer	United States	33	14	27	13	29	64
28	Faneca	Duarte de Almeida Bello; Manuel Ricciardi	Portugal	29	27	30	7	24	63
29	Breezin' Along	Donald Bever; Paul T. Stack	United States	16	22	DSQ	21	25	60
30	Twin Star	Read Ruggles Jr. Tom Lanni Jr.	United States	30	28	17	23	26	56
31	Kathleen	Herbert Williams; Jerry Leterman	United States	28	19	29	19	DNF	49
32	Clementine	Harry Adler; Luiz Ramos	Brazil	34	31	26	24	28	37
33	Hilarius	Hilary Smart; Paul Smart	United States	26	26	33	32	30	33
34	Twinkle	J. F. Mitchell; Mitchell	Great Britain	32	35	32	33	31	17
35	Nereid	P. Pollard; F. Camejo	Venezuela	35	34	34	34	32	11

Legend: DNF – Did not finish; DSQ – Disqualified;
