= 1950 Star World Championship =

Event title
- Edition: 28th

Event details
- Venue: Chicago, United States
- Yachts: Star
- Titles: 1

Competitors
- Competitors: 82
- Competing nations: 7

Results
- (gold) Gold: (United States) Lippincott & Levin
- (silver) Silver: (United States) Pirie & Turtle
- (bronze) Bronze: (United States) Etchells & Etchells

The 1950 Star World Championship was held in Chicago, United States in 1950.

== Results ==
Results of individual races
Pos	Boat name	Crew	Country	I	II	III	IV	V	Pts
Gold medal	Sea Robin	Robert Lippincott; Robert Levin	United States	1	9	2	2	7	189
Silver medal	Twin Star	Lockwood Pirie; Charles Turtle	United States	6	2	5	5	8	184
Bronze medal	Shillalah	E. W. Etchells; Mary Etchells	United States	14	5	3	1	6	181
4	Luisa III	Tito Nordio; Luigi De Manincor	Italy	5	12	10	6	1	176
5	Merope	Agostino Straulino; Nicolò Rode	Italy	2	3	1	29	2	173
6	Hilarius	Hilary Smart; Paul Smart	United States	3	4	11	9	10	173
7	Scout II	Richard Miller; George Voss	United States	12	6	8	12	3	169
8	Golfinho	João Miguel Tito; M. Bramao	Portugal	8	8	14	14	4	162
9	Santa Cristina	Carlos de Cárdenas; Narciso Gelats	Cuba	11	13	6	10	15	155
10	Flame	Stan Ogilvy; James Stephens	United States	4	7	4	DSA	9	144
11	Gem III	Durward Knowles; Basil Kelly	Bahamas	DSA	1	7	8	11	141
12	Finagle	William Nagle; Alec Nagle Jr.	United States	13	16	13	18	13	137
13	Kathleen	Herbert Williams; Donald Sherwood	United States	17	10	DSA	7	5	129
14	North Star	Lowell North; Brian Hanzal	United States	9	DSA	12	3	17	127
15	Comanche	Jack Price; John Reid	United States	18	DSA	9	4	12	121
16	Jet	Florus Black; Nicholas Kershaw	United States	10	11	20	13	33	121
17	Gull	Harry Havemeyer; J. Hermus	United States	20	15	22	11	21	121
18	Stampede	George Dewar; J. Forrington	United States	19	14	18	16	24	119
19	Shooting	Stan Lippincott; A. Seither	United States	29	19	15	21	14	112
20	Fracas	Edward Fraker; L. Smithline	United States	28	17	26	11	19	105
21	Hell's Angel	August Stoeffler; R. Stoefller	United States	21	22	23	17	22	105
22	Bu II	Tacariju de Paula; Othon Dias	Brazil	23	21	28	19	34	85
23	Chaser II	Bill Ficker; Bergen Hess	United States	DSQ	23	16	26	20	83
24	Oregon Star	J. Cram; W. Cram	United States	31	29	30	20	18	82
25	Urchin	J. Killeen Jr. Harvey Killeen	United States	21	21	27	23	31	79
26	Spitfire	George Parsons; George Forbes	Canada	37	18	24	21	29	77
27	Tulla	Jul Hansen; Larry Sobstad	United States	34	20	17	24	DSQ	73
28	Desira	Donald Birks; Harold Lankton	United States	35	24	31	22	28	70
29	Lodestar	D. Dunigan Jr. Robert Jones	United States	15	DSA	19	WDR	23	69
30	Finesse	Robert Ferguson; William Bennett	United States	16	DSA	21	DSA	21	64
31	Ariel	A. Fairhead; D. Higgins	Canada	26	DNS	DSQ	28	26	46
32	Duchess	Paul Bishop; Thomas Murray	United States	32	28	32	27	WDR	43
33	Mohawk	Meryl Amo; Ronald Sutton	United States	27	DSA	WDR	DNS	16	41
34	Seagull II	H. Day II; Thomas Nowlen	United States	38	DSA	29	31	30	40
35	Ecstasy	Sterling Potter; William Kelly	United States	33	DSA	33	32	32	38
36	Idol	W. Leirheimer; Alvin Leirheimer	United States	22	DSQ	25	DSA	DNS	36
37	Para I	R. Riethmiller; F. Runnells	United States	DSQ	26	DNS	30	35	35
38	White Shadow	William Myers; Paul Cox	United States	7	DSA	WDR	DNS	DNS	35
39	Fiammetta	Antonio Cosentino; Carlo Rolandi	Italy	24	DSA	WDR	DSA	27	33
40	Starduster	William Stout; Pennewitt	United States	36	27	WDR	DSA	DNS	21
41	Flame	R. Schluederberg; Thomas Bundy	United States	30	DSA	DNS	DNS	DNS	12

Legend: DNS – Did not start; DSA – Disabled; DSQ – Disqualified; WDR – Withdrew;
