= 1963 Star World Championship =

Event title
- Edition: 41st
- Host: Sheridan Shore Yacht Club; Chicago Yacht Club

Event details
- Venue: Chicago, United States
- Yachts: Star
- Titles: 1

Competitors
- Competitors: 134
- Competing nations: 15

Results
- (gold) Gold: (United States) Duplin & Dolan
- (silver) Silver: (United States) North & Skahill
- (bronze) Bronze: (United States) Fletcher & Colson

The 1963 Star World Championship was held in Chicago, Illinois in 1963, hosted jointly by Sheridan Shore Yacht Club and Chicago Yacht Club.

== Results ==
Results of individual races
Pos	Boat name	Crew	Country	I	II	III	IV	V	Tot
Gold medal	Star of the Sea	Joseph R. Duplin; Francis Dolan	United States	8	2	9	3	5	313
Silver medal	North Star	Lowell North; Thomas Skahill	United States	3	12	10	1	4	310
Bronze medal	Wayward Wind	Blair Fletcher; Asa L. Colson	United States	5	26	2	7	8	292
4	Glider VI	Richard Stearns; Lynn Williams	United States	6	28	1	11	13	281
5	Frolic	Bill Buchan Jr. Douglas Knight	United States	30	5	20	5	2	278
6	Gem VIII	Durward Knowles; Sloane Farrington	Bahamas	55	4	3	8	3	267
7	Chatterbox	Malin Burnham; James Reynolds	United States	1	3	8	WDR	1	259
8	Good Grief	Tom Blackaller; Alan Mitchell	United States	37	1	36	2	10	254
9	Babs	Donald Bever; William Beattie	United States	36	17	6	12	20	249
10	Ariel	Alan C. Holt; Jay Winberg	United States	29	14	30	14	11	242
11	Tranquilizer	John W. Bennett; George Conrad	United States	4	8	WDR	9	12	239
12	Caprice II	Carlo Rolandi; Alfonso Marino	Italy	16	30	12	33	19	230
13	Razor	Robert Lippincott; Walter Flynn	United States	35	20	14	19	22	230
14	Gale	Harry Gale Nye Jr. John B. Lechner	United States	20	31	13	24	25	227
15	Illusion	Paul E. Fischer; Robert Witt	West Germany	7	11	4	DSA	26	224
16	Gemini	Richard G. Hahn; Barton S. Beek	United States	10	7	40	52	9	222
17	Tsunami	Anson Beard Jr. Owen Torrey Jr.	United States	32	34	26	23	6	219
18	Desiree	Angelo Marino; Arnaldo Panico	Italy	34	21	24	29	14	218
19	Blitzkrieg	G. S. Friedrichs; Craig Nelson	United States	33	37	19	17	18	216
20	Umberta V	Luigi Croce; Luigi Saidelli	Italy	12	23	38	31	21	215
21	Heather	William Lynn; Joseph Burbeck	United States	22	24	32	16	33	213
22	Magoo	William Parks; Robert Halperin	United States	9	WDR	21	32	7	203
23	Tornado	Timir Pinegin; Fyodor Shutkov	Soviet Union	60	39	5	6	30	200
24	Siren	Eugene Corley; Edward Schnabel	United States	19	47	16	41	17	200
25	Shadow	R. M. Allan III; Bud Cassidy	United States	11	DSQ	18	15	29	199
26	Cirrus	Howard Lippincott; Robert Jenkins	United States	31	16	22	40	32	199
27	Faneca	Duarte de Almeida Bello; Fernando Bello	Portugal	52	19	25	22	23	199
28	Kutuka	Wolfgang Richer; Roberto da Rosa	Brazil	61	35	15	20	16	193
29	Shamus	E. W. Etchells; Thompson Adams	United States	46	18	DNS	4	15	189
30	Conflict	Daniel Hubers; Harvey Lekson	United States	25	41	17	25	43	189
31	Magic	Guy W. Rodgers; Robert Rodgers	United States	47	6	31	27	44	185
32	Creepy II	Foster Clarke; Robert Sweeting	Bahamas	27	40	35	28	28	182
33	Tackless	John Goddard; Paul Woodbury	United States	56	42	7	10	46	179
34	Gam	Philippe Chancerel; Michel Parent	France	40	9	43	18	57	173
35	Desiree	Herbert Hild; Edward Baumert	United States	53	38	11	13	54	171
36	Baboon	John A. Keyser; S. Boudeman	United States	24	13	55	38	47	163
37	Swingin' Star	Donald J. Trask; Donald Coleman	United States	28	56	28	26	41	161
38	Mistral	S. Provensal; Jay Egan	United States	21	27	33	48	52	159
39	Ninotchka	Peter D. Siemsen; John Erickson	Brazil	15	48	42	35	45	155
40	Ingenue	George F. Thomas; Charles Simpson	United States	59	25	41	39	31	154
41	Glisten	David Miller; Kenneth Baxter	Canada	2	15	34	DSA	DNS	153
42	Jade	John Sherwood; David Gaillard	United States	50	22	58	42	24	144
43	Chuckle	Harold Halsted; Lawence Cox	United States	39	58	27	46	27	143
44	Caprice	Owen P. Merrill; Charles Barnes	United States	51	32	37	37	40	143
45	Hawkeye	Sampson Smith; Arthur Laidlaw	United States	26	50	52	36	48	128
46	Calzoni	Jon Metzger; John S. Stewart	United States	23	45	DNF	39	38	127
47	Pasodoble	Enrique Urrutia; Juan Urrutia	Spain	13	55	WDR	49	37	118
48	Mate	Willard Hodges; James Black	United States	14	49	57	DNF	36	116
49	Widow	Alfred Greening; David Pelham	United States	17	52	48	DSA	39	116
50	Bonnie Lassie	John McKeague; Gordon McKeague	United States	63	51	23	21	WDR	114
51	Espuma del Mar	Daniel Camejo	Venezuela	48	6	51	51	42	112
52	Rampage	Roberto Sieburger; Hector Schenone	Argentina	18	29	46	DSA	DNS	111
53	Finale	Richard Miller; Gordon Hale	United States	45	10	44	DNF	DSQ	105
54	Siren III	Emil Widmer	Switzerland	58	61	39	43	35	104
55	Arakoola	H. M. Visser; Russell Gilkes	Australia	44	64	47	34	58	93
56	Tim-Log	Barr S. Morris; John Mueller	United States	43	53	WDR	50	34	92
57	Gyoshu II	T. Takebe; Sadso Yoshida	Japan	41	46	54	55	59	85
58	Patriot	J. H. Thompson; Roy Bowers	United States	54	60	53	44	49	80
59	October	Eugene T. McCarthy; C. Vandermark	United States	WDR	44	29	DSA	51	80
60	Alvo	Charles H. Dole; James Davis	United States	65	33	45	DSQ	53	76
61	Neva III	B. Mirochin; A. Semanov	Soviet Union	49	57	56	47	55	76
62	Sharen	A. Meray-Horvath; Thomas Fekete	Canada	38	43	DNF	54	DSQ	69
63	Minha Preta	Antonio de Menezes; Frank Lyon	Portugal	42	59	49	DNF	56	66
64	Cyclone III	Stewart Meding; Stephen Meding	United States	57	62	50	45	62	64
65	Tiki	Harold Lankton; Donald McMullen	United States	64	54	DSQ	53	50	51
66	Mac	Grahame Engert; Timothy Owens	Australia	62	63	DNF	DNF	61	18
67	Deuces Wild	Frank Clements; Gordon Hughes	United States	66	65	DNF	DNS	60	13

Legend: DNF – Did not finish; DNS – Did not start; DSA – Disabled; DSQ – Disqualified; WDR – Withdrew;
