= 1959 Star World Championship =

Event title
- Edition: 37th

Event details
- Venue: Newport Harbor, United States
- Yachts: Star
- Titles: 1

Competitors
- Competitors: 60
- Competing nations: 8

Results
- (gold) Gold: (United States) North & Carlile
- (silver) Silver: (United States) Comer & Hackel
- (bronze) Bronze: (United States) Ficker & Skahill

The 1959 Star World Championship was held in Newport Harbor, United States in 1959.

== Results ==
Results of individual races
Pos	Boat name	Crew	Country	I	II	III	IV	V	Tot
Gold medal	North Star III	Lowell North; Mort Carlile	United States	1	2	5	3	1	143
Silver medal	Turmoil	Gary Comer; Bill Hackel	United States	3	3	2	2	8	137
Bronze medal	Nhycusa	William P. Ficker; Thomas Skahill	United States	7	1	10	1	2	134
4	Chatterbox	Malin Burnham; Jim Reynolds	United States	2	4	4	5	12	128
5	Ma' Lindo	Mário Quina; José Quina	Portugal	6	9	1	14	11	114
6	Shandon	E. W. Etchells; Mary Etchells	United States	5	7	6	16	10	111
7	Glider	Richard Stearns; Robert Halperin	United States	12	10	7	9	13	104
8	Esprit	Jack Streeton; W. Mason Shehan	United States	11	15	13	15	4	97
9	Flame	Stan Ogilvy; Allan J. MacKay	United States	4	16	20	13	6	96
10	Frolic	Bill Buchan Jr. Roger Thompson	United States	16	DSQ	8	4	3	93
11	Magic	Roy Rodgers; Robert Rodgers	United States	8	8	22	19	5	93
12	Merope	Agostino Straulino; Carlo Rolandi	Italy	9	17	3	17	19	90
13	Pimm	Walter von Hütschler; Jorge Camaro	Brazil	20	5	12	7	25	86
14	Esquire	Richard G. Hahn; Charles Lewsadder	United States	10	19	14	20	9	83
15	Siren	Eugene Corley; John Dienhart	United States	14	21	23	11	7	79
16	Lindova	Charles W. Lyon Jr. Frank Lyon	United States	19	11	21	10	17	77
17	De Wolf	Frank Rollins; Rob't Matthews	United States	23	20	15	6	15	76
18	Gem IV	Durward Knowles; Robert Levin	Bahamas	15	14	11	18	22	75
19	Urchin	Joseph Killeen; Harold Sporl	United States	22	23	18	12	22	66
20	Kurush IV	Alvaro de Cárdenas; Carlos de Cárdenas	Cuba	26	6	9	24	24	66
21	Which Star II	Allen Mitchell; Emery Mitchell	United States	13	13	17	DSQ	16	65
22	Circus	Howard Lippincott; Don K. Edler	United States	18	18	16	DSQ	18	54
23	Creepy II	Foster Clarke; Charles Munro	Bahamas	24	12	19	26	20	54
24	Water Witch	Charles H. Dole; Thomas Boland	United States	21	27	28	8	23	48
25	Good Grief	Tom Blackaller; Mark Yorston	United States	17	WDR	DSQ	21	21	34
26	Fascination	W. J. Froome; W. R. Lowrey	United States	29	22	26	22	27	29
27	Hokunani	Harry C. Uhler; Cy Gillette	United States	27	24	24	25	28	27
28	Conflict	Daniel Hubers; A. J. Mullan	United States	25	25	25	23	30	27
29	Scram	Ken Kirkland; Ian Kirkland	Canada	28	26	29	27	26	19
30	Kathleen	Roberto Mieres; Jorge Brown	Argentina	DNF	28	27	28	28	12

Legend: DNF – Did not finish; DSA – Disabled; DSQ – Disqualified; WDR – Withdrew;
