= 1988 Star World Championships =

The 1988 Star World Championships were held in Buenos Aires, Argentina January 19–31, 1988.

== Results ==
Results of individual races
Pos	Crew	Country	I	II	III	IV	V	VI	Pts
Gold medal	Paul Cayard (H); Steve Erickson	United States	4	3	1	3	7	DNS	21.0
Silver medal	Mark Reynolds (H); Hal Haenel	United States	10	2	9	2	1	9	36.0
Bronze medal	Ed Adams (H); Tom Olsen	United States	5	7	45	4	3	3	42.4
4	Alexander Hagen (H); Fritz Girr	West Germany	1	8	8	7	9	2	44.0
5	Torben Grael (H); Nelson Falcão	Brazil	11	6	4	5	14	6	58.4
6	Vicente Brun (H); Hugo Schreiner	United States	2	13	11	9	11	10	70.0
7	Giorgio Gorla (H); Alfio Peraboni	Italy	12	9	17	13	2	14	75.0
8	Joachim Hellmich (H); Dirk Schaertzel	West Germany	3	16	35	10	8	39	78.7
9	Roberto Ferrarese (H); Carlo Girone	Italy	13	24	2	DNF	23	1	81.0
10	Mats Johansson (H); Mats Hansson	Sweden	8	14	13	9	10	13	81.0
11	Joachim Griese (H); Michael Marcour	West Germany	16	3	22	11	6	25	84.4
12	Albino Fravezzi (H); N. Menoni	Italy	15	18	28	3	4	24	88.7
13	Alberto Zanetti (H); J. Labandeira	Argentina	6	4	16	DNF	15	5	92.7
14	Hans Wallén (H); Bengt Andersson	Sweden	24	12	3	18	12	DNF	95.7
15	Steven Bakker (H); Kobus Vandenberg	Netherlands	29	5	12	12	16	22	96.0
16	Ross MacDonald (H); Bruce MacDonald	Canada	7	21	29	16	32	4	105.0
17	Gastão Brun (H); Alberto Guarischi	Brazil	23	33	14	23	20	35	111.0
19	J. A. MacCausland (H); Robert MacCausland	United States	18	22	24	27	19	7	117.0
20	Anders Geert Jensen (H); Mogens Just Mikkelsen	Denmark	27	31	7	17	25	11	117.0
21	P. Fricker (H); Carlos Rittscher	Switzerland	9	17	27	19	28	DNF	130.0
22	Ingvar Bengtson (H); Peter Klock	Sweden	19	15	35	26	11	36	136.0
23	Juan Costas (H); Jose Perez	Spain	40	19	30	6	15	40	139.7
24	T. Herrmann (H); Rick Hennig	United States	31	35	23	14	33	26	149.0
25	Eduardo Farre (H); C. Gabutti	Argentina	30	23	36	31	21	19	154.0
26	Pedro Bulhoes (H); D. Riper	Brazil	22	34	25	YMP	DNF	20	156.3
27	Anders Myralf (H); Stefan Myralf	Denmark	PMS	10	10	DNF	30	8	157.0
28	Barton S. Beek (H); Chuck Beek	United States	23	43	19	33	27	36	160.0
29	Peter Sundelin (H); Stephan Kallin	Sweden	35	35	59	29	5	32	165.0
30	Joe Londrigan (H); M. Busch	United States	14	DNF	20	15	DNF	18	166.0
31	Josef Steinmayer (H); T. Lussi	Switzerland	37	36	26	27	31	17	167.0
32	Marco Aurelio Paradeda (H); Manfredo Floricke	Brazil	45	29	42	37	37	36	173.0
33	M. van Leeuwen (H); P. Vollebregt	Netherlands	PMS	20	46	36	24	23	179.0
34	John King (H); Fernando Nabuco	Brazil	38	30	38	24	26	36	183.0
36	Stephen G. Gould (H); J. Kew	United States	44	32	18	28	42	DNF	194.0
36	Johan Schröder (H); Stefan Sundquist	Sweden	20	27	DNF	14	DNF	21	201.0
37	Mauro Testa (H); Gianni Testa	Italy	41	13	21	41	37	DNF	203.0
38	C. Sheinecker (H); Peter Moeckl	Austria	46	28	40	25	YMP	DNS	203.8
39	Ingvar J:son Krook (H); C. Bobeck	Sweden	28	50	34	45	36	38	213.0
40	C. Gautschi (H); N. Kottmann	West Germany	36	41	54	32	34	43	216.0
41	J. Fauroux (H); P. Rinaldi	France	48	44	31	42	29	41	217.0
42	Rainer Roellenbleg (H); Robert Stark	West Germany	43	37	DNF	35	45	29	219.0
43	J. Percossi (H); P. Homps	Argentina	26	46	52	38	50	31	221.0
44	Kim Fletcher (H); C. Lewsadder	United States	DNF	40	43	43	39	27	222.0
45	S. P. Mykkänen (H); C. Olsson	Finland	47	38	47	30	40	37	222.0
46	M. Pajot (H); S. Poughon	France	34	DSQ	39	40	22	30	224.0
47	J. Vuithier (H); C. Hayner	Switzerland	39	48	32	DNF	44	33	226.0
48	Agost. Randazzo (H); F. Bertorotta	Italy	42	45	6	DNF	43	DNF	234.7
49	John Foster, Sr (H); John Foster Jr.	U.S. Virgin Islands	51	42	37	39	47	42	237.0
50	Eduardo de Souza (H); P. Nolte	Brazil	32	DNS	48	22	41	DNS	242.0
51	Joe Bainton (H); E. Dreiband	United States	49	47	58	46	36	34	242.0
52	Gui. Calegari (H); G. Silva	Argentina	25	61	49	DNF	DSQ	13	247.0
53	Antonio Roquette (H); N. MacPherson	Portugal	33	39	33	DNF	DNS	DNS	273.0
54	C. Dubini (H); C. Picazo	Argentina	DNF	56	44	47	49	49	275.0
55	Mario Caprile (H); Guido Sodano	Spain	53	53	57	49	51	47	283.0
56	Hans Prechter (H); C. Neumeier	West Germany	57	51	51	55	55	45	287.0
57	W. Werner Dohnert (H); A. R. Bastos	Brazil	52	55	53	51	56	46	287.0
58	Dierk Thomsen (H); I. Saenz	West Germany	56	52	50	48	52	DNF	288.0
59	D. Ziegelmeier (H); W. Kersten	West Germany	58	57	41	54	RET	51	293.0
60	Ulrich Fischer (H); Rudolf Dahnk	West Germany	YMP	54	62	56	57	48	298.0
61	Patrick Londrigan (H); Tom Londrigan	United States	61	63	55	DNF	48	44	301.0
62	G. Friesacher (H); Hary Mitterdorfer	Austria	DNF	59	63	50	46	53	301.0
63	Reiner Haase (H); W. Beuel	Netherlands	50	49	64	44	DNF	DNF	306.0
64	C. Balestra (H); N. Imhof	Switzerland	55	60	61	DNF	53	50	309.0
65	Harry W. Walker (H); M. Lucca	United States	59	62	60	53	54	DNS	318.0
66	C. Reckmann (H); C. Kapolla	Switzerland	60	DNF	56	52	DNF	52	319.0
67	Gerry Cayne (H); P. Dufaur	United States	62	64	65	57	59	54	326.0
68	R. Zuezola (H); Ovidio Lagos	Argentina	54	58	DSQ	YMP	58	DNS	328.8
69	William Parks (H); C. Arensen	United States	DNS	DNS	DNS	DNS	DNS	DNS	375.0
70	Michael Clements (H); Robert Burton	Canada	DNS	DNS	DNS	DNS	DNS	DNS	375.0

Legend: DNF – Did not finish; DNS – Did not start; DSQ – Disqualified; PMS – Premature start; RET – Retired; YMP – Yacht materially prejudiced;
