= 1985 Star World Championships =

Event title
- Edition: 62nd

Event details
- Venue: Nassau, Bahamas
- Titles: 1

Competitors
- Competitors: 160
- Competing nations: 13

Results
- (gold) Gold: (United States) Buchan & Erickson
- (silver) Silver: (Netherlands) Bakker & Vandenberg
- (bronze) Bronze: (United States) Cayard & Keefe

The 1985 Star World Championships were held in Nassau, Bahamas in 1985.

== Results ==
Results of individual races
Pos	Crew	Country	I	II	III	IV	V	VI	Pts
Gold medal	Bill Buchan Jr. (H); Steve Erickson	United States	2	6	2	DNF	5	2	30.7
Silver medal	Steven Bakker (H); Kobus Vandenberg	Netherlands	5	8	3	3	2	14	38.4
Bronze medal	Paul Cayard (H); Kenneth Keefe	United States	1	1	14	6	6	11	40.4
4	Augie Diaz (H); Marshall Duane	United States	3	2	11	15	7	5	48.7
5	Werner Fritz (H); Vincent Hösch	West Germany	10	5	4	11	14	3	56.7
6	Giorgio Gorla (H); Alfio Peraboni	Italy	18	3	7	12	DSQ	1	60.7
7	Albino Fravezzi (H); Oscar Dalvit	Italy	20	15	5	24	1	6	68.7
8	Andrew Menkart (H); G. Dolan	United States	16	17	30	1	4	13	72
9	Alan Adler (H); Christoph Bergmann	Brazil	19	13	8	8	8	8	75
10	Peter Wright (H); Terry Bowman	United States	6	10	16	25	12	12	85.7
11	Ed Adams (H); Tom Olsen	United States	9	9	10	13	16	DNF	87
12	Peter Sundelin (H); Stephan Kallin	Sweden	14	7	6	18	26	15	89.7
13	Hubert Raudaschl (H); Andreas Denk	Austria	12	14	22	9	9	33	107
14	Joachim Griese (H); Michael Marcour	West Germany	15	11	19	5	30	29	108
15	Alexander Hagen (H); Matthias Borowy	West Germany	8	DNF	9	10	33	23	113
16	Josef Steinmayer (H); Reto Heilig	Switzerland	36	27	1	35	24	9	119
17	Vicente Brun (H); Bob Billingham	United States	4	DNS	40	4	27	20	121
18	Kent Carlsson (H); Fredrik Lindblad	Sweden	33	12	23	20	20	19	124
19	Mark Reynolds (H); Hugo Schreiner	United States	DSQ	DNF	17	2	3	7	131.7
20	Steve Kelly (H); Myles Pritchard	Bahamas	25	22	43	14	11	30	132
21	Roberto Benamati (H); Giuseppe Devoti	Italy	35	25	24	7	15	43	136
22	John Dane III (H); Frederick May	United States	30	DNF	48	19	13	4	142
23	Eduardo de Souza (H); Robert Rittscher	Brazil	23	40	12	31	35	18	149
24	Larry Whipple (H); Kirk Utter	United States	44	18	36	33	17	16	150
25	Ross MacDonald (H); Bruce MacDonald	Canada	28	37	DNF	23	19	17	154
26	Peter Ficker (H); Sergio Nascimento	Brazil	26	20	29	21	38	32	158
27	Ted Hovey (H); Neil Foley	United States	21	24	60	16	40	28	159
28	Peter Scheel (H); J. C. da Silva Jordao	Brazil	17	16	34	42	22	57	161
29	Cattaneo Adorno (H); Daniel Wilcox	Brazil	31	31	18	32	24	35	167
30	Jens-Peter Wrede (H); Ulrich Seeberger	West Germany	11	4	DSQ	22	DSQ	25	171
31	Alberto Zanetti (H); Eduardo Farré	Argentina	7	30	64	29	39	37	172
32	Stephen G. Gould (H); William Keller	United States	29	19	56	58	18	22	174
33	Mats Johansson (H); Bengt Bengtsson	Sweden	43	26	26	26	60	27	178
34	Hans Vogt Jr. (H); Thomas Buedel	West Germany	24	DNF	28	45	41	10	179
35	Argyle Campbell (H); Jay Butler	United States	39	28	27	DNF	28	31	183
36	Wilhelm Kuhweide (H); Felix Meier	Switzerland	40	21	44	27	23	47	185
37	M. Chr. Scheinecker (H); Christian Holler	Austria	13	DNF	15	36	44	52	190
38	Michael Clements (H); Robert Burton	Canada	38	45	YMP	17	31	51	193.8
39	John Ulbrich (H); Chris Rogers	United States	27	32	67	28	32	46	195
40	Joachim Hellmich (H); Andreas Gerlach	West Germany	37	29	20	40	45	42	198
41	Uwe von Below (H); Franz Wehofsich	West Germany	22	34	22	49	41	DSQ	198
42	Colin Bate (H); Grant Crowle	Australia	42	33	25	48	50	24	202
43	Rob Maine III (H); Richard Rundle	United States	DNF	35	31	39	47	48	230
44	William Parks (H); Reid Krakower	United States	50	38	39	44	34	DNS	235
45	Eugene McCarthy (H); Glenn McCarthy	United States	59	46	72	50	29	26	240
46	Anthony Herrmann (H); Mark Herrmann	United States	49	50	21	62	37	53	240
47	Gary MacDonald (H); David Winkler	United States	32	41	YMP	53	55	45	243.8
48	Larry Suter (H); Todd C. Raynor	United States	55	47	38	YMP	DNF	44	260
49	Gui. Calegari (H); Miguel Costa	Argentina	45	43	62	38	49	55	260
50	Pedro Bulhoes (H); Rodrigo Meirelles	Brazil	54	52	45	34	48	54	263
51	Sune Carlsson (H); Stellan Westerdahl	Sweden	47	DNF	63	37	46	40	263
52	Ingvar Bengtson (H); Gunnar Dahl	Sweden	DNF	DNF	13	30	56	56	266
53	Joe Londrigan (H); Tom Londrigan	United States	53	44	DNF	54	54	39	274
54	Durward Knowles (H); J. Woodside	Bahamas	41	DNF	32	52	DNF	41	277
55	Hans Wallén (H); Bengt Andersson	Sweden	DSQ	23	41	DNF	53	49	277
56	Heinz Nixdorf (H); Gerhard Borowy	West Germany	70	39	47	DSQ	58	34	278
57	Dierk Thomsen (H); Axel Reuter	West Germany	61	58	37	46	52	58	281
58	Bruno Marazzi (H); Ueli Keller	Switzerland	46	DSQ	68	59	43	38	284
59	Lee Kellerhouse (H); William Bridge	United States	57	56	66	56	36	50	285
60	Joe Bainton (H); R. Pepiak	United States	60	51	42	43	66	65	291
61	Detlef Kuke (H); Stephan Wagner	West Germany	65	60	46	47	51	DNF	299
62	Peter D. Siemsen (H); L. A. C. Veiga	Brazil	71	53	50	51	59	61	304
63	J. M. MacCausland (H); Jay Tyson	United States	64	42	55	61	57	DNF	306
64	Hank Rowan (H); Jack Fitts	United States	DNF	54	59	41	65	67	316
65	Joseph Roberts (H); Joseph A. Roberts	United States	DNF	57	57	57	61	60	332
66	Steve Kling (H); Alan Drew	United States	48	DNF	49	68	64	66	325
67	Peter Gale (H); Ernie Lawrence	Australia	51	48	35	DNF	DNS	DNS	326
68	Frank E. Raymond (H); Daniel T. Lencioni	United States	62	DNF	58	64	DNF	36	331
69	Daniel Adler (H); Alberto Guarischi	Brazil	34	36	DNS	DNF	DNF	DNF	343
70	Thorn Cook (H); William Nigey	United States	58	DNF	51	DSQ	67	63	350
71	Peter Stockmayr (H); Peter Greiner	West Germany	66	61	69	69	63	62	351
72	Dave Williford (H); Steve O'Connell	United States	DNF	59	DSQ	60	62	59	351
73	John Chiarella (H); Robert Cook	United States	63	62	71	70	68	64	357
74	Richard Burgess (H); John Wulff	United States	69	55	62	66	DNF	DNF	363
75	Harry W. Walker (H); David Dickey	United States	72	DNF	61	67	70	69	369
76	Bernardo Silva (H); Jorge Goncalves	Portugal	68	DNF	65	63	69	DNS	376
77	John W. Allen (H); John Ahlquist	United States	67	DNS	70	65	DNF	68	381
78	Rod Montster (H); Rolf Heinecke	Canada	56	DNF	53	DNF	DNS	DNS	382
79	Timothy A. Owens (H); Alan Hudson	Australia	52	DNS	DNF	DNF	DNS	DNS	406
80	Rainer Roellenbleg (H); Fritz Girr	West Germany	DNS	DNF	54	DNF	DNS	DNS	408

Legend: DNF – Did not finish; DNS – Did not start; DSQ – Disqualified; YMP – Yacht materially prejudiced;
