= 1970 Star World Championship =

1970 Star World Championships
Event title
- Edition: 47th

Event details
- Venue: Marstrand, Sweden
- Dates: 1970
- Yachts: Star

Competitors
- Competitors: 106
- Competing nations: 10

Results
- (gold) Gold: (United States) Buchan & Sutter
- (silver) Silver: (United States) Schoonmaker & Åkerson
- (bronze) Bronze: (Sweden) Wennerström & Christensson

The 1970 Star World Championship was held in Marstrand, Sweden in 1970.

== Results ==
Results of individual races
Pos	Boat name	Crew	Country	I	II	III	IV	V	Tot
Gold medal	Frolic	Bill Buchan Jr. Carl F. Sutter	United States	5	1	7	1	1	250
Silver medal	Dingo	Ding Schoonmaker; Arne Åkerson	United States	1	6	2	9	5	242
Bronze medal	Blott X	Stig Wennerström; Sture Christensson	Sweden	2	8	8	7	6	234
4	D. H. Growler	Barton S. Beek; Charles Beek	United States	16	4	6	10	11	218
5	Swingin' Star	Donald J. Trask; William Kreysler	United States	8	19	5	21	7	205
6	Nokturn	Vladimir Vasilyev; Sergeyev	Soviet Union	4	10	25	14	9	203
7	Swift	Tom Blackaller; Gary Mull	United States	DSA	3	1	4	3	201
8	Something Else	Lowell North; Peter Barrett	United States	DSA	2	12	3	2	193
9	Da Capo IX	Lars-Erik Molse; Hansson	Sweden	20	16	11	19	8	191
10	Buho Blanco	Jörg Bruder; Thomas Lundqvist	Brazil	3	11	4	8	WDR	186
11	Tornado	Boris Budnikov; V. Zanotayhn	Soviet Union	11	40	9	6	14	185
12	Subbnboana	Eckart Wagner; Peter Möckl	West Germany	9	18	16	22	17	183
13	Humbug VII	Pelle Petterson; Stellan Westerdahl	Sweden	DSA	17	3	12	4	176
14	Mystere	Edwin Bernet; Rolf Amrein	Switzerland	7	29	20	18	22	169
15	Pussy Cat	Robert Blattmann; Hans Wohnlich	Switzerland	17	9	36	15	20	168
16	Glider	Richard Stearns; Lynn Williams	United States	6	30	33	13	19	164
17	Jackpot V	Stefan Winberg; Leif Johansson	Sweden	14	14	22	28	24	163
18	Monique	K. A. Rydquist; Lars Andersson	Sweden	12	36	13	32	10	162
19	Humbug X	Peter Tallberg; Henrik Tallberg	Finland	13	37	14	11	29	161
20	Courage	Bengt Hellsten; Per-Olof Melin	Sweden	18	31	27	16	16	157
21	Krangel	John Albrechtson; U. Blenkce	Sweden	29	WDR	10	2	21	150
22	Giosi V	Luigi Croce; Luigi Saideili	Italy	24	24	30	20	18	149
23	Noncents Too	Kim Fletcher; James Reynolds	United States	34	32	31	5	15	148
24	Flying Star VII	Lars Berg; Dag Blidbäck	Sweden	21	23	23	17	34	147
25	Tappalatta III	Bertil Steninad; Kenneth Kimhed	Sweden	23	21	21	31	23	146
26	Dorrit VIII	Esbjörn Bruske; Bengt Malmiand	Sweden	10	25	28	36	21	139
27	Fjord Star	G. Mejlaender; Johan Mejlaender	United States	27	13	26	34	38	127
28	Fair Lady	Hannes Schwarz; Hainz Loichinger	West Germany	28	15	40	30	36	116
29	Liz	Flavio Scala; Mario Testa	Italy	15	52	DNF	27	13	115
30	Mari	Sune Carlsson; Bo Wickström	Sweden	DSA	5	17	24	DNS	113
31	Blue Moon	Börje Larsson; Göran Tell	Sweden	19	12	19	DNF	DNS	109
32	Los Angeles	Klaus Kappes; Helmut Kassner	West Germany	DSA	38	15	25	26	108
33	Lausbub IV	Martin Schwieer; Will von Below	West Germany	DSA	20	35	38	12	107
34	Lucky Liz	Fritz Riess; Erich Niedsballa	West Germany	DSA	7	24	23	DNS	105
35	Nadia	Jurg Christen; W. Giesbrecht	Switzerland	25	39	38	26	32	105
36	Witchcraft	Peter Wilson; Kent D. Edler	United States	32	DNF	18	33	25	104
37	Duell	Mats Lilja; Peter Lilja	Sweden	22	DNF	34	29	30	97
38	Bavaria	S. Scheuregger; Hans H. Geim	West Germany	30	35	37	41	33	89
39	Penelope	Peter Wyss; Rolf Wyss	Switzerland	26	43	29	43	35	89
40	Gipsy	Juerg Schmid; Marc Christen	Switzerland	DNF	22	43	35	31	81
41	Toucas	Jose Q. Saldanha; Joao M. Tito	Portugal	31	34	42	42	39	77
42	Bounty II	Mario Inneco; Borges	Brazil	DNF	27	32	DNF	28	72
43	Skum	Sven Lundevall; Carl Nordenberg	Sweden	DNF	41	39	39	37	56
44	Avolfore II	Fabrizio Serena; Ottavio Serena	Italy	DNF	26	41	37	DNS	55
45	Sverige	Larry Shaper; Lester Lefkowitz	United States	DNF	33	44	44	41	50
46	Elgon	Luis Roboredo; Tito Roboredo	Portugal	33	28	DNF	DNS	DNS	45
47	Tucana VIII	Dierk Thomsen; Gard Marshke	West Germany	DNF	44	DNF	40	40	35
48	Dolphin II	Rudolf Lange; Helmut Besler	Austria	–	45	–	–	–	8
49	Strupp III	Kurt Zwickl; Peter Luschan	Austria	DNF	–	–	–	–	0
50	Sirene	Marino Barendson; G. Dahl	Italy	DNF	–	DNF	–	–	0
51	Desire V	Angelo Marino; Antonio Bottini	Italy	DNF	DNF	DNF	–	–	0
52	Firefly	R. Firestone; Carlsson	United States	DNF	–	DNF	–	–	0
53	Zwentebold	Rudi Berchtold; Hugo F. Schott	West Germany	DNF	–	DNF	–	–	0

Legend: DNF – Did not finish; DNS – Did not start; DSA – Disabled; WDR – Withdrew;
