= 1983 Star World Championships =

The 1983 Star World Championships were held in Marina del Rey, United States August 9–21, 1983. The hosting yacht club was California Yacht Club.

== Results ==
Results of individual races
Pos	Crew	Country	I	II	III	IV	V	VI	Pts
Gold medal	Antonio Gorostegui (H); José Doreste	Spain	2	PMS	2	4	2	10	33
Silver medal	Joachim Griese (H); Michael Marcour	West Germany	16	20	1	1	1	RET	48
Bronze medal	Bill Buchan, Jr. (H); Carl Buchan	United States	20	7	3	5	14	2	51.7
4	Vicente Brun (H); Hugo Schreiner	United States	1	27	7	26	6	8	70.7
5	Uwe von Below (H); Franz Wehofsich	West Germany	3	9	13	20	YMP	36	82.1
6	John Dane III (H); Frederick May	United States	6	2	15	33	33	13	93.7
7	Alexander Hagen (H); Vincent Hoesch	West Germany	9	PMS	32	6	7	11	94.7
8	Hubert Raudaschl (H); Karl Ferstl	Austria	45	5	52	12	10	1	95
9	Gastão Brun (H); Daniel Wilcox	Brazil	24	23	5	13	12	14	96
10	Olle Johansson (H); Dag Hansson	Sweden	11	8	23	PMS	4	26	100
11	Augie Diaz (H); Frank Egger	United States	4	25	16	9	22	29	104
12	Peter Sundelin (H); Roger Nilsson	Sweden	12	50	4	29	30	6	108.7
13	Colin Bate (H); Phil Baker	Australia	22	18	18	10	29	12	110
14	Allan Leibel (H); Corey Leibel	Canada	PMS	4	19	30	41	7	129
15	Tom Löfstedt (H); Martin Alsen	Sweden	PMS	6	22	18	32	23	130.7
16	Dennis Clark (H); Eric Kownacki	United States	19	3	31	31	40	21	131.7
17	Bruno Marazzi (H); Ueli Keller	Switzerland	43	11	6	60	36	9	134.7
18	Tryg Liljestrand (H); Christopher Gould	United States	36	38	29	28	8	5	135
19	Mark Reynolds (H); Steve Erickson	United States	27	28	21	27	15	17	137
20	Ilias Khatzipavlis (H); Michalis Mitakis	Greece	14	37	24	22	11	DNF	138
21	Ben Mitchell (H); Ken Young	United States	15	21	42	39	18	18	141
22	Shawn Killeen (H); Beau le Blanc	United States	5	24	38	DNF	31	16	143
23	J. A. MacCausland (H); Jay Brown	United States	28	36	30	7	24	25	150
24	Poul Richard Høj Jensen (H); Palle Steen Larsen	Denmark	PMS	34	37	16	16	19	152
25	Ian Woolward (H); John Maddocks	United States	25	43	35	21	21	22	154
26	Jochen Schwarz (H); Peter Moeckl	West Germany	7	55	51	35	5	28	155
27	Thomas Lundqvist (H); Lars Unger	Sweden	33	PMS	8	44	17	24	156
28	Giorgio Gorla (H); Alfio Peraboni	Italy	23	PMS	46	3	13	47	158.7
29	Barton S. Beek (H); Charles Beek	United States	8	17	25	41	43	40	161
30	John Boyce (H); David Munge	Great Britain	54	13	53	14	20	33	163
31	Andrew Menkart (H); James Kavle	United States	30	15	68	23	27	41	166
32	Boudewijn Binkhorst (H); Willem van Walt-Meyer	Netherlands	PMS	32	34	2	3	DNF	171.7
33	David Howlett (H); Timothy Tavinor	Great Britain	46	45	12	PMS	25	15	173
34	Stig Wennerström (H); Bengt Andersson	Sweden	40	10	28	34	35	38	175
35	Rainer Roellenbleg (H); Ulrich Seeberger	West Germany	29	47	14	24	DNF	35	179
36	Josef Steinmayer (H); Reto Heilig	Switzerland	34	14	61	25	34	44	181
37	Mats Johansson (H); Bengt Bengtsson	Sweden	44	29	20	32	28	DNS	181
38	Gio. Cassinari (H); Oscar Dalvit	Italy	21	19	66	DNF	50	3	185.7
39	Jens-Peter Wrede (H); Matthias Borowy	West Germany	PMS	22	11	17	DNF	31	190
40	Larry Whipple (H); Foss Miller	United States	PMS	PMS	10	8	44	20	191
41	William Gerard (H); Randy MacLaren	United States	55	PMS	27	19	38	30	199
42	Pelle Petterson (H); Ulf Schröder	Sweden	39	57	30	43	19	45	206
43	William Parks (H); David Cornes	United States	48	1	48	53	54	DNS	227
44	James M. Schoonmaker (H); Chris Rogers	United States	32	PMS	39	11	39	PMS	230
45	Thompson Adams (H); Ross Adams	United States	PMS	39	59	51	51	4	232
46	Ludwig Buedel (H); Werner Fritz	West Germany	31	46	36	47	45	DNS	235
47	Schröder (H); Gunther Haack	Sweden	PMS	12	26	46	48	PMS	241
48	Agost. Randazzo (H); Alessandro la Lomia	Italy	60	16	41	49	46	DNF	242
49	Timothy A. Owens (H); T. J. Carruthers	Australia	38	PMS	43	45	47	42	245
50	John Polglase (H); Geoffrey Crampton	Canada	18	49	60	DSQ	55	37	249
51	Paul Davis (H); Phillip Bissell	Canada	44	31	70	52	23	DNS	250
52	Patrick de Barros (H); Felipe V. da Rocha	Portugal	41	51	72	48	58	32	260
53	Kenneth Palmgren (H); Timo Lampen	Finland	10	48	56	PMS	42	DNS	265
54	Chuck Lewsadder (H); Kim Fletcher	United States	57	44	67	50	49	43	273
55	M. Chr. Scheinecker (H); Thomas Richer	Austria	PMS	PMS	64	36	26	39	274
56	Peter D. Siemsen (H); Marcus Temke	Brazil	59	53	40	56	37	DNS	275
57	Eduardo Farre (H); Juan Solar	Argentina	50	61	47	40	52	DNS	280
58	Dierk Thomsen (H); Gert Schulte	West Germany	47	41	75	54	59	49	280
59	Jens Christensen (H); Lars Kier	Denmark	PMS	ret	57	PMS	9	27	281
60	Carroll Beek (H); Joseph Beek	United States	49	35	69	57	61	50	282
61	Peter Scheel (H); Carlos Rittscher	Brazil	PMS	26	17	PMS	56	DNS	287
62	Chas. Corbishley (H); Kevin Murphy	United States	37	42	62	38	DNF	DNS	288
63	Harry W. Walker (H); Bo Svenson	United States	58	33	73	62	60	48	291
64	Kees Douze (H); Willem Nagel	Netherlands	DSQ	56	33	15	DNF	DNS	292
65	Duarte Bello (H); Rui Roque de Pinho	Portugal	52	52	63	58	57	46	295
66	Heinz Nixdorf (H); Josef Pieper	West Germany	17	40	54	DNF	DNF	DNS	299
67	Buddy Melges (H); Lance Puccio	United States	26	PMS	9	DNS	DNS	DNS	302
68	Gary Mawson (H); Witold Gesing	Canada	13	54	49	DNS	DNS	DNS	304
69	J. M. MacCausland (H); Robert MacCausland	United States	35	PMS	74	37	53	DNS	308
70	S. Westerdahl (H); Bengt Hellsten	Sweden	56	58	44	42	DNF	DNS	309
71	Gerd Hanelt (H); Charles Saylan	West Germany	53	60	76	61	62	51	317
72	Stephen G. Gould (H); John Mann	United States	DNF	PMS	55	55	DNF	34	332
73	Paul Henderson (H); Dennis Totms	Canada	PMS	30	45	DNS	DNS	DNS	342
74	Hans Bucha (H); Fred Simmons	United States	61	59	77	63	63	DNF	353
75	Eugene E. Corley (H); James Lyman	United States	DNF	62	65	59	DNF	DNS	374
76	Durward Knowles (H); Michael Russell	Bahamas	51	PMS	71	DNS	DNS	DNS	389
77	Joe Londrigan (H); Tom Londrigan	United States	PMS	PMS	58	DNF	DNF	DNS	404
78	F. N. De Abreu (H); Camilo Carvalho	Brazil	DNF	DNF	DNS	DNS	DNS	DNS	425

Legend: DNF – Did not finish; DNS – Did not start; DSQ – Disqualified; PMS – Premature start; RET – Retired; YMP – Yacht materially prejudiced;
