= 1986 Star World Championships =

The 1986 Star World Championships were held on Capri, Italy in 1986.

== Results ==
Results of individual races
Pos	Crew	Country	I	II	III	IV	V	VI	Pts
Gold medal	Vicente Brun (H); Hugo Schreiner	United States	1	13	1	1	5	23	29
Silver medal	Giuseppe Milone (H); Roberto Mottola	Italy	53	10	2	3	1	33	63.7
Bronze medal	Ed Adams (H); Tom Olsen	United States	16	11	10	47	6	7	79.7
4	Alan Adler (H); Christoph Bergmann	Brazil	14	8	36	10	30	5	96
5	Albino Fravezzi (H); Oscar Dalvit	Italy	3	3	30	11	37	27	97.4
6	Joachim Griese (H); Michael Marcour	West Germany	9	30	48	2	34	3	99.7
7	Mats Johansson (H); Mats Hansson	Sweden	10	1	13	31	43	26	104
8	Roberto Benamati (H); Giuseppe Devoti	Italy	25	4	DSQ	8	26	15	106
9	Roberto Ferrarese (H); Carlo Girone	Italy	31	18	5	22	32	4	107
10	Kim Fletcher (H); William Kreysler	United States	2	48	12	9	12	64	108
11	Vince Locatelli (H); Daniele Bresciano	Italy	52	7	22	4	35	12	108
12	Werner Fritz (H); Vincent Hoesch	West Germany	22	2	45	18	36	9	112
13	Alexander Hagen (H); Matthias Borowy	West Germany	6	6	43	16	20	39	116.4
14	Steven Bakker (H); Kobus Vandenberg	Netherlands	20	38	6	26	2	PMS	116.7
15	Kent Carlsson (H); Leif Möller	Sweden	12	9	47	50	13	16	127
16	Claudio Biekarck (H); Peter Erzberger	Brazil	38	16	27	7	14	38	132
17	Hubert Raudaschl (H); Franz Kloiber	Austria	24	14	25	30	57	11	134
18	Eduardo de Souza (H); Robert Rittscher	Brazil	28	15	28	41	4	34	137
19	John Ulbrich (H); Marshall Duane	United States	17	36	14	19	59	22	138
20	Anders Myralf (H); Stefan Myralf	Denmark	35	23	11	6	39	DNF	143.7
21	Pedro Bulhoes (H); Carlos McCourtney	Brazil	27	29	DNF	32	7	19	144
22	Mark Reynolds (H); Hal Haenel	United States	4	PMS	32	24	42	20	150
23	Gastão Brun (H); Rodrigo Meirelles	Brazil	32	20	38	23	16	41	159
24	M. Chr. Scheinecker (H); Christian Holler	Austria	37	17	3	35	51	43	161.7
25	Joachim Hellmich (H); Andreas Gerlach	West Germany	33	53	8	13	69	28	165
26	Rich Hammarvid (H); Stefan Nordstrom	Sweden	7	26	63	68	10	30	166
27	Uwe von Below (H); Franz Wehofsich	West Germany	60	22	24	25	28	51	180
28	Manfred Meyer (H); Peter Kullmann	West Germany	36	47	23	33	19	DNF	188
29	Anders Geert Jensen (H); Mogens Just Mikkelsen	Denmark	47	DNF	62	20	18	13	190
30	Andrew Menkart (H); Greg Dolan	United States	15	DNF	59	70	3	24	197.7
31	Rorbert Virgin (H); Magnus Liljedahl	United States	67	81	19	66	15	6	191
32	Ross MacDonald (H); Bruce MacDonald	Canada	46	25	42	17	40	59	200
33	Giorgio Gorla (H); Alfio Peraboni	Italy	51	45	17	51	65	8	202
34	Jochen Schwarz (H); Dieter Wuerdig	West Germany	30	43	39	55	8	62	205
35	Agost. Randazzo (H); Valerio Romano	Italy	40	41	49	14	54	31	205
36	Olle Johansson (H); Dan Anders Carlsson	Sweden	19	58	52	29	70	17	205
37	Barton S. Beek (H); Val Lyon	United States	11	33	34	65	38	61	207
38	Antonio Roquette (H); Luis Manso	Portugal	23	35	53	58	23	46	210
39	Juan Costas (H); Jose Perez	Spain	48	34	18	36	47	57	213
40	G. Feichtinger (H); Hary Mitterdorfer	Bahamas	42	31	26	40	50	PMS	219
41	William Parks (H); David Cornes	United States	73	54	4	25	74	50	224
42	Rainer Roellenbleg (H); Fritz Girr	West Germany	39	5	37	69	64	52	226
43	Per Baagoe (H); Peter Brogger	Denmark	41	55	35	75	DSQ	1	230
44	Ingvar Bengtson (H); Peter Klock	Sweden	72	PMS	9	12	84	25	232
45	Franco Nazzaro (H); Francesco Ceribelli	Italy	66	65	15	21	79	37	234
46	Guido Falciola (H); Marco Pizio	Italy	89	56	33	59	24	32	234
47	Hans Vogt, Jr. (H); Ulrich Seeberger	West Germany	45	PMS	50	67	46	2	235
48	Hub. Merkelbach (H); Walter Oess	West Germany	5	86	67	39	45	54	239
49	Dierk Thomsen (H); Lars Thomsen	West Germany	93	21	29	77	27	56	240
50	Thomas Oljelund (H); Lars Edwall	Sweden	8	51	61	38	72	58	246
51	Heinz Maurer (H); Gogi Eisold	Switzerland	34	19	46	91	DSQ	29	249
52	Stephen G. Gould (H); Greg Sieck	United States	44	27	20	DSQ	49	86	256
53	Ulf Malmborg (H); Christian Olsson	Sweden	29	49	68	5	77	PMS	257
54	Jacques Sarasin (H); Patrick Schriber	Switzerland	76	32	104	63	17	48	266
55	Peter Stockmayr (H); Peter Greiner	West Germany	18	61	41	28	102	89	267
56	Michael Clements (H); Robert Burton	Canada	71	28	85	48	89	10	272
57	Hemut Santer (H); Hannes Pasnocht	Austria	84	57	58	34	21	74	274
58	Peter U. Wyss (H); Arnold Winkler	Switzerland	87	39	65	49	58	35	276
59	Josef Steinmayer (H); Reto Heilig	Switzerland	13	70	51	64	71	DNS	299
60	Michael C. Hicks (H); Patrick W. Hicks	Great Britain	55	83	60	52	66	36	299
61	R. Klostermann (H); Stephan Wagner	Switzerland	61	74	87	DSQ	11	40	303
62	Charles Beek (H); Willam G. Swigart	United States	81	12	74	43	88	75	315
63	Res Bienz (H); Rolf Zeltner	Switzerland	21	63	77	DSQ	DNF	14	316
64	Alfonso Marino (H); Ricolo Saidelli	Italy	59	24	7	DNF	66	DNF	317
65	Paolo Airoldi (H); Enrico Billi	Italy	75	44	94	42	33	DSQ	318
66	Ric. Simoneschi (H); Sergio Pochini	Italy	56	DNF	89	76	25	42	318
67	Patrice Ratzel (H); Phillpe Cospain	France	26	73	71	53	76	66	319
68	Michael Nissen (H); Gerrit Bartel	West Germany	91	42	57	27	73	DNF	320
69	Hans Helut Geim (H); Ernst G. Oeser	West Germany	65	46	16	72	92	DNF	321
70	Duarte de Almeida Bello (H); Fernando B. Bello	Portugal	54	64	88	46	56	73	323
71	Gert Setzik (H); Lothar Busch	West Germany	43	40	73	61	85	85	332
72	Rob Maine III (H); Guerin Rife	United States	79	75	40	62	80	47	333
73	E.-Gunter Beck (H); Rolf Beck	Netherlands	83	93	76	60	48	49	346
74	Patrick de Barros (H); Henrique Anjos	Portugal	64	66	21	DNF	101	65	347
75	P. Migliaccio (H); Corrado Cristaldini	Italy	DNF	PMS	80	56	63	18	358
76	Miguel Lopoz (H); Augusto Sanguinetti	Spain	57	84	70	37	DNF	80	358
77	Duarte B. Bello (H); Miguel Empis	Portugal	90	72	44	57	82	79	364
78	Gui. Calegari (H); Ovidio Lagos	Argentina	94	PMS	103	44	41	53	365
79	Josef Urban (H); Stefan Fuxkandl	Austria	102	69	66	101	55	45	366
80	Pietro Tobino (H); Daniele Grandi	Italy	98	79	31	45	95	87	367
81	Bruno Marazzi (H); Stefan Haftka	Switzerland	70	PMS	106	94	9	63	372
82	Peter E. Siemsen (H); Norman MacPherson	Brazil	68	89	92	83	31	72	373
83	António Correia (H); Jorge Goncalves	Portugal	97	50	93	93	99	21	384
84	Mauro Testa (H); Gianni Testa	Italy	DNF	PMS	78	92	22	60	393
85	H. Mitterhauser (H); Thomas Richter	United States	63	PMS	54	74	62	DNF	394
86	Gert Schulte (H); Dirk Meissner	West Germany	DNF	DNF	56	87	67	44	395
87	Carlo Loos (H); Th. Schnelldorfer	West Germany	62	88	72	97	81	68	401
88	Rene J. Luedi (H); Beat Fontana	Switzerland	49	60	81	85	97	DSQ	402
89	Howard Shiebler (H); Todd C. Raynor	United States	78	80	55	84	75	PMS	402
90	Ralph Curd III (H); Neil Foley	United States	80	DSQ	69	73	44	DNF	407
91	Andrea Roost (H); Thomas Roost	Switzerland	58	62	95	54	DNF	DNS	410
92	Gunnar Dahl (H); Dennis Harding	Sweden	50	94	86	82	100	71	413
93	E. Hasupolter (H); Michael Shulz	Austria	74	90	75	71	91	76	416
94	Josef Pieper (H); Andreas Bensch	Austria	85	77	82	102	61	82	417
95	Franco Lorganesi (H); Francesco Marini	Monaco	77	82	97	80	78	70	417
96	Rudolf Baumann (H); Arnold Baumann	Switzerland	103	52	105	99	29	DNF	418
97	Hans Rossner (H); U. P. Rutishauser	West Germany	95	37	90	100	96	77	425
98	Hannes Gubler (H); Willi Spellbrink	Switzerland	88	76	98	90	53	88	425
99	Narciso Castelli (H); Nerso Madena	Italy	101	59	96	98	68	DNF	425
100	Gio. Fenaroli (H); G. Paolo Fenini	Italy	99	71	100	78	33	67	428
101	Aurelio Quarti (H); Paolo Penco	Italy	69	78	83	81	90	DNF	431
102	Mario Caprile (H); Guido Sodano	Spain	100	85	DNF	88	52	78	433
103	Joe Bainton (H); Rick Hennig	United States	104	92	79	DSQ	60	69	434
104	Arnold Osterwalder (H); Peter Hoehne	Switzerland	DSQ	67	64	103	98	83	445
105	Gerd Hanelt (H); Rudolf Dahnk	West Germany	96	95	91	86	93	55	450
106	Hernardo Silva (H); Martin P. de Melo	Portugal	86	81	84	89	103	84	464
107	Harry W. Walker (H); Steven Cox	United States	106	87	101	96	87	81	482
108	Argelo Mario (H); Antonio Bottini	Italy	82	68	99	95	DNF	DNS	485
109	Alberto Zanetti (H); Miguel Costa	Argentina	92	PMS	DNF	79	94	PMS	517
110	Bruno Pedrazzani (H); Enrico Cereda	Italy	105	96	102	104	104	DNS	541

Legend: DNF – Did not finish; DNS – Did not start; DSQ – Disqualified; PMS – Premature start; YMP – Yacht materially prejudiced;
