= 2015 Star World Championships =

Event title
- Edition: 92nd

Event details
- Venue: Buenos Aires, Argentina
- Dates: 1–10 November
- Yachts: Star
- Titles: 1

Results
- (gold) Gold: (Brazil) Grael & Gonçalves
- (silver) Silver: (Brazil) Fuchs & Seifert
- (bronze) Bronze: (Italy) Negri & Lambertenghi

The 2015 Star World Championships were held in Buenos Aires, Argentina November 01-10, 2015.

== Results ==
Results of individual races
Pos	Crew	Country	I	II	III	IV	V	VI	Pts
Gold medal	Lars Grael (H); Samuel Gonçalves	Brazil	1	11	7	3	7	3	21
Silver medal	Marcelo Fuchs (H); Ronald Seifert	Brazil	15	14	2	8	1	5	30
Bronze medal	Diego Negri (H); Sergio Lambertenghi	Italy	5	1	1	21	14	10	31

Legend: DNF – Did not finish; DNS – Did not start; DSQ – Disqualified; PMS – Premature start; RET – Retired; YMP – Yacht materially prejudiced;
