= 2013 Star World Championships =

The 2013 Star World Championships were held in San Diego, United States between August 28 and September 8, 2013.

== Results ==
Class	Gold	Silver	Bronze
Star	United States; John MacCausland; Phil Trinter	United States; Andrew Campbell; John von Schwarz	United States; Mark Reynolds; Hal Haenel
