= Frithjof Kleen =

German sailor (born 1983)

Personal information
- Nickname: Frida
- Nationality: Germany
- Born: 25 June 1983 (age 43) Berlin, West Germany
- Height: 189 cm (6 ft 2 in)
- Weight: 110 kg (243 lb)

Sailing career
- Sport: Sailing
- Club: Norddeutscher Regatta Verein
- Coached by: Alan Smith
- Class: Keelboat
Medal record
Sailing
Representing Germany
5.5 Metre World Championship
Gold medal – first place	2013 Curaçao	5.5m
Star World Championship
Gold medal – first place	2025 Split	Star
Gold medal – first place	2014 Malcesine	Star
Silver medal – second place	2011 Perth	Star

Frithjof Kleen (born 25 June 1983 in Berlin) is a German sailor, who specialized in two-person keelboat (Star) class. He represented Germany, along with his partner Robert Stanjek in the Star class at the 2012 Summer Olympics, and also captured a silver medal at the 2011 ISAF Sailing World Championships in Perth, Australia. Kleen has also been training throughout most of his sporting career for the North German Sailing Regatta (German: Norddeutscher Regatta Verein) in Hamburg under his personal coach Alan Smith.

Kleen qualified as a crew member for the German squad in the Star class at the 2012 Summer Olympics in London by placing second and receiving a berth from the ISAF World Championships in Perth, Western Australia. Teaming with his partner Robert Stanjek in the opening series, the German duo recorded a net score of 70 points throughout the entire race, but came up short for the medal podium with a satisfying sixth position against a fleet of sixteen boats.
