= Arne Åkerson =

Swedish sailor

Arne Åkerson (born 23 August 1940 in Gävle, Sweden) is a Swedish former Olympic sailor. He competed in 1968 Summer Olympics, where he finished 7th in the Finn class. He also has a silver medal from the 1970 Star World Championship together with Ding Schoonmaker.

Åkerson represented Gefle Segelsällskap.
