= George Parsons (sailor) =

Canadian sailor

George Robert Parsons (19 May 1911 – 12 August 1996) was a Canadian sailor who competed in the 1956 Summer Olympics. He was born, and died in Vancouver.
