= William Carl Buchan =

American sailor

Personal information
- Born: December 23, 1956 (age 69) Seattle, Washington, U.S.

Sport
- College team: University of Washington
Medal record
Men's sailing
Representing the United States
Olympic Games
Gold medal – first place	1984 Los Angeles	Flying Dutchman
North American Championships
Gold medal – first place	1976 Seattle	Soling

William Carl Buchan (born December 23, 1956) is an American sailor and Olympic Champion. He won the ICSA Men's Singlehanded National Championship and was named College Sailor of the Year in 1977. He competed at the 1984 Summer Olympics in Los Angeles and won a gold medal in the Flying Dutchman class.

He sailed for Stars & Stripes when they defended the 1988 America's Cup.

His father William E. Buchan won a gold medal in the Star class at the 1984 Olympics and 11 medals at the Star World Championship. Carl attended Mercer Island High School in Mercer Island, Washington.
