= William Glenn Waterhouse =

American sailor (1893–1973)

William Glenn Waterhouse (April 18, 1893 in Cedar Rapids, Iowa – December 9, 1973 in Berkeley, California) was an American Olympic sailor in the Star class. He competed in the 1932 Summer Olympics together with Woodbridge Metcalf, where they finished 5th. He was also a member of the United States at the 1936 Summer Olympics in the 2-person keelboat, open.
