= Phil Trinter =

American sailor (born 1969)

Phil Trinter (born January 8, 1969, in Lorain, Ohio) is an American Olympic sailor in the Star class. He competed in the 2004 Summer Olympics together with Paul Cayard, where they finished 5th. Trinter has also become Star World Champion two times, in 1993 and 2013.

Trinter sailed with Stars & Stripes at the 1995 America's Cup and with AmericaOne in the 2000 Louis Vuitton Cup.

He attended Indiana University, where he played football, including the 1990 Peach Bowl and three other bowl games.
