= Mats Hansson =

Swedish sailor (born 1965)

Mats Bertil Hansson (born 11 June 1965 in Kungsbacka) is a Swedish former sailor who competed in the 1988 Summer Olympics, where he finished 4th in the Star class together with Mats Johansson.
