= Woodbridge Metcalf =

American sailor

Woodbridge "Woody" Metcalf (June 23, 1888 in Grosse Pointe, Michigan – July 11, 1972 in Berkeley, California) was an American forester and Olympic sailor in the Star class. He competed in the 1932 Summer Olympics together with William Glenn Waterhouse, where they finished 5th. He is also known for his work in forest conservation and as a photographer of the forests and trees of California.

== Honors ==
Metcalf received the Nash Merit Award Certificate in 1954.
