= Diego Negri =

Italian sailor

Personal information
- Born: 16 April 1971 (age 55) Sestri Levante, Italy

Sport
- Sport: Sailing
Medal record
Representing Italy
Mediterranean Games
Gold medal – first place	2001 Tunis	Laser
Silver medal – second place	1997 Bari	Laser
Silver medal – second place	2005 Almería	Laser
Summer Universiade
Bronze medal – third place	1999 Palma de Mallorca	Laser

Diego Negri (born 16 April 1971) is an Italian former yacht racer who competed in the 2000 Summer Olympics, the 2004 Summer Olympics, and the 2008 Summer Olympics.
