= Claus Wunderlich =

German sailor (1922–1995)

Personal information
- Full name: Claus Egbert Maximilian Frank Wunderlich
- Nationality: German
- Born: 9 January 1922 Hamburg, Germany
- Died: 22 September 1995 (aged 73) Hamburg, Germany

Sport
- Sport: Sailing

Claus Wunderlich (9 January 1922 – 22 September 1995) was a German sailor. He competed in the Star event at the 1952 Summer Olympics, finishing in eleventh place alongside Paul Fischer. He was a member of the Alster-Piraten Club and wrote multiple books and articles about sailing.
