= Steve Erickson (sailor) =

American sailor (born 1961)

Personal information
- Full name: Steven Richard Erickson
- Born: August 14, 1961 (age 64) Minneapolis, Minnesota, U.S.

Sailing career
- Sport: Sailing
- Class: Star
Medal record
Men's sailing
Representing the United States
Olympic Games
Gold medal – first place	1984 Los Angeles	Star
World Championships
Gold medal – first place	1985 Nassau	Star class
Gold medal – first place	1988 Buenos Aires	Star class
Gold medal – first place	1988 San Francisco	Maxi class
Gold medal – first place	1995 Klintholm	ILC 40
Gold medal – first place	1996 Athens	ILC 40
Bronze medal – third place	1982 Medemblik	Star class
Bronze medal – third place	1987 Chicago	Star class
Bronze medal – third place	1992 San Francisco	Star class
North American Championship
Gold medal – first place	2009 Westport	Star class

Steven Richard Erickson (born August 14, 1961) is an American sailor and Olympic champion in the Star class. He competed at the 1984 Summer Olympics in Los Angeles and won a gold medal in the Star together with William Earl Buchan.

== Career ==
=== Olympic sailing in the Star class ===
Born in Minneapolis, Minnesota, and just finished with studies at University of Washington, Erickson won the gold medal in the Star event at the 1984 Summer Olympics.

Steve Erickson continued in the Star class and won the Star World Championship two times: in 1985 with William Earl Buchan; and, in 1988 with Paul Cayard.

=== America's Cup and Whitbread Round the World Race ===
Erickson's first America's Cup was with Tom Blackaller, on the 12 Metre US 61 USA R-1 from San Francisco. He served as the mainsail trimmer during the 1987 America's Cup in Perth, Western Australia.

At the 1992 America's Cup, Erickson was one of the coaches for the Il Moro Challenge.

At the 1995 America's Cup, Erickson was a trimmer on board Dennis Conner Stars & Stripes.

Erickson won the 1997–98 Whitbread Round the World Race as part of the EF Language crew, before joining Luna Rossa as their coach for the 2000 Louis Vuitton Cup, which they won. He was a member of the boat's afterguard during the 2003 Louis Vuitton Cup, before working as their operations manager at the 2007 and 2013 Louis Vuitton Cups. Erickson also spent time with the 2007 Ben Ainslie Team Origin.

=== Star class again ===
Erickson, together Mark Reynolds, tried to qualify for the 2004 Summer Olympics.

In 2009, Erickson won the Star North American Championship in Westport crewing for Andy Horton.
