= Joe Duplin =

American sailor in the Star sailboat class (1934–2016)

Joseph R. Duplin (May 30, 1934 – August 7, 2016) was an American sailor in the Star class who won the 1963 Star World Championship together with Francis Dolan.

Duplin died at his home on August 7, 2016, due to complications from Alzheimer's disease. He was 82.
