= Eduardo Farré =

Argentine sailor

Personal information
- Nationality: Argentine
- Born: 16 October 1942 (age 82)

Sport
- Sport: Sailing

Eduardo Farré (born 16 October 1942) is an Argentine sailor. He competed in the Star event at the 2000 Summer Olympics.
