= William Earl Buchan =

American sailor

Personal information
- Born: May 9, 1935 (age 91) Seattle, Washington, U.S.

Sailing career
- Sport: Sailing
- Club: Corinthian Yacht Club of Seattle
- Class: Star
Medal record
Sailing
Representing United States
Olympic Games
| Gold medal – first place | 1984 Los Angeles | Star class |
World Championships
| Gold medal – first place | 1961 San Diego | Star class |
| Gold medal – first place | 1970 Marstrand | Star class |
| Gold medal – first place | 1985 Nassau | Star class |
| Silver medal – second place | 1973 San Diego | Star class |
| Silver medal – second place | 1976 Nassau | Star class |
| Silver medal – second place | 1979 Marstrand | Star class |
| Bronze medal – third place | 1965 Newport | Star class |
| Bronze medal – third place | 1981 Marblehead | Star class |
| Bronze medal – third place | 1982 Medemblik | Star class |
| Bronze medal – third place | 1983 Marina del Rey | Star class |

William Eastman Buchan (born May 9, 1935) is an American sailor and Olympic Champion. He competed at the 1984 Summer Olympics in Los Angeles and won a gold medal in the Star class with Steven Erickson.

He sailed on Intrepid in the 1974 America's Cup defender trials.

== Biography ==
Buchan was born on May 9, 1935, in Seattle, Washington. He was the son of Bill Buchan Sr.

He won ten medals at Star World Championships (from 1961 to 1985), including three golds. His son William Carl Buchan won a gold medal in the Flying Dutchman class at the 1984 Olympics. Buchan was inducted into the National Sailing Hall of Fame in 2013.

== See also ==
- Star World Championships – Multiple medallist
