= Roberto Benamati =

Italian yacht racer

Roberto Benamati (born 27 June 1960) is an Italian former yacht racer who competed in the 1992 Summer Olympics.
