= Paul Fischer (sailor) =

German sailor

Personal information
- Full name: Paul Elimar Wolfgang Hans Maria Fischer
- Nickname: Bimmy
- Nationality: German
- Born: 3 May 1922 Frankfurt am Main, Germany

Sailing career
- Sport: Sailing
- Class: Star

Paul Elmar Fischer (born 3 May 1922) was a German sailor. He competed in the star event at the 1952 Summer Olympics, finishing in eleventh place alongside Claus Wunderlich. He was a prominent member of the Bayerischer Yacht-Club.
