= Ed Adams (sailor) =

American sailor

Personal information
- Full name: Edward K. Adams
- Spouse: Meredith Adams

Edward K. Adams, known as Ed Adams, is an American sailor in the Star, Snipe, and Laser classes. He was named US Sailor of the Year in 1987 and 1991.

In the Laser class, 1975 US national champion, and 1976 bronze medal at the Laser World Championship.

At college, he won in 1977 the ICSA Coed Dinghy National Championship with the University of Rhode Island, and was named All-American.

Adams won the North American Championship five times (1981, 1983, 1985, 1987 and 1993) and the United States National Championship twice (1986 and 1991) in the Snipe class.

He became world champion of the Star class at the 1987 Star World Championships in Chicago, and won the bronze medal at the 1986 Worlds. He also won the Star European Championships in 1988 and the Bacardi Cup in 1988 and 1991.

After leaving the Star, he was appointed coach of the US Olympic Sailing team of 2000 and 2004, while also participating at the 2000 Louis Vuitton Cup as navigator onboard of Young America with Ed Baird. Two years later, in 2002, he won the Laser Master Worlds.

He joined the Delta Lloyd's coaching team for the Boston in-port race of the 2008–09 Volvo Ocean Race. Previously, he sailed the final two legs of Illbruck Challenge's victorious campaign in the 2001-02 event.

He was inducted into the National Sailing Hall of Fame in 2022.
