= Nicolò Rode =

Italian sailor

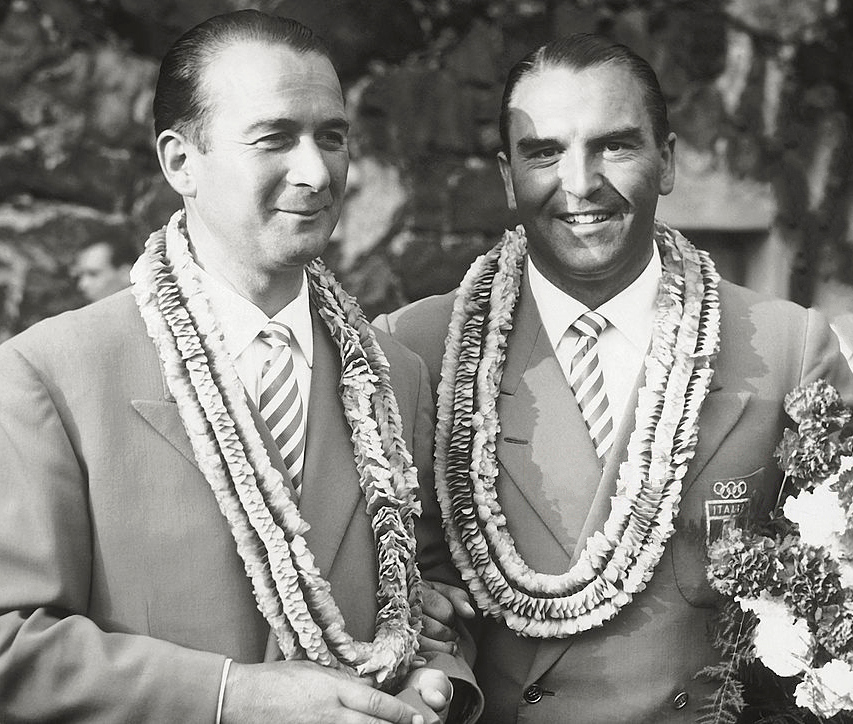
- Agostino Straulino and Nicolò Rode (right) at the 1952 Olympics

Personal information
- Nationality: Italy
- Born: 1 January 1912 Lussin Piccolo, Austria-Hungary
- Died: 4 May 1998 (aged 86) Verona, Italy

Sailing career
- Sport: Sailing
- Class: Star
Medal record
Sailing
Representing Italy
Olympic Games
Gold medal – first place	1952 Helsinki	Star class
Silver medal – second place	1956 Melbourne	Star class
World Championships
Gold medal – first place	1952 Cascais	Star class
Gold medal – first place	1953 Naples	Star class
Gold medal – first place	1956 Naples	Star class
Silver medal – second place	1939 Kiel	Star class
Silver medal – second place	1948 Cascais	Star class
Bronze medal – third place	1954 Cascais	Star class

Nicolò "Nico" Rode (1 January 1912 – 4 May 1998) was an Italian sailor. He competed at the 1948, 1952 and 1956 Olympics in the Star class with skipper Agostino Straulino on Merope. They won a gold medal in 1952 and a silver in 1956 and finished fifth in 1948.

Like Straulino, Rode was born in Mali Lošinj on the island of Lošinj, Croatia (at that time in the Austrian part of Austria-Hungary).
