= Lowell North =

American competitive sailor (1929–2019)

Personal information
- Full name: Lowell Orton North
- Nickname: "The Pope"
- Nationality: American
- Born: December 2, 1929 Springfield, Missouri, U.S.
- Died: June 2, 2019 (aged 89) San Diego, California, U.S.

Sailing career
- Sport: Sailing
- College team: University of California, Berkeley
- Club: San Diego Yacht Club
- Classes: Dragon, Star
Medal record
Men's sailing
Representing the United States
Olympic Games
Gold medal – first place	1968 Mexico City	Star class
Bronze medal – third place	1964 Tokyo	Dragon class
World Championships
Gold medal – first place	1945 Central Long Island Sound	Star class
Gold medal – first place	1957 Havana	Star class
Gold medal – first place	1959 Newport Harbor	Star class
Gold medal – first place	1960 Rio de Janeiro	Star class
Gold medal – first place	1973 San Diego	Star class
Silver medal – second place	1956 Naples	Star class
Silver medal – second place	1963 Chicago	Star class
Silver medal – second place	1966 Kiel	Star class
Silver medal – second place	1967 Copenhagen	Star class
Silver medal – second place	1971 Puget Sound	Star class
Bronze medal – third place	1961 San Diego	Star class
Bronze medal – third place	1969 San Diego	Star class

Lowell Orton North (December 2, 1929 – June 2, 2019) was an American competitive sailor and sailmaker. He competed at the 1968 Summer Olympics in Mexico City, where he received a gold medal in the Star class with the boat North Star, together with Peter Barrett.

He founded North Sails.

== Biography ==
North was born in Springfield, Missouri on December 2, 1929. He was the son of Williard North, a geophysicist for oil companies, and Juanita Williams North, a homemaker. When Lowell was young the family moved to Southern California, where he learned to sail in Newport Beach and later in San Diego.

He got his start as a sailmaker at the age of 14, when he and his father raced Star class boats and regularly lost. He recut the sail and improved their record. In 1945, at age 15, he crewed for Malin Burnham in the Star World Championship, which they won. North later said, "It wasn’t me Malin wanted. It was my mainsail." During the next 30 years he won another four Star Worlds.

He studied at San Diego State College and earned a degree in civil engineering from the University of California, Berkeley. He worked as a structural engineer in the aerospace industry, but sail design remained his main passion. He opened his first sail making company in the late 1950s, where "his methodical and scientific approach to sailmaking changed the industry." He used computer modeling, new materials, and advanced manufacturing techniques. In 1957 he founded North Sails, a world-wide company producing sailing equipment, in San Diego.

He received a bronze medal in the Dragon class at the 1964 Summer Olympics in Tokyo.

North participated in 1977 America's Cup defender series where he skippered the 12 metre yacht Enterprise.

North retired in 1984. In 2011, he was inducted into the National Sailing Hall of Fame.

== Personal life ==
In 1956 he married Kay Gillette North (March 9, 1933 – September 5, 2021). They had three children: Danny, Holly, and Julie. They later divorced. In 1994 he married Helen Beatrice Davidson, known as Bea, who survived him.

== See also ==
- Star World Championship – Multiple medallist
- List of Olympic medalists in Dragon class sailing
