= Carlos de Cárdenas Jr. =

Cuban sailor (1932–1990)

Personal information
- Full name: Carlos de Cárdenas Plá
- Nationality: Cuba
- Born: 7 July 1932 Havana, Cuba
- Died: 6 May 1990 (aged 57)

Sailing career
- Sport: Sailing
- Class: Star
Medal record
Sailing
Representing Cuba
Olympic Games
Silver medal – second place	1948 London	Star class
World Championships
Gold medal – first place	1954 Cascais	Star class
Gold medal – first place	1955 Havana	Star class

Carlos de Cárdenas Plá (7 July 1932 – 6 May 1990) was a Cuban sailor. He won a silver medal in Star class sailing at the 1948 Summer Olympics in London.
