= Carlos de Cárdenas =

Cuban sailor (1904–1994)

Personal information
- Full name: Carlos Teodor de Cárdenas Culmell
- Nationality: Cuban
- Born: January 2, 1904 Havana, Cuba
- Died: September 24, 1994 (aged 90) Miami, Florida, U.S.

Sailing career
- Sport: Sailing
- Class: Star
Medal record
Sailing
Representing United States
Olympic Games
Silver medal – second place	1948 London	Star class
World Championships
Gold medal – first place	1954 Cascais	Star class
Gold medal – first place	1955 Havana	Star class
Bronze medal – third place	1943 Great South Bay	Star class

Carlos Teodor de Cárdenas Culmell (January 2, 1904 – September 24, 1994) was a Cuban Olympic sailor who won a silver medal in the 1948 Summer Olympics. He also placed fourth in the 1952 Summer Olympics and sixth in the 1956 Summer Olympics.

De Cárdenas was the father of Cuban Olympic sailors Carlos de Cárdenas Jr. and Jorge de Cárdenas. He also won a World Championship {Gold] Star in Chicago, Illinois. De Cárdenas died in Miami on September 24, 1994, at the age of 90.
