= Tom Blackaller =

American yachtsman (1940–1989)

Personal information
- Full name: Thomas David Blackaller Jr.
- Born: January 6, 1940 Seattle, Washington, U.S.
- Died: September 7, 1989 (aged 49)

Sailing career
- Sport: Sailing
- Class(es): Star, 6 Metre, 12 Metre
Medal record
World Championships
| Gold medal – first place | 1974 Laredo | Star class |
| Gold medal – first place | 1980 Rio de Janeiro | Star class |
| Silver medal – second place | 1969 San Diego | Star class |
| Silver medal – second place | 1975 Lake Michigan | Star class |
| Bronze medal – third place | 1973 San Diego | Star class |
| Bronze medal – third place | 1978 San Francisco | Star class |

Thomas David Blackaller Jr. (January 6, 1940 – September 7, 1989) was a world-champion American yachtsman, America's Cup helmsman, sailmaker, and racecar competitor. He was a two-time world champion in the Star class keelboat, a world champion in the international Six metre class, raced in three separate America's Cup campaigns, and influenced the careers of many other sailors.

== Early life ==
Blackaller was born January 6, 1940, in Seattle, Washington. He moved with his parents to the San Francisco Bay area as a child and began sailing when he was 10 years old.

== Sailing career ==
Tom Blackaller initially rose to prominence sailing Star class keelboats. He bought his first Star boat in 1957, a chubby hull #2482, named "Spirit." Seeking a faster boat, Blackaller ordered a new boat that winter from boatmaker Carl Eichenlaub. This became boat hull #3938, which he named Good Grief! He later obtained a second, newer boat hull (#5150), retaining the boat name Good Grief! Sailing this second boat in 1968 he won his first major events, taking a Silver Star at the Western Hemisphere Spring Championship and then a second Silver Star at the North American Championship. Blackaller won district championships (5th District) in 1971 and in 1979. In 1974 and 1980 he won the Star Class world championship, receiving Gold Stars for those wins.

He became known among fellow competitors as Charlie Brown, because he liked to clown around, and the name of his boat evoked the character of the same name from the Peanuts comic strip by Charles Schulz.

As Blackaller became more accomplished he began competing internationally, initially in the 6-Meter class. In 1969 the St. Francis Yacht Club became involved in the Australian-American Challenge, a new international 6-Meter competition. The club bought an Olin Stephens-designed 6-Meter named Toogooloowoo IV, originally owned by John Taylor of Australia. Renamed St. Francis, Blackaller helmed her to victory in the November 1970 challenge in Australia, defeating the very same John Taylor and his new Stephens Six, Toogooloowoo V. The first World Cup in 6-Meters was held in Seattle in 1973, which Blackaller also won.

Blackaller's fame in yacht racing grew largely through sailing 12 Meters in his America's Cup campaigns of 1980, 1983 and 1986. Blackaller came aboard as tactician for helmsman Russell Long and his defender entrant Clipper, but the boat lost out for the right to represent the New York Yacht Club in defense of the America's Cup to Dennis Conner and Freedom. In 1983, he skippered Defender, but again lost to Dennis Conner, this time sailing Liberty, which ultimately lost the Cup to the wing keeled Australia II. In 1986, Blackaller became skipper of USA (US-61), a very fast, experimental design with fore-and-aft rudders and a ballast pod known as "the geek." USA (US-61) was one of thirteen yachts that competed to be selected challenger for the America's Cup. She reached the Louis Vuitton Cup Semi-finals, where she lost to Conner's Stars & Stripes 87. Stars & Stripes 87 went on to win 1987 America's Cup.

By 1988, Blackaller turned to multihull sailing. This marked his shift from quasi-amateur status to paid professional sailor. He began to campaign a Formula 40 catamaran in the $500,000 ProSail Series, which commenced August 11, 1988, in Newport, Rhode Island. The four-day regatta in Newport was the first of three national meets that year that included San Francisco, Oct. 6–9, and Miami, Dec. 8–11. (Lloyd, 1988) In the 1989 ProSail Series, he helmed his catamaran to win two races to one against Randy Smyth, reported at the time as America's top catamaran sailor. Blackaller was preparing to compete in the San Francisco race of that series at the time of his death.

Blackaller was inducted into the National Sailing Hall of Fame in 2013.

== Motorsports involvement ==
In addition to his sailing career, Tom Blackaller also raced cars. In the early 1980s he drove a Ralt RT4 in the WCAR Formula Atlantic Championship. He switched to sportscar racing in the IMSA (International Motor Sports Association) Championship. In March 1989, he finished 25th overall in the 12 Hours of Sebring in a Spice SE88P-Buick. He went on to drive an Argo JM19-Mazda entered by Jim Downing.

Later in 1989, Blackaller entered a Swift Engineering DB2 Sports 2000 with Sonoma County (California)-based Pfeiffer Ridge Racing for the IMSA 300 Kilometer race to be held at nearby Sears Point Raceway (now Infineon Raceway), on 10 September of that year.

Blackaller suffered a heart attack while practicing for that race.

== Sailmaking career ==
Blackaller worked as a sailmaker for Lowell North, a position that helped to cover the costs of most of his racing as an amateur and quasi-amateur. He managed the North Loft in San Francisco 1973–80 and North Sails West 1980–85. He was considered one of North's most visible and audible "Tigers."

== Colorful personality ==
What made Blackaller so widely known was his extremely colorful, opinionated, free-wheeling, and mischievous personality. Blackaller stories were so prevalent and enjoyed that web pages sprang up following his death to share them. On September 9, 2009, occasioned by the 20th anniversary of his death, a tribute was held by his friends and colleagues at the Rolex San Francisco Big Boat Series at the St. Francis Yacht Club, recounting many of these tales. The tribute was preceded by a collection of tales at the daily sailing electronic news feed Sailing Scuttlebutt. and by posting of a dedicated website.

== Death ==
On Thursday, September 7, 1989, Blackaller was practicing for the SCCA Pro Sports 2000 race to be held on September 10 at Sears Point Raceway in Sonoma County when he suffered a heart attack at the wheel of his car. He was a guest driver for Bob Lesnett's team. The car slowed after exiting the famous high speed turn known as the carousel. Witnesses described that the car "parked itself gently" on the left side of the track prior to entering turn 7. The car sustained minimal to no damage due to Tom's efforts to pull safely off the track. Rescuers found Blackaller unconscious. He was immediately transferred by helicopter to Queen of the Valley Hospital in Napa, California, where he later was pronounced dead.

== Family ==
Blackaller was survived by his wife, Christine; his daughters, Lisa and Brooke, both of San Francisco; his father, Thomas Sr, and his two sisters Nancy Hardie and Lois Wolfe.

== Blackaller Buoy ==
Following Blackaller's death, members of the St. Francis Yacht Club decided to establish one of their permanent racing marks as the "Blackaller Buoy." It is a buoy that forms an official racecourse mark for yacht racing on San Francisco Bay. The Yacht Racing Association of San Francisco Bay lists it as mark number 16. The buoy is a yellow column-shaped buoy labeled in black letters "Blackaller," 0.2 nautical miles (0.37 km) east of San Francisco's Fort Point. Contemporaries cited his colorful personality along with his demonstrated racing acumen as central to his impact on sailing. YRA Mark 16 was designated the Thomas D. Blackaller Jr. Memorial Buoy by the YRA Board of Directors, and its maintenance is funded by the Thomas D. Blackaller Jr. Fund.
