= Carlo Rolandi =

Italian sailor and sports administrator (1926–2020)

Personal information
- Nationality: Italian
- Born: July 2, 1926 Naples, Italy
- Died: August 7, 2020 (aged 94) Naples, Italy

Sailing career
- Sport: Sailing
- Class: Star

Achievements and titles
- Olympic finals: 1948, 1956, 1960, 1964, 1968
- Regional finals: European Championships: 1959, 1965
- National finals: Italian Championships: 1957, 1961, 1962, 1964, 1965

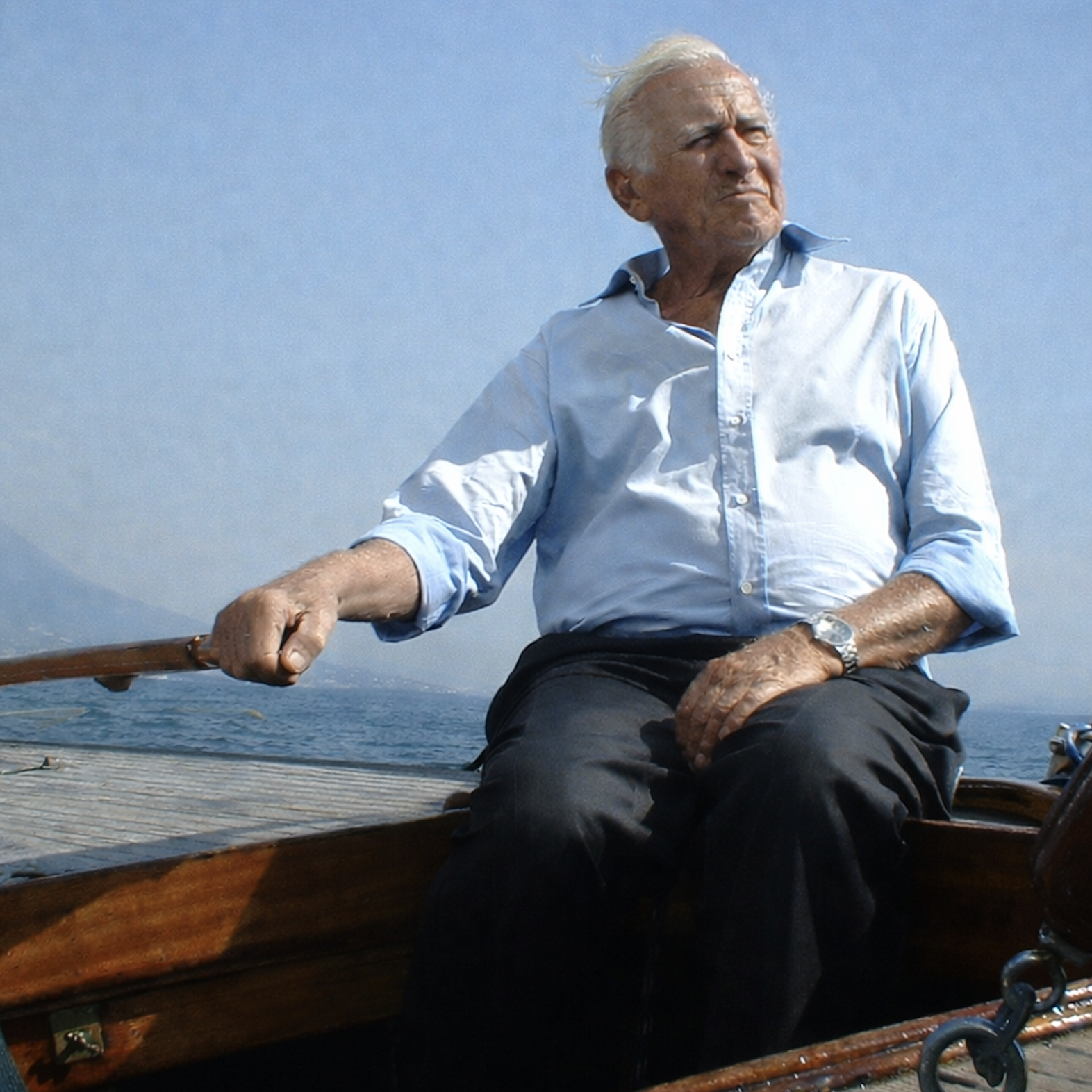
Carlo Rolandi in 2003 on the 8 Metre I.R. Italia, the historic boat that won the gold medal at the 1936 Olympics.

Carlo Rolandi (2 July 1926 – 7 August 2020) was an Italian sailor and sports administrator. He competed in the Star class at five editions of the Olympic Games and later held senior roles in the sport at both national and international level, including the presidency of the Italian Sailing Federation (FIV).

== Sporting career ==
Rolandi began his sporting career in rowing, winning the Coppa Lysistrata in 1945. He later turned to competitive sailing, making his debut in the Star class in 1946 aboard the boat Libellula. It was in this class that he achieved the greatest successes of his career, although over the years he also raced in numerous other classes, including the Dinghy, 8 Metre, Dragon, 5.5 Metre, Tempest, Soling, IOR and RORC.

=== Main results ===
In the Star class he won the following titles:

- European Championships: gold medals in 1959 and 1965
- Italian Championships: five titles (1957, 1961, 1962, 1964, 1965)
- Foreign national championships: French champion (1957) and German champion (1958)
- Kieler Woche: winner in 1959 and 1960
- Coppa Tito Nordio: winner in 1962, 1963, 1965, 1966 and 1967

In the IOR class, he won the Regata dei Tre Golfi in 1978.

=== Olympic Games ===
Rolandi represented Italy at five editions of the Olympic Games:

- London 1948 (Torquay)
- Melbourne 1956 (Port Phillip Bay)
- Rome 1960 (Naples), as bowman for Agostino Straulino, with whom he finished fourth
- Tokyo 1964 (Enoshima)
- Mexico City 1968 (Acapulco)

== Administrative career ==
After retiring from competition, Rolandi began a long administrative career within the Italian Sailing Federation (FIV), serving as:

- Vice President, 1976–1981
- President, 1981–1988
- Honorary President for life, from 1988

At international level, he held senior positions within World Sailing (then the IYRU, later the ISAF). From 1980 he served as an international judge, sitting on the federation's Review Board. As a jury member or jury president, he took part in numerous international regattas and in three further editions of the Olympic Games:

- Los Angeles 1984 (Long Beach): international jury
- Seoul 1988 (Busan): international jury
- Barcelona 1992: official representative of the international federation

=== America's Cup ===
Rolandi was associated with several historic Italian America's Cup campaigns:

- In 1983, in Newport, Rhode Island, he served as FIV President during Italy's first America's Cup campaign with Azzurra.
- In 2003 he was present in Auckland for the Luna Rossa challenge.
- In 2007, aged 81, he took part in the Valencia edition aboard Mascalzone Latino as the campaign's "eighteenth man".

== Honours ==
- 1957 – Silver Medal for Athletic Valour (CONI)
- 1984 – Gold Star for Sporting Merit (CONI)
- 1994 – IYRU Gold Medal, for his contribution to the development of the world federation
- 1997 – Beppe Croce Trophy, the first Italian to receive the award
- 2012 – "Gabrio de Szombathely" Award, inaugural edition, for best race judge
- 2015 – "Cofradia Europea de Vela" Award

== Club affiliations ==
Rolandi was a longtime member of the Circolo Canottieri Napoli, serving as its president from 1971 to 1973. He was also associated with several of Italy's leading sailing clubs, including the Circolo del Remo e della Vela Italia, the Club Nautico della Vela, the Yacht Club Italiano (of which he was vice president from 1987 to 1991), the Yacht Club Adriaco and the Circolo Vela Gargnano, and was a founding and honorary member of the Reale Yacht Club Canottieri Savoia.

He was also active in the Rotary Club Napoli, which he joined in 1961, serving as its president in 1989–1990 and as governor of District 2100 in 1993–1994. For his community service he was awarded the Paul Harris Fellow recognition by Rotary International.

== Professional and personal life ==
Rolandi graduated in economics and business from the University of Naples Federico II in 1950. He worked as a chartered accountant, founding one of the first partnership accounting firms in Naples and specialising in corporate and administrative law.

He served on the boards of several banks, public bodies and private companies. From 1972 to 1995 he was president and chief executive of Metropolitana di Napoli, and was a leading figure in the design and construction of Line 1 of the Naples Metro, whose first section opened in 1993.

In 1952 he married Laura Carsana; they had two children. His grandson is the Olympic rower Matteo Castaldo.
