= Alexander Hagen =

German sailor

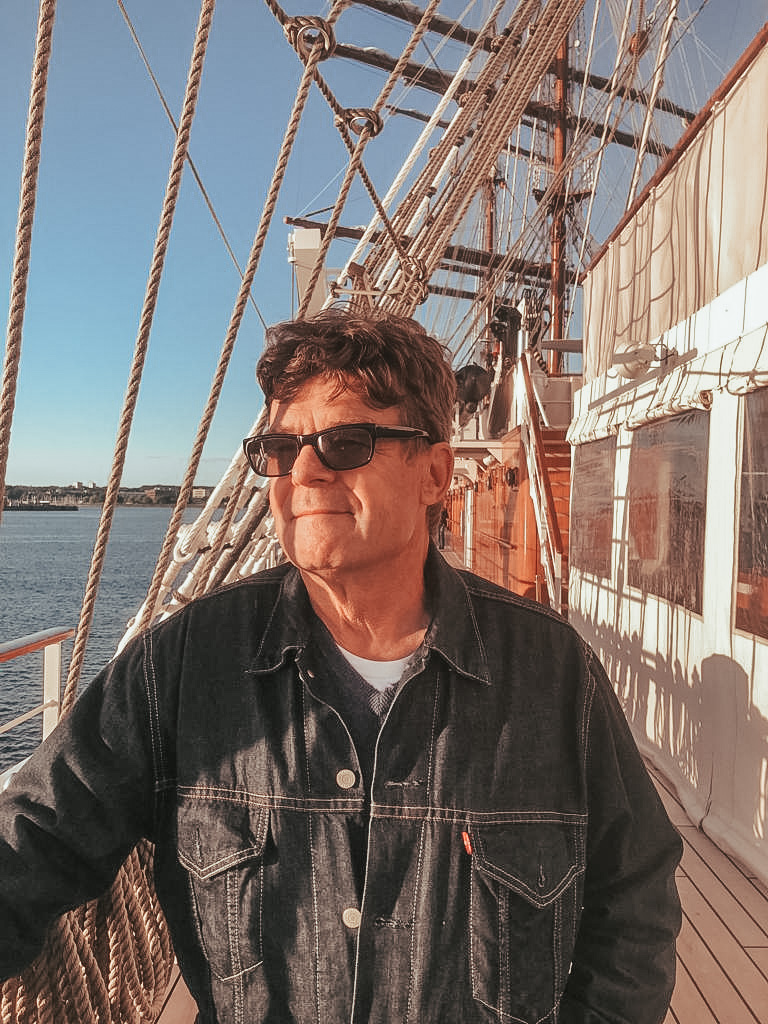
Alexander Hagen.jpg

Alexander Hagen (born 1 January 1955 in Lübeck) is a German sailor. He won the world championship in the Star class in 1981 and 1997. He also won 7 Continental Championships (silver stars) and the European Championship in OK-Dinghy in 1975.

Hagen competed at the 1988 and 2004 Olympics. He invented a mathematical formula that limits the crew weight in the Star class.
