= Sloane Farrington =

Bahamian sailor

Sloane Elmo Farrington (17 May 1923 – 1997) was a Bahamian competitive sailor and Olympic medalist. He won a bronze medal in the Star class at the 1956 Summer Olympics in Melbourne, together with Durward Knowles. He also won gold in the 1959 Pan American Games star class (with Durward Knowles). He had previously represented Great Britain at the 1948 Summer Olympics.
