= Paul Smart (sailor) =

American sailor

- Paul Smart (left) with son Hilary after winning the sailing event at the 1948 Olympics

Personal information
- Born: Paul Hurlburt Smart; January 13, 1892 Yarmouth, Nova Scotia, Canada
- Died: June 22, 1979 (aged 87) Darien, Connecticut, U.S.
Medal record
Sailing
Representing the United States
Olympic Games
Gold medal – first place	1948 London	Star

Paul Hurlburt Smart (January 13, 1892 – June 22, 1979) was an American sailor and Olympic champion. He competed at the 1948 Summer Olympics in London, where he received a gold medal in the star class with the boat Hilarius, together with his son Hilary Smart.

== Early life and education ==
He was born in Yarmouth County, Nova Scotia. Smart earned law degrees from both Harvard and Oxford, and while at Harvard he competed in the 1912 Olympic Trials as a pole vaulter. He won his "H" in hockey in 1913 and 1914, and was on the soccer team that won the IC4A championship in 1914. In World War I, Smart served as a lieutenant in the artillery winning the Silver Star, the Distinguished Service Cross, and the Purple Heart. After the war, he initially practiced as a lawyer, but later became an investment banker. He also served as president of the Newspaper Institute. As a yachtsman, Smart won five world championships and a gold medal at the 1948 Olympics crewing for his son, Hilary Smart. He was an alternate crew member for the Star class at the 1952 Olympics, and at the 1968 and 1972 Games he was the manager of the U.S. yachting team. In 1969, he was given the Nathaniel G. Herreshoff Trophy for his contributions to the sport of sailing.
