= Mats Johansson (sailor) =

Swedish sailor

Personal information
- Full name: Alf Mats Bertil Johansson
- Born: 26 August 1956 (age 69)

Sailing career
- Sport: Sailing
- Class(es): Star, 6mR, IACC
Medal record
Silver medal – second place	1997 Cannes	6 Metre class
Bronze medal – third place	1990 Cleveland	Star class

Alf Mats Bertil Johansson (born 26 August 1956) is a Swedish Olympic sailor who competed in the 1988 Summer Olympics, finishing 4th, and in the 2000 Summer Olympics, finishing 13th. He also skippered for the Victory Challenge Louis Vuitton Cup challenge and has bronze medal from the 1990 Star World Championships in Cleveland, Ohio.

== Achievements ==
As of 27 September 2015

Year	Competition	Venue	Position	Event
1986	Star World Championships	Capri, Italy	7th	Star class
1987	Star World Championships	Chicago, United States	6th	Star class
1988	Star World Championships	Buenos Aires, Argentina	10th	Star class
1988	Olympic Games	Busan, South Korea	4th	Star class
1989	Star World Championships	Porto Cervo, Italy	11th	Star class
1990	Star World Championships	Cleveland, United States	3rd	Star class
1991	Star World Championships	Cannes, France	24th	Star class
1993	Star World Championships	Kiel, Germany	9th	Star class
1994	Star World Championships	San Diego, United States	43rd	Star class
1995	Star World Championships	Laredo, Spain	11th	Star class
1996	Star World Championships	Rio de Janeiro, Brazil	9th	Star class
1997	6 Metre World Championships	Cannes, France	2nd	6 Metre class
1998	Star World Championships	Portorož, Slovenia	4th	Star class
1999	Star World Championships	Punta Ala, Italy	6th	Star class
2000	Star World Championships	Annapolis, United States	58th	Star class
2000	Olympic Games	Sydney, Australia	13th	Star class
2009	Star World Championships	Varberg, Sweden	16th	Star class
