= Ding Schoonmaker =

American sailor (1933–2021)

Personal information
- Full name: James Martinus Schoonmaker
- Born: June 10, 1933 Pittsburgh, Pennsylvania
- Died: January 19, 2021 (aged 87) Naples, Florida

Sailing career
- Sport: Sailing
- Classes: Laser, Finn, Thistle, Flying Dutchman, Star, and Soling
Medal record
Sailing
Representing United States
World Championships
Gold medal – first place	1975 Chicago	Star
Silver medal – second place	1970 Marstrand	Star
Silver medal – second place	1972 Caracas	Star
Bronze medal – third place	1969 Copenhagen	Soling
European Championships
Gold medal – first place	1971 Cascais	Star
Gold medal – first place	1977 Lago di Garda	Star
Bronze medal – third place	1968 Naples	Star

James Martinus "Ding" Schoonmaker (June 10, 1933 – January 19, 2021) was an American sailor. He won the 1975 Star World Championship together with Jerry Ford. He also had several other podiums from the Star World Championship and Soling World Championship. Schoonmaker was inducted into the National Sailing Hall of Fame in 2018. Schoonmaker died on January 19, 2021, at the age of 87.
