= E. W. Etchells =

American architect (1911–1998)

Personal information
- Full name: Elwood Widmer Etchells
- Nickname: Skip
- Nationality: American
- Born: July 5, 1911 Philadelphia, Pennsylvania, US
- Died: December 20, 1998 (aged 87) Easton, Maryland, US

Sailing career
- Sport: Sailing
- Class: Star
Medal record
Sailing
Representing United States
World Championships
| Gold medal – first place | 1951 Gibson Island | Star class |
| Bronze medal – third place | 1945 Central Long Island Sound | Star class |
| Bronze medal – third place | 1950 Chicago | Star class |
| Bronze medal – third place | 1962 Cascais | Star class |

Elwood Widmer (E. W.) "Skip" Etchells (July 5, 1911 – December 20, 1998) was an American naval architect, boat builder and world championship sailor. He is best remembered now for the one-design racing boat that bears his name, the International Etchells class, a 30-foot-6-inch (9.30 m) keelboat that he designed in 1966. One of the most competitive classes in sailboat racing, the Etchells is often the boat of choice for the world's top sailors, including America's Cup veteran Dennis Conner, a three-time world champion in the class.

A graduate of the University of Michigan with a degree in naval architecture, Skip Etchells worked for the Navy in shipyards on the West Coast during World War II. After the war, he got a job in New York City with Sparkman & Stephens, the yacht design firm, before establishing his own boatbuilding company, Old Greenwich Boat Co., based in Old Greenwich, Connecticut. For more than 30 years beginning in the 1940s, Etchells built some of the fastest Star-class sailboats ever. He and his wife, Mary O'Toole Etchells, also campaigned in Stars for many years, traveling the world and winning regattas in the U.S., Europe, the Caribbean, and South America. In 1951, they won the Star world championship at Gibson Island, Maryland. Mary Etchells remains the only woman ever to have won the worlds in the Star class. In 1958, they won the Star North American Championships at the Tred Avon Yacht Club.

The International Etchells Class, originally called the Etchells 22 because it had a 22-foot (6.7 m) waterline length, was designed as part of a competition to select a new three-man keelboat for the Olympics. Despite emerging as the fastest boat in two sets of selection trials in Germany, in 1966 and 1967, the boat was not picked for the Olympics.
