= Portuguese Yachting Association =

National governing body for sailing

- IOC nation: Portugal (POR)
- Sport: Sailing
- Official website: www.fpvela.pt

HISTORY
- Year of formation: 1927

DEMOGRAPHICS
- Number of affiliated Sailing clubs: Approx 85

AFFILIATIONS
- International federation: International Sailing Federation (ISAF)
- ISAF members page: www.sailing.org/about-isaf/mna/portugal.php
- ISAF member since: 1928

ELECTED
- President: José Manuel Reis Nunes Leandro

SECRETARIAT
- Address: Doca de Bélém; 1300-038 Lisboa
- Country: Portugal
- Secretary General: Luís Rocha
- Number of staff: Approx. 15

FINANCE
- Company status: Association

The Portuguese Yachting Association (Portuguese: Federação Portuguesa de Vela, FPV), based in Lisbon, is the national governing body for the sport of sailing in Portugal, recognised by the World Sailing.

== Notable sailors ==
See Category:Portuguese sailors

=== Olympic sailing ===
See Category:Olympic sailors of Portugal

=== Offshore sailing ===
See Category:Portuguese sailors (sport)

== Yacht clubs ==
See Category:Yacht clubs in Portugal
