= Confederação Brasileira de Vela =

- IOC nation: Brazil (BRA)
- Sport: Sailing
- Other sports: Powerboating
- Official website: www.cbvela.org.br

HISTORY
- Year of formation: 1934

AFFILIATIONS
- International federation: International Sailing Federation (ISAF)
- ISAF members page: www.sailing.org/about-isaf/mna/brazil.php
- ISAF member since: 1941
- National Olympic Committee: Brazilian Olympic Committee

ELECTED
- President: Carlos Luiz Martins Pereira Souza

SECRETARIAT
- Address: Rio de Janeiro
- Secretary General: Ricardo Baggio de Carvalho
- Olympic team manager: Claudio Biekarck

FINANCE
- Company status: Association

The Confederação Brasileira de Vela is the national governing body for the sport of sailing in Brazil, recognised by the World Sailing.

== History ==
Founded in 1934

== Sailing Resources ==
=== Sailing Clubs ===
See Category:Yacht clubs in Brazil

=== Olympic sailing ===
See Category:Olympic sailors for Brazil

=== Offshore sailing ===
See Category:Brazilian sailors (sport)
