= 1948 Star World Championship =

Boat Racing event

Event title
- Edition: 26th

Event details
- Venue: Cascais, Portugal
- Yachts: Star
- Titles: 1

Competitors
- Competitors: 48
- Competing nations: 10

Results
- (gold) Gold: (United States) Pirie & Rugeroni
- (silver) Silver: (Italy) Straulino & Rode
- (bronze) Bronze: (United States) Smart & Smart

The 1948 Star World Championship was held in Cascais, Portugal in 1948.

== Results ==
Results of individual races
Pos	Boat name	Crew	Country	I	II	III	IV	V	Pts
Gold medal	Twin Star	Lockwood Pirie; Harry Rugeroni	United States	2	2	1	1	7	107
Silver medal	Polluce	Agostino Straulino; Nicolò Rode	Italy	1	4	2	2	5	106
Bronze medal	Hilarius	Hilary Smart; Paul Smart	United States	4	7	6	12	10	81
4	Flame	Stan Ogilvy; Gerald Daly	United States	6	WDR	4	5	4	77
5	Faneca	Duarte de Almeida Bello; Fernando Bello	Portugal	5	9	DSA	6	1	75
6	Luisa II	Tito Nordio; Luigi De Manincor	Italy	13	1	8	10	13	75
7	Starita	Bob Maas; Eddy Stutterheim	Netherlands	WDR	10	5	4	9	68
8	Moorina	Jock Sturrock; Len Fenton	Australia	8	17	3	DSA	3	65
9	Aloha II	Yves Lorion; Armand Chatord	France	16	15	7	3	14	65
10	Margabell	Ernesto de Mendonca; Antonio Silva	Portugal	7	5	DSA	9	12	63
11	Legionario	Roberto Ciappa; Carlo Rolandi	Italy	15	8	9	7	WDR	57
12	Gem II	Durward Knowles; Sloane Farrington	Bahamas	3	12	DSA	DSA	2	55
13	Bug	Ayres Costa; Ernani Simoes	Brazil	17	11	10	13	16	53
14	Espadarte	Joaquim Fiúza; Júlio Gourinho	Portugal	11	16	11	8	DSQ	50
15	Scylla	Charles Ulmer; Walter Flynn	United States	10	6	DNS	DSA	8	48
16	Vipera III	Dario Salata; Lino Cattaneo	Italy	14	3	13	WDR	WDR	42
17	Hydra II	Antonio Cosentino; Alberto Morelli	Italy	WDR	13	WDR	11	11	37
18	Kurush III	Carlos de Cárdenas; Carlos de Cárdenas Jr.	Cuba	12	18	DSA	WDR	6	36
19	Izard III	Jean Peytel; Roger Bernheim	France	9	14	WDR	DSQ	15	34
20	Fandango	Philippe Chancerel; Jean Saintenis	France	18	19	12	WDR	17	30
21	Fada III	Pierre de Montaut; J. de Montaut	France	DSQ	20	DSA	14	18	20
22	Duende	Tomas Allende; José Luis Allende	Spain	19	22	14	WDR	DNS	17
23	Chiqui IV	Rafael Elosegui; Ignacio Ganuza	Spain	WDR	21	WDR	WDR	DNS	3
24	Galerna	J. Allende; Eduardo Aznar	Spain	DSA	DNS	DNS	DNS	DNS	0

Legend: DNS – Did not start; DSA – Disabled; DSQ – Disqualified; WDR – Withdrew;
