= 1956 Star World Championship =

Event title
- Edition: 34th

Event details
- Venue: Naples, Italy
- Yachts: Star
- Titles: 1

Competitors
- Competitors: 118
- Competing nations: 13

Results
- (gold) Gold: (Italy) Straulino & Rode
- (silver) Silver: (United States) North & Hill
- (bronze) Bronze: (Cuba) de Cárdenas & de Cárdenas

The 1956 Star World Championship was held in Naples, Italy in 1956.

== Results ==
Results of individual races
Pos	Boat name	Crew	Country	I	II	III	IV	V	Pts
Gold medal	Merope III	Agostino Straulino; Nicolò Rode	Italy	5	1	8	3	4	279
Silver medal	North Star II	Lowell North; James B. Hill	United States	3	7	2	9	2	277
Bronze medal	Kurush IV	Alvaro de Cárdenas; Jorge de Cárdenas	Cuba	2	14	10	2	1	271
4	Caprice	Roberto Ciappa; Carlo Rolandi	Italy	14	9	5	1	3	268
5	Gale	Harry Gale Nye Jr. Robert Halperin	United States	1	10	4	5	10	267
6	Merope I	Antonio Cosentino; Neri Stelle	Italy	4	2	9	13	7	265
7	Faneca	Duarte de Almeida Bello; Jose Bustorff	Portugal	10	15	1	4	9	261
8	Anin	C. W. Lyon Jr. Frank Lyon	United States	12	4	6	6	12	260
9	Gam II	Philippe Chancerel; Michel Parent	France	11	5	11	19	6	248
10	Mari	Sune Carlsson; Olle Carlsson	Sweden	9	8	14	10	13	246
11	Clementine IV	Harry Adler; Luiz Ramos	Brazil	13	11	3	7	43	223
12	Conch II	Foster Clarke; Roy Cole	Bahamas	21	24	7	5	21	222
13	Frip	Georges Pisani; Noël Desaubliaux	France	8	19	16	25	11	221
14	Kurush IV	Carlos de Cárdenas; Carlos de Cárdenas Jr.	Cuba	6	32	12	26	5	219
15	Nuvola Rossa	Dario Salata; Giu. Barano	Italy	17	12	24	18	16	213
16	Katia II	Michel Gautier; Jean L. Domerc	Morocco	16	29	15	11	14	211
17	Espadarte II	Joaquim Fiúza; Fernando Pessoa	Portugal	15	3	13	11	WDR	198
18	Ma' Lindo	Mário Quina; Miguel Quina	Portugal	27	13	35	12	27	186
19	Ta Fatt	Jacob Engwall; Börje Carlsson	Sweden	23	25	21	23	24	184
20	Candide	Albert Debarge; Jean Peytel	France	37	18	18	21	31	175
21	Mechtild	Josef Pankofer; Hans G. Link	West Germany	33	31	29	28	8	171
22	Tupi	Jorge F. Geyer; J. L. Pimental	Brazil	38	16	22	39	17	168
23	Tscha-Tscha	C. E. Burkhard; F. Portier	Switzerland	35	36	26	20	15	166
24	Iris III	Walter von Hütschler; Jean Crespin	Brazil	19	41	36	14	30	160
25	Scylla	Charles Ulmer; Herbert Hild	United States	28	37	17	34	28	156
26	Vesania	Riccardo de Sangro Fondi; Gennaro De Luca	Italy	7	30	WDR	29	18	156
27	Atair	Jan Borh; Charly Joos	Switzerland	24	21	28	48	25	154
28	Hux Flux IV	Bertil Nylund; Lars Stensico	Sweden	30	57	20	20	29	144
29	Anna I	Carlo Boselli; Livio Sangulin	Italy	18	26	27	30	DSQ	139
30	Arlu III	Nanni Porro; R. Manars	Italy	29	43	38	33	22	135
31	Castore III	F. Romanello; G. de Gaetano	Italy	25	DSQ	30	35	19	131
32	Itri	Claude Metral; Henri Rungs	Morocco	31	30	31	37	20	131
33	Shitane	Maur Violette; Geo. Olivier	France	40	40	34	17	41	128
34	Zwente Bold	Hans D. Wagner; Eb. Hoesch	West Germany	42	38	43	24	26	127
35	Bu II	Tacariju de Paula; C. A. de Brito	Brazil	26	27	19	WDR	45	123
36	Asterope	Aldo Moscovita; Mario Mioni	Italy	20	55	40	32	26	117
37	Capucho IV	João Félix Capucho; Antonio Maia	Portugal	32	35	41	16	WDR	116
38	Melody	Paul Smart; Maarschalken	United States	44	33	25	46	37	115
39	Luti	Luise Castro; M. Maneres	Portugal	49	23	49	44	23	112
40	Ali Baba V	Hans Bryner; Urs Bucher	Switzerland	48	6	47	49	39	111
41	Vega VI	Fred. Mercier; D. Benard	France	41	22	DSQ	27	40	110
42	Tornado	Franco Arditi; Giorgio Marra	Italy	50	45	32	31	32	110
43	Cheri II	Bruno Tomasoni; Bruno Dequal	Italy	36	39	39	42	34	110
44	Aloha VI	Yves Lorion; Rocco Jemma	France	52	17	51	50	35	95
45	Twinkle	J. Roy Mitchell; Jean Mitchell	Great Britain	34	49	37	38	49	93
46	Danaldo	P. Migliaccio; G. B. Leone	Italy	WDR	20	23	WDR	47	90
47	Tichiboo	Prince Bira; Guy Dagonnot	Thailand	WDR	42	44	36	33	85
48	Andiola	Gualtiero Corsi; S. Bugliani	Italy	46	28	45	52	48	81
49	Polluce II	Rob. Palombieri; Fr. Lapanje	Italy	22	34	DSQ	53	50	81
50	Nababbo II	Ott. Danelon; Ant. Martinoli	Italy	41	51	33	51	44	76
51	Asrid	C. Frugoli Jr. E. Amatuzzo	Italy	54	44	42	43	42	71
52	Fuzzy	George Dehio; Chr. Berglund	Sweden	51	53	46	41	38	71
53	Ito	L. Barbier; Fr. Carvallo	Brazil	43	46	50	40	WDR	61
54	Faneca	A. Bizzarro; A. Filippone	Italy	39	48	WDR	47	46	60
55	Guapa II	Mario Rivelli; R. Camardella	Italy	53	52	48	45	WDR	42
56	Mira II	Albino Gargiuli; A. Cicilisni	Italy	56	54	52	55	51	32
57	Furia	Gino Serafini; O. Raimondi	Italy	47	47	DSQ	DNF	DNF	26
58	Meteor	F. D. McCarthy; Al Bragdon	United States	WDR	56	53	54	DNF	17
59	Sabrina	Ottavio Puleo; M. Masturzo	Italy	55	WDR	DNS	DNS	DNS	5

Legend: DNF – Did not finish; DNS – Did not start; DSQ – Disqualified; WDR – Withdrew;
