= 1953 Star World Championship =

Event title
- Edition: 31st

Event details
- Venue: Naples, Italy
- Yachts: Star
- Titles: 1

Competitors
- Competitors: 80
- Competing nations: 13

Results
- (gold) Gold: (Italy) Straulino & Rode
- (silver) Silver: (Portugal) Bello & Tito
- (bronze) Bronze: (Italy) Nordio & Sangulin

The 1953 Star World Championship was held in Naples, Italy in 1953.

== Results ==
Results of individual races
| Pos | Boat name | Crew | Country | I | II | III | IV | V | Pts |
|---|---|---|---|---|---|---|---|---|---|
| Gold medal | Merope II | Agostino Straulino; Nicolò Rode | Italy | 1 | 1 | 11 | 1 | 3 | 188 |
| Silver medal | Faneca | Duarte de Almeida Bello; João Miguel Tito | Portugal | 2 | 3 | 10 | 5 | 1 | 184 |
| Bronze medal | Asterope | Tito Nordio; Livio Sangulin | Italy | 9 | 7 | 3 | 12 | 9 | 165 |
| 4 | Myra | Philippe Chancerel; C. Gueullette | France | 10 | 13 | 6 | 6 | 7 | 163 |
| 5 | Ma' Lindo | Mário Quina; Edgar Cruz | Portugal | 11 | 5 | 19 | 3 | 11 | 156 |
| 6 | Merope | Antonio Cosentino; Neri Stelle | Italy | 6 | 11 | 14 | 13 | 6 | 155 |
| 7 | Gem III | Durward Knowles; Sloane Farrington | Bahamas | 15 | 4 | 5 | 25 | 2 | 154 |
| 8 | Kurush IV | Carlos de Cárdenas; Carlos de Cárdenas Jr. | Cuba | 8 | 14 | 21 | 4 | 5 | 153 |
| 9 | Espadarte II | Joaquim Fiúza; Manuel Ricciardi | Portugal | 13 | 6 | 7 | 26 | 4 | 149 |
| 10 | Caprica | Roberto Ciappa; Carlo Rolandi | Italy | 16 | 8 | 16 | 2 | 18 | 145 |
| 11 | Vega IV | C. W. Lyon Jr. Nina Lyon | United States | 20 | 15 | 2 | 15 | 8 | 145 |
| 12 | Faneca | Mario Rivelli; G. Schettino | Italy | 14 | 9 | 8 | 8 | 27 | 139 |
| 13 | Vim | W. M. Shehan; D. Hubers | United States | 4 | 17 | 15 | 16 | 16 | 137 |
| 14 | Melody | Paul Smart; Jorge de Cárdenas | United States | 5 | 21 | 25 | 9 | 12 | 133 |
| 15 | Vega | Fred. Mercier; G. Pisani | France | 21 | 12 | 23 | 11 | 10 | 128 |
| 16 | Anna I | Carlo Boselli; Raffaele Manarea | Italy | 7 | DSQ | 1 | 24 | 13 | 119 |
| 17 | Candide | Albert Debarge; Noel Calonne | France | 3 | 10 | 27 | 7 | DSQ | 117 |
| 18 | Scylla | Charles Ulmer; Alvaro de Cárdenas | United States | 25 | 16 | 20 | 14 | 14 | 116 |
| 19 | Gloriana III | Ubaldo Fondi; Gennaro De Luca | Italy | 12 | 2 | 22 | 18 | WDR | 110 |
| 20 | Bellatrix II | Bruno Splieth; N. von Stempel | West Germany | 23 | 22 | 9 | 22 | 22 | 107 |
| 21 | Paka VI | Paul E. Fischer; H. J. Renken | West Germany | 18 | 24 | 13 | 17 | 28 | 105 |
| 22 | Perfidia III | H. Looser; H. Rusterholz | Switzerland | 22 | 18 | 18 | 23 | 20 | 104 |
| 23 | Xodo IV | Roberto Bueno; A. Torres | Brazil | 27 | 28 | 4 | 19 | 31 | 96 |
| 24 | Pedrito IV | Ernesto de Mendonca; F. Amorim | Portugal | 29 | 25 | 17 | 31 | 15 | 88 |
| 25 | Elletra | Aldo Moscovita; O. Danelon | Italy | 30 | 19 | DSQ | 10 | 24 | 81 |
| 26 | Fiadolin II | Dario Salata; O. Magnaghi | Italy | 17 | 34 | 12 | 20 | WDR | 81 |
| 27 | Ali Baba IV | Hans Bryner; Urs Bucher | Switzerland | 19 | 31 | 26 | 29 | 21 | 79 |
| 28 | Mari-Tim | Timoleon Razelos; Andreas Ziro | Greece | 26 | 27 | 28 | 28 | 25 | 71 |
| 29 | Eolo | S. di Maio; G. Sangiovanni | Italy | 33 | 23 | 24 | 30 | 30 | 65 |
| 30 | Blue Lei | J. Both; C. Joos | Switzerland | 24 | 20 | DSQ | 38 | 19 | 63 |
| 31 | Aloha V | Yves Lorion; J. Carabia | France | 28 | 29 | 34 | 21 | 32 | 61 |
| 32 | Mechtild | Josef Pankofer; M. Huber | West Germany | 36 | 33 | 29 | 35 | 17 | 55 |
| 33 | Susan | Ovidio Lagos; A. Vallebona | Argentina | 34 | 30 | 31 | 36 | 26 | 48 |
| 34 | Whirlpool | H. Day II; M. Gray | United States | 31 | 32 | 30 | 37 | 34 | 41 |
| 35 | Evita | C. Auteried; H. J. Wurmbock | Austria | 35 | 38 | 37 | 27 | 29 | 39 |
| 36 | Bufera | D. Milella; G. Modugno | Italy | 37 | 26 | 33 | 34 | 36 | 39 |
| 37 | Fiammetta | P. Migliaccio; G. Sartorio | Italy | 39 | 35 | 32 | 39 | 23 | 37 |
| 38 | Fiadolin I | P. Bela; L. Jolif | France | 32 | 37 | 35 | 32 | 33 | 36 |
| 39 | Bimba | M. Taylor; M. Taylor | Venezuela | 38 | 36 | 36 | 33 | 35 | 27 |
| 40 | Old Nut II | C. Henrion; F. Thieck | Brazil | DNS | DNS | 38 | 40 | 37 | 8 |

Legend: DNS – Did not start; DSQ – Disqualified; WDR – Withdrew;
