= 1954 Star World Championship =

Event title
- Edition: 32nd

Event details
- Venue: Cascais, Portugal
- Yachts: Star
- Titles: 1

Competitors
- Competitors: 68
- Competing nations: 13

Results
- (gold) Gold: (Cuba) de Cárdenas & de Cárdenas
- (silver) Silver: (The Bahamas) Knowles & Farrington
- (bronze) Bronze: (Italy) Straulino & Rode

The 1954 Star World Championship was held in Cascais, Portugal in 1954.

== Results ==
Results of individual races
Pos	Boat name	Crew	Country	I	II	III	IV	V	Pts
Gold medal	Kurush V	Carlos de Cárdenas; Carlos de Cárdenas Jr.	Cuba	1	1	1	2	1	169
Silver medal	Gem II	Durward Knowles; Sloane Farrington	Bahamas	6	5	2	3	4	155
Bronze medal	Merope II	Agostino Straulino; Nicolò Rode	Italy	2	4	4	10	5	150
4	Vega IV	C. W. Lyon Jr. Owen P. Merrill	United States	8	2	6	4	7	148
5	Kurush IV	Alvaro de Cárdenas; Jorge de Cárdenas	Cuba	5	3	11	5	3	148
6	Fanece	Duarte de Almeida Bello; João Miguel Tito	Portugal	3	16	3	1	12	146
7	Citation	William Parks; Robert Halperin	United States	15	9	5	8	2	136
8	Asterope	Tito Nordio; Livio Sangulin	Italy	9	6	7	14	11	128
9	Espedarte II	Joaquim Fiúza; Júlio Gourinho	Portugal	7	8	8	11	16	126
10	Paka VI	Paul E. Fischer; N. von Stempel	West Germany	16	10	13	9	10	117
11	Gam II	Philippe Chancerel; Michel Parent	France	4	WDR	9	7	6	116
12	Nuvola Rossa	Dario Salata; G. Barnao	Italy	19	19	12	13	8	104
13	Faneca	Mario Rivelli; R. Camardella	Italy	12	11	21	12	17	102
14	Xodo IV	Jorge Pontual; A. Torres	Brazil	DSQ	22	16	6	9	87
15	Vega VII	Fred. Mercier; G. Pisani	France	23	23	14	24	13	78
16	Katia II	Michel Gautier; Jean L. Domerc	Morocco	17	26	20	15	19	78
17	Myra II	Jean Peytel; G. de Montebello	France	20	20	19	17	23	76
18	Mari	Sune Carlsson; Olle Carlsson	Sweden	28	DSQ	15	16	14	67
19	Aloha VI	Yves Lorion; J. Hanin	France	13	12	17	–	–	63
20	Scylla	Charles Ulmer; C. R. Ulmer	United States	14	21	27	WDR	15	63
21	Luti	L. Roboredo; D. Roboredo	Portugal	18	21	24	21	25	62
22	Merope	Antonio Cosentino; Neri Stelle	Italy	11	7	26	DSQ	WDR	61
23	Anna I	Carlo Boselli; D. Massa	Italy	21	28	29	18	18	61
24	Petrea II	Peter Hansohm; D. Dotzer	West Germany	22	15	10	WDR	DNS	58
25	Melody	Paul Smart; P. G. Smart	United States	29	13	WDR	20	22	56
26	Candide	Ernesto de Mendonca; E. Cruz	Portugal	10	17	22	WDR	–	56
27	Gamm	S. H. N. Tay; Y. Aillou	Morocco	25	18	WDR	22	21	54
28	Twinkle	J. Mitchell; Mitchell	Great Britain	24	27	30	19	24	51
29	Rig II	M. Neiva; V. Demaison	Brazil	26	24	23	DSQ	20	47
30	Pilantra	Lotar de Druet; A. Ravazano	Brazil	30	14	18	WDR	WDR	43
31	Roux-Delimal	A. de Bokay; Damoiselle II Arcachon	France	27	29	28	23	27	41
32	Tichiboo	Prince Bira; Guy Dagonnot	Thailand	33	WDR	25	WDR	26	21
33	Itrane	C. Metral; F. Thieck	Morocco	31	WDR	WDR	25	–	14
34	Frisette	Robert Taylor; O. Ricupero	Argentina	32	WDR	–	–	–	3

Legend: DNS – Did not start; DSQ – Disqualified; WDR – Withdrew;
