= Sailing at the 1952 Summer Olympics – Star =

Sailing at the Olympics

Star at the Games of the XV Olympiad
- Medalists
- Venue: Harmaja
- Dates: 20–28 July
- Competitors: 42 from 21 nations
- Teams: 21

Medalists
1st place, gold medalist(s)		Agostino Straulino; Nicolò Rode	Italy
2nd place, silver medalist(s)		John Price; John Reid	United States
3rd place, bronze medalist(s)		Joaquim Mascarenhas de Fiúza; Francisco de Andrade	Portugal

The Star was a sailing event on the Sailing at the 1952 Summer Olympics program in Harmaja. Seven races were scheduled. 42 sailors, on 21 boats, from 21 nations competed.

== Results ==
Rank	Helmsman (Country)	Crew	Yachtname	Race I		Race II		Race III		Race IV		Race V		Race VI		Race VII		Total Points	Total -1
Rank	Helmsman (Country)	Crew	Yachtname	Rank	Points	Rank	Points	Rank	Points	Rank	Points	Rank	Points	Rank	Points	Rank	Points	Total Points	Total -1
1st place, gold medalist(s)	Agostino Straulino (ITA)	Nicolò Rode	Merope	~~2~~	~~1122~~	1	1423	2	1122	2	1122	1	1423	2	1122	1	1423	8757	7635
2nd place, silver medalist(s)	John Price (USA)	John Reid	Comanche	1	1423	7	578	1	1423	1	1423	3	946	1	1423	~~8~~	~~520~~	7736	7216
3rd place, bronze medalist(s)	Joaquim Fiúza (POR)	Francisco de Andrade	Espadarte	4	821	8	520	3	946	3	946	5	724	~~DNF~~	~~0~~	3	946	4903	4903
4	Carlos de Cárdenas Culmell (CUB)	Carlos de Cárdenas Plá	Kurush IV	5	724	~~12~~	~~344~~	4	821	4	821	6	645	3	946	7	578	4879	4535
5	Durward Knowles (BAH)	Sloane Elmo Farrington	Gem III	3	946	6	645	6	645	~~10~~	~~423~~	2	1122	7	578	9	469	4828	4405
6	Édouard Chabert (FRA)	Jean-Louis Dauris	Eissero VI	6	645	~~11~~	~~382~~	7	578	7	578	4	821	4	821	10	423	4248	3866
7	Bengt Melin (SWE)	Borje Carlsson	Lotta IV	7	578	~~9~~	~~469~~	5	724	5	724	9	469	9	469	4	821	4254	3785
8	Bob Maas (NED)	Eddy Stutterheim	Bem II	9	469	3	946	9	469	11	382	8	520	5	724	~~11~~	~~382~~	3892	3510
9	Hans Robert Bryner (SUI)	Kurt Bryner	Ali-Baba IV	13	309	2	1122	14	277	9	469	7	578	6	645	~~18~~	~~168~~	3568	3400
10	Douglas Woodward (CAN)	Andrew Hugessen	Whirlaway	12	344	13	309	11	382	~~16~~	~~219~~	10	423	13	309	2	1122	3108	2889
11	Paul Fischer (GER)	Claus Wunderlich	Paka V	8	520	10	423	~~DNF~~	~~0~~	14	277	DNF	0	10	423	5	724	2367	2367
12	Tacariju de Paula (BRA)	Cid de Oliveira Nascimento	Bu III	11	382	4	821	13	309	~~19~~	~~144~~	12	344	15	247	15	247	2494	2350
13	Stanley Potter (GBR)	Bruce Banks	Fortuna	15	247	5	724	~~DNF~~	~~0~~	20	122	15	247	17	193	6	645	2178	2178
14	Harald Musil (AUT)	Harald Fereberger	30. February	16	219	15	247	~~18~~	~~168~~	8	520	13	309	8	520	14	277	2260	2092
15	Timoleon Razelos (GRE)	Andreas Ziro	Marie-Tim	~~19~~	~~144~~	16	219	10	423	6	645	18	168	16	219	13	309	2127	1983
16	Jorge Emilio Brauer (ARG)	Alfredo Vallebona	Arcturus	10	423	19	144	~~DNF~~	~~0~~	13	309	11	382	11	382	17	193	1833	1833
17	Aleksandr Tshumakov (URS)	Konstantin Melgunov	Uragan	~~18~~	~~168~~	14	277	16	219	12	344	16	219	14	277	12	344	1848	1680
18	Barton Harvey (AUS)	Kevin Wilson	Hornet	14	277	~~20~~	~~122~~	8	520	18	168	19	144	12	344	20	122	1697	1575
19	Rene Israel Nyman (FIN)	Bror-Christian Ilmoni	Lucky Star	17	193	17	193	15	247	17	193	14	277	~~18~~	~~168~~	16	219	1490	1322
20	Mario Fafangel (YUG)	Karlo Bašić	Primorka	20	122	18	168	12	344	15	247	17	193	19	144	~~21~~	~~101~~	1319	1218
21	Victor de Sigaldi (MON)	Michel Auréglia	Hirondelle	~~DNF~~	~~0~~	DNF	0	17	193	21	101	DSQ	0	20	122	19	144	560	560

DNF = Did not finish, DNS= Did not start, DSQ = Disqualified
= Male, = Female

=== Daily standings ===
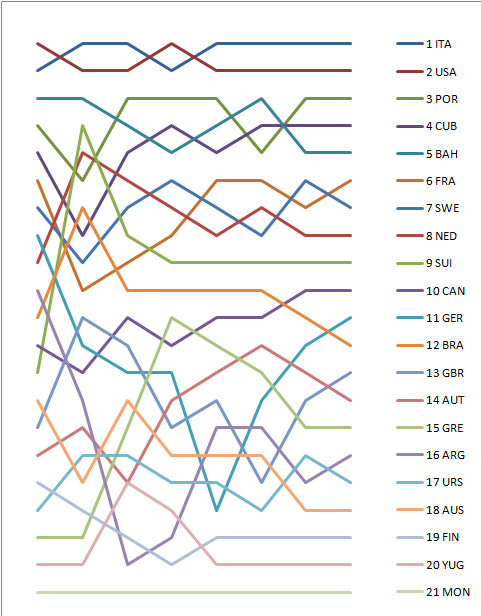
Graph showing the daily standings in the Star during the 1952 Summer Olympics

== Conditions at Harmaja ==
Of the total of three race area's only two were needed during the Olympics in Harmaja. Each of the classes was using the same scoring system.

Date	Race	Sky	Wind direction	Wind speed (m/s)
20 July 1952	I	Grand yachting weather	SW	6-7
21 July 1952	II	Calm sea, later rain	SW	1-2 later 6-7
22 July 1952	III	Magnificent seas	SW	10
23 July 1952	IV		Shifty	3-4
26 July 1952	V	Rainy	SW	3-6
27 July 1952	VI		SW	4-6
28 July 1952	VII	Fine and sunny	Shifty	Light
