= 1939 Star World Championship =

Event title
- Edition: 17th
- Host: Yacht-Club von Deutschland; Norddeutscher Regatta Verein

Event details
- Venue: Kiel, Germany
- Dates: 20–25 August 1939
- Yachts: Star

Competitors
- Competitors: 42
- Competing nations: 8

Results
- (gold) Gold: (Brazil) von Hütschler & Beyn
- (silver) Silver: (Italy) Straulino & Rode
- (bronze) Bronze: (Germany) Hansohm & Blankenburg

The 1939 Star World Championship was held in Kiel, Germany in 1939, organised by Yacht-Club von Deutschland and Norddeutscher Regatta Verein.

The championship regatta started on Sunday 20 August 1939. Walter von Hütschler and Edgar Beyn were the winners when the racing concluded the Friday after.

== Events ==
21 teams from 8 nations were present. Swedish boat Unn was sailed by Arvid Laurin and Alban Verne.

von Hütschler won the first race on Monday 21 August.

The crew of the Dutch boat Bem II, Henny Scholtz, was sent home for military duty and replaced. On Thursday 24 August, Dutch, French, and British crews were notified to return home by their consulates.

== Results ==
Results of individual races
Pos	Boat name	Crew	Country	I	II	III	IV	V	Tot
Gold medal	Pimm	Walter von Hütschler; Edgar Beyn	Brazil	1	5	1	3	1	99
Silver medal	Polluce	Agostino Straulino; Nicolò Rode	Italy	4	1	7	5	4	89
Bronze medal	Maggel	Peter Hansohm; Christian Blankenburg	Germany	2	6	20	1	6	75
4	Scout II	Milton Wegeforth; Barney Lehman	United States	5	2	5	17	7	74
5	Hasto	Joachim Weise; K. Weise	Germany	10	3	3	8	13	73
6	Spirit	Stan Ogilvy; T. Fairbanks	United States	3	7	2	10	15	73
7	Castore	Dario Salata; Luigi De Manincor	Italy	11	11	4	6	9	69
8	Pegasus	K. Koppenhagen; Karpf	Germany	8	14	11	7	3	67
9	Aloha	Yves Lorion; Armand Chatord	France	6	12	17	2	8	65
10	Bellona	Esterer; Kolbe	Germany	DSQ	8	10	4	2	64
11	Grunau	A. Gaedtke; Poppe	Germany	7	4	8	WDR	11	63
12	Albatross	Peltow; Kopinzsch	Germany	14	9	13	12	5	57
13	Stella Diana	Giuseppe Fago; V. Merani	Italy	9	13	16	13	16	43
14	Mona III	H. Gumprecht; S. Kerrison	Great Britain	16	10	9	11	DNS	42
15	Gloriana II	Mario Ducrot; Enrico Ducrot	Italy	12	WDR	19	9	10	38
16	Rhythm	J. Abberley; E. Seay	United States	13	16	21	14	14	32
17	Axilla	Tito Nordio; P. Mitis	Italy	18	WDR	12	15	17	26
18	Bem II	Bob Maas; Henny Scholtz	Netherlands	17	DSQ	6	WDR	DNS	21
19	Bremen	D. Albers; P. Rohland	Germany	15	DSQ	18	16	18	21
20	Perseus	Hissink; Bertelaman	Germany	WDR	DSQ	14	WDR	12	18
21	Unn	Arvid Laurin; Alban Verne	Sweden	WDR	15	15	WDR	DNS	14

Legend: DNS – Did not start; DSQ – Disqualified; WDR – Withdrew;
