= 1960 Star World Championship =

Event title
- Edition: 38th

Event details
- Venue: Rio de Janeiro, Brazil
- Dates: 1960
- Yachts: Star

Competitors
- Competitors: 92
- Competing nations: 11

Results
- (gold) Gold: (United States) North & Skahill
- (silver) Silver: (United States) Edler & Edler
- (bronze) Bronze: (United States) Lippincott & Hogg

The 1960 Star World Championship was held in Rio de Janeiro, Brazil in 1960.

== Results ==
Results of individual races
Pos	Boat name	Crew	Country	I	II	III	IV	V	Tot
Gold medal	North Star III	Lowell North; Thomas Skahill	United States	1	1	9	1	5	218
Silver medal	Deacon	Donald K. Edler; Kent D. Edler	United States	4	4	1	6	4	216
Bronze medal	Fierce	Robert Lippincott; Frank Hogg	United States	5	12	6	4	10	198
4	Dingo	Ding Schoonmaker; Read Ruggles	United States	17	2	5	5	9	197
5	Glider	Richard Stearns; Robert Halperin	United States	3	18	14	7	3	190
6	Esquire	Richard G. Hahn; Ted Munroe	United States	11	6	8	9	13	188
7	Chatterbox	Malin Burnham; Peter Peckham	United States	9	5	7	11	20	183
8	Pimm	Walter von Hütschler; Jorge Carneiro	Brazil	6	10	16	13	7	183
9	Ma' Lindo	Mário Quina; José Quina	Portugal	14	9	2	17	18	175
10	Malihini	Anson Beard Jr. Samuel Beard	United States	20	11	19	10	1	174
11	Illusion	Paul E. Fischer; Daniel Schwartz	West Germany	26	3	17	15	6	168
12	Faneca	Duarte de Almeida Bello; Oliveira	Portugal	21	7	21	14	12	160
13	Ninotchka	Jorge Pontual; Cid Nascimento	Brazil	13	15	13	19	16	159
14	Ouija	John Scarborough; Frank Caraher	United States	10	23	25	8	15	154
15	Clementine	Harry Adler; Luiz Ramos	Brazil	12	DNF	3	3	19	151
16	Ta Fatt V	Jacob Engwall; Arne Åkerson	Sweden	15	19	28	18	11	144
17	Lindoya	Charles W. Lyon Jr. Frank Lyon	United States	19	13	11	26	23	143
18	Shandon	E. W. Etchells; Mary Etchells	United States	2	40	DNF	2	2	142
19	Clambambes V	Peter Adolff; Jurgen Adolff	West Germany	16	20	15	16	27	141
20	Creepy II	Foster Clarke; David Kelley	Bahamas	27	14	10	20	26	138
21	Espadarte	Joaquim Fiúza; Manuel Ricciardi	Portugal	7	22	33	21	22	130
22	Crocus	Howard Lippincott; Kitchenman	United States	18	26	18	31	14	128
23	Twinkle	Roberto Mieres; Víctor Fragola	Argentina	31	16	22	23	21	122
24	Sirene	Kenneth Smith; Gerald K. Swanton	United States	8	8	39	22	DNF	111
25	Bu	Roberto Bueno; Carlos Cairo	Brazil	24	43	4	25	28	111
26	Mechtild	Josef Pankofer; Franz Heilmeier	West Germany	DNF	29	24	27	8	100
27	Nuvola Rossa	Dario Salata; Luigi Croce	Italy	23	24	26	32	33	97
28	Hokunani	Harry C. Uhler; Robert Hiatt	United States	25	35	20	28	32	95
29	Susan II	Dieter Laubmann; Karl H. Laubmann	West Germany	29	21	27	36	29	93
30	Xodo	Michel Gautier; Fernand Thieck	Morocco	DSQ	30	12	12	DNF	87
31	Fram III	Ernst Gautschi; Christa Gautschi	Switzerland	28	33	36	30	24	84
32	Flamingo IV	Paul C. Woodbury; Axel Schmidt	United States	DNF	25	DNF	24	17	75
33	Chamakina	Carlos Braniff; Antonio Recamier	Mexico	30	32	34	34	30	75
34	Pukki III	F. Posser de Andrade; Carlos A. de Britto	Portugal	33	31	23	40	34	74
35	No Izquierdo	Charles H. Dole; Richard Carpenter	United States	DSA	34	29	29	25	71
36	Noni	A. Mardel Correia; Henrique Hall	Portugal	22	17	DSA	DSQ	31	71
37	Gamine	Edmund Daser; Pauline Daser	Switzerland	DNF	28	32	37	35	56
38	Mariang	Hector Schenone; Arnoldo Pekelharing	Argentina	36	38	31	39	DSA	44
39	March Hare	James O. Jones; Tacariju de Paula	United States	DNF	27	30	DNF	DSA	37
40	Nippe	Jan Dellborg; Gernard Hobohm	Sweden	34	36	35	DSQ	DNS	36
41	Arrayan III	Jose Zambruni; Roberto Travesaro	Argentina	32	41	41	42	DSA	32
42	Covunco IV	Ovidio Lagos; Jorge Curutchet	Argentina	DNF	39	38	35	DNS	29
43	Spook	Herb Witte; Gerd Schroeder	Italy	35	44	DSQ	33	DNF	29
44	Malabar	Henrique H. Fischer; Barborsich	Brazil	DNF	37	37	38	DNF	29
45	Cordobes	Alfredo Macchiavelli; Carlos Terragno	Argentina	DNF	42	40	DSA	DNS	12
46	Greta II	Nicholas S. Pexider; Joao J. Anger	Brazil	DSQ	45	DSQ	41	DNS	8

Legend: DNF – Did not finish; DSA – Disabled; DSQ – Disqualified; WDR – Withdrew;
