= Sailing at the 1964 Summer Olympics – Star =

Sailing at the Olympics

Star at the Games of the XVIII Olympiad
- Venue: Enoshima
- Competitors: 34 from 17 nations
- Teams: 17

Medalists
1st place, gold medalist(s)		Durward Knowles; Cecil Cooke	Bahamas
2nd place, silver medalist(s)		Richard Stearns; Lynn Williams	United States
3rd place, bronze medalist(s)		Pelle Pettersson; Holger Sundström	Sweden

The Star was a sailing event on the Sailing at the 1964 Summer Olympics program in Enoshima. Seven races were scheduled. 34 sailors, on 17 boats, from 17 nations competed.

== Results ==
Results of individual races
Pos	Sail no.	Boat name	Crew	Country	I		II		III		IV		V		VI		VII		Tot	Pts
Pos	Sail no.	Boat name	Crew	Country	Pos	Pts	Pos	Pts	Pos	Pts	Pos	Pts	Pos	Pts	Pos	Pts	Pos	Pts	Tot	Pts
Gold medal	BA–4789	Gem	Durward Knowles; Cecil Cooke	Bahamas	1	1331	5	632	DNF	101^{†}	6	553	1	1331	1	1331	7	486	5765	5664
Silver medal	US–4841	Glider	Richard Stearns; Lynn Williams	United States	7	486	8	428^{†}	1	1331	2	1030	3	854	3	854	2	1030	6013	5585
Bronze medal	S–4704	Humbug V	Pelle Pettersson; Holger Sundström	Sweden	9	377	10	331^{†}	2	1030	1	1331	2	1030	2	1030	4	729	5858	5527
4	L–4779	Squid III	Peter Tallberg; Henrik Tallberg	Finland	2	1030	4	729	3	854	4	729	4	729	8	428^{†}	1	1331	5830	5402
5	SR–4773	Taifun	Timir Pinegin; Fyodor Shutkov	Soviet Union	3	854	1	1331	DNF	101^{†}	5	632	10	331	4	729	8	428	4406	4305
6	G–4871	Bellatrix XIII	Bruno Splieth; Karsten Meyer	United Team of Germany	5	632	3	854	4	729	3	854	6	553^{†}	6	553	6	553	4728	4175
7	KC–4736	Glisten	Dave Miller; William West	Canada	4	729	14	185^{†}	5	632	8	428	11	290	5	632	3	854	3750	3565
8	P–3870	Faneca	Duarte de Almeida Bello; Fernando Pinto Coelho Bello	Portugal	6	553	2	1030	DNF	101^{†}	9	377	7	486	12	252	5	632	3431	3330
9	Z–4627	Ali-Baba IX	Hans Bryner; Urs-Ulrich Bucher	Switzerland	12	252	7	486	DSQ	0^{†}	7	486	8	428	10	331	9	377	2360	2360
10	KA–3922	Maryke	Martinus Visser; Thomas Owens	Australia	8	428	16	127	DNF	101^{†}	10	331	5	632	7	486	12	252	2357	2256
11	BL–3910	Clementine V	Harry Adler; Luiz Ramos	Brazil	10	331	6	553	DNF	101^{†}	12	252	9	377	9	377	10	331	2322	2221
12	A–4582	Rampage	Roberto Sieburger; Arnoldo Pekelharing	Argentina	14	185	15	155	6	553	16	127^{†}	12	252	13	218	15	155	1645	1518
13	J–4332	Mita II	Masayuki Ishii; Takafumi Okubo	Japan	15	155	11	290	7	486	13	218	13	218	16	127	DSQ	0^{†}	1494	1494
14	MX–4858	Nausikaa 4	Carlos Braniff; Andrés Gerard Sr.	Mexico	11	290	9	377	DNF	101^{†}	15	155	16	127	14	185	11	290	1525	1424
15	I–4484	Umberta V	Luigi Croce; Luigi Saidelli	Italy	13	218	12	252	DNF	101^{†}	11	290	15	155	11	290	13	218	1524	1423
16	V–4906	Espuma del Mar	Daniel Camejo Octavio; Juan Feld	Venezuela	16	127^{†}	13	218	8	428	14	185	14	185	15	155	14	185	1483	1356
17	CA–4143	Gyoshu II	An Dandara; Kim Tal	Cambodia	17	101	DNF	101	DNS	0^{†}	DNS	0	DNS	0	DNS	0	DNS	0	202	202

Legend: DNF – Did not finish; DNS – Did not start; DSQ – Disqualified; † – Discarded race not counted in the overall result;
Gender: – male; – female;

=== Daily standings ===
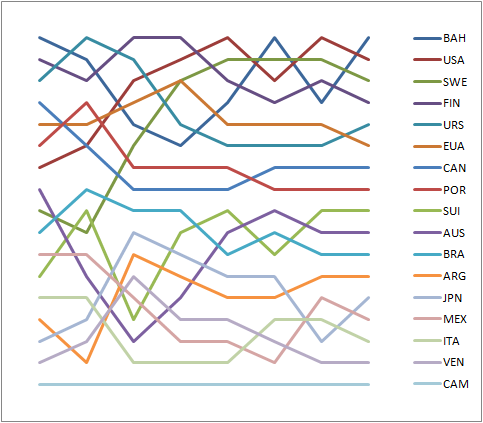
Graph showing the daily standings in the Star during the 1964 Summer Olympics

== Conditions at Enoshima ==
Of the total of three race areas were needed during the Olympics in Enoshima. Each of the classes was using the same scoring system. The Westerly course area was used for the Star.

Date	Race	Weather	Wind direction	Wind speed (m/s)
12 October 1964	I	Cloudy	E	3
13 October 1964	II	Cloudy	NE	3.8
14 October 1964	III	Cloudy	N	14
15 October 1964	IV	Fine	NNE	10
19 October 1964	V	Fine	NNE	9
20 October 1964	VI	Cloudy	N	5
21 October 1964	VII	Cloudy	SW	8
