= 1971 Star World Championship =

Event title
- Edition: 48th

Event details
- Venue: Seattle
- Yachts: Star
- Titles: 1

Competitors
- Competitors: 98
- Competing nations: 7

Results
- (gold) Gold: USA Conner & Reynolds
- (silver) Silver: USA North & Barrett
- (bronze) Bronze: SWE Albrechtson & Tell

The 1971 Star World Championship was held in Seattle, United States in 1971.

== Results ==
Results of individual races
Pos	Boat name	Crew	Country	I	II	III	IV	V	Tot
Gold medal	Menace	Dennis Conner; James Reynolds	United States	5	2	6	6	6	225
Silver medal	Something Else	Lowell North; Peter Barrett	United States	3	12	5	7	2	221
Bronze medal	Contact	John Albrechtson; Göran Tell	Sweden	18	8	1	3	9	211
4	Frolic	Bill Buchan Jr. Carl F. Sutter	United States	15	7	13	5	3	207
5	Blott XIII	Stig Wennerström; Sture Christensson	Sweden	13	23	2	4	4	204
6	Spirit	Alan C. Holt; James McCulloch	United States	10	11	4	9	18	198
7	Humbug VII	Pelle Petterson; Stellan Westerdahl	Sweden	1	20	9	12	14	194
8	Dingo	Ding Schoonmaker; Douglas Knight	United States	DSQ	5	3	2	1	189
9	Liberty	William F. Gerard; Sheridah Gerard	United States	2	4	20	29	8	187
10	SusanIV	Jörg Bruder; Eduardo de Souza	Brazil	4	38	10	1	10	187
11	Good Grief!	Tom Blackaller; Gary Mull	United States	23	15	8	16	12	176
12	Blue Peter	Steve Haarstick; Chris Gould	United States	11	26	16	14	19	164
13	Ibis	John W. Bennett; Carl Blomquist	United States	9	DNF	11	13	7	160
14	Rats	Evan Dailey; Michael Cooper	United States	14	9	35	17	21	154
15	Zig Zag	Frank Zagarino; Larry Suter	United States	21	1	21	24	36	147
16	Windy	Jay C. Winberg; Charles Beard	United States	28	3	23	21	28	147
17	Sashay	Thomas Oller; Alan Lechner	United States	43	31	14	8	13	141
18	Wild Thing	Durward Knowles; Monty Higgs	Bahamas	12	32	7	DNF	11	138
19	Big If	Thompson Adams; William Richards	United States	7	19	18	DNF	20	136
20	Riot IV	Henry M. Rowan; Delmar R. Dhein	United States	16	34	28	11	25	136
21	Misty	John W. Allen; Ken Himelright	United States	25	25	15	20	29	136
22	Solution	Malin Burnham; John Burnham	United States	8	24	19	DNF	16	133
23	D. H. Growler	Barton S. Beek; Charles Beek	United States	29	18	29	19	30	125
24	Ragamuffin	Larry Whipple; Carl Pollard	United States	31	14	33	32	17	123
25	Streaker	Allen Mitchell; Ron Anderson	United States	33	33	27	DNF	5	122
26	Bounty IV	Mario Innecco; Murilo Barges	Brazil	17	40	12	25	35	121
27	Swingin' Star	Donald J. Trask; Greg Long	United States	34	43	22	10	23	118
28	Shady	Charles H. Dole; Arthur Silcox	United States	37	21	25	27	22	118
29	Gambler	Thomas Dudinsky; Andrew Macdonald	United States	19	33	39	22	24	113
30	Aquarius	S. Prinsenberg; Dirk Prinsenberg	Canada	39	16	32	23	31	109
31	Super Rat	Read Ruggles; David Dickey	United States	6	10	DSQ	DNF	26	108
32	Hush	William S. Toft; Ronald S. Toft	Australia	24	27	31	26	34	108
33	Zucker Kaninchen	Chuck Lewsadder; William Munster	United States	22	37	WDR	15	27	99
34	R R	Richard Gates; David Tillson	United States	41	6	24	DNF	37	92
35	Quest	Colin Smith; Wallace Crump	United States	20	29	36	34	42	89
36	Shadow II	James Allsopp; Kevin Douglas	United States	27	17	17	DNF	DNF	89
37	Frolic	J. M. MacCausland; George Szabo Jr.	United States	26	28	40	30	40	86
38	Darshan	William J. Hock; Don Sutherland	Australia	40	44	26	18	39	83
39	Dick Tracy	Richard Lippincott; Jim Lippincott	United States	30	36	43	28	33	80
40	Good News	William Cowles; L. Ralph Smith	United States	35	46	42	DNF	15	62
41	Flim Flam	Roberto Mieres; Rolando Lythgoe	Argentina	38	30	41	31	43	67
42	Y	Stanley Leibel; Tony Lorch	Canada	36	42	30	DNF	32	60
43	Spankuk	Chresten Jensen; Walter Myer	United States	44	45	34	33	38	56
44	Ultimate	James Lippincott; Robert Flower	United States	32	41	44	36	41	56
45	Magic	Robert Rodgers; Rollie Kolb	United States	45	DNF	38	35	45	37
46	Figaro	Richard Miller; Dean Miller	United States	46	22	45	DNF	DNS	37
47	April II	John Decker; Andrew Roost	United States	42	35	37	DNF	DNS	36
48	Pepper	William Kieser Jr. Ernest Hildner	United States	48	39	46	DNS	44	23
49	Gnat	Nat Fowler; John McGann	United States	47	47	47	DNF	DNF	9

Legend: DNF – Did not finish; DNS – Did not start; DSQ – Disqualified; WDR – Withdrew;
