= 1965 Star World Championship =

Event title
- Edition: 43rd
- Host: Newport Harbor Yacht Club

Event details
- Venue: Newport Harbor
- Yachts: Star
- Titles: 1

Competitors
- Competitors: 70
- Competing nations: 8

Results
- (gold) Gold: (United States) Bever & Lewsadder
- (silver) Silver: (United States) Burnham & Reynolds
- (bronze) Bronze: (United States) Buchan & Knight

The 1965 Star World Championship was host by the Newport Harbor Yacht Club based in Newport Beach, California, United States in 1965.

== Results ==
Results of individual races
Pos	Boat name	Crew	Country	I	II	III	IV	V	Tot
Gold medal	Mache	Donald Bever; Charles Lewsadder	United States	5	1	4	2	1	167
Silver medal	Chatterbox	Malin Burnham; James Reynolds	United States	3	4	1	4	4	164
Bronze medal	Frolic	Bill Buchan Jr. Douglas Knight	United States	1	3	5	3	7	161
4	Turmoil	Gary Comer; William D. Bennett	United States	2	11	3	9	2	153
5	Ariel	Alan C. Holt; William Murray	United States	12	10	12	1	6	139
6	North Star	Lowell North; Robert Andre	United States	10	2	9	6	17	136
7	Scandale	John Albrechtson; Göran Tell	Sweden	16	8	2	12	8	134
8	Big Daddy	Donald K. Edler; William Twist Jr.	United States	4	5	6	31	3	131
9	Pimm	Walter von Hütschler; Arnaldo Lopes	Brazil	8	17	13	7	18	117
10	Swingin' Star	Donald J. Trask; Donald Coleman	United States	9	13	24	5	16	113
11	Kutuka III	W. E. Richter; Roberto da Rosa	Brazil	19	9	16	10	14	112
12	Blatt VIII	Stig Wennerström; Jan Lybeck	Sweden	15	14	19	11	10	111
13	Envy	Kevin Jaffe; Skip Allan	United States	11	7	22	14	15	111
14	Tranquilizer	John W. Bennett; Lester Laddon	United States	21	12	7	18	21	101
15	Star of the Sea	Fritz Riess; Joseph Duplin	West Germany	6	DNF	11	8	19	100
16	Tsunami	Anson Beard Jr. Gilbert Kennedy	United States	17	23	10	21	12	97
17	Nhycusa	William P. Ficker; Donald Wattson	United States	26	16	14	22	5	97
18	Paula	Thomas Tranfaglia; Gerard Donovan	United States	13	24	15	25	11	92
19	Faneca	Duarte de Almeida Bello; Fernando Bello	Portugal	DNF	6	8	16	26	88
20	Ninotchka	Peter D. Siemsen; Gastão Brun	Brazil	7	28	17	16	25	84
21	Quasar	Watt Webb; Alfred Jaretzki IV	United States	32	19	27	15	13	74
22	Glisten	William G. Burgess; Gerd Howaldt	Canada	14	22	25	28	20	71
23	Bagace	Charles W. Lyon Jr. Frank Lyon	United States	23	DNF	20	23	9	69
24	Needle	Johm K. Todd; John Trinter	United States	27	20	21	20	24	68
25	Conqueror	William F. Gerard; Sheridah Gerard	United States	25	26	30	13	23	63
26	Illusion	Paul E. Fischer; Kai Krüger	West Germany	18	25	26	26	30	57
27	Ballad	Robert H. Hall; John I. Straus	United States	30	15	29	26	28	52
28	Caprice	William Pickford; C. de W. Rollins	United States	24	27	31	17	32	49
29	October	Eugene T. McCarthy; Charles Kotovic	United States	20	31	32	27	22	48
30	Azulao	Harry W. Walker; J. Rutledge Delgado	Brazil	DNF	18	18	34	27	47
31	Magic	Robert A. Rodgers; Allan J. MacKay	United States	28	21	23	30	34	44
32	Surprise	Jack T. Rickard; Stephen L. Martin	United States	22	29	28	33	33	35
33	Nausikaa IV	Carlos Braniff; Javier Velasquez	Mexico	29	30	33	32	31	25
34	Pacific	Kazuaki Kaido; Kenichi Suzuki	Japan	31	32	34	29	DNF	18
35	Flim Flam	Patrick Flammia; George Yule	United States	DNF	33	35	35	29	12

Legend: DNF – Did not finish;
