= Sailing at the 1948 Summer Olympics – Star =

Sailing at the Olympics

Star at the Games of the XIV Olympiad
- Gold medalist
- Venue: Torbay
- Dates: 3–12 August
- Competitors: 47 from 17 nations
- Teams: 17

Medalists
| 1st place, gold medalist(s) | | Hilary Smart; Paul Smart | United States |
| 2nd place, silver medalist(s) | | Carlos de Cárdenas; Carlos de Cárdenas Jr. | Cuba |
| 3rd place, bronze medalist(s) | | Bob Maas; Edward Stutterheim | Netherlands |

The Star was a sailing event on the Sailing at the 1948 Summer Olympics program in Torbay. Seven races were scheduled. 47 sailors, on 17 boats, from 17 nations competed.

== Results ==
| Rank | Helmsman (Country) | Crew | Boat | | | Race I | | Race II | | Race III | | Race IV | | Race V | | Race VI | | Race VII | | Total Points | Total -1 |
| Rank | Helmsman (Country) | Crew | Sail No. | Colour | Name | Rank | Points | Rank | Points | Rank | Points | Rank | Points | Rank | Points | Rank | Points | Rank | Points | Total Points | Total -1 |
|---|---|---|---|---|---|---|---|---|---|---|---|---|---|---|---|---|---|---|---|---|---|
| 1st place, gold medalist(s) | Hilary Smart (USA) | Paul Smart | 2570 | Blue | Hilarious | 4 | 729 | 1 | 1331 | 2 | 1030 | 1 | 1331 | 3 | 854 | ~~DSQ~~ | ~~0~~ | 6 | 553 | 5828 | 5828 |
| 2nd place, silver medalist(s) | Carlos de Cárdenas (CUB) | Carlos de Cárdenas Jr. | 2376 | Green | Kurush III | 7 | 486 | ~~DSQ~~ | ~~0~~ | 7 | 486 | 2 | 1030 | 7 | 486 | 1 | 1331 | 2 | 1030 | 4849 | 4849 |
| 3rd place, bronze medalist(s) | Bob Maas (NED) | Eddy Stutterheim | 1655 | White | Starita | 3 | 854 | 5 | 632 | 5 | 632 | 3 | 854 | 4 | 729 | 2 | 1030 | ~~7~~ | ~~486~~ | 5217 | 4731 |
| 4 | Durward Knowles (GBR) | Sloane Elmo Farrington | 1976 | Red | GEM II | 2 | 1030 | 2 | 1030 | 6 | 553 | 4 | 729 | 2 | 1030 | ~~DSQ~~ | ~~0~~ | DNF | 0 | 4372 | 4372 |
| 5 | Agostino Straulino (ITA) | Nicolò Rode | 1663 | Red | Legionario | 1 | 1331 | 3 | 854 | 3 | 854 | ~~DSQ~~ | ~~0~~ | 1 | 1331 | DSQ | 0 | DNF | 0 | 4370 | 4370 |
| 6 | Joaquim Fiúza (POR) | Júlio Gourinho | 2554 | Red | Espadarte | 11 | 290 | 6 | 553 | 1 | 1331 | 5 | 632 | ~~12~~ | ~~252~~ | 5 | 632 | 3 | 854 | 4544 | 4292 |
| 7 | Jock Sturrock (AUS) | Len Fenton | 1722 | Light Blue | Moorina | ~~DNF~~ | ~~0~~ | 4 | 729 | 15 | 155 | 6 | 553 | 10 | 331 | 4 | 729 | 1 | 1331 | 3828 | 3828 |
| 8 | Bill Gooderham (CAN) | Gerald Fairhead | 1343 | White | Ariel | 9 | 377 | ~~14~~ | ~~185~~ | 4 | 729 | 13 | 217 | 8 | 428 | 6 | 553 | 10 | 331 | 2820 | 2635 |
| 9 | José Luis Allende (ESP) | Eduardo Aznar; José María Alonso | 2738 | White | Galerna | ~~15~~ | ~~155~~ | 7 | 486 | 16 | 127 | 9 | 377 | 5 | 632 | 7 | 486 | 8 | 428 | 2691 | 2564 |
| 10 | Georgios Kalambokidis (GRE) | Khristoforos Karolou; Kharalambos Potamianos; Nikolaos Vlangalis | 1617 | Light Green | Nephos I | 8 | 428 | ~~12~~ | ~~252~~ | 9 | 377 | 11 | 290 | 10 | 331 | 9 | 377 | 4 | 729 | 2784 | 2532 |
| 11 | Yves Lorion (FRA) | A. Chatord; J. Laverne; Jean Peytel | 2368 | Light Green | Aloha II | 12 | 252 | 8 | 428 | 8 | 428 | ~~DSQ~~ | ~~0~~ | 6 | 553 | 3 | 854 | DNF | 0 | 2515 | 2515 |
| 12 | René Israel Nyman (FIN) | Bror-Christian Ilmoni | 1797 | Varnished | Lucky Star | ~~13~~ | ~~217~~ | 11 | 290 | 13 | 217 | 12 | 252 | 9 | 377 | 11 | 290 | 5 | 632 | 2275 | 2058 |
| 13 | Georg Obermüller (AUT) | Hans Schachinger; G. Werner; Horst Obermüller | 2704 | Varnished | Donar III | 10 | 331 | ~~15~~ | ~~155~~ | 14 | 185 | 14 | 185 | 15 | 155 | 8 | 428 | 9 | 377 | 1816 | 1661 |
| 14 | João José Bracony (BRA) | Carlos Melo Bittencourt Filho; E. Rocco de Paula Simoes; M. Rocco de Paula Simoes | 2613 | White | Buscape II | ~~16~~ | ~~127~~ | 13 | 217 | 11 | 290 | 10 | 331 | 14 | 185 | 10 | 331 | 11 | 290 | 1771 | 1644 |
| 15 | Hans Bryner (SUI) | A. L. Albrecht; Kurt Bryner; R. A. Rhyner | 2564 | Yellow | Ali Baba II | 6 | 553 | 9 | 377 | 12 | 252 | 8 | 428 | ~~DSQ~~ | ~~0~~ | DNF | 0 | DNS | 0 | 1610 | 1610 |
| 16 | Jorge Piacentini (ARG) | Ángel Carrasco; Hipólito Ezequiel Gil Elizalde | 1911 | Blue | Acturus | 14 | 185 | 10 | 331 | 10 | 331 | 7 | 486 | 13 | 217 | ~~DNF~~ | ~~0~~ | DNS | 0 | 1550 | 1550 |
| 17 | Bengt Melin (SWE) | C. Edding; Yngve Engkvist; Sven Rinman | 1798 | Blue | Lotta IV | 5 | 632 | ~~DNS~~ | ~~0~~ | 17 | 101 | 15 | 155 | DSQ | 0 | DNF | 0 | DNS | 0 | 888 | 888 |

DNF = Did not finish, DNS= Did not start, DSQ = Disqualified
= Male, = Female

=== Daily standings ===
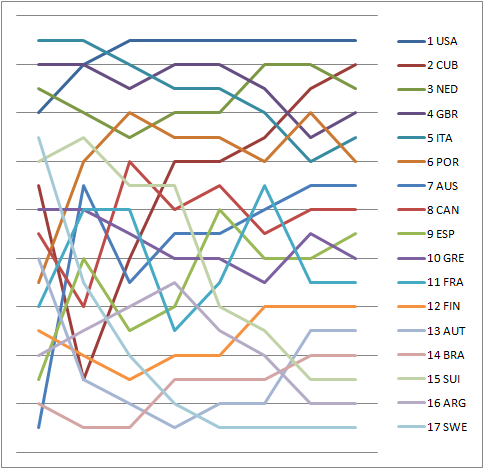
Graph showing the daily standings in the Star during the 1948 Summer Olympics

== Courses at Torbay ==
A total of three race area's was positioned by the Royal Navy in Torbay. Each of the classes was using the same kind of course and the same scoring system.
