= Duarte Manuel Bello =

Portuguese sailor (1921–1994)

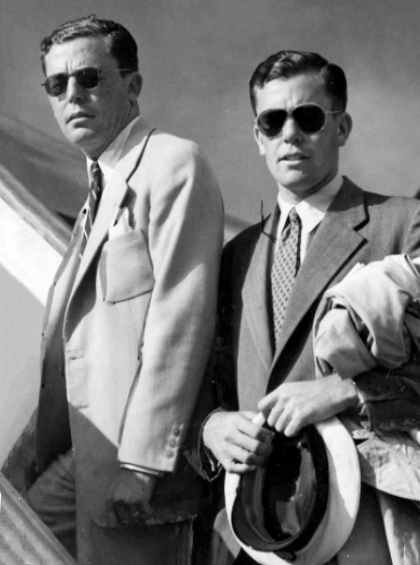
- Duarte and Fernando Bello in 1948

Personal information
- Full name: Duarte Manuel de Almeida Bello
- Nationality: Portuguese
- Born: 26 July 1921 Maputo, Mozambique
- Died: 3 June 1994 (aged 72) Lisbon, Portugal
- Height: 174 cm (5 ft 9 in)
- Weight: 89 kg (196 lb)
Medal record
Sailing
Representing Portugal
Olympic Games
Silver medal – second place	1948 London	Swallow
Star World Championships
Bronze medal – third place	1952 Cascais, Portugal	Faneca
Silver medal – second place	1953 Napoli, Italy	Faneca
Silver medal – second place	1962 Cascais, Portugal	Faneca

Duarte Manuel de Almeida Bello (26 July 1921 – 3 June 1994) was a Portuguese sailor who competed at the 1948, 1952, 1956, 1960 and 1964 Olympics. He won a silver medal in the Swallow class in 1948, together with his brother Fernando Pinto Coelho Bello, and placed fourth in 1952 and 1956.

Bello also raced Star class keelboats, winning silver medals at the 1953 and 1962 World Championship, and a bronze in 1952. He was known as an equipment innovator who invented several devices, including automatic "Bello bailers" in 1954, and the circular boom-vang track at the early 1960s.

== Early childhood ==
Duarte was born in colonial Maputo to Duarte Mendes de Almeida Bello and Maria do Pilar Pinto Coelho on 26 July 1921. Through a clerical error, the M which should have been Mendes as per his father became Manuel.

At 7 years of age his family moved back to Portugal, where he began sailing the Sharpie.

In 1943, he married Maria Antonia Carneiro Bustorff Silva, daughter of one of Portugal's most prominent lawyers of the time, as well as a sailor. He was a Civil Engineer by education and worked in the national rail line Comboios de Portugal.

== Olympic and World Championships ==
- 1947 Star World Championships – 10th place (with F. Bello)
- 1948 Star World Championships – 5th place (with F. Bello)
- 1948 Olympics – Swallow – Silver Medal (with F. Bello)
- 1951 Star World Championships – 9th place (with F. Bello)
- 1952 Star World Championships – Bronze (with F. Bello)
- 1952 Olympics – 5.5 Metre – 4th (with F. Bello & Júlio Gourinho)
- 1953 Star World Championships – Silver (with João Miguel Tito)
- 1954 Star World Championships – 6th place (with J. Tito)
- 1955 Star World Championships – 9th place (with J. Silva)
- 1956 Star World Championships – 7th place (with J. Silva)
- 1956 Olympics – Star – 4th place (with José Bustorff Silva)
- 1957 Star World Championships – 28th place (with M. Ricciardi)
- 1960 Star World Championships – 12th place (with Oliveir)
- 1960 Olympics – 5.5 Metre – 16th place (with Fernando Bello & J. Gourinho)
- 1962 Star World Championships – Silver (with F. Bello)
- 1963 Star World Championships – 27th place (with F. Bello)
- 1964 Olympics – Star – 8th place (with F. Bello)
- 1965 Star World Championships – 19th place (with F. Bello)
- 1966 Star World Championships – 41st place (with Antonio Rocha)
- 1972 Star World Championships – 31st place (with Manuel Espirito Santo)
- 1973 Star World Championships – 26th place (with Duke Robinson)
- 1974 Star World Championships – 18th place (with F. Bello)
- 1983 Star World Championships – 65th place (with Rui Roque de Pinho)
- 1986 Star World Championships – 70th place (with Fernando B. Bello)
