= Samuel Beard =

Samuel or Sam Beard may refer to:

- Samuel Beard (public servant) (born 1939), co-founder and president of the Jefferson Awards for Public Service
- Sam Beard (born 1990), New Zealand rugby player
- Samuel Beard (sailor) in 1960 Star World Championships
