= Andrés Gerard =

Andrés Gerard can refer to:

- Andrés Gerard Sr. (1924–2012), Mexican Olympic sailor
- Andrés Gerard Jr. (born 1949), Mexican Olympic sailor
