= 1974 Star World Championships =

The 1974 Star World Championships were held in Laredo, Spain in 1974.

== Results ==
Results of individual races
Pos	Boat name	Crew	Country	I	II	III	IV	V	VI	Tot
Gold medal	Swift	Tom Blackaller (H); Ron Anderson	United States	2	1	2	2	4	-	249
Silver medal	Humbug XVIII	Pelle Petterson (H); Ingvar Hansson	Sweden	1	2	3	6	5	-	243
Bronze medal	Gem	Durward Knowles (H); Gerald Ford	Bahamas	9	3	5	1	6	-	236
4	Oat Willie	Larry Whipple (H); James Alexander	United States	3	6	15	3	22	2	231
5	Mahayana	Kim Fletcher (H); William Kreysler	United States	8	7	4	9	DNF	4	228
6	Moira	Uwe von Below (H); Bunte	West Germany	11	14	7	7	11	24	210
7	Romeo	Josi Steinmayer (H); Osterwald	West Germany	19	16	19	12	2	3	208
8	Nate	Heinz Nixdorf (H); Josef Pieper	West Germany	22	9	6	30	1	16	206
9	Goldfever	Sune Carlsson (H); Carlsson	Sweden	16	8	11	11	8	-	206
10	Flying Star VIII	Lars Berg (H); Richard Berg	Sweden	13	11	9	10	13	17	204
11	Bounty IV	Danielo Folli (H); Battista	Italy	5	24	8	15	17	14	201
12	Colomba VI	A. Osterwalder (H); Brack	Switzerland	32	13	13	16	19	1	198
13	Simba VI	Heinz Maurer (H); Meier	Switzerland	DNF	4	20	13	9	20	194
14	Murkel	Hartmut Voigt (H); Hans Juergen Duggen	West Germany	20	15	16	14	3	21	192
15	Shark	William Parks (H); Jim Machin	United States	6	22	-	8	23	10	191
16	Vindio	Fernando Pombo (H); José Benavides	Spain	26	35	26	4	7	11	186
17	Penelope	Peter Wyss (H); Vorberg	Switzerland	10	23	12	25	10	19	184
18	Noni	Duarte de Almeida Bello (H); Fernando Bello	Portugal	12	20	21	23	12	13	182
19	Fiamma	Mario Innecco (H); Peter Erzberger	Brazil	28	10	17	32	15	23	167
20	Harlekin	Gerd Schmidt-Claasen (H); Schmidt-Claasen	West Germany	30	18	14	26	16	27	159
21	Lario XXII	Mario Caprile (H); Felipe I. Liron	Spain	43	27	10	36	21	9	157
22	Roberta II	Davide Sigurta (H); Marco Colombo	Italy	21	25	29	22	-	8	155
23	Fiamma	Oskar A. Meier (H); Marcel Wunderli	Switzerland	4	19	-	19	18	-	148
24	Subbnboana	Eckart Wagner (H); Moeckl	West Germany	-	5	1	5	-	-	145
25	Tante	Ed Hengstenberg (H); Heiner Fahnenstich	West Germany	23	17	25	40	14	-	141
26	Suleika	Hannes Gubler (H); Spelbrink	Switzerland	17	21	28	29	25	-	140
27	Petnic	Hannes Schwarz (H); Peter Stinglwagner	West Germany	14	-	-	17	20	22	138
28	Nadeje	Karel Rezanka (H); Stucklin	Switzerland	18	31	27	41	29	18	137
29	El-Cha	Max Juchli (H); Beat Schmuck	Switzerland	-	28	22	47	24	6	133
30	Zirocco	Jonas Hamberg (H); Hamberg	Sweden	34	36	32	24	33	5	132
31	Shiny Two	William Hock (H); Vick	Australia	27	46	30	33	34	7	129
32	Schmacbatz	Roberto Mieres (H); Luthgoe	Argentina	40	12	18	20	-	-	118
33	Kille-Kille	Detlef Kuke (H); Ricken	West Germany	15	32	23	21	-	-	117
34	Solveig	Neil McConagby (H); Rawn	United States	29	26	-	34	28	26	117
35	Sweet Liza	Horst Miethe (H); Schlosser	West Germany	38	41	24	44	30	12	115
36	Follow Me	Joseph M. Ellis (H); Gaether	United States	24	33	-	18	26	-	109
37	Annalisa III	F. Greppi (H); Vago	Italy	36	42	38	43	32	15	97
38	Sadika	Peter Metzner (H); Ruh	Brazil	7	30	-	27	-	-	92
39	Aiolos II	Hans Jeschki (H); Lehrer	Austria	31	44	33	39	27	-	86
40	Arlu VII	Nanni Porro (H); Peona	Italy	25	40	-	37	-	25	81
41	Lausbub	Martin Schwieger (H); Moller	West Germany	35	34	34	31	-	-	74
42	Butzi	Rainer R. Roellenbleg (H); Zapomuel	West Germany	-	29	31	28	-	-	68
43	Elgan	Luis Roboredo (H); Tito Roboredo	Portugal	39	37	37	42	37	-	68
44	Geisha IV	Wolfgang Creutz (H); Mathias Wahl	West Germany	42	39	35	49	31	-	64
45	Samurai	Michael Young (H); Dawson	Australia	41	43	36	48	36	-	56
46	Delfin III	Rudolf Lange (H); Karl Heitzinger	Austria	37	-	-	35	35	-	49
47	Prinzeschen II	Richard Hillmer (H); Rottger	Netherlands	33	-	-	38	-	-	33
48	Made in Sweden	Gunnar Dahl (H); Dahl	Sweden	44	45	40	-	-	-	27
49	V.l.P.	Steve Gennow (H); Evans	United States	45	47	39	50	-	-	27
50	Dominique	Rene Luedi (H); Meier	Switzerland	-	38	-	45	-	-	21
51	Lario IX	Pascual Caprile (H); Caprile	Spain	-	-	-	46	-	-	6

Legend: DNF – Did not finish;
