= Richard Gates =

Richard or Rick Gates may refer to:

- Richard Gates (sailor) (born 1943)
- Rick Gates (Internet pioneer) (born 1956)
- Rick Gates (political consultant) (born 1972)
- Ricky Gates, train engineer
