= Fairhead =

Fairhead is a surname and may refer to:

- Gerry Fairhead, Canadian former sailor who competed in the 1948 Summer Olympics
- Rona Fairhead, Chair of the BBC Trust
- Charlie Fairhead, character from the UK TV series Casualty, played by Derek Thompson

See also

Fair Head, a headland in County Antrim, United Kingdom.
