= Jan Maas =

Jan Maas can refer to:

- Jan Maas (cyclist, born 1900) (1900–1977), Dutch cyclist
- Jan Maas (cyclist, born 1996), Dutch cyclist
- Jan Maas (sailor) (1911–1962), Dutch sailor
- Jan Maas, a fictional footballer in the TV series Ted Lasso
