= John Reid (sailor) =

American sailor

Personal information
- Full name: John Sidney Reid
- Born: November 27, 1918 Atlanta, Georgia, U.S.
- Died: May 17, 1954 (aged 35) Miami, Florida, U.S.

Sailing career
- Sport: Sailing
- Class: Star
Medal record
Men's sailing
Representing United States
Olympic Games
Silver medal – second place	1952 Helsinki	Star class

John Sidney Reid (November 27, 1918 – May 17, 1954) was an American competitive sailor and Olympic medalist. He won a silver medal in the Star class at the 1952 Summer Olympics in Helsinki, together with John Price.
