= James Reynolds (sailor) =

American sailor

James "Jim" Reynolds is an American sailor in the Star class. He won the 1971 Star World Championships together with Dennis Conner and finished 2nd in the 1965 Star World Championships together with Malin Burnham.

James Reynolds is the father of Mark Reynolds.
