= Takafumi Okubo =

Japanese sailor

Personal information
- Nationality: Japanese
- Born: 1 January 1942 (age 83)

Sport
- Sport: Sailing

Takafumi Okubo (born 1 January 1942) is a Japanese sailor. He competed in the Star event at the 1964 Summer Olympics.
