= James B. Hill =

American inventor (1856–1945)

James B. Hill (born November 29, 1856, near Fremont, Sandusky County, Ohio, died in 1945 in Raceland, Louisiana) was an American inventor.

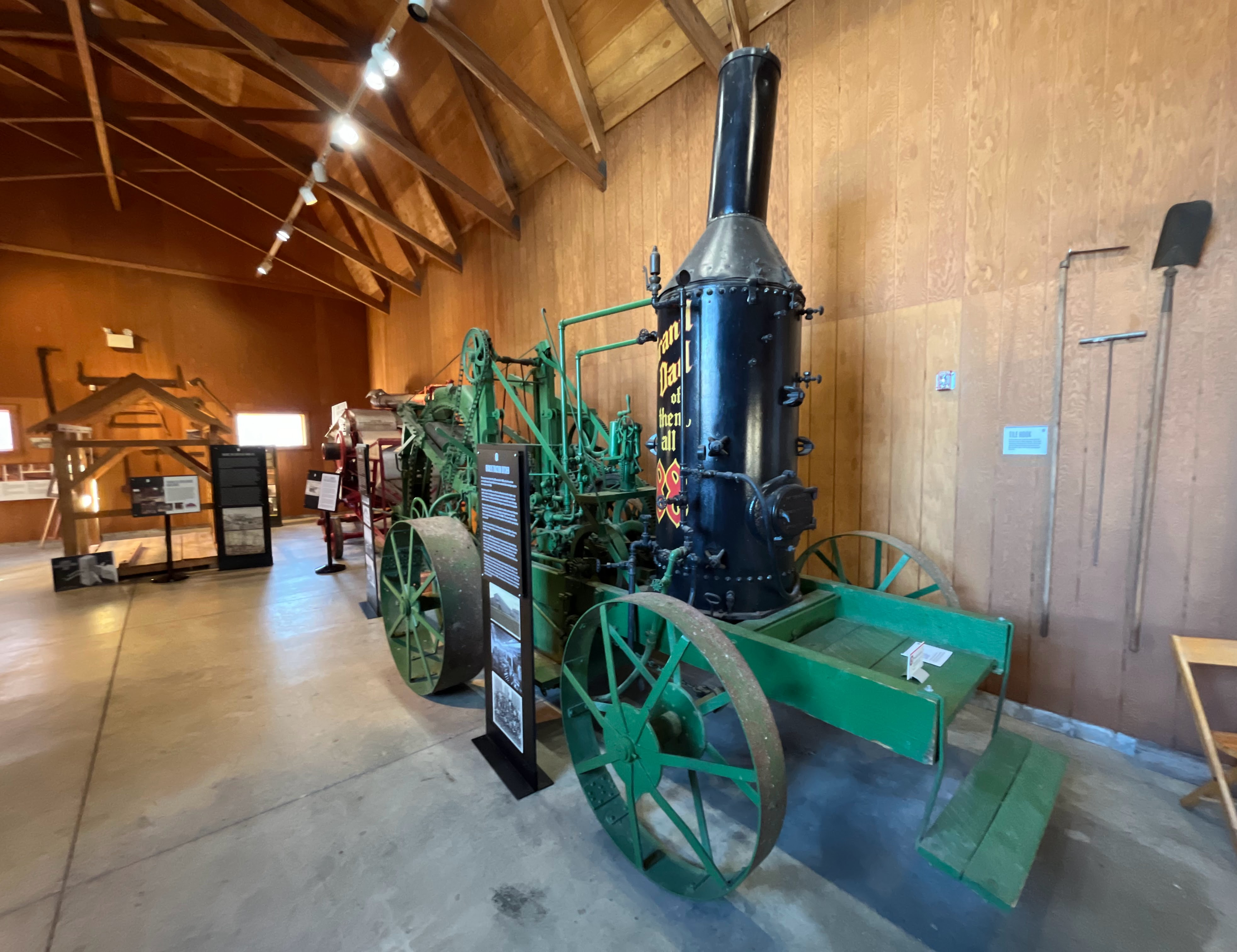
A 1902 Buckeye Traction Ditcher on display at the Hancock Historical Museum.

Hill worked as a drainage tiler in northwestern Ohio in the 1870s and 1880s, during which time he devised a wheel trencher that he later named the Buckeye Traction Ditcher (U.S. Patent 523-790; July 31, 1894). The Buckeye allowed for the quick placement of drainage tiles to aid in cultivation. After ridding northwest Ohio of its Great Black Swamp, Hill’s invention, produced by the Buckeye Traction Ditcher Company of Findlay, Ohio, went on to drain large parts of Florida and Louisiana.

Finding his early machines bogged down by the mud of Louisiana, Hill designed wheels that could travel over soft, wet earth. He termed this style of wheel "apron traction", and it became the forerunner for modern tank wheels (U.S. Patent 866-647; September 24, 1907 ).

Hill spent his last years breeding new varieties of corn which could flourish in Louisiana, most notably "Hill’s White Cob Yellow Dent". While visiting business associates in Florida at the turn of the 20th century, Hill designed an early amphibious vehicle.

The American Society of Mechanical Engineers designated an original Buckeye Steam Traction Ditcher as an "International Historic Mechanical Engineering Landmark" in 1988. This ditcher can be seen today at the Hancock County Historical Museum in Findlay. The ASME also maintains Hill's gravestone at Maple Grove Cemetery in Findlay, on which a ditcher is engraved.

== Family ==
Hill and his first wife Ella MacDonald had 10 children. Near his death, he boasted of having more than 100 descendants. These descendants are scattered throughout the United States, with the majority living in southern Louisiana (centering on Raceland) and northwest Ohio (centering on Toledo).

He also married Elizabeth Christian (her 3rd marriage) in Raceland, Louisiana. His son, Cloyse Adrian (aka Butch), married Elizabeth's daughter, Ada Jurgens. They had 2 children: Wayne and Arta Hill.
