= Andrew Hugessen =

Canadian sailor

Personal information
- Born: 30 June 1926 Montreal, Quebec, Canada
- Died: 5 December 2008 (aged 82) Westmount, Quebec, Canada

Sport
- Sport: Sailing

Andrew Hugessen (30 June 1926 – 5 December 2008) was a Canadian sailor. He competed in the Star event at the 1952 Summer Olympics.
