= An Dandara =

Cambodian sailor

Personal information
- Nationality: Cambodian
- Born: 8 April 1940 (age 86)

Sport
- Sport: Sailing

An Dandara (born 8 April 1940) is a Cambodian sailor. He competed in the Star event at the 1964 Summer Olympics.
