= George Calambokidis =

Greek sailor

Georgios Kalampokidis
Personal information
- Nationality: Greek

Sport
- Sport: Sailing

George Calambokidis (Greek: Γεώργιος Καλαμποκίδης) was a Greek sailor. He competed in the Star event at the 1948 Summer Olympics.
