= Alfredo Vallebona =

Argentine sailor

Personal information
- Born: 9 February 1926; Buenos Aires, Argentina
- Died: 15 February 1967 (aged 41); Buenos Aires, Argentina

Sport
- Sport: Sailing

Alfredo Vallebona (9 February 1926 – 15 February 1967) was an Argentine sailor. He competed in the Star event at the 1952 Summer Olympics.
