= Barton Harvey =

Australian sailor

Personal information
- Nationality: Australian
- Born: 13 February 1922
- Died: 29 February 2008 (aged 86)

Sport
- Sport: Sailing

Barton Harvey (13 February 1922 – 29 February 2008) was an Australian sailor. He competed in the Star event at the 1952 Summer Olympics.
