= Christoforos Karolou =

Greek sailor

Personal information
- Nationality: Greek
- Born: 1901 Athens, Greece

Sport
- Sport: Sailing

Christoforos Karolou (born 1901, date of death unknown) was a Greek sailor. He competed in the Star event at the 1948 Summer Olympics.
