= Michel Auréglia =

Monegasque sailor (1912–1978)

Personal information
- Nationality: Monegasque
- Born: 16 May 1912; Monaco
- Died: 18 October 1978 (aged 66); Monaco

Sport
- Sport: Sailing

Michel Antoine Michel Auréglia (16 May 1912 – 18 October 1978) was a Monegasque sailor. He competed in the Star event at the 1952 Summer Olympics.
