= Édouard Chabert =

French sailor

Personal information
- Nationality: French
- Born: 29 November 1902; Marseille, France
- Died: 25 November 1995 (aged 92); Marseille, France

Sport
- Sport: Sailing

Édouard Chabert (29 November 1902 – 25 November 1995) was a French sailor. He competed in the Star event at the 1952 Summer Olympics.
