= José María Alonso (sailor) =

Spanish sailor

Personal information
- Nationality: Spanish
- Born: 31 January 1915 Bilbao, Spain

Sport
- Sport: Sailing

José María Alonso (born 31 January 1915, date of death unknown) was a Spanish sailor. He competed in the Star event at the 1948 Summer Olympics.
