= Lynn Williams (sailor) =

American sailor

Personal information
- Full name: Lynn Alfred Williams III
- Nationality: American
- Born: June 29, 1939 (age 87) Evanston, Illinois, U.S.
- Height: 189 cm (6 ft 2 in)
- Weight: 93 kg (205 lb)

Sailing career
- Sport: Sailing
- Club: Chicago Yacht Club
- Class: Star
Medal record
Sailing
Representing United States
Olympic Games
Silver medal – second place	1964 Tokyo	Star class

Lynn Alfred "Lindsay" Williams III (born June 29, 1939) is an American competitive sailor and Olympic medalist. He won a silver medal in the Star class at the 1964 Summer Olympics in Tokyo, together with Richard Stearns.

Williams was born in Evanston, Illinois.
