= Kevin Wilson (sailor) =

Australian sailor (born 1927)

Personal information
- Nationality: Australian
- Born: 15 December 1927 Merri-bek, Melbourne, Australia
- Died: 16 August 2024 (aged 96)

Sport
- Sport: Sailing

Kevin Robert Wilson (15 December 1927 – 16 August 2024) was an Australian sailor. He competed in the Star event at the 1952 Summer Olympics. He was a member of the Royal Brighton Yacht Club for 80 years.
