= Charalampos Potamianos =

Greek sailor

Personal information
- Nationality: Greek
- Born: 1906 Argostoli, Greece
- Died: 30 August 2009 (aged 103)

Sport
- Sport: Sailing

Charalampos Potamianos (1906 – 30 August 2009) was a Greek sailor. He competed in the Star event at the 1948 Summer Olympics.
