= Victor de Sigaldi =

Monegasque sailor (1892–1968)

Personal information
- Nationality: Monegasque
- Born: 27 February 1892; Monaco
- Died: 23 June 1968 (aged 76); Monaco

Sport
- Sport: Sailing

Victor de Sigaldi (27 February 1892 – 23 June 1968) was a Monegasque sailor. He competed in the Star event at the 1952 Summer Olympics.
