= Karlo Bašić =

Croatian sailor (1911–2000)

Personal information
- Nationality: Croatian
- Born: 15 September 1911; Mali Lošinj, Austria-Hungary
- Died: 5 May 2000 (aged 88); New York, New York, United States

Sport
- Sport: Sailing

Karlo Bašić (15 September 1911 – 25 May 2000) was a Croatian sailor. He competed in the Star event at the 1952 Summer Olympics.
