= Jean-Louis Dauris =

French sailor

Personal information
- Nationality: French
- Born: 27 January 1920; Marseille, France
- Died: 2 October 1996 (aged 76); Marseille, France

Sport
- Sport: Sailing

Jean-Louis Dauris (27 January 1920 – 2 October 1996) was a French sailor. He competed in the Star event at the 1952 Summer Olympics.
