= 1964 Star World Championship =

Event title
- Edition: 42nd
- Host: Cottage Park Yacht Club

Event details
- Venue: Boston, United States
- Yachts: Star
- Titles: 1

Competitors
- Competitors: 110
- Competing nations: 7

Results
- (gold) Gold: (United States) Edler & Edler
- (silver) Silver: (United States) Duplin & Dolan
- (bronze) Bronze: (United States) Burnham & Lewsadder

The 1964 Star World Championship was held in Boston, USA in 1964, organised by the Cottage Park Yacht Club.

== Results ==
Results of individual races
Pos	Boat name	Crew	Country	I	II	III	IV	V	Tot
Gold medal	Big Daddy	Donald K. Edler; Kent D. Edler	United States	1	2	3	6	6	262
Silver medal	Star of the Sea	Joe Duplin; Francis Dolan	United States	2	7	13	3	1	254
Bronze medal	Chatterbox	Malin Burnham; Charles Lewsadder	United States	16	1	1	5	3	254
4	Turmoil	Gary Comer; William Bennett	United States	7	25	2	1	5	240
5	Mache	Donald Bever; J. Sharpnack	United States	3	9	28	4	10	226
6	Tranquilizer	John W. Bennett; Mickey Shanahan	United States	5	15	9	23	2	226
7	Cirrus	Howard Lippincott; Tupper Hale	United States	26	3	8	15	7	221
8	Shanachie	E. W. Etchells; Anson Beard Jr.	United States	10	10	5	26	11	218
9	North Star	Lowell North; Barton S. Beek	United States	6	11	21	13	13	217
10	Creepy III	Foster Clarke; Gerald Donovan	Bahamas	4	12	6	14	28	216
11	Bergerac	Joseph Burbeck; Nick Orr	United States	13	14	24	10	4	215
12	Puck IV	Gerd Fischer; Dirk Springorum	West Germany	12	17	7	16	18	210
13	Blade	Robert Lippincott; Walter Flynn	United States	8	8	18	17	19	210
14	October	Eugene T. McCarthy; Carl F. Morey	United States	11	19	19	7	17	207
15	Desiree	Herbert Hild; James Egan	United States	24	22	11	8	9	206
16	Blott VII	Stig Wennerström; Bernt Larsson	Sweden	15	5	4	27	30	199
17	Tackless	John Goddard; Paul Woodbury	United States	9	6	14	31	31	189
18	Big Blue	Richard Stearns; Robert Halperin	United States	28	4	WDR	2	14	176
19	Magic	Robert Rodgers; Allan J. MacKay	United States	19	30	15	11	37	168
20	Lucky Liz II	Fritz Riess; Eberhard Hoenigl	West Germany	17	36	25	29	12	161
21	Flapper	W. Shehan; Tom Stevens	United States	18	47	12	25	20	158
22	Flame	Stan Ogilvy; Peter Levinson	United States	23	21	35	18	25	158
23	Wolf II	Robert Wilson; Robert Sexauer	United States	14	46	22	24	22	152
24	Pirate	Jack Stewart; Dan Lee	United States	53	13	10	45	8	151
25	Super Rat	Read Ruggles; David Dickey	United States	37	16	16	34	26	151
26	Crackerjack	Alfred Jaretzki III; Alfred Jaretzki IV	United States	25	18	39	9	38	151
27	Pink Lady	Robert O'Neil; Jerome Leterman	United States	20	20	27	40	29	144
28	Snow Goose	W. Castle Jr. Robert Castle	United States	35	39	33	21	21	131
29	Vengeance	Wm. Gentzlinger; W. Blackman	United States	21	WDR	20	28	27	128
30	Scotch	Thomas Hislop; Asa L. Colson	United States	34	DNS	23	19	24	124
31	Jan	Florus Black; Robert Black	United States	44	26	26	37	23	124
32	Tijuca	Charles W. Lyon Jr. Frank Lyon	United States	27	23	DNF	12	46	120
33	Mate	Willard Hodges; David V. Black	United States	33	31	32	22	45	116
34	Chuckle	Harold Halsted; Peter Rankin	United States	50	28	31	41	15	115
35	Blue Chip II	David Gaillard; Harvey Lekson	United States	42	27	41	20	36	114
36	Aquarius	Mead Batchelor; William Sumner	United States	41	24	17	30	DNF	112
37	Finale	Richard Miller; Joseph L. Ehle	United States	31	33	40	39	35	102
38	Finesse	Michael Flynn; G. Flynn	United States	30	32	30	36	WDR	96
39	Lynx	Ernest Hanmer; Lois K. Hanmer	United States	40	34	38	38	34	96
40	White Star	Max Kastinger; H. Kastinger	Austria	36	35	46	35	33	95
41	Surprise	Jack T. Rickard; Mark Swartout	United States	43	DNF	34	33	32	82
42	Warhawk IV	William Seaman; W. Brandstatter	United States	39	45	43	32	44	77
43	Daemon	David Millar; P. van Buskirk	Canada	38	29	DSQ	42	39	76
44	Candide	Albert Debarge; J. de Bokay	France	47	38	29	WDR	41	69
45	Alvo	Charles H. Dole; William Froome	United States	49	41	DNF	49	16	69
46	Cirrus	P. Sullivan Jr. E. C. Mosmann	United States	32	37	42	46	WDR	67
47	Northern Light	Michael Purtell; Wade Badger	United States	22	DNS	50	44	45	63
48	Caramba	William Kieser Jr. Carolyn Kieser	United States	46	43	37	50	48	56
49	Wham Bam II	C. McCormick; John McCormick	United States	51	48	44	43	40	54
50	Bobolink II	Edward Braddock; L. Nelson Jr.	United States	48	40	45	51	43	53
51	Patricia	R. Hutchinson; R. Hutchinson	United States	45	51	48	47	47	53
52	Astronaut	Ralph W. Earl; Susan Earl	United States	54	44	36	48	WDR	42
53	Gee Whiz	Stephen Warren; Anne C. Warren	United States	52	50	48	52	49	29
54	Sunba	David Miller; William Mahy	Canada	29	DSA	DNS	DNS	DNS	27
55	Scamper	Rob McGoldrick; Kenneth Adams	United States	55	49	49	DSA	DNS	15

Legend: DNF – Did not finish; DSA – Disabled; DSQ – Disqualified; WDR – Withdrew;
