= Kim Tal =

Cambodian sailor

Personal information
- Nationality: Cambodian
- Born: 21 October 1940 (age 85)

Sport
- Sport: Sailing

Kim Tal (born 21 October 1940) is a Cambodian sailor. He competed in the Star event at the 1964 Summer Olympics.
