= Hancock Historical Museum =

Museum in Findlay, Ohio

Coordinates: 41.0374°N 83.6561°W

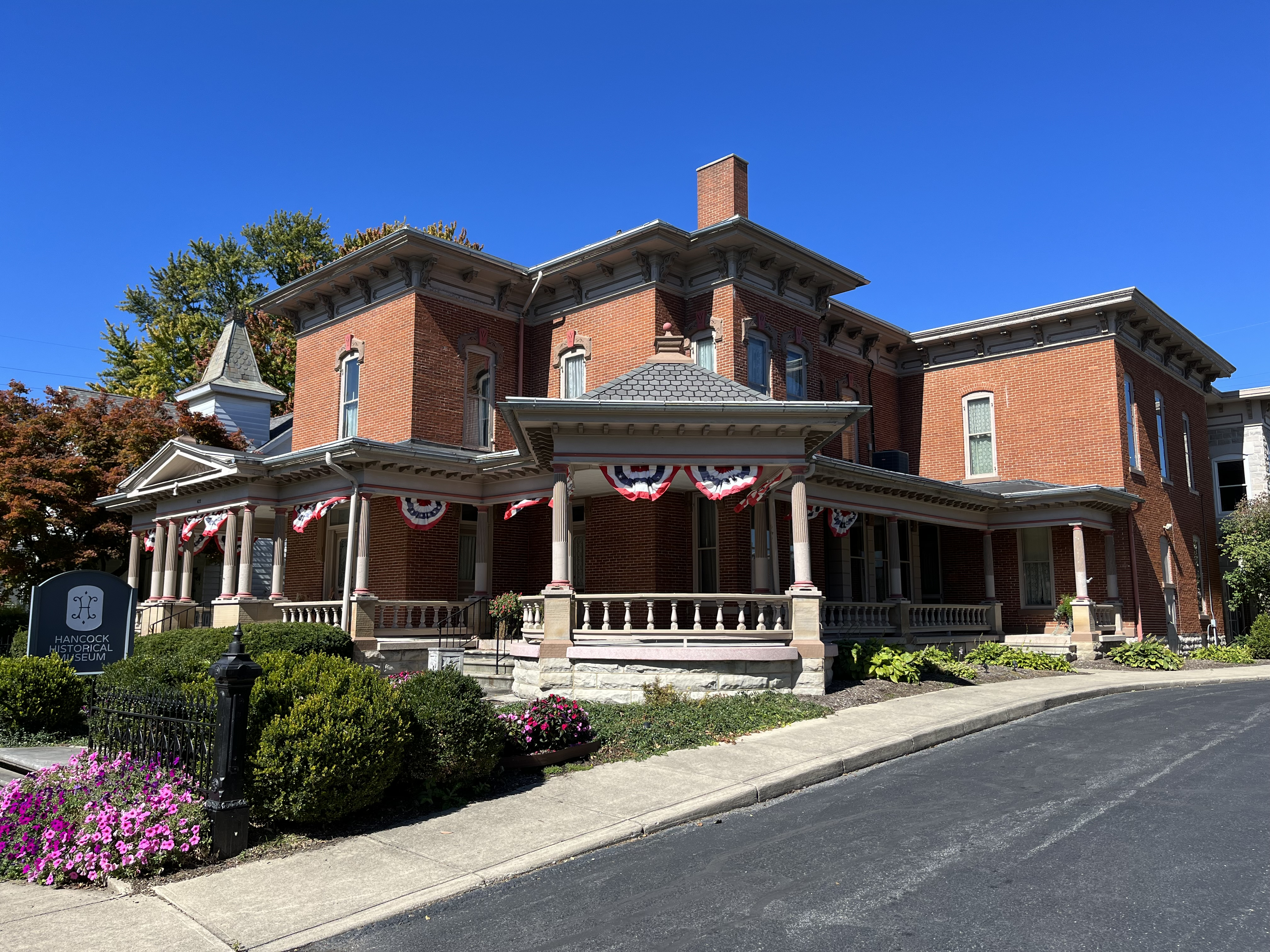
- The Hull-Flater House
- Former name: Hull-Flater House
- Established: 1970
- Location: 422 West Sandusky Street Findlay, Ohio
- Type: History of Ohio

The Hancock Historical Museum is a museum in Findlay, Ohio dedicated to the preservation of the history of Hancock County, Ohio. It is a non-profit, privately funded museum located in the Hull-Flater House at 422 West Sandusky Street and is a member of the Ohio Local History Alliance.

== History ==
The Hancock Historical Museum was founded in 1970 and opened to the public in 1971. In 1972, the Little Red Schoolhouse was donated to the museum and was restored by the retired teacher's organization. A 1985 addition to the Sandusky Street property created additional exhibition and meeting space, as well as a barn on the property. The Crawford Log House and the Davis Homestead were then both moved to the site. Past events have included Historic Barn Tours, which highlight local barns that date from the 1850s to early 1900s. In recent years, the museum has worked collaboratively with the University of Findlay on an agricultural heritage project, which was funded by a grant from the Ohio Humanities Council.

== Collection ==
=== Sandusky Street Campus ===
The museum's campus on Sundusky Street includes the Hull-Flater House, which is a seventeen-room, two-story Victorian house that was built around 1881. Much of the home is furnished as it would have been when it was first constructed, including parlors, bedrooms, and playrooms. The Crawford Log House, which was originally built in Biglick Township, the Davis Homestead, which was constructed in 1842, and the De-Wald Funk House, built in the 1860s, are all on the property.

The Hancock Historical Museum's permanent exhibits include items from the Gas and Oil Boom of the 1880s, Findlay Glass, the Civil War, and World War II. A barn behind the Hull-Flater House displays exhibits about agricultural life and transportation in Hancock County. Other exhibits of regional interest, such as social life in Hancock County and Findlay business, are featured as rotating exhibits. The museum also maintains substantial archives, which are made available to the public for research during museum business hours.

Buckeye Steam Traction Ditchers were the first successful trenching machines used for laying drainage tile. The museum's ditcher was designated an International Historical Mechanical Engineering Landmark by the American Society for Mechanical Engineers.

=== The Little Red Schoolhouse ===
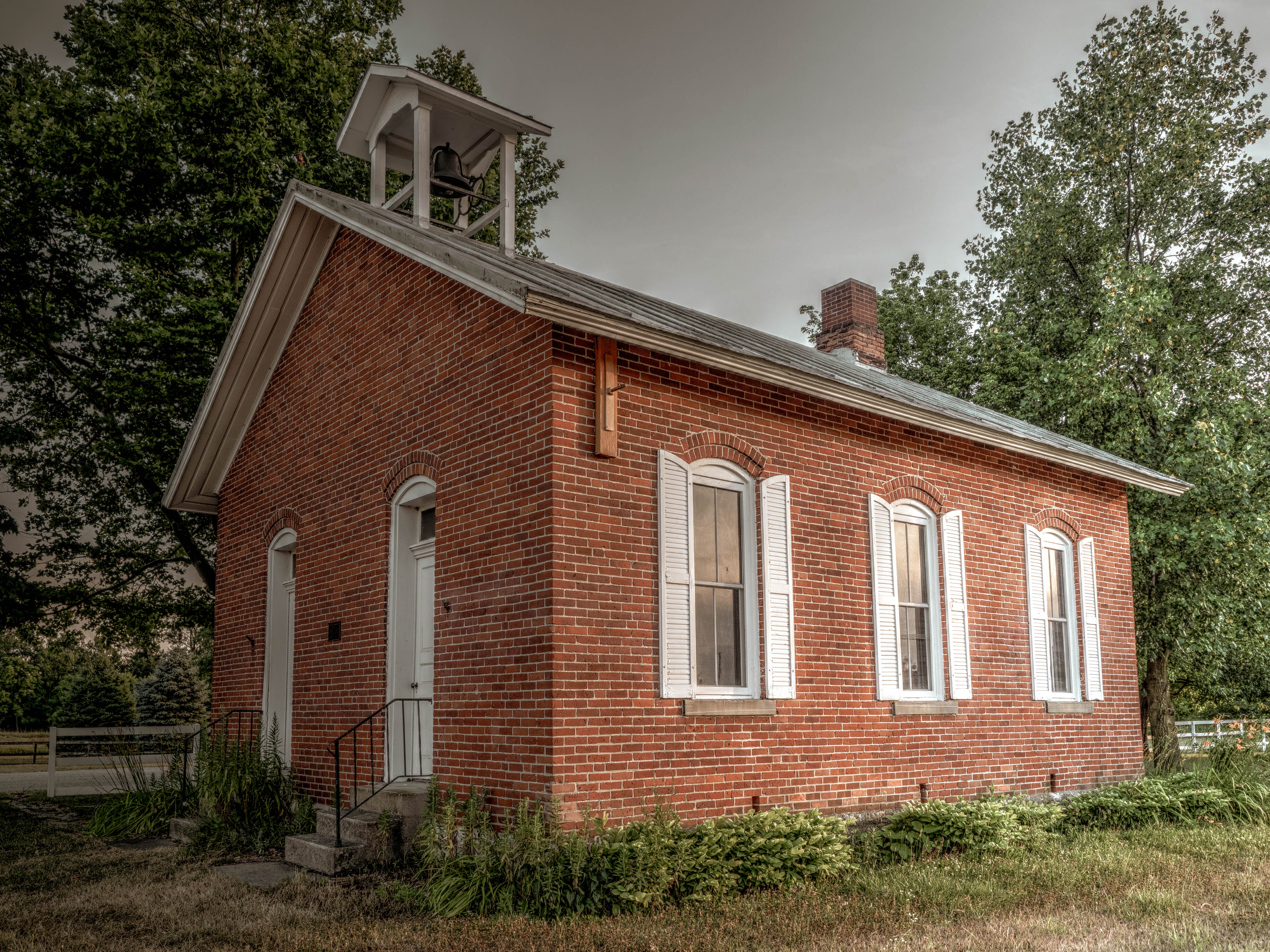
The Little Red Schoolhouse

The Little Red Schoolhouse is a one-room schoolhouse from the 19th century, maintained by the Hancock Historical Museum and located on County Road 236. It was built in 1882 and closed in 1936. After it closed, the schoolhouse served as a granary before belonging to the museum. It is now furnished with oil lamps, a wood/coal burning stove, outhouses, and an outdoor water pump. The museum offers tours of the Little Red Schoolhouse, as well as special immersive programming for local schoolchildren.

=== The Riverside Train ===
The Riverside Train, also maintained by the Hancock Historical Museum, is a miniature train that was formerly located at Riverside Park. The ridable streamliner locomotive and cars date to the 1930s and moved to Riverside Park from Walbridge Park in Toledo in 1951. It ceased operation in 1977 until its refurbishment in 1998. It is currently in operation located on County Road 236.
