= Eduardo Aznar =

Spanish sailor

Personal information
- Nationality: Spanish
- Born: 28 February 1920 Las Arenas, Spain
- Died: 20 November 1981 (aged 61) Madrid, Spain

Sport
- Sport: Sailing

Eduardo Aznar (28 February 1920 – 20 November 1981) was a Spanish sailor. He competed in the Star event at the 1948 Summer Olympics.
