= Timoleon Razelos =

Greek sailor

Personal information
- Nationality: Greek
- Born: 1903 Athens, Greece

Sport
- Sport: Sailing

Timoleon Razelos (born 1903, date of death unknown) was a Greek sailor. He competed in the Star event at the 1952 Summer Olympics.
