= Len Fenton =

Australian sailor

Personal information
- Nationality: Australian
- Born: 29 January 1929
- Died: 8 May 2007 (aged 78)

Sport
- Sport: Sailing

Len Fenton (29 January 1929 – 8 May 2007) was an Australian sailor. He competed in the Star event at the 1948 Summer Olympics.
