= Donald K. Edler =

American sailor (1922–1999)

Donald K. Edler (November 9, 1922 – April 20, 1999) was an American sailor. He won the 1964 Star World Championship together with his son Kent D. Edler. He also finished second in the 1960 edition.
