= Holger Sundström =

Swedish sailor (1925–2023)

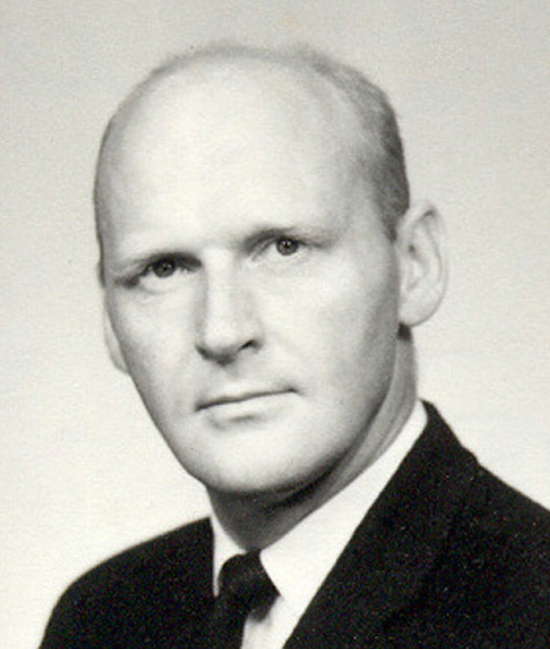

Personal information
- Born: 17 April 1925 Gothenburg, Sweden
- Died: 9 April 2023 (aged 97) Gothenburg, Sweden
- Height: 186 cm (6 ft 1 in)
- Weight: 85 kg (187 lb)

Sailing career
- Sport: Sailing
- Club: Kattegattflottiljen, Gothenburg
Medal record
Representing Sweden
Olympic Games
Bronze medal – third place	1964 Tokyo	Star class

Holger Bertil Sundström (17 April 1925 – 9 April 2023) was a Swedish Olympic sailor. Together with Pelle Pettersson he won a bronze medal in the Star class at the 1964 Summer Olympics.
