= Gerry Fairhead =

Canadian sailor (1923–2019)

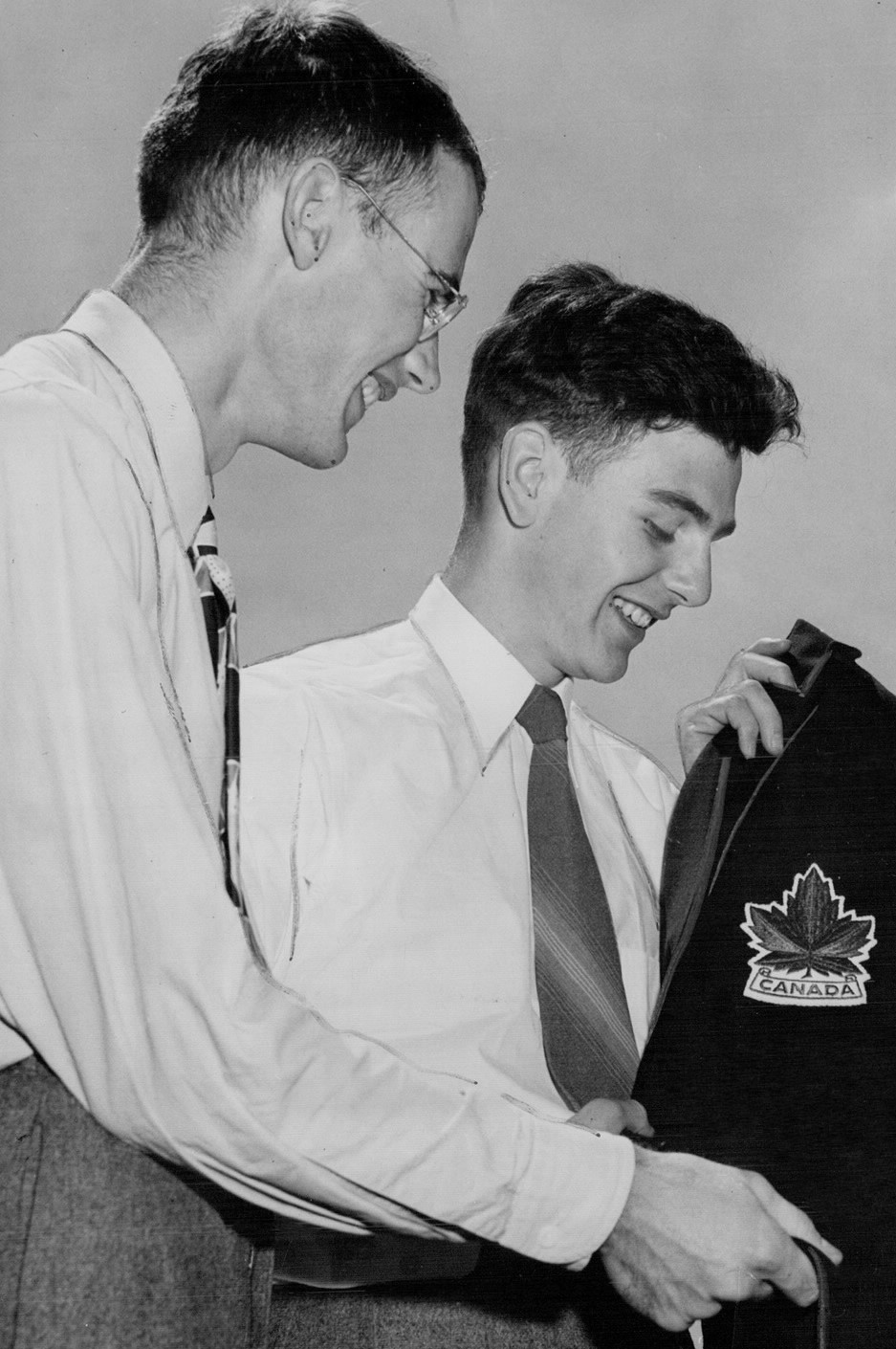
- Fairhead (left) in 1948

Personal information
- Born: March 23, 1923
- Died: July 5, 2019 (aged 96)

Sport
- Sport: Sailing

Arthur Gerald "Gerry" Fairhead (March 23, 1923 – July 5, 2019) was a Canadian sailor. He placed eighth in the Star class at the 1948 Summer Olympics.
