= Yngve Engkvist =

Swedish sailor

John Yngve Adolf Engkvist (18 February 1918 in Stockholm, Sweden – 26 August 1982 in Ekerö, Sweden) was a Swedish Olympic sailor in the Star class. He competed in the 1948 Summer Olympics together with Bengt Melin, where they finished 17th.
