= Stanley Leibel =

Canadian sailor

Stanley Leibel (21 March 1927 - 17 February 2021) was a Canadian sailor who competed in the 1968 Summer Olympics.

His grandson Blake Leibel was convicted of murdering Ukrainian Iana Sakian on 2016 and is currently serving life imprisonment in the United States. He died on 17 February 2021 at 93.
