= Arvid Laurin =

Swedish sailor

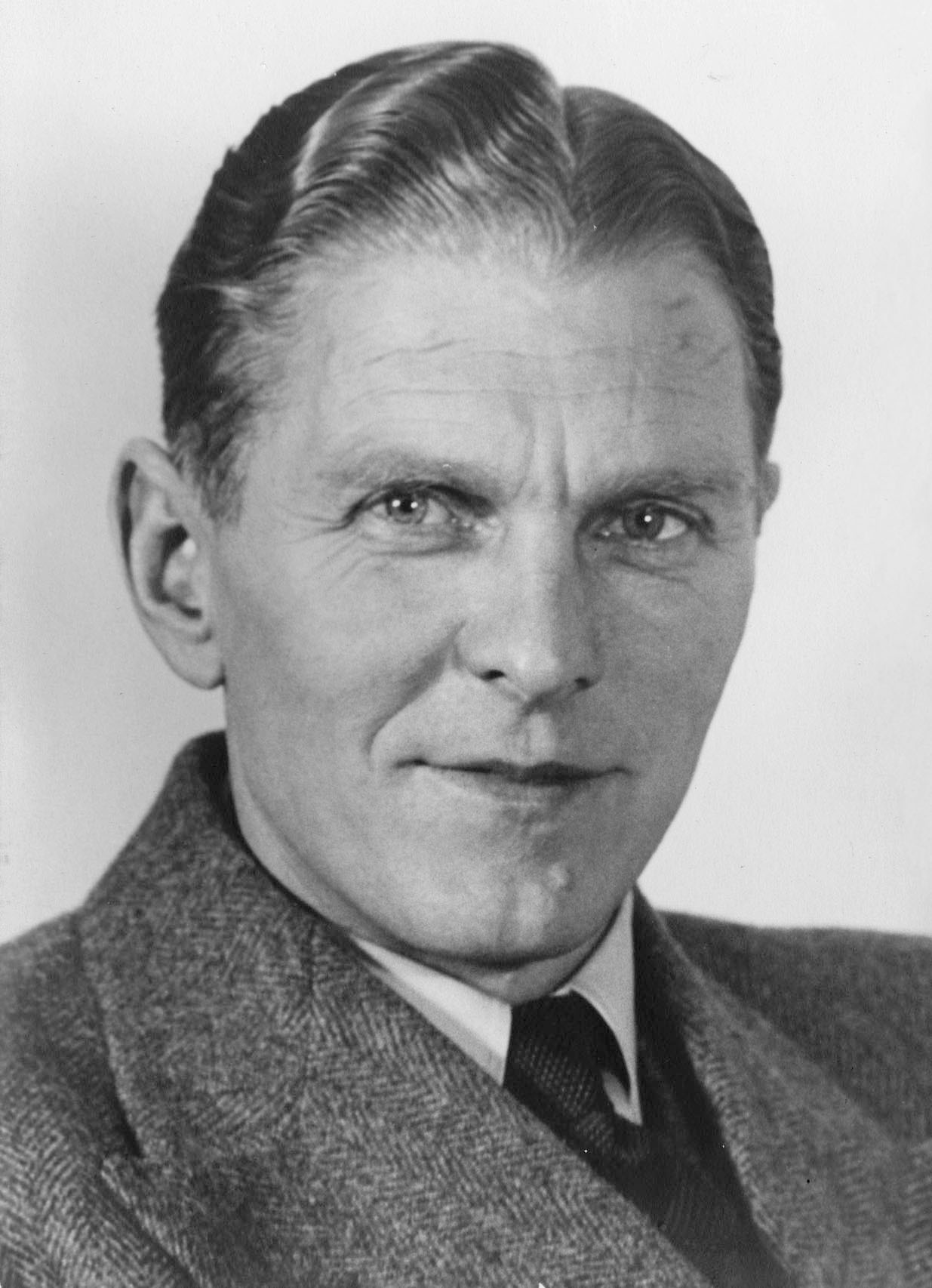
- Arvid Laurin in 1943

Personal information
- Nationality: Swedish
- Born: 3 October 1901 Lysekil, Sweden
- Died: 6 May 1998 (aged 96) Sköldinge, Sweden

Sailing career
- Country: Sweden
- Sport: Sailing
- Club: Royal Swedish Yacht Club
Medal record
Sailing
Silver medal – second place	1936 Berlin	Star class

Arvid Laurentius Laurin (3 October 1901 – 6 May 1998) was a Swedish sailor. He was a crew member of the boat Sunshine that won the silver medal in the Star class at the 1936 Summer Olympics.
