= John Price (sailor) =

American sailor

John Wesley Price (19 January 1920 – 26 May 1991) was an American competitive sailor and Olympic medalist. He won a silver medal in the Star class at the 1952 Summer Olympics in Helsinki, together with John Reid.
