= Andrés Gerard Sr. =

Mexican sailor (1924–2012)

Personal information
- Born: 24 November 1924; Mexico City, Mexico
- Died: 2012 (aged 87–88)

Sport
- Sport: Sailing

Andrés Gerard Sr. (24 November 1924 – 2012) was a Mexican sailor. He competed in the Star event at the 1964 Summer Olympics.
