= Jan Maas (sailor) =

Dutch sailor (1911–1962)

Personal information
- Full name: Jan Maas
- Nationality: Dutch
- Born: 2 April 1911 Batavia, Dutch East Indies
- Died: 31 December 1962 (aged 51) New York
- Height: 1.78 m (5.8 ft)

Sport

Sailing career
- Class: Star
- Updated on 2014-01-03

Jan Maas (2 April 1911 Batavia, Dutch East Indies – 31 December 1962, New York) was a sailor from the Netherlands, who represented his native country at the 1932 Summer Olympics in Los Angeles. Maas competed, with his Brother Bob Maas as helmsman, in the Star, he took the 6th place. The Maas brothers took part at their own cost.

Jan Maas is the younger brother of Bob Maas.

== Sources ==
- "Jan Maas Bio, Stats, and Results". Olympic Sports. Sports-Reference.com. Archived from the original on 2014-01-04.
- "Wie Gaan naar Los Angeles ?" (in Dutch) (Day ed.). Het nieuws van den dag voor Nederlandsch-Indië. 1932-06-03.
- "ZEILEN. BOB MAAS BLIJFT TWEEDE. Protest afgewezen" (in Dutch) (Evening ed.). Het volk : dagblad voor de arbeiderspartĳ. 1932-08-15.
- "Official Report of the Games of the X Olympiad" (PDF). Los Angeles: Xth Olympiade Committee of the Games of Los Angeles, U. S. A. 1932, LTD. 1933. Archived from the original (PDF) on 2012-08-02.
