= Edgar Cruz =

Acoustic guitarist from Oklahoma City

Edgar Cruz is an independent classical and fingerstyle guitarist from Oklahoma City. Cruz has recorded 19 CDs in styles ranging from classical to flamenco to pop to jazz. Cruz is perhaps best known for his fingerstyle arrangement of Queen's "Bohemian Rhapsody". Cruz was featured in the 2004 documentary entitled Spanish Blood: The Guitar of Edgar Cruz produced by OETA (Oklahoma's PBS affiliate). He performs hundreds of times a year and has performed in 43 states and in Mexico, Peru, France, England, and Italy.

== Early life ==
Edgar Michael Cruz was born in Oklahoma City to Manuel Cruz II and Socorro Cruz. He has five siblings, including his brother Mark Anthony Cruz who is also a musician. He began playing guitar in 1976 when his father, Manuel Cruz II, a mariachi musician, taught him how to play. Manuel was from Matahuala, Mexico, and learned guitar from Armando Castenada of San Antonio, Texas. Manuel immigrated from Mexico to Oklahoma City in 1947. Edgar Cruz studied classical guitar at Oklahoma City University, graduating in 1986. He also attended Oklahoma City Community College, earning an associate's degree in drafting. Manuel, Mark, and Edgar have toured together as the Cruz Family Trio. He made early cassette recordings The Best of Edgar Cruz Vol. I-IV in the 1980s, prior to releasing Throw Another Tape on the Fire as a compact disc.

== Discography ==
- Throw Another Tape on the Fire (1989)
- Classical Demands (1990)
- Those Were The Days (1992)
- Opening Night (1994)
- The Acoustic Rock Transcriptions of Edgar Cruz (1996)
- Reminiscence (1997)
- Timeless (2000)
- Opening Night 2 (2002)
- The Cruz Trio In Concert (2003)
- Guitarras de Amor (2003)
- The Essence of Mexico (2003)
- Guitarras De Fuego (2005)
- Sweet Georgia Blue (2005)
- Spanish Blood (2005)
- Guitarras de Baile (2006)
- Pieces of Edgar (2007)
- Oklahoma Guitar (2011)
- Cruzin the Beatles (2014)
- Yesterday Tripper (2018)
