= José Luis Allende =

Spanish sailor

Personal information
- Nationality: Spanish
- Born: 4 February 1926 Madrid, Spain
- Died: 26 January 2015 (aged 88) Madrid, Spain

Sport
- Sport: Sailing

José Luis Allende (4 February 1926 – 26 January 2015) was a Spanish sailor. He competed in the Star event at the 1948 Summer Olympics.
