= Andreas Ziro =

Greek sailor

Personal information
- Nationality: Greek
- Born: 1910
- Died: 1991 (aged 80–81)

Sport
- Sport: Sailing

Andreas Ziro (1910 – 1991) was a Greek sailor. He competed in the Star event at the 1952 Summer Olympics.
