= Eddy Stutterheim =

Dutch sailor (1908–1977)

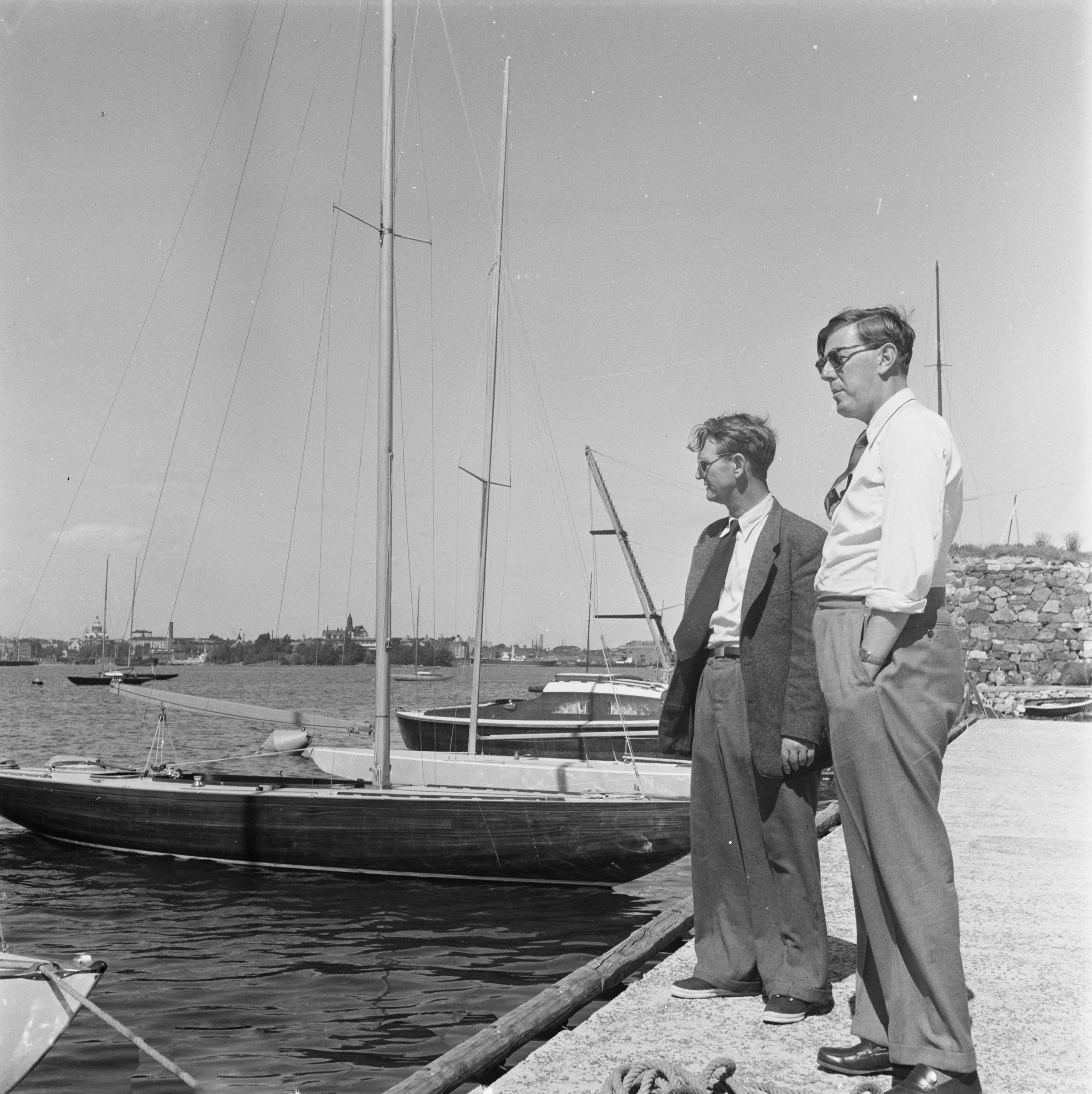
- Bob Maas and Eddy Stutterheim (right)

Personal information
- Full name: Edward Stutterheim
- Nationality: Dutch
- Born: 11 August 1908 Amsterdam, Netherlands
- Died: 13 April 1977 (aged 68) Opio, France

Sport

Sailing career
- Class(es): Star; Dragon
Medal record
sailing
Representing Netherlands
Bronze medal – third place	1948 London	Star
- Updated on 2014-01-04

Edward Stutterheim (11 August 1908 – 13 April 1977) was a Dutch sailor, who represented his country as at the 1948 Summer Olympics in Torbay. Stutterheim, as crew member on the Dutch Star BEM II, took the bronze medal with helmsman Bob Maas. The team returned in 1952 in Helsinki where they took the 7th place.

In the 1956 Olympics in Melbourne Stutterheim was the Dragon crew for the Dutch Olympic team. However, after the Soviet invasion of Hungary, the Dutch government decided that the Dutch Olympic team would not compete.

== Sources ==
- "Eddy Stutterheim Bio, Stats, and Results". Olympic Sports. Sports-Reference.com. Archived from the original on 2013-11-12.
- "DE KEUZEWEDSTRIJDEN VOOR DE OLYMPISCHE SPELEN" (Evening ed.). Nieuwsblad van Friesland : Hepkema's courant. 1946-06-25.
- "Bronzen medailles voor Bob Maas en Koos de Jong" (in Dutch) (Dag ed.). Het vrĳe volk : democratisch-socialistisch dagblad. 1948-08-13.
- "The Official Report of the Organising Committee for the XIV Olympiad London 1948" (PDF). 1951. Archived from the original (PDF) on 2011-07-16.
- "OLYMPISCHE ZEILPLOEG" (Morning ed.). De vrije pers : ochtendbulletin. 1952-06-20.
- "The Officiel Report of the Organizing Committee for the games of the XV Olympiad Helsinki 1952" (PDF). 1955. Archived from the original (PDF) on 2008-04-11.
- "Zeilteam voor Melbourne" (in Dutch) (Day ed.). De Tĳd : godsdienstig-staatkundig dagblad. 1956-07-13.
- "Olympische sporters 1956 krijgen alsnog erkenning" (in Dutch) (Day ed.). Geschiedenis 24. 2006-07-03.
- "Wij hadden moeten gaan" (in Dutch) (Day ed.). Nieuwsblad van het Noorden. 1956-12-24.
