= Richard Gates (sailor) =

American sailor (born 1943)

Richard Redwine Gates (born February 3, 1943, in Cincinnati, Ohio) is an American former Olympic sailor in the Star class. He competed in the 1972 Summer Olympics together with Alan Holt, where they finished 10th.
