= Arnoldo Pekelharing =

Argentine sailor

Arnoldo Pekelharing (1 July 1936 – 13 January 2001) was an Argentine sailor who competed in the 1956 Summer Olympics and in the 1964 Summer Olympics.
