= Bengt Melin =

Swedish sailor

Bengt Einar Melin (7 June 1917 in Karlstad, Sweden – 31 March 2007 in Almuñécar, Spain) was a Swedish Olympic sailor in the Star class. He competed in the 1948 Summer Olympics and in the 1952 Summer Olympics. In 1948, together with Yngve Engkvist, they finished 17th and in 1952, together with Börje Carlsson, they finished 7th.
