= Bob Maas =

Dutch sailor (1907–1996)

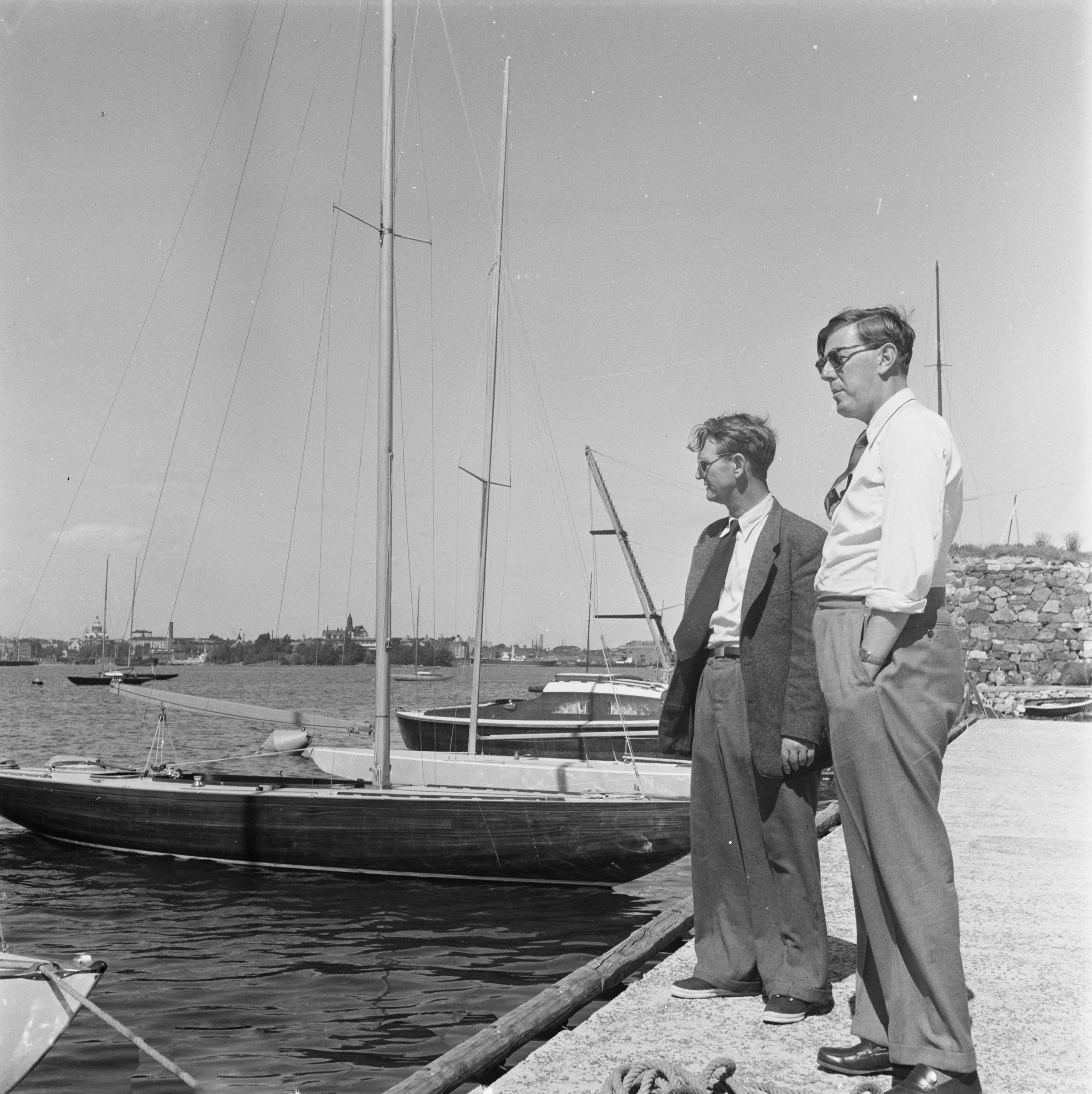
- Bob (left) and Eddy Stutterheim

Personal information
- Full name: Adrianus Lambertus Joseph Maas
- Nationality: Dutch
- Born: 18 October 1907 Batavia, Dutch East Indies
- Died: 17 December 1996 (aged 89) Hilversum, Netherlands
- Height: 1.73 m (5.7 ft)

Sailing career
- Sport: Sailing
- Class(es): Snowbird, Star
Medal record
Sailing
Representing Netherlands
Olympic Games
Silver medal – second place	1932 Los Angeles	Snowbird
	1932 Los Angeles	Star (6th)
Bronze medal – third place	1936 Berlin	Star
Bronze medal – third place	1948 London	Star
	1952 Helsinki	Star (8th)
- Updated on 8 May 2015

Adrianus Lambertus Joseph "Bob" Maas (18 October 1907 – 17 December 1996) was a sailor from the Netherlands, who represented his native country at the 1932 Summer Olympics in Los Angeles and took the Silver medal. In that same Olympics, Maas and his brother Jan Maas, competed in the Dutch Star Holland. In this series Maas took the 6th place. The Maas brothers took part at their own cost.

In 1936, with Willem de Vries Lentsch as crew, Maas took part in the Dutch Star BEM II and took the Bronze. During the 1948 Summer Olympics Bob Maas also took a Bronze medal in the Star. This time with Eddy Stutterheim as crew. His last Olympic appearance was in 1952 again with Eddy Stutterheim as crew. This time they finished 8th.

Bob Maas is the older brother of Jan Maas.

== Sources ==
- "Bob Maas Bio, Stats, and Results". Olympic Sports. Sports-Reference.com. Archived from the original on 2020-04-17.
- "Wie Gaan naar Los Angeles ?" (in Dutch) (Day ed.). Het nieuws van den dag voor Nederlandsch-Indië. 1932-06-03.
- "Algemeen Handelsblad" (in Dutch) (Evening ed.). Het nieuws van den dag voor Nederlandsch-Indië. 1932-08-12.
- "Bob Maas onttroond als Olympisch kampioen Protest van den Franschman Lebrun toegewezen" (in Dutch) (Morning ed.). Het volk : dagblad voor de arbeiderspartĳ. 1932-08-13.
- "ZEILEN. BOB MAAS BLIJFT TWEEDE. Protest afgewezen" (in Dutch) (Evening ed.). Het volk : dagblad voor de arbeiderspartĳ. 1932-08-15.
- "Official Report of the Games of the X Olympiad" (PDF). Los Angeles: Xth Olympiade Committee of the Games of Los Angeles, U. S. A. 1932, LTD. 1933. Archived from the original (PDF) on 2012-08-02.
- "Na de Olympische Spelen te Berlijn. Ons land behoort tot de sterkste Sport-naties der wereld" (in Dutch) (Dag ed.). De Graafschap-bode. 1936-08-19.
- "The XITH Olympic Games Berlin, 1936: Officiel Report, Volume I" (PDF). Berlin: the Organisationskomitee für die XI. Olympiade Berlin 1936 e. V. 1936. Archived from the original (PDF) on 2007-07-09.
- "The XITH Olympic Games Berlin, 1936: Officiel Report, Volume II" (PDF). Berlin: the Organisationskomitee für die XI. Olympiade Berlin 1936 e. V. 1936. Archived from the original (PDF) on 2007-07-09.
- "DE KEUZEWEDSTRIJDEN VOOR DE OLYMPISCHE SPELEN" (Evening ed.). Nieuwsblad van Friesland : Hepkema's courant. 1946-06-25.
- "Bronzen medailles voor Bob Maas en Koos de Jong" (in Dutch) (Dag ed.). Het vrĳe volk : democratisch-socialistisch dagblad. 1948-08-13.
- "The Official Report of the Organising Committee for the XIV Olympiad London 1948" (PDF). 1951. Archived from the original (PDF) on 2011-07-16.
- "OLYMPISCHE ZEILPLOEG" (Morning ed.). De vrije pers : ochtendbulletin. 1952-06-20.
- "The Officiel Report of the Organizing Committee for the games of the XV Olympiad Helsinki 1952" (PDF). 1955. Archived from the original (PDF) on 2008-04-11.
