= Agostino Straulino =

Italian sailor

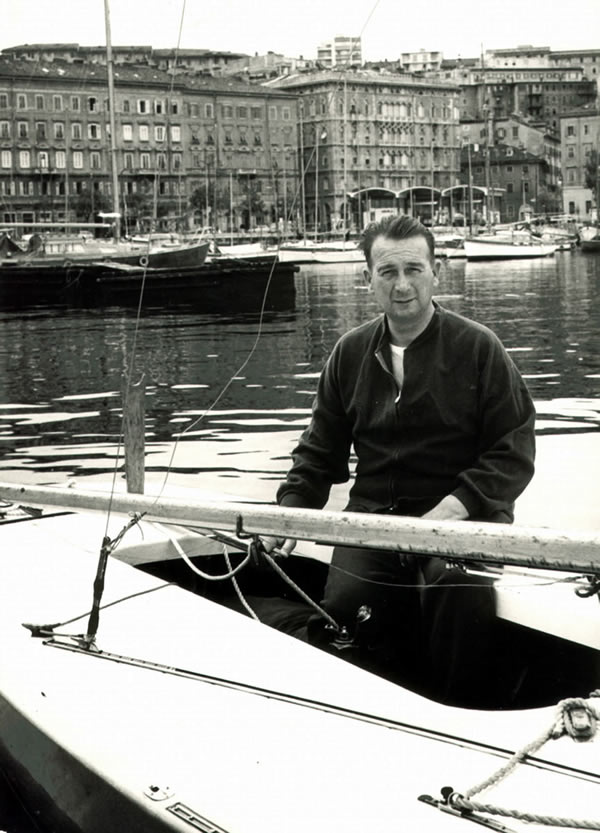
- Straulino in Port of Trieste, 1960s

Personal information
- Nationality: Italy
- Born: 10 October 1914 Lussinpiccolo, Austria-Hungary
- Died: 14 December 2004 (aged 90) Rome, Italy

Sailing career
- Sport: Sailing
- Class: Star
Medal record
Sailing
Representing Italy
Olympic Games
Gold medal – first place	1952 Helsinki	Star class
Silver medal – second place	1956 Melbourne	Star class
World Championships
Gold medal – first place	1952 Cascais	Star class
Gold medal – first place	1953 Naples	Star class
Gold medal – first place	1956 Naples	Star class
Gold medal – first place	1965 Naples	5.5m
Silver medal – second place	1939 Kiel	Star class
Silver medal – second place	1948 Cascais	Star class
Bronze medal – third place	1954 Cascais	Star class

Agostino Straulino (10 October 1914 – 14 December 2004) was an Italian sailor and sailboat racer, who won one Olympic gold medal and one silver medal in the Star class, and eight consecutive European championships and two world championships in this class and was world champion in the 5.5m-class.

== Biography ==
Straulino was born in Lussinpiccolo (Mali Lošinj), on the island of Lussino (Lošinj) (at that time part of Austria-Hungary, but now part of Croatia).

Straulino gained his first sailing experiences as a child on the Kvarner Gulf of the northern Adriatic Sea. He later attended the Naval Academy at Livorno and embarked on a career in the Italian Navy. At the 1936 Summer Olympics he was a reserve sailor. During World War II Straulino served in the Italian Decima Flottiglia MAS during its operations in Gibraltar. After the war he became the commanding officer of the Italian training vessel Amerigo Vespucci for some time and eventually rose to the rank of rear admiral. He first competed at the 1948 Summer Olympics and finished fifth in the Star class.

Between 1949 and 1956 Straulino won eight consecutive European championships in the starboat class. In 1952 and 1953 he was also world champion in this class. The climax of his career as a sportsman was his gold medal at the 1952 Summer Olympics in Helsinki. Four years later he won the silver medal at the 1956 Summer Olympics in Melbourne. After his partner Nicolò Rode (also from Lussino/Lošinj) quit, Straulino continued to compete at Olympic games with his new partner Carlo Rolandi in the Star boat class (1960 Summer Olympics, Rome, fourth place) and the 5.5m-class (1964 Summer Olympics, Tokyo, fourth place). A year later he won the world championship in the 5.5m-class.

He continued to compete in regattas in bigger boats and won the One Ton Cup off Porto Cervo in 1973 and the Italian Giraglia long-distance race. Mali Lošinj pronounced him an honourable citizen. Straulino was the initiator of Lošinjska regata, a sailing competition. Straulino died in Rome in 2004.

== Non-sporting biography ==
Like most Italians living in territories which, after World War II, were ceded to the new socialist state of Yugoslavia, the property of his family was nationalized and expropriated by Tito, and despite leaving the island of his birth at a young age, Straulino was so deeply in love with his island that he was regular visitor, especially after he retired and always wanted to know what was going on Lošinj.

In line with his final wish, he was buried in the town of birth, Mali Lošinj (formerly Lussinpiccolo).

== See also ==
- Legends of Italian sport - Walk of Fame
