= Cid Nascimento =

Brazilian sailor (1910–1995)

Cid de Oliveira Nascimento (November 23, 1910 – February 1995) was a Brazilian Olympic sailor in the Star class. He competed in the 1952 Summer Olympics together with Tacariju de Paula, where they finished 12th, and in the 1960 Summer Olympics together with Jorge Pontual, where they finished 9th.
