= Börje Carlsson =

Swedish sailor

Börje Gunnar Carlsson (13 June 1933 – 28 July 2017) was a Swedish Olympic sailor in the Star class. He was born in Stockholm Sweden. He competed in the 1952 Summer Olympics together with Bengt Melin, where they finished 7th.
