= Alan Holt =

American sailor

Alan Christian Holt (born June 29, 1939) is a retired American Olympic sailor in the Star class. He competed in the 1972 Summer Olympics together with Richard Gates, where they finished 10th.
