= Jean Peytel =

French sailor

Personal information
- Born: 24 January 1909; Paris, France
- Died: 16 August 2002 (aged 93)

Jean Peytel (24 January 1909 – 16 August 2002) was a French sailor. He competed in the mixed two person keelboat at the 1932 and 1948 Summer Olympics. In between, he competed in the mixed 6 metres at the 1936 Summer Olympics. His final competition was in the mixed three person keelboat at the 1960 Summer Olympics.
