= Walter von Hütschler =

Brazilian sailor

Walter Nicolau Herbert Max Johan von Hütschler (1906 in São Paulo – 1997) was a German-Brazilian sailor in the Star class. He won the 1938 and 1939 editions of the Star World Championship.
