= Tacariju de Paula =

Brazilian sailor

Tacariju Thomé de Paula (January 30, 1917 – September 1, 2005) was a Brazilian Olympic sailor in the Star class. He competed in the 1952 Summer Olympics together with Cid Nascimento, where they finished 12th.
