= João Tito =

Portuguese sailor (1924–1982)

Personal information
- Nationality: Portuguese
- Born: 19 January 1924 Lisbon, Portugal
- Died: 4 March 1982 (aged 58)

Sport
- Sport: Sailing

João Tito (19 January 1924 – 4 March 1982) was a Portuguese sailor. He competed at the 1948 Summer Olympics and the 1952 Summer Olympics. Tito died on 4 March 1982, at the age of 58.
