= Luiz Ramos =

Brazilian sailor (1929–2025)

Luiz Carlos Peixoto de Lima Ramos (24 December 1929 – 12 January 2023) was a Brazilian sailor who competed in the 1964 Summer Olympics. Ramos was born in Rio de Janeiro on 24 December 1929, and died there on 12 January 2023, at the age of 93.
