= Tito Nordio =

Personal information
- Nationality: Italian
- Born: 17 March 1908; Trieste
- Died: 13 October 1959 (aged 51)

Sailing career
- Class: 12' Dinghy
- Updated on 20 March 2015

Tito Nordio (17 March 1908 – 13 October 1959) was a sailor from Italy who represented his country at the 1928 Summer Olympics in Amsterdam, Netherlands.
