= Philippe Chancerel =

French sailor

Philippe Chancerel (6 April 1925 – 15 August 2002) is a French sailor who competed in the 1948 Summer Olympics and in the 1956 Summer Olympics.

Chancerel was born in Paris on 6 April 1925. He died in Évecquemont on 15 August 2002, aged 77.
