= Júlio Gourinho =

Portuguese sailor

Personal information
- Nationality: Portuguese
- Born: 29 April 1923 Lisbon, Portugal

Sport
- Sport: Sailing

Júlio Gourinho (born 29 April 1923, died before 2008) was a Portuguese sailor. He competed at the 1948 Summer Olympics, the 1952 Summer Olympics and the 1960 Summer Olympics.
