= Fernando Bello (sailor, born 1924) =

Portuguese sailor

Fernando Pinto Coelho Bello
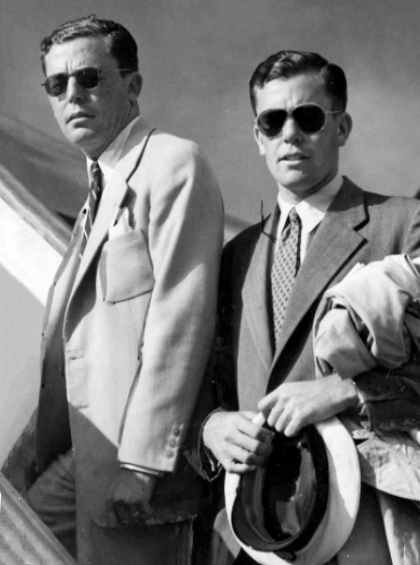
- Duarte and Fernando Bello in 1948

Personal information
- Full name: Fernando Pinto Coelho Bello
- Nationality: Portuguese
- Born: 1 September 1924 Lourenço Marques, Mozambique
- Died: 8 November 1995 (aged 71) Cascais, Portugal
- Height: 180 cm (5 ft 11 in)
- Weight: 82 kg (181 lb)
Medal record
Representing Portugal
Olympic Games
Silver medal – second place	1948 London	Swallow
Star World Championships
Bronze medal – third place	1952 Cascais, Portugal	Faneca
Silver medal – second place	1962 Cascais, Portugal	Faneca

Fernando Pinto Coelho Bello (1 September 1924 – 8 November 1995) was a Portuguese sailor. Together with his brother Duarte Manuel Bello he competed at the 1948, 1952, 1956 and 1960 Olympics and won a silver medal in the Swallow class in 1948, placing fourth in 1952.

Bello brothers also raced Star class keelboats, winning a silver medal at the 1962 World Championship and a bronze in 1952.
