= Durward Knowles =

Bahamian sailor

Sir Durward Knowles OBE
Personal information
- Full name: Durward Randolph Knowles
- Nationality: Bahamas
- Born: 2 November 1917 Nassau, Bahamas
- Died: 24 February 2018 (aged 100) Nassau, Bahamas

Sailing career
- Sport: Sailing
- Class: Star
Medal record
Sailing
Representing Bahamas
Olympic Games
Gold medal – first place	1964 Tokyo	Star class
Bronze medal – third place	1956 Melbourne	Star class
World Championships
Gold medal – first place	1947 Los Angeles	Star class
Silver medal – second place	1954 Cascais	Star class
Bronze medal – third place	1946 Havana	Star class
Bronze medal – third place	1974 Laredo	Star class

Sir Durward Randolph Knowles (2 November 1917 – 24 February 2018) was a sailor and Olympic champion from The Bahamas. He won the gold medal in the Star class at the 1964 Summer Olympics in Tokyo, together with Cecil Cooke. He won the bronze medal in the same class at the 1956 Summer Olympics in Melbourne. He had previously competed for the United Kingdom in the 1948 Olympics, finishing in 4th place in the Star class together with Sloane Elmo Farrington. Representing the Bahamas, Knowles also won gold in the 1959 Pan American Games star class (with Farrington). He is one of only five athletes who have competed in the Olympics over a span of 40 years, along with fencer Ivan Joseph Martin Osiier, sailor Magnus Konow, showjumper Ian Millar, and sailor Paul Elvstrøm.

In 2014, the second Legend-class patrol boat of the Royal Bahamas Defence Force was commissioned as HMBS Durward Knowles. In May 2016, following the death of Sándor Tarics, he became the oldest living Olympic champion. He turned 100 in November 2017 and died on 24 February 2018.

== Honours ==
Knowles was appointed Officer of the Order of the British Empire (OBE) in the 1965 New Year Honours for public services in the Bahamas.

Knowles was knighted in the 1996 Birthday Honours "for services to the community and to sport, particularly sailing." In 1997, he was awarded The Bahamas' Order of Merit.

== See also ==
- List of centenarians (sportspeople)
- List of athletes with the most appearances at Olympic Games
