= Yves Lorion =

French sailor

Personal information
- Nationality: French
- Born: 19 July 1901 Marengo, French Algeria

Sport
- Sport: Sailing

Yves Lorion (born 19 July 1901, date of death unknown) was a French sailor. He competed in the Star event at the 1948 Summer Olympics.
