= Italian Sailing Federation =

Sports governing body in Italy

Federazione Italiana Vela
- Sport: Sailing
- Jurisdiction: Italy
- Abbreviation: FIV
- Founded: 1879
- Affiliation: WS
- Affiliation date: 1907
- Headquarters: Genoa
- Location: Italy
- President: Carlo Croce

Official website
- www.federvela.it

The Italian Sailing Federation (Italian: Federazione Italiana Vela, FIV) is the World Sailing member national authority for Italy.

== Classes ==
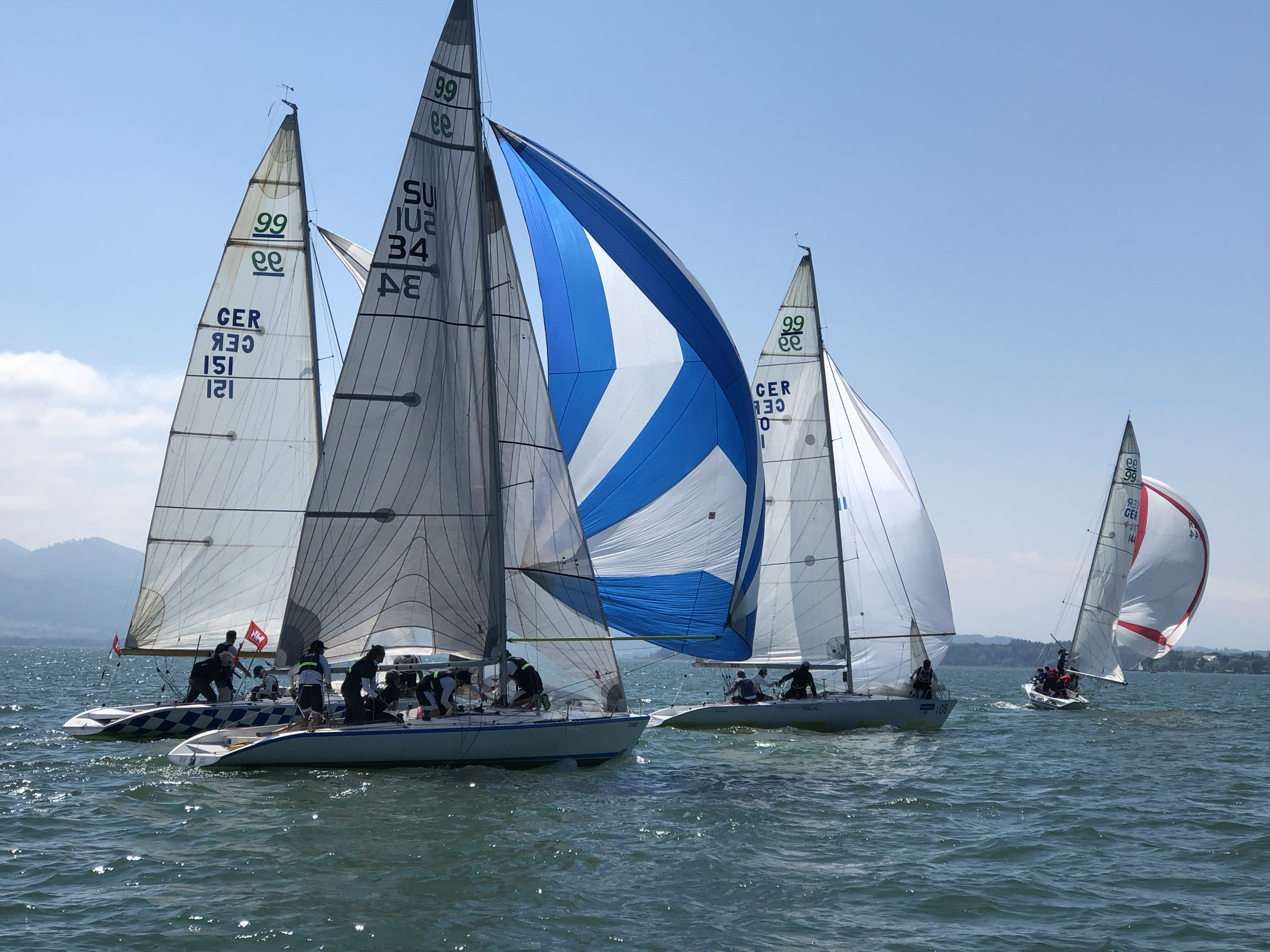
Asso 99s in 2018

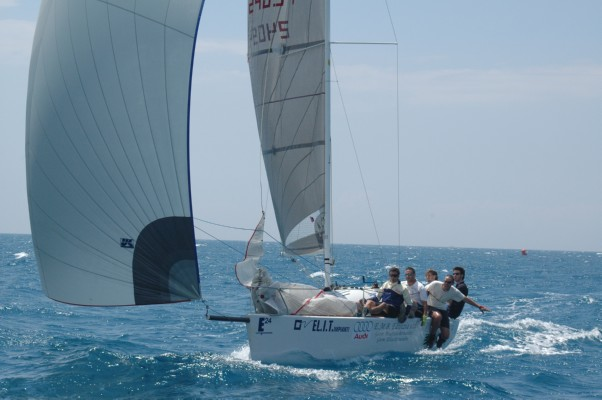
Este 24 in 2008

The following class organisations are affiliated to the Italian Sailing Federation:

- 10 Rater, International A Class, International Marblehead, One Metre
- 12 foot dinghy
- 12 Metre
- 18 HT
- 2.4 Metre
- 29er, 49er, 49er FX, and Nacra (15 and 17)
- 420
- 470
- 555 FIV
- 69F
- Asso 4000
- Asso 99
- Asso Bug
- Blusail 24
- Byte CII
- Classic A-catamaran class
- Contender
- D-One
- Dart 18
- Dolphin 81
- Dragon
- Ego 333
- Este 24
- Europe
- Finn
- Fireball
- First 8
- Flying Dutchman
- Formula 18
- Formula Windsurfing, International Funboard, Raceboard
- Fun
- H 22
- Half ton
- Hansa 303
- Hobie (16, 16 Spi, Dragoon, Tiger, and Wildcat)
- ILCA (4, 6, and 7)
- International A-class catamaran
- International FJ
- J/24
- J/70
- J/80
- Kiteboarding
- L'Équipe
- Laser 2
- Lega Italiana Vela
- Lightning
- Mattia Esse
- Melges 24
- Meteor
- Micro
- Mini Transat 6.50
- Moth
- O'pen Skiff
- Optimist
- Platu 25
- Protagonist 7.50
- RS 21
- RS Aero
- RS Feva
- RS:X
- RS500
- S Monotipo
- SB20
- Snipe
- Soling
- Sonar
- Star
- Sunfish
- Surprise 25
- Techno 293 and Techno 293+
- Tornado
- Tridente (14 and 16)
- Tyka
- UFO 22
- UFO 28 OD
- Vaurien
- Vela d'altura
- Vela latina
- Vela tradizionale
- Vele d'epoca
- Waszp
- Windsurfer
- X-35
- X-41

== Notable sailors ==
See Category:Italian sailors

=== Olympic sailing ===
See Category:Olympic sailors for Italy

=== Offshore sailing ===
See Category:Italian sailors (sport)

== Yacht clubs ==
See Category:Yacht clubs in Italy
