= Dario Salata =

Italian sailor

Personal information
- Nationality: Italian
- Born: 21 April 1913; Mali Lošinj, Austria-Hungary
- Died: 7 December 1990 (aged 77); Rapallo, Italy

Sport
- Sport: Sailing

Dario Salata (21 April 1913 – 7 December 1990) was an Italian sailor. He competed at the 1948 Summer Olympics and the 1952 Summer Olympics.
