= Bacardi Cup =

Annual sailing event in Florida, US

- First held: 1927
- Classes: Star
- Venue: Biscayne Bay
- Champions: Mateusz Kusznierewicz & Bruno Prada
- Most titles: Ding Schoonmaker, Mark Reynolds (7 each)

The Bacardi Cup is an annual sailing event hosted in Biscayne Bay near Miami Beach, FL. The event generally takes place in March. Competitors range from amateur sailors to Olympic professionals and sailing world champions, and range in age from 18 to 85, as of the 2023 season.

== History ==
The first event was established in 1927, and was known originally as the Cup of Cuba, before being sponsored by Bacardi from then onward. In 1962, the regatta was hosted in Coconut Grove/Miami at the Coral Reef Yacht Club, where it has continued to sail from every year since. The overthrow of the Cuban government in 1934 led to the suspension of the event for the year. World War II suspended the event from 1943-1947 as well. 1956 was the last time the event had been interrupted, as a result of the Cuban Revolution.

== Winners ==
- 1927 – Adrian Iselin II & Ed Willis (USA)
- 1928 – F. Robinson & D. Robinson (USA)
- 1929 – Fred Bedford & Briggs Cunningham (USA)
- 1930 – W. F. Teves (USA)
- 1931 – Carlos de Cárdenas (CUB)
- 1932 – David Atwater & Charles Lawton (USA)
- 1933 – Adrian Iselin II & Elwood White (USA)
- 1934 – not held
- 1935 – Adrian Iselin II & Sr. Carricabura (USA)
- 1936 – Adrian Iselin II & Elwood White (USA)
- 1937 – Paul Shields & Corny Shields (USA)
- 1938 – Harry Gale Nye Jr. (USA)
- 1939 – Paul Smart (USA)
- 1940 – Harry Gale Nye Jr. (USA)
- 1941 – Harry Gale Nye Jr. (USA)
- 1942 – Alfred de Marigny (BAH)
- 1948 – Lockwood Pirie & Sam Pirie (USA)
- 1949 – Lockwood Pirie & F. S. Dixon (USA)
- 1950 – E. W. Etchells & Mary Etchells (USA)
- 1951 – Durward Knowles & Ding Schoonmaker (BAH)
- 1952 – Robert Lippincott & Bob Levine (USA)
- 1953 – Ding Schoonmaker & Donald Pritchard (BAH)
- 1954 – Alberto Reyes & José de la Campa (CUB)
- 1955 – Jorge de Cárdenas & Alvaro de Cárdenas (CUB)
- 1957 – Alvaro de Cárdenas & Jorge de Cárdenas (CUB)
- 1962 – Basil Kelly & David Kelly (BAH)
- 1963 – Howard Lippincott & Herb Hild (USA)
- 1964 – Ding Schoonmaker & Asa Colson (USA)
- 1965 – Read Ruggles & David Dickey (USA)
- 1966 – Joe Duplin & Rodney Long (USA)
- 1967 – Richard Stearns & Lynn Williams (USA)
- 1968 – Richard Stearns & Lynn Williams (USA)
- 1969 – Frank Zagarino & Gould Ryder (USA)
- 1970 – Ding Schoonmaker & Jörg Bruder (USA)
- 1971 – Ding Schoonmaker & Jörg Bruder (USA)
- 1972 – Read Ruggles & David Dickey (USA)
- 1973 – Bill Buchan Jr. & Craig Thomas (USA)
- 1974 – Ding Schoonmaker & Jerry Ford (USA)
- 1975 – Peter Wright & William Wright (USA)
- 1976 – Ding Schoonmaker & Jerry Ford (USA)
- 1977 – Ding Schoonmaker & Chris Rogers (USA)
- 1978 – Peter Wright & Todd Cozzens (USA)
- 1979 – Bill Buchan Jr. & Douglas Knight (USA)
- 1980 – Bill Buchan Jr. & Douglas Knight (USA)
- 1981 – Vince Brun & Todd Cozzens (USA)
- 1982 – Vince Brun & Randy McLaren (USA)
- 1983 – Andy Menkart & James Kavle (USA)
- 1984 – Mark Reynolds & Chris Gould (USA)
- 1985 – Vince Brun & Robert Billingham (USA)
- 1986 – Vince Brun & Hugo Schreiner (USA)
- 1987 – Vince Brun & Hugo Schreiner (USA)
- 1988 – Ed Adams & Tom Olsen (USA)
- 1989 – Mark Reynolds & Hal Haenel (USA)
- 1990 – Mark Reynolds & Hal Haenel (USA)
- 1991 – Ed Adams & George Iverson (USA)
- 1992 – Mark Reynolds & Hal Haenel (USA)
- 1993 – Peter Wright & Greg Cook (USA)
- 1994 – Ross MacDonald & Bruce MacDonald (CAN)
- 1995 – Ross MacDonald & Kai Bjorn (CAN)
- 1996 – Vince Brun & Magnus Liljedahl (USA)
- 1997 – Mark Reynolds & Magnus Liljedahl (USA)
- 1998 – Mark Reynolds & Magnus Liljedahl (USA)
- 1999 – Ross MacDonald & Kai Bjorn (CAN)
- 2000 – Ross MacDonald & Kai Bjorn (CAN)
- 2001 – Peter Bromby & Martin Siese (BER)
- 2002 – Mark Reynolds & Magnus Liljedahl (USA)
- 2003 – Peter Bromby & Martin Siese (BER)
- 2004 – Afonso Domingos & Bernardo Santos (POR)
- 2005 – Mark Mendelblatt & Mark Strube (USA)
- 2006 – John Dane III & Austin Sperry (USA)
- 2007 – Hamish Pepper & David Giles (NZL)
- 2008 – Afonso Domingos & Bernardo Santos (POR)
- 2009 – Peter Bromby & Magnus Liljedahl (BER)
- 2010 – Rick Merriman & Phil Trinter (USA)
- 2011 – Guillaume Florent & Pascal Rambeau (FRA)
- 2012 – Xavier Rohart & Pierre-Alexis Ponsot (FRA)
- 2013 – Mark Mendelblatt & Brian Fatih (USA)
- 2014 – Lars Grael & Samuel Goncalves (BRA)
- 2015 – Lars Grael & Samuel Goncalves (BRA)
- 2016 – Robert Stanjek & Frithjof Kleen (GER)
- 2017 – Mark Mendelblatt & Magnus Liljedahl (USA)
- 2018 – Diego Negri & Sergio Lambertenghi (ITA)
- 2019 – Eric Doyle & Payson Infelise (USA)
- 2020 – Mateusz Kusznierewicz & Bruno Prada (POL)
- 2021 – Mateusz Kusznierewicz & Bruno Prada (POL)
- 2022 – Mateusz Kusznierewicz & Bruno Prada (POL)
- 2023 – Mateusz Kusznierewicz & Bruno Prada (POL)
- 2024 – Mateusz Kusznierewicz & Bruno Prada (POL)
- 2025 – Mateusz Kusznierewicz & Bruno Prada (POL)
