= 1947 Star World Championship =

Event title
- Edition: 25th

Event details
- Venue: Los Angeles, United States
- Yachts: Star
- Titles: 1

Competitors
- Competitors: 42
- Competing nations: 5

Results
- (gold) Gold: (The Bahamas) Knowles & Farrington
- (silver) Silver: (United States) Smart & Ogilvy
- (bronze) Bronze: (United States) Stearns & Rodgers

The 1947 Star World Championship was held in Los Angeles, United States in 1947.

== Results ==
Results of individual races
| Pos | Boat name | Crew | Country | I | II | III | IV | V | Pts |
|---|---|---|---|---|---|---|---|---|---|
| Gold medal | Gem II | Durward Knowles; Sloane Farrington | Bahamas | 6 | 1 | 2 | 2 | 2 | 97 |
| Silver medal | Hilarius | Hilary Smart; Stan Ogilvy | United States | 2 | 6 | 3 | 1 | 5 | 95 |
| Bronze medal | Glider | Richard Stearns; Robert Rodgers | United States | 4 | 3 | 4 | 3 | 4 | 92 |
| 4 | Scout VI | Myron Lehmann; Richard McKibben | United States | 10 | 8 | 9 | 6 | 1 | 76 |
| 5 | Wench III | George Fleitz; Walter Krug | United States | 1 | 4 | 5 | DSQ | 6 | 72 |
| 6 | Cene | Charles Ross; Robertson Ross | United States | 7 | 13 | 11 | 4 | 3 | 72 |
| 7 | Tom Tom | T. O. Scripps Jr. Charles de Long | United States | 3 | 5 | 7 | 9 | 15 | 71 |
| 8 | Sugar Rabbit | Owen Torrey; R. Rich | United States | 9 | 10 | 6 | 8 | 12 | 65 |
| 9 | Can Can | Frank Wooser; J. McAleese | United States | 5 | 7 | 8 | DSA | 8 | 60 |
| 10 | Faneca | Duarte de Almeida Bello; Fernando Bello | Portugal | 18 | 9 | 10 | 5 | 11 | 57 |
| 11 | Blue Star II | Robert Lippincott; Robert Levin | United States | 8 | DSQ | 1 | WDR | 7 | 50 |
| 12 | Sparkler III | J. Cleary; J. Cleary Jr. | United States | 12 | 12 | 12 | 11 | 13 | 50 |
| 13 | Clear Sky | P. Miller; S. Miller | Canada | 11 | DSA | 14 | 7 | 10 | 46 |
| 14 | Kathleen | Herbert Williams; Carl Ohgren | United States | WDR | 2 | 13 | WDR | 9 | 42 |
| 15 | Lochinvar | R. Cameron; J. Tilton | United States | 17 | 14 | 15 | 12 | 16 | 36 |
| 16 | Pupule | F. Rothwell; P. Hagen | United States | 13 | 11 | 18 | WDR | 14 | 32 |
| 17 | Buscape | João José Bracony; Carlos Bittencourt Filho | Brazil | 14 | 18 | 20 | 10 | 18 | 30 |
| 18 | Rebel | H. Burrall; W. Smith | United States | 20 | 15 | 17 | 13 | 17 | 28 |
| 19 | Rique | C. Borden; E. Wehn | United States | 15 | 17 | 16 | WDR | 20 | 20 |
| 20 | Aquila | G. Criminale; R. Hires | United States | 19 | 16 | 19 | WDR | 19 | 15 |
| 21 | Tomahawk | N. Marchuk; C. Paul | United States | 16 | WDR | WDR | 14 | 21 | 15 |

Legend: DSA – Disabled; DSQ – Disqualified; WDR – Withdrew;
