= 1961 Star World Championship =

Sailing regatta championship

Event title
- Edition: 39th

Event details
- Venue: San Diego, United States
- Yachts: Star
- Titles: 1

Competitors
- Competitors: 52
- Competing nations: 7

Results
- (gold) Gold: (United States) Buchan & Knight
- (silver) Silver: (United States) Bennett & McKeague
- (bronze) Bronze: (United States) North & Skahill

The 1961 Star World Championship was held in San Diego, United States in 1961.

== Results ==
Results of individual races
Pos	Boat name	Crew	Country	I	II	III	IV	V	Tot
Gold medal	Frolic	Bill Buchan Jr. Douglas Knight	United States	1	1	1	6	1	125
Silver medal	Tranquil	John W. Bennett; John McKeague	United States	6	2	2	8	6	111
Bronze medal	North Star IV	Lowell North; Thomas Skahill	United States	2	3	10	9	2	109
4	Tyrant	William Twist; Morgan L. Morgan	United States	3	9	4	7	8	104
5	Gemini	Richard G. Hahn; Ted Monroe	United States	8	7	8	11	3	98
6	Gem VIII	Durward Knowles; Sloane Farrington	Bahamas	4	6	WDR	2	4	92
7	Glider	Richard Stearns; Lynn Williams	United States	7	4	18	10	5	91
8	Shrew	William Parks; Robert Halperin	United States	10	8	3	12	12	90
9	Mouette	Donald Bever; William Beattie	United States	5	22	5	3	15	85
10	Duet	Owen P. Merrill; Frank Hogg	United States	11	5	12	20	7	80
11	Creepy II	Foster Clarke; Maurice Kelly	Bahamas	13	14	9	17	9	73
12	Cetus	Bonar Davis; William Mahy	Canada	16	10	11	4	22	72
13	Flamingo IV	Paul Woodbury; Barry Stevens	United States	19	12	17	5	10	72
14	Soiree	Jack Streeton; Lance Morton	United States	9	17	22	1	14	72
15	Siren	Donald J. Trask; James de Witt	United States	21	11	15	15	17	56
16	Poky	Eugene Pennell; Robert Andre	Canada	17	15	7	23	18	55
17	Ariel	Alan C. Holt; Jay Winberg	United States	24	DNF	6	13	13	52
18	Chatterbox	Michel Gautier; Fernand Thieck	Morocco	18	16	16	26	11	48
19	Shadow II	Carlos de Cárdenas; James Reynolds	Cuba	12	23	13	25	21	41
20	Desiree	Charles H. Dole; Cy Gillette	United States	14	21	14	22	23	41
21	Prelude II	Ray Fiedler; Eustace Vynn Jr.	United States	15	24	19	18	19	40
22	Ninotchka	Peter Dirk Siemsen; Jorge Pontual	Brazil	22	DNF	23	14	16	33
23	Flambeau	Miles P. Wynn; Eric Nelson	United States	23	20	20	16	25	31
24	Ouija	John Scarborough; John Rumsey	United States	20	18	DNF	21	20	29
25	Boomerang	W. J. Froome; T. M. Boland	United States	26	19	21	19	24	26
26	Nausikaa	Carlos Braniff; Felipe Mier	Mexico	25	13	24	24	26	23

Legend: DNF – Did not finish; WDR – Withdrew;
