= 1951 Star World Championship =

World Championship

Event title
- Edition: 29th

Event details
- Venue: Gibson Island, United States
- Yachts: Star
- Titles: 1

Competitors
- Competitors: 98
- Competing nations: 7

Results
- (gold) Gold: (United States) Etchells & Etchells
- (silver) Silver: (United States) Stearns & Rodgers
- (bronze) Bronze: (United States) Ogilvy & Stueck

The 1951 Star World Championship was held at Gibson Island, United States in 1951.

== Results ==
Results of individual races
Pos	Boat name	Crew	Country	I	II	III	IV	V	Pts
Gold medal	Shannon	E. W. Etchells; Mary Etchells	United States	5	5	5	2	6	227
Silver medal	Magic	Richard Stearns; Robert Rodgers	United States	1	2	11	4	2	226
Bronze medal	Flame	Stan Ogilvy; Whitney Stueck	United States	2	3	22	5	9	209
4	Hilarius	Hilary Smart; Paul Smart	United States	12	17	2	10	8	201
5	Comanche	Jack Price; John Reid	United States	8	31	12	8	3	188
6	Merope	Agostino Straulino; Nicolò Rode	Italy	6	1	26	31	1	181
7	Sea Robin	Robert Lippincott; Ray Lippincott	United States	4	18	40	1	11	176
8	Hell's Angel	August Stoeffler; R. Stoeffler	United States	13	15	17	13	16	176
9	Jade	Duarte de Almeida Bello; Fernando Bello	Portugal	10	8	11	16	30	171
10	Gale	Harry Gale Nye Jr. Stanley Fahlstrom	United States	14	19	24	6	12	171
11	Gem III	Durward Knowles; D. Pritchard	Bahamas	7	13	3	DSQ	4	173
12	White Shadow	William Myers; Paul Cox	United States	9	11	1	DSA	19	160
13	Mate	Theodore Clark; J. Bell	United States	19	7	18	23	17	156
14	Luscious Too	Donald Bever; R. Miller	United States	DSQ	9	7	9	20	151
15	Gam	Philippe Chancerel; J. Lebrun	France	11	12	38	14	24	151
16	Wench II	Hartwell Moore; E. Prime	United States	31	21	4	21	10	151
17	Chuckle	Harold Halsted; Ernst Pfrunder	United States	11	27	9	11	31	149
18	Pagan	D. Jones; M. Wynn	United States	27	20	28	12	18	141
19	Cygnet	C. Dominy; J. Dominy	United States	DNS	6	34	11	7	142
20	North Star II	Lowell North; Brian Hanzal	United States	DSQ	4	WDR	3	5	138
21	Pirene	F. Zemina; C. Storms	United States	18	24	43	17	11	133
22	Dariabar	W. Taylor; R. Christensen	United States	21	34	8	33	22	132
23	Boomerang	John K. Todd; W. Norris Jr.	United States	20	22	20	19	38	131
24	Not Given	H. Witte; W. Lawhorn	United States	21	14	21	22	39	129
25	Stampede	George Dewar; Walter Flynn	United States	26	38	13	20	21	128
26	Kurush	Carlos de Cárdenas; Carlos de Cárdenas Jr.	Cuba	3	26	37	7	WDR	127
27	Zippity	A. Karlson; J. Karlson	United States	31	23	19	32	21	124
28	Snallygaster	C. Stein III; J. Nelson III	United States	22	37	14	18	37	122
29	Twinkle	W. Hanson; R. Whyte	United States	16	31	31	27	26	111
30	Dody	Paul Woodbury; E. Hay	United States	40	30	6	36	34	104
31	Delight	R. Kirkland; T. Tranfaglia	United States	28	32	23	DSQ	14	103
32	Lochinvar	R. Cameron; J. Sennott	United States	17	39	41	26	29	94
33	Trigger	B. Waddell; J. Huntley	United States	42	41	32	30	13	92
34	Nihot III	F. Tobin; J. Frey	United States	37	28	30	34	31	90
35	Sampson	Willard Hodges; F. Gordon	United States	32	29	47	28	27	87
36	Gem II	C. Sansoldo; Ernani Simoes	Brazil	23	WDR	10	40	40	87
37	Shooting Star	Stan Lippincott; J. Knight	United States	19	16	33	DSA	DNS	82
38	Renaissance	R. Craton; W. Ester	United States	34	33	36	38	28	78
39	Draco II	P. Hunt; S. Biays	United States	WDR	WDR	27	21	23	79
40	Where Is It	P. Barsolas; V. Grant	United States	33	21	29	41	WDR	76
41	Kahuna	Richard Miller; R. Villiers	United States	36	40	42	24	33	75
42	Tulla	Jul Hansen; Joseph Smyth	United States	41	WDR	25	31	32	71
43	Naiad	D. Spangler; C. Bertcher	United States	39	10	44	WDR	42	65
44	Para I	R. Riethmiller; G. Sales	United States	45	44	16	42	WDR	53
45	Mibouhay	E. Towl; D. Schultheis	United States	43	42	31	WDR	36	48
46	The Chain	D. Hubers; R. McVey	United States	24	DSA	DSQ	29	DNS	47
47	Thistle	Alex Allardyce; A. Robertson	United States	30	36	39	WDR	DNS	45
48	Aquila	G. Criminale; F. Harrison	United States	38	WDR	46	37	41	38
49	Fawn	C. Stewart Jr. H. Mahaffy	United States	44	43	41	39	WDR	33

Legend: DNS – Did not start; DSA – Disabled; DSQ – Disqualified; WDR – Withdrew;
