= 1949 Star World Championship =

Event title
- Edition: 27th

Event details
- Venue: Chicago, United States
- Yachts: Star
- Titles: 1

Competitors
- Competitors: 80
- Competing nations: 6

Results
- (gold) Gold: (United States) Nye & Fahlstrom
- (silver) Silver: (United States) Lippincott & Levin
- (bronze) Bronze: (United States) Ogilvy & Torrey

The 1949 Star World Championship was held in Chicago, United States in 1949.

== Results ==
Results of individual races
Pos	Boat name	Crew	Country	I	II	III	IV	V	Pts
Gold medal	Gale	Harry Gale Nye Jr. Stanley Fahlstrom	United States	4	4	4	3	8	182
Silver medal	Blue Star II	Robert Lippincott; Robert Levin	United States	8	3	6	1	10	177
Bronze medal	Flame	Stan Ogilvy; Owen Torrey	United States	7	14	3	10	2	169
4	Magic	C. E. Rogers Jr. Rogers	United States	3	10	7	16	4	165
5	North Star II	Lowell North; James B. Hill	United States	1	DSQ	1	2	1	159
6	Duchess	W. M. Shehan; K. Jones	United States	10	6	10	11	9	155
7	Luscious	Donald Bever; C. Voss	United States	12	12	9	11	11	150
8	Sanderling	John W. Bennett; W. Campbell	United States	11	7	15	4	22	146
9	Cancan	Frank Wosser; Richard Ownes	United States	9	8	21	7	14	146
10	Touche	Robert Jill; J. R. Slater	United States	2	16	17	9	16	145
11	Flo	A. Grosvenor; R. McGlohm	United States	5	22	13	17	5	143
12	Shooting Star	Durward Knowles; Sloane Farrington	Bahamas	6	WDR	5	5	13	135
13	Dorris	Donald Coley; Richard Gordon	United States	21	11	19	6	20	128
14	Finesse	Robert Ferguson; R. C. Ferguson	United States	15	19	8	19	17	127
15	Scout VI	Darby Metcalf; F. Schenck	United States	12	15	18	21	12	126
16	Chuckle	Harold Halsted; W. Halsted	United States	16	9	11	WDR	6	122
17	Twin Star	Lockwood Pirie; Sam Pirie	United States	DSQ	2	2	WDR	3	116
18	Alcor	E. Vynne Jr. R. Watt	United States	14	27	14	14	26	110
19	Havoc	H. Stephenson; R. Lorenz	United States	20	28	30	8	16	104
20	Lynx	Theodore Clark; E. Schelin	United States	38	5	16	13	34	99
21	Typhoon	Jack Price; E. Navarro	United States	23	13	20	WDR	18	90
22	Snowflake	Ronald Blizzard; Francis Wolfe	United States	28	1	26	WDR	21	88
23	Thistle II	Alex Allardyce; A. Robertson	United States	27	32	23	31	7	85
24	Picket	J. Forrington; E. McCord	United States	31	26	22	18	27	81
25	Kurush III	Carlos de Cárdenas; Jorge de Cárdenas	Cuba	32	17	37	12	28	79
26	Scylla	Charles Ulmer; Walter Flynn	United States	18	20	24	DSA	24	78
27	Capucho IV	João Félix Capucho; A. Heredia	Portugal	19	DSQ	12	24	32	77
28	Urchin	J. Killeen Jr. Miles Wynn	United States	17	23	34	21	31	71
29	Fracas	Edward Fraker; H. Durkee	United States	24	21	29	DSA	19	69
30	Flamingo III	Paul Woodbury; J. Smollett	United States	22	24	25	DSA	25	68
31	Laminar	Fred Macks; Ray Full	United States	21	30	32	27	29	62
32	Xodo III	Roberto Bueno; J. Bittencourt	Brazil	35	33	31	23	23	60
33	Desira	Donald Birks; Harold Lankton	United States	30	29	27	20	WDR	18
34	Barbarbee	Charles Ruble; R. Williams	United States	29	DSQ	28	22	30	15
35	Pasha	George Dewar; Harry Riddle	United States	34	21	36	30	39	41
36	Nike	Robert Taylor; W. Weatherly	United States	33	31	39	26	37	39
37	Leatherstocking	W. Smith Jr. R. Armitage	United States	24	DSA	38	29	31	38
38	Para I	R. Riethmiller; F. Runnells	United States	37	31	33	28	38	34
39	Lady Veeco	Clement Korb; Sterling Potter	United States	39	18	40	WDR	33	34
40	Ripple	W. Spencer; T. McEnvoy	Canada	36	34	31	WDR	36	23

Legend: DSA – Disabled; DSQ – Disqualified; WDR – Withdrew;
