= 1946 Star World Championship =

Coordinates: 23°9′11.9″N 82°21′47.8″W

Event title
- Edition: 24th

Event details
- Venue: Havana, Cuba
- Yachts: Star
- Titles: 1

Competitors
- Competitors: 52
- Competing nations: 6

Results
- (gold) Gold: (United States) Fleitz & Krug
- (silver) Silver: (United States) White & Holcombe
- (bronze) Bronze: (The Bahamas) Knowles & Kelly

The 1946 Star World Championship was held in Havana, Cuba in 1946.

== Results ==
Results of individual races
Pos	Boat name	Crew	Country	I	II	III	IV	V	Pts
Gold medal	Wench II	George Fleitz; Walter Krug	United States	3	3	1	3	4	131
Silver medal	Pagan	Robert White; Gordon Holcombe	United States	4	6	6	4	2	123
Bronze medal	Gem II	Durward Knowles; Basil Kelly	Bahamas	2	1	7	7	8	120
4	Blue Star II	Robert Lippincott; Robert Levin	United States	14	8	4	2	1	116
5	Pilot	Harry Gale Nye Jr. Stanley Fahlstrom	United States	6	19	11	1	3	105
6	Kurush III	Carlos de Cárdenas; C. Inclan	Cuba	7	4	9	12	10	103
7	Shillalah	E. W. Etchells; Mary Etchells	United States	1	2	10	6	WDR	97
8	Scout	Gus Lorber; Edward Leverich	United States	9	9	2	9	21	95
9	Scylla	Charles Ulmer; J. Forrington	United States	11	13	18	11	11	81
10	Chuckle	Harold Halsted; W. Halsted	United States	5	7	16	8	WDR	80
11	Capucho	João Félix Capucho; J. Crespo	Portugal	13	14	5	WDR	9	75
12	Kittiwake	W. Hutton; J. Hutton	United States	16	10	8	14	22	75
13	Scout V	Myron Lehmann; Robert Ziegler	United States	WDR	5	3	DSA	5	74
14	Flamingo II	Paul Woodbury; W. Trayes	United States	17	18	14	13	20	63
15	Aria II	H. Wilmer; R. Jones	United States	10	12	17	16	WDR	61
16	Honey	Dan Morrell; Morrell	United States	12	17	13	19	23	61
17	Flooy	Charles H. Dole; P. Dean	United States	15	WDR	19	5	19	58
18	Zoa II	C. Baker; P. Farley	United States	18	15	WDR	15	13	55
19	Nashira	Willard Hodges; John McCrillis	United States	WDR	22	15	17	15	47
20	Gusty	R. Rogers; A. Barber	United States	WDR	21	WDR	10	14	42
21	Melody	Paul Smart; R. Allen	United States	WDR	DSA	12	WDR	6	40
22	Toro	Ernani Simoes; A. Simoes	Brazil	DSA	DNS	21	18	12	36
23	Dream	G. Drircoll; G. Jessop	United States	WDR	16	DNS	DNS	7	35
24	Fifinella	Cebern Lee; W. Calkins	United States	WDR	20	20	DNS	17	30
25	Little Dipper	G. Criminale; S. S. Tam	United States	WDR	DNS	DNS	21	16	21
26	Viking III	Joseph Smyth; D. Campbell	United States	8	DSA	WDR	DSA	DNS	21
27	Conan Berri	Antonio de Zulueta de Zulueta	Spain	WDR	WDR	DSA	20	18	20
28	Viking II	Joaquim Fiúza; Júlio Gourinho	Portugal	WDR	11	DSA	DNS	DNS	18

Legend: DNS – Did not start; DSA – Disabled; WDR – Withdrew;
