= C. Stanley Ogilvy =

American mathematician (1913–2000)

Charles Stanley Ogilvy (1913–2000) was an American mathematician, sailor, and author. He was a professor of mathematics at Hamilton College (New York), and a frequent competitor at the Star World Championships. His many books include works on both mathematics and sailing.

== Sailing ==
Ogilvy grew up sailing near New Rochelle, New York, on the mainland side of the Long Island Sound. Beginning in 1931 he crewed for Howard McMichael on the two-man Star class Grey Fox, and in 1934 he bought the boat and renamed it the Jay. He won over 47 regattas, and was a frequent competitor in the Star World Championships; his best finishes were second in 1947 (crewing for Hilary Smart) and third in 1949 and 1951 (both with his own boat, Flame). Later, he also sailed Etchells.

Ogilvy belonged to the Larchmont Yacht Club for 62 years, and served as its historian. He was the first vice president of the International Star Class Yacht Racing Association, edited its publications for many years, and also served as historian for the class.

In 1990, Ogilvy was the second recipient of the Harry Nye Memorial Trophy of the International Star Class Yacht Racing Association, in recognition of his contributions to Star class sailing. The C. Stanley Ogilvy Masters Trophy, an antique sextant awarded to a sailor over the age of 50, was named in his honor and has been presented annually by the Etchells World Championships since 1999.

== Education and career ==
Ogilvy went to the Berkshire School, then did his undergraduate studies at Williams College. During World War II, his bad eyesight preventing him from serving in the Navy; instead he became the commander of a rescue boat on the Pacific Front for the U.S. Army. After earning an M.A. from Cambridge University and an M.S. at Columbia University, and doing additional studies at Princeton University, Ogilvy finished his graduate studies with a PhD in mathematics from Syracuse University in 1954. His thesis, supervised by Walter R. Baum, was entitled An Investigation of Some Properties of Asymptotic Lines on Surfaces of Negative Gaussian Curvature.

Ogilvy began his teaching career at Trinity College (Connecticut), and joined the faculty of Hamilton College (New York) in 1953. He chaired the mathematics department beginning in 1969, and was a fellow of the American Association for the Advancement of Science. He remained at Hamilton until 1974, when he retired so that he could spend more of his time sailing.

Ogilvy died on June 21, 2000, in Mamaroneck, New York.

== Books ==
Ogilvy wrote many books on both mathematics and sailing, which were translated into several other languages. They include:

- Successful Yacht Racing (Norton, 1951)
- Through the Mathescope (Oxford Univ. Press, 1956). Later republished as Excursions in Mathematics.
- Tomorrow's Math: Unsolved Problems for the Amateur (Oxford Univ. Press, 1962)
- Thoughts on Small Boat Racing (Van Nostrand, 1966)
- Excursions in Number Theory (with John T. Anderson, Oxford Univ. Press, 1966)
- Excursions in Geometry (Oxford Univ. Press, 1969)
- Win More Sailboat Races (Norton, 1976)
- A History of the Star Class: The First Eighty Years (International Star Class Yacht Racing Association, 1991)
- The Larchmont Yacht Club: A History, 1880–1990 (Larchmont Yacht Club, 1993)
