= Mersea (brand) =

American lifestyle clothing brand

Mer-Sea & Co.
- Type: Private
- Industry: Retail, apparel
- Founded: 2013; 13 years ago
- Founders: Melanie Bolin; Lina Dickinson
- Headquarters: Lenexa, Kansas, U.S.
- Products: Travel clothing, sleepwear, candles, gifts
- Website: mersea.com

Mersea (also known as Mer-Sea & Co.) is an American lifestyle brand based in the Kansas City metropolitan area that designs travel-themed clothing, sleepwear, candles, and gifts. The company was founded in 2013 by Melanie Bolin and Lina Dickinson. Its first permanent store opened on the Country Club Plaza in Kansas City in 2026, the same year the brand released a sleepwear collection designed in collaboration with the actress Selma Blair.

== History ==
Bolin and Dickinson met through their children and founded the company in 2013. Its first products were wrap-style layers designed for travel, and in the early years, the brand grew quick enough to be put at No. 279 on the 2018 Inc. 5000 list of the fastest-growing private companies in the United States. In 2022, the company reported $15 million in revenue and released a broader ready-to-wear clothing line. More than 1000 stores in the United States, including Anthropologie and Lands' End, carried its products. Mersea started to manufacture denim in 2023.

The same year, mittens made by Mersea were highlighted in Oprah Winfrey's "Favorite Things" holiday list, and in early 2024, the home fragrance company Pura released a three-scent collection developed with Mersea for its smart diffusers.

After Selma Blair was diagnosed with multiple sclerosis in 2018, Mersea founders sent her a gift of pajamas and candles during her treatment, which started their mutual association. The company released Sea La Vie, a limited-edition sleepwear capsule created with Blair in April 2026 as its first celebrity collaboration. The collection was designed in the United States and manufactured in India and China. The company's first permanent store opened on the Country Club Plaza in Kansas City in June 2026, and Blair joined the founders for the occasion.
