= St. Patrick High School (Chicago) =

High school in Chicago

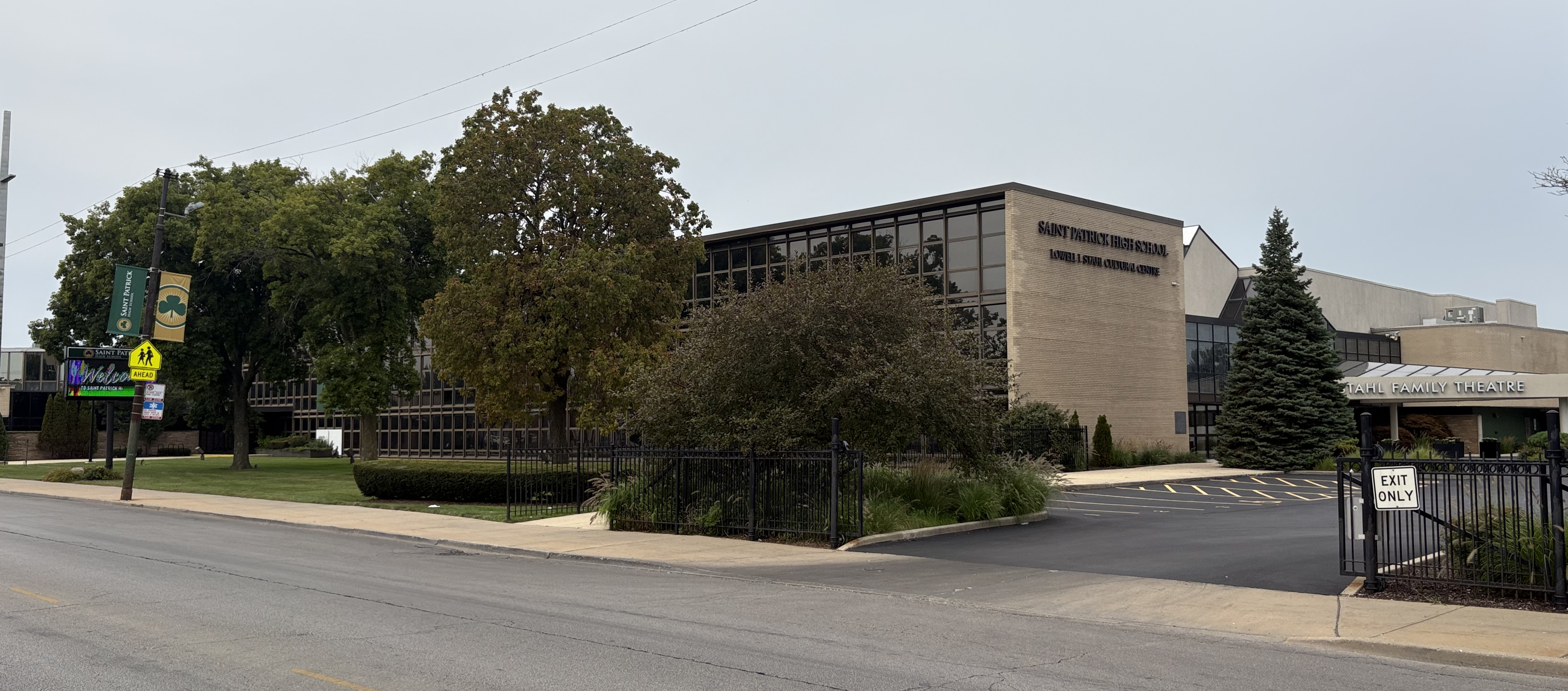

Location
- 5900 West Belmont Avenue; Chicago, Illinois 60634; United States; 41.939166°N 87.77472°W

Information
- Type: Private
- Motto: Latin: Religio Mores Cultura; English: Religion • Morals • Culture
- Religious affiliations: Roman Catholic (Christian Brothers)
- Patron saints: Saint Patrick; Saint John Baptiste de La Salle
- Established: 1861; 165 years ago
- Oversight: Archdiocese of Chicago
- President: Daniel A. Santucci
- Principal: John Harrington
- Staff: 31
- Faculty: 64
- Grades: 9-12
- Gender: Boys
- Enrollment: ~600 (2025-2026)
- Average class size: 25
- Campus: urban
- Campus type: closed campus
- Colors: Green and Gold
- Slogan: "Taking you where you want to go"; "Tradition starts here"; "Faith, Tradition, Brotherhood"
- Fight song: Grand Old School
- Athletics conference: CCL
- Mascot: Shamrocks
- Nickname: Shamrocks
- Rivals: Notre Dame College Prep
- Newspaper: Green and Gold
- Tuition: US$14,200
- Academic Affiliations: North Central Association of Colleges and Schools
- Website: www.stpatrick.org

St. Patrick High School is an all-boys college preparatory Catholic high school located in the Belmont-Cragin neighborhood on the northwest side of Chicago, Illinois. Opened in 1861, it is among the oldest continuously open high schools in the Chicago area.

== History ==
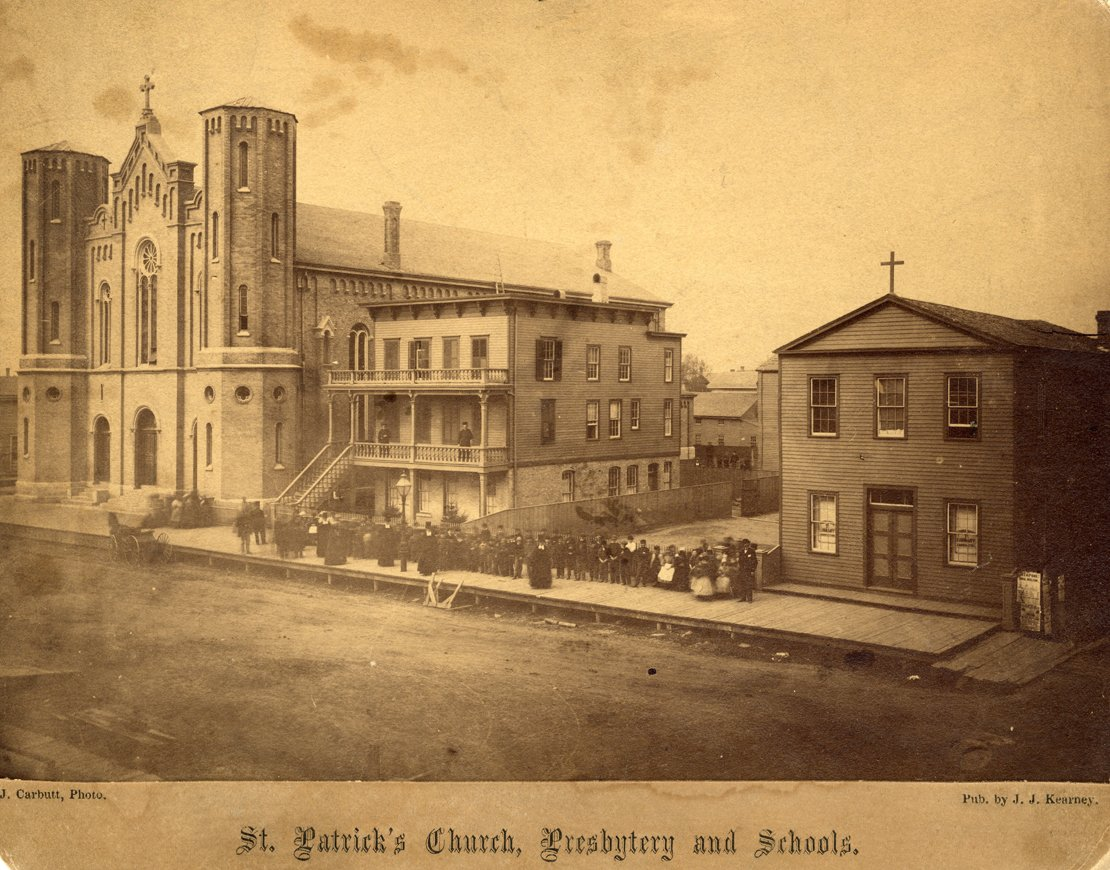
The original St. Patrick Academy on the far right

The original school, St. Patrick Academy, was opened by the Christian Brothers near Adams Street and Des Plaines. In 1953, the school moved to its current site, on Belmont and Austin avenues. The student population was bigger than anticipated, which required almost immediate addition to the new structure; a construction project completed for the 1956–57 school year, which became known as the "Round Building" due to its cylindrical shape.

In 1991, one floor of the school was redeveloped as a computer center. After a long term fundraising effort, further addition and remodeling took place with the addition of an atrium, theater, music facilities, media center, and a second smaller gymnasium.

In the 2010s and 2020s, several more improvements were made, with the 1991 computer center being redesigned again as a single computer lab, along with a separate "lab" to house the school's INCubator EDU program. The basement of the Round Building was further renovated in 2022–2023 as an Engineering lab. That same year, the school Library was renovated and became the Barret Learning Resource Center and includes a redesigned library space along with an E-Sports room.

== Academics ==
St. Patrick's academic offerings over the years have changed significantly. Prior to the 1990s, the school offered 3 levels of classes: General Studies, College Prep, and Honors, and students were placed in tracks for all their classes. Later on, the school opened up the schedule so that students could take different courses at different levels for their subjects, and the General Studies program was renamed "College Prep Phoenix" while the previous College Prep classes became "College Prep De la Salle". In the 2020s, the program for students who need additional academic support was again renamed as the "Blessed Brother James Miller Learning Resource Program" and the Phoenix level of courses was abolished. Saint Patrick currently offers 3 levels of courses: College Prep, Honors, and AP or Dual Credit. 30 Advanced Placement or Dual Credit courses are offered through the College Board or partnerships with college and universities.

== Student life ==
=== Non-athletic activities ===
The school also has an academic team, a chess team, band, FIRST Robotics Competition, and dance. The chess team finished second in the IHSA state chess tournament in 1977 and tied for third in 2008. The chess team has had multiple state tournament appearances, and has developed a friendly rivalry with St. Ignatius College Prep.

The cheerleading squad is composed of girls from nearby all-girls schools who choose to try out.

=== Theatre department ===
The school's Theatre Department stages one play in the fall, one student play in the winter, one musical in the spring, and one miscellaneous play in the summer as part of its Community Theater Initiative. The school's theatre, the Stahl Family Theatre, is partnered with the Chicago Kids Theatre Company for it being one of the most technologically advanced theaters in the Chicago area.

== Athletics ==
St. Patrick's athletic teams are named the Shamrocks. The school participates in the Chicago Catholic League (CCL) for most of their sports, which include baseball, basketball, bowling, cross country, football, golf, soccer, swimming & diving, tennis, track & field, volleyball, water polo, and wrestling. The school also sponsors teams in bowling, swimming & diving, and water polo which are not sponsored by the ESCC. All of these sports have state tournaments sponsored by the Illinois High School Association (IHSA).

The following teams have placed in the top four of their respective IHSA sponsored state championship tournaments:

- Baseball: 2nd (2005–2006)
- Water Polo: 2nd (2002–2003)
- Volleyball: 4th (2008–2009)
- Soccer: 4th (2017–2018)
- Soccer: 4th (2019–2020)
- Bowling: 4th (2019–2020)
- Basketball: 3rd (2024-2025)

=== Basketball ===
In 1932 St. Patrick (at the time called St. Patrick Academy) won the National Catholic Interscholastic Basketball Tournament. The tournament was hosted by Loyola University, and it invited high schools from across the country, including top teams in New York, Texas, and Indiana, all of which were considered powerhouse states for basketball at the high school level. St. Patrick was originally not invited to play in the tournament, but was called in last minute as a substitute when an originally schedule team could not make the tournament.

The national champion Shamrocks defeated the now closed St. Mel (Chicago) Knights 22–20. A young Ray Meyer, famous DePaul University men's basketball coach, lead the Shamrocks with 12 points.

In 1949 St. Patrick captured the Chicago City Championship crown, which had the Chicago Public League champion against the Chicago Catholic League champion.

St. Patrick defeated Leo High School 47-35 securing them their first Chicago Catholic League title. St. Patrick had to play Tilden High School, the Chicago Public League champion, for the City Championship. At Chicago Stadium the Shamrocks upset Tilden 54–53. The Shamrocks trailed throughout the majority of the game, but were able to take the lead in the final minute, and completed the historic upset.

=== Water polo ===
The 90's and early 2000's treated the Shamrocks well in terms of water polo. The team won multiple competitions, with dominant winning seasons. The Shamrocks had multiple state finals appearances, and one state title. The water polo team won the ISA (Illinois Swimming Association) state title in 1997, going 28–0. This was not an IHSA sponsored title, as water polo only became an IHSA sponsored sport in 2001.

== Notable alumni and attendees ==
- Xavier Pinson (2014–2017) is a college basketball player for Louisiana State University. He previously played for the University of Missouri.
- Bill Keating (1963), trial attorney and former defensive tackle and guard for the Denver Broncos and Miami Dolphins
- Raymond J. Leopold, Ph.D. (1963) Retired Air Force Lieutenant Colonel; Former Motorola Vice President and Chief Technical Officer; and MIT Professor of Aerospace Systems. Holder of 27 patents, he served on a team of three engineers who conceived, developed and implemented the Iridium Satellite-Based Telecommunications System, honored in an exhibit in the Smithsonian Air and Space Museum.
- Tim McGarigle (2002) Northwestern University Wildcats Defensive Coordinator. Former NFL Player for the St. Louis Rams. Former linebacker for the Northwestern Wildcats
- Ray Meyer (1933) was DePaul men's basketball coach (1942–84) and 1979 inductee to the Basketball Hall of Fame
- John G. Mulroe (1977), lawyer and Democratic Party Illinois state senator
- Joe Rau, international level Greco-Roman wrestler
- New Colony Six (1964): 5 of the 6 founding members of the band are 1964 graduates: Chic James (James Chitkowski), Ray Graffia, Wally Kemp, Pat McBride and Gerry Van Kollenberg.
- Dan Santucci (2002) is a former offensive lineman for the Cincinnati Bengals. Former offensive lineman for the Notre Dame Fighting Irish. Current school president (2021–Present)
- Jacob Zachar (2004) is an actor (Rusty on the TV series Greek).
- Brian Wheeler (1979) is a former Chicago radio announcer and former NBA announcer, mostly with Portland Trail Blazers until health problems made him retire in 2019.

== Notable faculty ==
- Robert Halperin coached football at St. Patrick. He was an Olympic (bronze) and Pan American Games (gold) yachting medalist, Wisconsin and Notre Dame and NFL football player, one of Chicago's most-decorated World War II heroes, and Chairman of Commercial Light Co.
