= Gary Comer =

American entrepreneur and clothing retailer

Gary Campbell Comer (December 10, 1927 – October 4, 2006) was the founder of mail order clothing retailer Lands' End.

== Early life ==
Born on the South Side of Chicago in the Grand Crossing neighborhood, Comer graduated from the Paul Revere Elementary School in 1942 and Hyde Park High School in 1946. From 1950 to 1960, he worked as a copywriter at Young & Rubicam in Chicago. After quitting, he traveled around Europe for a year, and then, having been an avid sailor from childhood, he began his own business supplying sailing equipment.

== Lands' End ==
In the Spring of 1963, Comer founded Lands' End, along with his close friend Robert Halperin, Richard Stearns, and two of Stearns' employees. They started it originally as a retailer of sailing supplies and equipment (based on a mail order equipment business begun a year earlier). Comer was president until 1990, including following Lands' End's registration as a public company, when he stepped down from active management. He remained a major shareholder until Lands' End was acquired by Sears in 2002.

== Philanthropy ==
Comer was a long-time philanthropist, donating money to causes including children's health care, education and the study of global climate change. He opened the Gary Comer Youth Center which serves as the anchor institution to Gary Comer Middle School and Gary Comer College Prep, a campus of the Noble Network of Charter Schools. In 2011, the Gary Comer Youth Center and Gary Comer College Prep won the Rudy Bruner Award for Urban Excellence silver medal. Comer was a major contributor to the University of Chicago, providing more than $84 million in donations leading to the establishment and expansion of the Comer Children's Hospital at the University of Chicago. He also donated to Columbia University in support of geochemistry research at Lamont-Doherty Earth Observatory. The Gary C. Comer Geochemistry Building at the Lamont Observatory is named in his honor.

== Death ==
Comer succumbed to prostate cancer on October 4, 2006, at his home in Chicago surrounded by his family.
