= Eugene Pennell =

Canadian sailor

Eugene Henry Pennell (16 January 1911 – 31 March 2002) was a Canadian sailor who competed in the 1956 Summer Olympics.
