= Commercial Light Company =

US electrical contractor and engineering company

- Company type: Electrical contractor and engineering company
- Founded: 1915
- Founder: Aaron Halperin
- Headquarters: 245 Fenel Lane, Hillside, Illinois, USA
- Key people: Robert Halperin, former Chairman; Tom Halperin, President
- Number of employees: 250 (2007)

Commercial Light Company is an Illinois electrical contractor and engineering company, which has performed the electrical work for many Chicago buildings. It is located at 245 Fenel Lane, Hillside, Illinois, and is one of the village's largest employers.

== History ==
Aaron Halperin, who immigrated to the United States from Kiev in the 1890s, founded the company in 1915.

The company performed a number of high-profile assignments, including installing lighting systems in Wrigley Field, the John Hancock Center, and O'Hare International Airport. It also lit State Street in Chicago in 1958, making it – according to the Chicago Tribune – the brightest thoroughfare in the world.

In 2007, it had 250 employees.

== Executives ==
Aaron Halperin, its founder, was President of the company. Allan L. Golinkin served as its Secretary and Supervisor of Construction in the early 1920s.

Robert Halperin was an executive of the company. He became the company's President in 1959, and rose to become its Chairman in the 1960s. In 1989, Tom Halperin was its President.
