= Bernardo Silva (sailor) =

Portuguese sailor

Personal information
- Nationality: Portuguese
- Born: 26 September 1935; Cascais, Portugal
- Died: 1997 (aged 61–62)

Sport
- Sport: Sailing

Bernardo Silva (26 September 1935 – 1997) was a Portuguese sailor. He competed in the Finn event at the 1968 Summer Olympics.
