= Rodney Long =

U.S. Civil War soldier and Chicago police officer

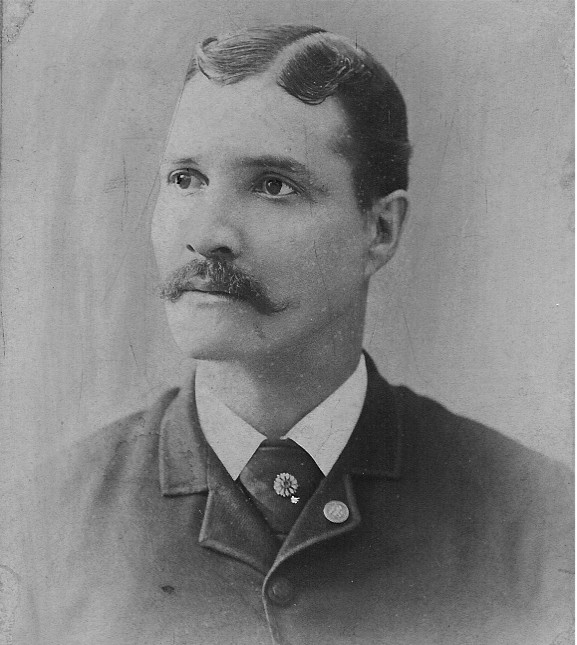
Studio portrait of Rodney Long (1843–1907), an African American Civil War veteran who served as a sergeant in the 29th United States Colored Infantry and later became one of the earliest African American police detectives in Chicago.

Rodney Long was an American Civil War soldier and public official who served as a sergeant in the 29th United States Colored Infantry and later became one of the earliest African American police officers in Chicago. He was wounded and captured during the Battle of the Crater in 1864, survived months of imprisonment at Danville Prison, and returned to Union service before the end of the war. In the postwar period, he joined the Chicago Police Department, where contemporary newspapers and later historians described him as a detective and identified him as either the city's first or second Black police officer.

== Early life ==
Rodney Long was born in 1843 in Hopkinsville, Christian County, Kentucky. Born into slavery in a slaveholding state, he spent his early life enslaved. The circumstances under which he gained his freedom and relocated to Illinois are not documented in surviving records. By the early 1860s, however, he was living in Chicago, where he later enlisted in the Union Army.

== Civil War service ==
In early 1864, Long enlisted in Company B of the 29th United States Colored Infantry, an Illinois-raised regiment of the United States Colored Troops. He attained the rank of sergeant, a noncommissioned officer position that reflected leadership responsibilities within the unit.

Long fought in the Union Army's operations during the Siege of Petersburg and was present at the Battle of the Crater on July 30, 1864. Contemporary accounts and later historical scholarship identify him as having sustained serious injuries during the engagement when a shell exploded near him. Historical scholarship has documented that Confederate forces at the Battle of the Crater killed or executed a number of captured Black Union soldiers following the engagement, reflecting Confederate policy toward African American troops during the later stages of the war. Long was captured by Confederate forces during or immediately following the battle and, unlike many Black soldiers taken prisoner at Petersburg, was imprisoned at Danville Prison in Virginia rather than killed.

While imprisoned, Long and other captured Black Union soldiers endured harsh conditions. Later historical works drawing on pension testimony and survivor accounts record that Long spent approximately seven months in captivity. He was exchanged or otherwise returned to Union lines in early 1865, rejoining his regiment weeks before the surrender of Confederate forces under Robert E. Lee. The 29th United States Colored Infantry subsequently participated in the Appomattox Campaign.

Following the conclusion of major combat operations, the 29th United States Colored Infantry was ordered to Texas as part of the postwar occupation forces. The regiment served under the command of Major General Gordon Granger, whose General Order No. 3 was issued in Galveston on June 19, 1865, announcing the end of slavery in Texas.

Military records indicate that Long remained with the regiment during this period and mustered out of service in Brownsville, Texas, placing him with the 29th United States Colored Infantry during its postwar deployment in the state.

== Postwar career in Chicago ==
After the Civil War, Long returned to civilian life in Chicago, where he held a variety of occupations before entering law enforcement. By the mid-1870s, he had joined the Chicago Police Department.

Contemporary newspaper accounts from the period identified Long as a detective, a designation that in the late nineteenth century denoted seniority and investigative authority rather than entry-level patrol service. His work attracted public attention, including coverage of departmental investigations and internal controversies, indicating that he held a visible and consequential position within the police force.

Long's appointment has been the subject of historical discussion regarding the integration of African Americans into urban police departments. Some contemporary and later accounts described him as the first African American police officer in Chicago, while other historians have identified him as the second, following James L. Shelton. Modern scholarship generally characterizes Long as one of the earliest Black members of the Chicago Police Department and among the first to hold detective-level responsibilities.

== Later life and death ==
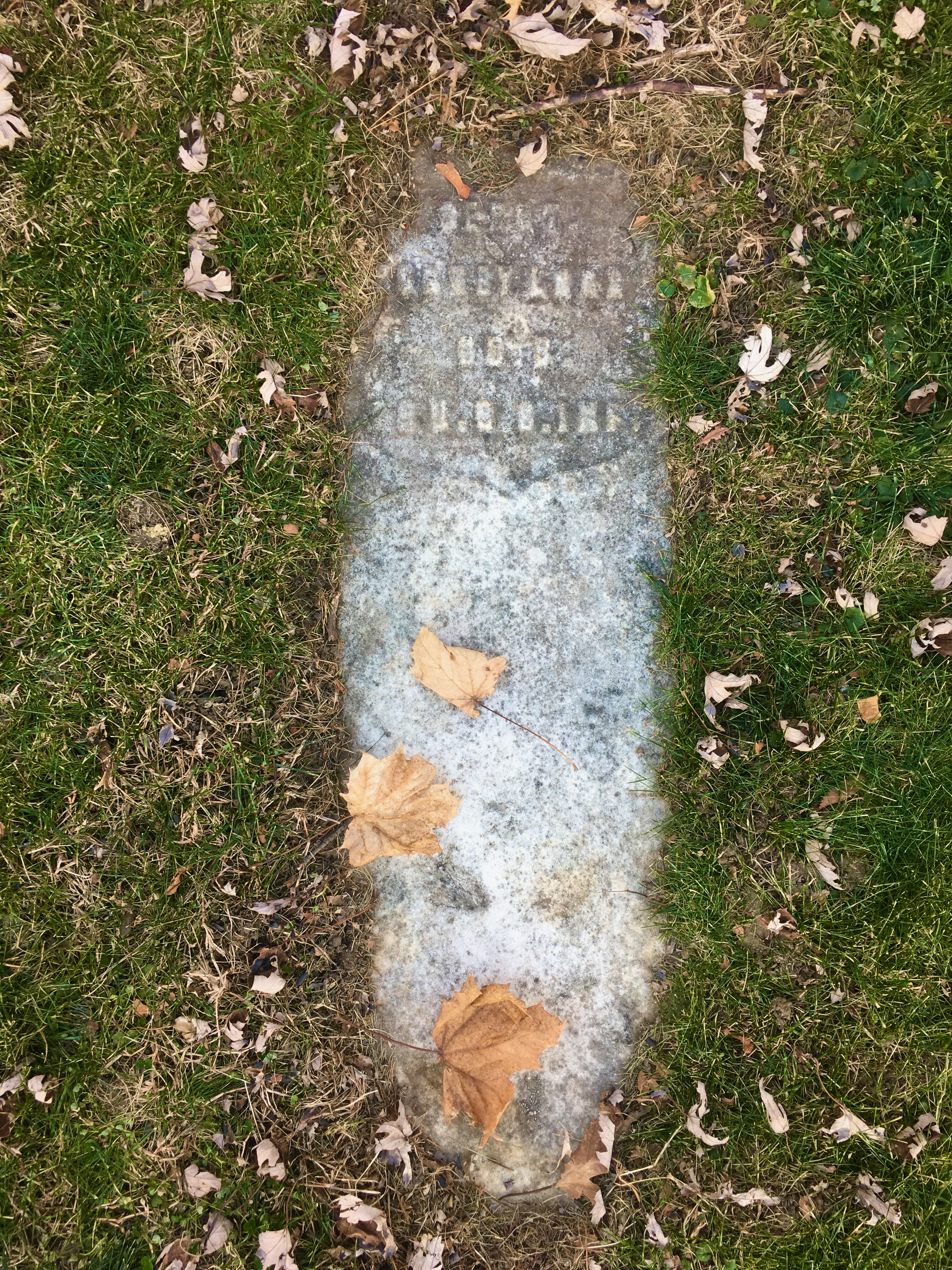
SGT RODNEY LONG CO B 29 U.S.C.T. Headstone marking the grave of Rodney Long (1843–1907), an American Civil War veteran and early African American police detective in Chicago, located at Lincoln Cemetery in Cook County, Illinois.

In addition to his police work, Long was employed in other occupations, including service in the railroad industry, as reflected in pension records and later historical accounts. He remained active within Chicago's Black community during the late nineteenth century.

Rodney Long died in 1907. His Civil War pension file continued to be referenced in subsequent claims and affidavits, reflecting the long-term impact of his wartime injuries and service.

== Legacy ==
Rodney Long's life has been examined by historians of the Civil War, Reconstruction, and Black urban history as illustrative of the transition from enslavement to military service and, later, to positions of civic authority. His experiences as a wounded and imprisoned Black Union soldier at the Battle of the Crater have been cited in scholarly works on the treatment of African American troops and prisoners of war.

In Chicago, Long's postwar career has been remembered in historical studies and newspaper retrospectives as part of the city's early history of Black law enforcement. His service as a detective and his role in the integration of the police department have placed him among the earliest African Americans to exercise formal authority within one of the nation's largest municipal police forces.
