= Kai Bjorn =

Canadian sailor

Personal information
- Born: 13 July 1968 (age 58) Montreal, Quebec, Canada

Sport
- Sport: Sailing

Kai Bjorn (born 13 July 1968) is a Canadian sailor. He competed in the Star event at the 2000 Summer Olympics.
