= João José Bracony =

Brazilian sailor (1919–2016)

Personal information
- Nickname: João José Bracony
- Born: February 19, 1919 Rio de Janeiro, Brazil
- Died: July 3, 2016 (aged 97)

Sailing career
- Sport: Sailing

João José Bracony (February 19, 1919 – July 3, 2016) was a Brazilian Olympic sailor in the Star class. He competed in the 1948 Summer Olympics, where he finished 14th together with Carlos Bittencourt Filho.
