= Carlos Bittencourt =

Brazilian sailor (1930–2010)

Carlos de Melo Bittencourt Filho (18 March 1930 – 12 October 2010) was a Brazilian Olympic sailor in the Star class. He competed in the 1948 Summer Olympics, where he finished 14th together with João José Bracony.
