= Lands' End =

American clothing and furnishings retailer

Lands' End, Inc.

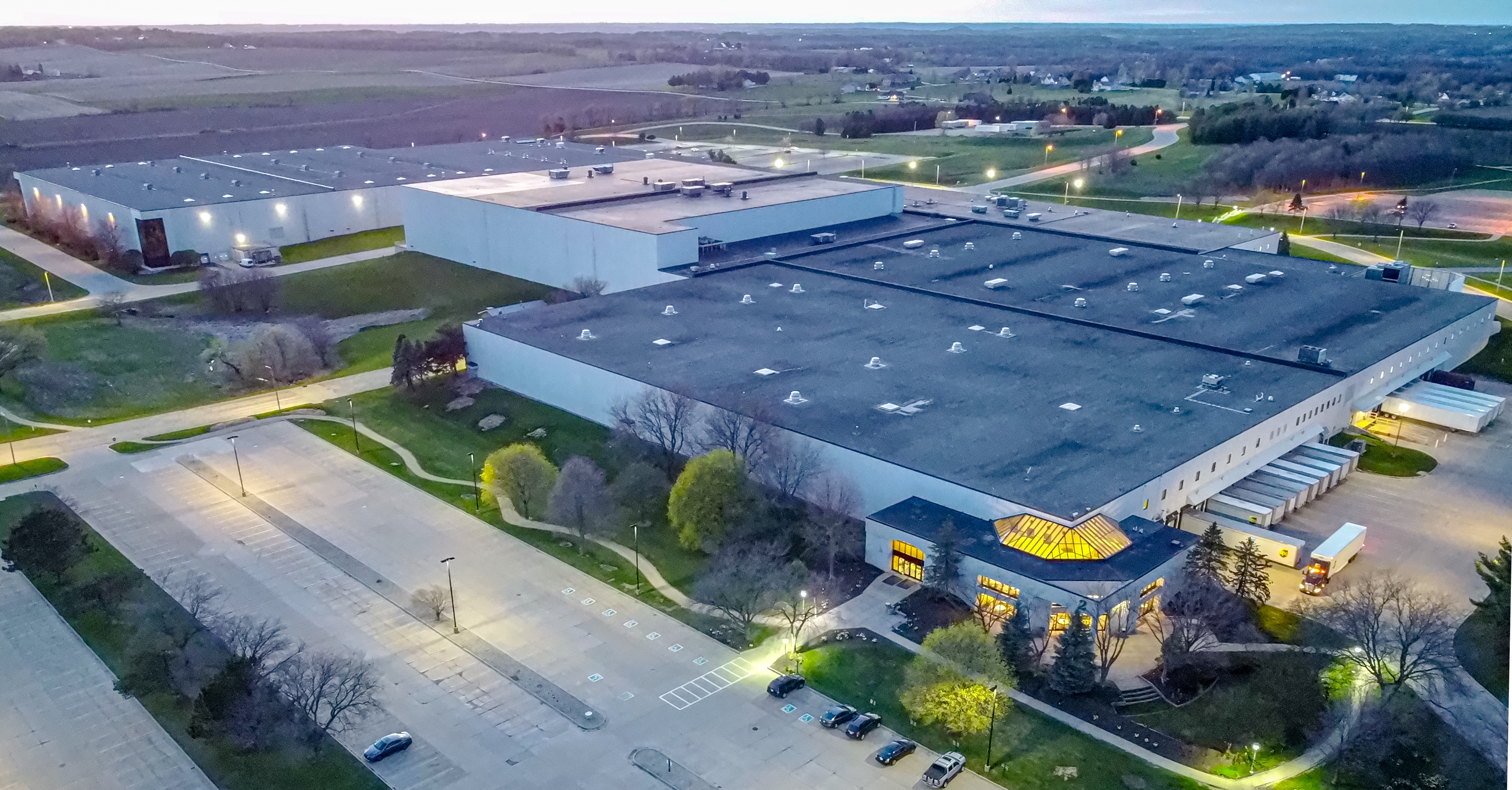
- Corporate office in Dodgeville, Wisconsin
- Type: Public
- Traded as: Nasdaq: LE
- Industry: Retail
- Founded: 1963; 63 years ago, in Chicago, Illinois
- Founder: Gary Comer
- Headquarters: Dodgeville, Wisconsin
- Number of locations: 26 (2024)
- Key people: Charlie Cole (CEO)
- Products: Clothing, luggage, home furnishings
- Revenue: ▼US$1.472 billion (FY2023)
- Operating income: ▼ −US$77 million (FY2023)
- Net income: ▼ −US$130 million (FY2023)
- Total assets: ▼US$811 million (February 2, 2024)
- Total equity: ▼US$241 million (February 2, 2024)
- Number of employees: 4,900 (2024)
- Website: landsend.com

Lands' End, Inc. is an American retailer of clothing, baggage, and furniture which began as a mail-order yachting supply company in 1963 in Chicago. The company is named after Land's End, a headland and tourist and holiday complex in western Cornwall, England; after promotional materials were printed, the founder noticed the typographical error in the location of the apostrophe, but could not afford to reprint the material. The company operates 26 domestic stores as of February 2024. Lands' End is headquartered in Dodgeville, Wisconsin.

== History ==
Lands' End began as a mail-order yachting supply company in 1963 in Chicago. It was founded by Gary Comer, along with his partners, 1963 Pan American Games gold medalist sailors Richard Stearns and Robert Halperin, and two of Stearns' employees.

In 1978, it expanded into general clothing and home furnishings, and moved to Dodgeville, Wisconsin.

In October 1986, it became a public company via an initial public offering.

In the late 1980s, Lands' End was the jersey supplier of the United States national rugby union team.

In July 1995, the company launched its website, Landsend.com.

In 2002, Sears, Roebuck and Company acquired the company for $2 billion in cash. Sears offered products by Lands' End in many of its retail stores, until 2019.

In November 2009, Lands' End launched Lands' End Canvas, which offered a more fashion-oriented selection of casual clothing for men and women. It was discontinued in 2013. The line was reintroduced in 2016 but cancelled in 2017 by the new CEO.

In 2013, the company partnered with Borderfree to display international orders in local currency.

The company began selling on Debenhams and in 2014, in its first international partnership, in House of Fraser.

In April 2014, Sears completed the corporate spin-off of the company, which once again became publicly traded.

Jerome Griffith became CEO in March 2017, succeeding Federica Marchionni.

In 2018, the company began selling on Amazon.com.

In 2018 and 2019, the company produced uniforms for employees of Delta Air Lines and American Airlines.

In 2019, Lands' End closed its remaining store-within-a-store branches in Sears stores, after Sears Holdings filed for Chapter 11 bankruptcy.

In 2020, the company entered into a partnership with Kohl's to sell the company's products in its stores.

In 2021, the company partnered with QVC to sell its products on its website, expanded to video sales in April 2022.

In fiscal 2023, 63.2% of its revenue was from online retail orders in the U.S., 7.7% of revenue was international orders, 18.3% of revenue was sales of logo apparel to businesses and schools, 7.6% of revenue was received from third-party sellers, and 3.2% of revenue was from company-operated stores.

In January 2026, Lands End agreed to form a joint venture with WHP Global. Lands End gets $300 million in cash and will contribute all of its intellectual property in exchange for royalty payments. Upon closing, the joint venture will be owned evenly between the two companies. In July 2026, Lands’ End appointed Charlie Cole as chief executive officer. Prior to becoming CEO, Cole was interim chief digital officer at direct-to-consumer bedding brand Thuma.

== Awards and recognition ==
In 1998, Lands' End was named among The 100 Best Companies to Work for in America by Fortune magazine.

== Controversies ==
In 2016, feminist activist Gloria Steinem was featured in the catalog of Lands' End. After an outcry from anti-abortion customers, the company removed Steinem from its website. The company then faced further criticism, this time both from customers who were still unhappy that Steinem had been featured in the first place, and customers who were unhappy that Steinem had been removed.
