= Robert Halperin =

American sailor

Robert Sherman Halperin
- Halperin in his youth

Personal information
- Born: January 26, 1908 Chicago, Illinois, U.S.
- Died: May 8, 1985 (aged 77) Palm Springs, California, U.S.
- Resting place: Arlington National
- Education: Notre Dame, Wisconsin
- Occupations: CEO, Commercial Light, 1959-60; Co-found Lands' End; NFL football player; US Navy Commander WWII Navy Cross, Silver, Bronze Stars
- Spouse: Margaret
- Children: 3 sons
Medal record
Men's sailing
Representing United States
Olympic Games
Bronze medal – third place	1960 Rome	Star
Pan American Games
Gold medal – first place	1963 Sao Paulo	Star

Robert Sherman "Bob" Halperin (January 26, 1908 – May 8, 1985), nicknamed "Buck", was an American business executive, decorated WWII naval officer and Star class yacht racer, who became an Olympic bronze medalist and Pan American Games gold medalist in the sport in the 1960s. He is best known professionally as co-founder of Lands' End, and chairman of Chicago's Commercial Light Company, founded by his father. He had formerly been a college and National Football League (NFL) football quarterback for the Brooklyn Dodgers. As a Naval officer and beach reconnaissance scout who observed, maintained, and guided critical beach landings throughout WWII, he became one of Chicago's most-decorated veterans.

== Early and personal life ==
Halperin was born in Chicago, Illinois, and was Jewish. His father, Aaron, immigrated to the United States from Kiev in the 1890s, and died in 1964, having founded Commercial Light Co., a Chicago electrical contractor in 1915. His mother, Julia, died in 1976.

Robert and his wife Margaret Stralka raised three sons, Thomas, Patrick and Daniel, who was Robert's biological son. He lived in the Near North Side of Chicago, and Palm Springs, California.

== Football career ==
He began his athletic endeavors as player and Captain of Chicago's Oak Park High School football team.

In college, Halperin began playing football for Notre Dame, as a quarterback under legendary coach Knute Rockne, and then played for the University of Wisconsin, graduating in 1932.

After 1932 college graduation, he played professional football as a quarterback for the Brooklyn Dodgers in the National Football League, under coach Benny Friedman. He later coached football at St. Patrick High School.

== Navy career ==
Halperin was one of Chicago`s most decorated sailors in World War II.

=== As scout, guiding assault infantry ===
He joined the United States Navy on March 19, 1942, at the advanced age of 34 as a seaman, ultimately rising to the level of lieutenant commander and then commander. He trained first under Marine boxer Gene Tunney, and then in a top-secret program in 1942 at Naval Amphibious Base Little Creek in Little Creek, Virginia, along with fellow NFL football players Phil Bucklew and John Tripson and seven others who made up the first class of what became known as the Navy Scouts & Raiders, a predecessor of the Navy Seals. The three former NFL players were among 1,000 NFL players who served in the military for the U.S. during World War II. The job of the trainees was to locate designated landing beaches at night for amphibious landings, note any obstacles, and guide the attacking troops and their landing craft.

War correspondent William H. Stoneman wrote of Halperin, "His job is to mark beaches for the assault infantry, a daring, intricate job, calling for as much brain as courage, and barrels of both." He was in charge of 14 scout boats, the first to arrive in France in the Normandy landings. Halperin saw action in Sicily, Italy, Europe (including during D-Day), North Africa, and the Pacific.

== Decorations ==
He was decorated for gallantry with the Navy Cross, the Silver Star, and two Bronze Stars, as well as the Yun Hui Clouded Banner, the highest honor of the Nationalist Chinese government.

== North Africa ==
U.S. Navy Presidential Citation

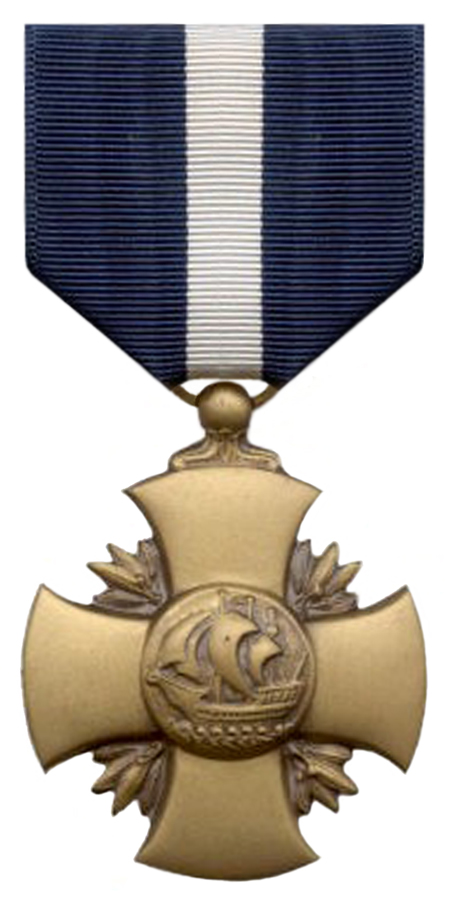
Navy Cross

In the invasion of North Africa in November 1942, he sailed his scout ship from seven miles off-shore in complete darkness to French Morocco, located and marked landing beaches with landing signals, guided assault troops to their targets while being strafed by enemy planes, and became the first American in the invasion to capture two of the enemy when he personally captured two officers. In recognition of his efforts, including his extraordinary heroism, skill, courage, and fearless devotion to duty under hazardous conditions, he received a presidential citation and the Navy Cross.

== Sicily ==
He was promoted to lieutenant commander for his actions in the assault on Scoglitti on the southeastern coast of Sicily in July–August 1943.

== Normandy ==
During the Normandy Invasion of the Cherbourg peninsula, in June 1944 he guided the first two waves of assault troops to the assault beaches, against entrenched strong opposition, and saved two men from drowning. The Chicago Tribune notes he was "one of the first Americans to go ashore in France—perhaps, the first—on D-Day." For his exceptionally meritorious performance of duty, and his "cool judgment and unusual ability", he was awarded a Bronze Star.

== China ==
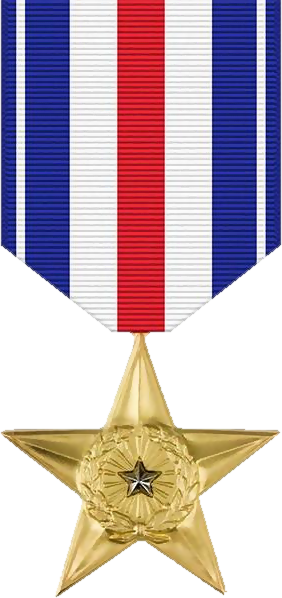
Silver Star

He was commanding officer of U.S. Naval Unit Six, from December 1944 to September 1945, in secret guerrilla action against the Japanese behind enemy lines in Fukien Province, China. During that time, his team of Americans trained 2,500 Chinese guerrillas to fight the Japanese, planned and executed operations resulting in the killing of 1,300 enemy troops, destroyed shipping, and assisted in the rescue of 16 U.S. fliers. While out-numbered and possessing inferior equipment, he attacked the enemy with ambushes and in pitched battles, significantly depleting their forces. For distinguishing himself "by gallantry and intrepidity", he was awarded a Silver Star by the American military. He was located in Chongqing, Kunming, Camp 6, Hua'an, Zhangzhou, Gulangyu, and Shanghai. He was granted a Gold Medal in lieu of a second Bronze Medal, for "distinguishing himself by exceptionally meritorious conduct.

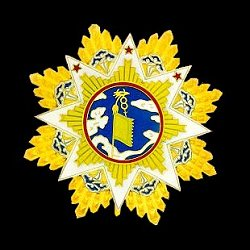
Order of the Cloud and Banner

In a rare form of recognition for American servicemen, the Nationalist Chinese government awarded him the Yun Hui "Order of the Cloud and Banner", its highest honor, often given to Admirals and Generals. The insignia features a fluttering yellow flag, surrounded by white clouds on a blue field, and radiating golden rays.

== Sailing career ==
Halperin, sailed for the Chicago Yacht Club and the Southern Lake Michigan Fleet. He won the North American Star Championship in 1959.

=== Olympic bronze medal ===
He won a bronze medal for the United States in the Star class (mixed two-person keelboat) at the 1960 Summer Olympics in the Bay of Naples in Italy, at the age of 52, together with William Parks. Their yacht was the Shrew II.

=== Pan-American gold medal ===
In 1963, he won a gold medal along with Richard Stearns at the Pan American Games in Sao Paulo, Brazil, sailing the Ninotchka.

== Honors ==
At the World Championships, the names of the crew whose yacht has the best total score are engraved on the Buck Halperin Trophy, named after him.

Halperin was inducted into the Chicagoland Sports Hall of Fame in 1989.

== Business career ==
=== Commercial Light ===
With a background in electrical engineering, Halperin became an executive and rose to become Chairman of Commercial Light Company, a large Chicago electrical contractor and engineering business which his father had founded in 1915. He became the company's President in 1959, and chairman in the 1960s. The company was involved in projects at key Chicago landmarks, including the John Hancock Center, O'Hare International Airport, and Wrigley Field.

=== Lands' End ===
He helped start the company Lands' End in the Spring of 1963, with fellow sailor and Pan-American gold medal pardner Richard Stearns, Halperin's close friend Gary Comer, and two of Stearns' employees.

== Death ==
Halperin died May 8, 1985, at Eisenhower Hospital, in Palm Springs, California, at the age of 77. His body is at rest at Arlington National Cemetery with that of his wife.

== See also ==
- List of Jews in sailing
