= Jorge de Cárdenas =

Cuban sailor (1933–1989)

Jorge de Cárdenas Plá (2 November 1933 – 15 February 1989) was a Cuban Olympic sailor.

== Biography ==
De Cárdenas was born in Havana, Cuba on 2 November 1933. He competed in three Olympic Games in the Finn and Star classes, in 1952 he finished 24th in the Finn class, in 1956 he finished 6th in the Star class crewing for his father Carlos de Cárdenas Culmell and in 1960 he finished 13th in the Star class together with his brother Carlos de Cárdenas Plá. He won a silver medal at the 1955 Star World Championships and a bronze medal at the 1956 edition.

De Cárdenas died in Miami, Florida on 15 February 1989, at the age of 55.
