= Hilary Smart =

American sailor

- Hilary Smart (right) with father Paul after winning the sailing event at the 1948 Olympics

Personal information
- Born: Hilary Hurlburt Smart; July 29, 1925 New York City, New York, U.S.
- Died: 8 January 2000 (aged 74) Weston, Massachusetts, U.S.
Medal record
Sailing
Representing the United States
Olympic Games
Gold medal – first place	1948 London	Star

Hilary Hurlburt Smart (July 29, 1925 – January 8, 2000) was an American sailor and Olympic champion. He competed at the 1948 Summer Olympics in London, where he received a gold medal in the star class with the boat Hilarius, together with his father, Paul Smart. He often described his Olympic victory by speaking about "the unbelievable feeling of watching the torch come in at the Olympic Stadium. It made me feel proud and responsible to think that my dad and I were the only Americans in our specialty since each country was allowed just a single two-man boat."

Smart was a graduate of The Choate School and a 1947 graduate of Harvard College. While a student at Harvard he was a member of the Varsity Club, the Delphic Club, the Crimson Key Society (a founder), and the Hasty Pudding Club. After he competed at the Olympics, Smart continued sailing in star class for almost fifty years, qualifying twice for the world championships. He then became vice president of national sales at Libbey-Owens-Ford and became the president of Airwick Professional Products. He died at his home in Weston, Massachusetts, in 2000 of natural causes at the age of 74.

== Early life ==
Hilary Hurlburt Smart was born July 29, 1925. His father was Paul Smart. Although Hilary was born in New York City, he was raised in Darien, Connecticut. In 1943, he joined the Aviation Cadet Training Program, where he was a specialist in navigation. Smart served there until 1945. Smart attended Choate School. He won an intercollegiate star class championship in 1946, while an undergraduate at Harvard University. While attending the university, Smart co-founded the Crimson Key Society, and graduated in 1947.

== 1948 Summer Olympics ==
Smart was a competitor at the 1948 Summer Olympics. He competed in the sailing event, with his partner being his father Paul. Seven races were competed at the event. In the first race, the Smarts finished in fourth place, managing a time of 1:58.52. The two finished the second race with a time of 1:52.12, moving them to first place; however, the third race saw them fall down to second place after Joaquim Fiúza and Júlio Gourinho finished slightly faster. In the fourth race, the Smarts claimed the first place; however, they finished third in the fifth race and were disqualified from the sixth. The seventh race saw the Smarts finish sixth. The Smarts won the most points based on their performance in each race. They received the gold medal.

In May 1992, Smart said the following to the Boston Globe about his victory:

We had to compete in seven races in 10 days, and the pressure was intense. We won two races and had two seconds. Going into the last race, we had to finish at least ninth to clinch the gold – and we finished sixth. It was kind of like playing a golf tournament knowing you can win by getting par instead of shooting for birdies. It was, in a way, a difficult position to be in because, if we were too careful, there's a chance it can slip away.

— Hilary Smart,

== Life post-Olympics ==
Smart continued sailing for almost 50 years after his Olympic victory, continuing to compete in the star class. He qualified twice for the World Championships – in 1981 and in 1985. He began living in Weston, Massachusetts, and taught Sunday school and acted in his church's drama group. Smart became vice president of national merchandising at Libbey-Owens Ford Sales Co. After that job, he became the president of Airwick Professional Products.

Smart married Nancy Childs, and had four children: Sally, Linda, Christine, and Hilary Samuel. By 1999, Smart had been relegated to a wheelchair and had to use an oxygen bottle. He died on January 8, 2000, in his Weston home of natural causes, and was survived by his children and nine great-grandchildren.
