= Harry Gale Nye Jr. =

American entrepreneur (1908–1987)

- Harry Nye (bottom right) and crew after winning the Port Huron to Mackinac Boat Race in 1948

Personal information
- Full name: Harry Gale Nye
- Nationality: United States
- Born: February 12, 1908 Chicago, Illinois
- Died: September 11, 1987 (aged 79) Newport Beach, California

Sailing career
- Sport: Sailing
- Class: Star
Medal record
Sailing
Representing United States
World Championships
Gold medal – first place	1942 Lake Michigan	Star class
Gold medal – first place	1949 Chicago	Star class
Silver medal – second place	1938 San Diego	Star class
Silver medal – second place	1941 Los Angeles	Star class

Harry Gale Nye Jr. (February 12, 1908 – September 11, 1987) was a Chicago-born American industrialist, entrepreneur, and world champion sailor. He graduated from the Berkshire School and joined the class of 1933 at Yale University where he was a member of the Society of Book and Snake. Nye, a descendant of the Yale family whose gift founded the university, left Yale prior to his graduation upon his father's death in order to return home to Chicago to become president of the Nye Tool and Machine Works. The Nye Tool had been the plaintiff in a patent infringement case heard by the United States Supreme Court in 1923.

In 1933, Mr. Nye together with Jim Murphy founded Murphy & Nye Sailmakers, a business which is today a prominent Italian fashion apparel company and frequent sponsor of and supplier to Louis Vuitton Cup and America's Cup campaigns such as United Internet Team Germany and Emirates Team New Zealand.

Nye was widely regarded as one of the nation's most respected yachtsmen. Nye's yachts aptly donned the family name, Gale. He twice won the Chicago Yacht Club Race to Mackinac in 1950 and 1951 and twice won the Star World Championship in the Star class in 1942 and 1949.

Nye won many other international sailing competitions including the Bacardi Cup (in 1938, 1940 and 1941), a regatta which was started by the Bacardi (rum) family and held in Havana, Cuba in the pre-Fidel Castro era.

In 1946, Nye served with New York Yacht Club Commodores Harold Stirling Vanderbilt and W.A.W. Stewart on a subcommittee of the North American Yacht Racing Union (now known as US Sailing) to write the revised International Yacht Racing Rules, originally codified by Vanderbilt in 1934.

Nye's commitment to the Star Class continued beyond his own active sailing career. He served as Commodore of the International Star Class Yacht Racing Association from 1955 to 1963. Following his death, the Harry Nye Trophy was established and is awarded to individuals whose extraordinary efforts contributed significantly to the success of the Star Class. The winner of the fourth race in the Star World Championship is also awarded the Harry G. Nye Trophy, in honor of Nye's dedication and service to the Star Class.

Nye founded and was president of North American Hydrofoils which designed and built the U.S.'s first commuter hydrofoils, named Enterprise and Endeavour, in 1961. These two prototype vessels were commissioned to shuttle commuters from Atlantic Highlands, New Jersey to Wall Street in Manhattan.

The Nye family is one of America's oldest. The Benjamin Nye Homestead stands as a museum in East Sandwich, Massachusetts. Harry Nye was descended from Mayflower passenger Thomas Rogers.

Harry Nye's oldest child, Julia Gale (Judy) Nye, was married to media mogul Ted Turner.

Harry Gale Nye Jr. died at Newport Beach, California on September 11, 1987, at the age of 79.

Nye has been nominated posthumously for induction into the National Sailing Hall of Fame.

== See also ==
- List of World Championships medalists in sailing (keelboat classes)
