= Richard Stearns (sailor) =

American sailor

Personal information
- Full name: Richard Irving Stearns III
- Nationality: American
- Born: September 4, 1927 Evanston, Illinois, U.S.
- Died: January 25, 2022 (aged 94) Delavan, Wisconsin, U.S.

Sailing career
- Sport: Sailing
- Club: Shore & Chicago Yacht Clubs
- Class: Star
Medal record
Sailing
Representing United States
Olympic Games
Silver medal – second place	1964 Tokyo	Star
Pan Am Games
Gold medal – first place	1963 Sao Paulo	Star
World Championships
Gold medal – first place	1962 Cascais	Star
North American Championships
Silver medal – second place	1969 Milwaukee	Soling

Richard Irving "Dick" Stearns, III (September 4, 1927 – January 25, 2022) was an American competitive sailor and Olympic and Pan American Games medalist.

== Biography ==
Stearns was born in Evanston, Illinois. In 1963, he won a gold medal along with Robert Halperin at the Pan American Games in Sao Paulo, Brazil, sailing Ninotchka. He also started the company Lands' End, in the Spring of 1963, with Halperin, Halperin's close friend Gary Comer, and two of Stearns' employees. He won a silver medal in the Star class at the 1964 Summer Olympics in Tokyo, together with Lynn Williams.
