= US Sailing =

National governing body for sailing in the USA

- Founded: October 30, 1897
- Location(s): 1 Roger Williams University Way, Bristol, Rhode Island, U.S. (On the campus of Roger Williams University)
- Website: ussailing.org

The United States Sailing Association (US Sailing) is the national governing body for sailing in the United States. Founded in 1897 and headquartered in Bristol, Rhode Island, US Sailing is a 501(c) (3) non-profit organization. US Sailing offers training and education programs for instructors and race officials, supports a wide range of sailing organizations and communities, issues offshore rating certificates, and provides administration and oversight of competitive sailing across the country, including National Championships and the US Sailing Team.

US Sailing is responsible for selection and training of the US Sailing Team representing the United States in the Olympic Games. Sailors who eventually compete in the Olympics are coming from a well developed racing community in the U.S. Sailboat racing can be found in colleges and universities, yacht clubs, sailing clubs and sailing schools. This support produces sailors with solid sailing experience to compete in the Olympics. U.S. sailors also compete in the America's Cup and other races around the world. Paul Cayard, who previously (2021–2023) served as the executive director of the US Olympic Sailing Team is an example of someone who sailed (unsuccessfully) both in the Olympics and the America's Cup.

US Sailing is an organization that is not only a governing body for the Olympics, but has a formal process to engage professional schools in establishing national standards for education and accreditation. It is making an effort to engage its 44,000+ sailing and boating members and has recognized publicly that there is more effort needed in outreach for inclusion and diversity. Its Siebel Sailors Program and other partnerships at the local level are seeking to improve the representation in the sport and recreational community so that it reflects the diversity in the US population.

== Objectives ==
The stated objectives of US Sailing are to:

- Provide leadership, integrity and advancement for the sport of sailing.
- Be the recognized leader in training and certification, in support for the racing sailor and in facilitating access to sailing.
- Promote the participation, education, opportunity and safety of sailing.
- Raise standards and expand competitive sailing in the U.S.
- Achieve success at highest levels of international competition.
- Strengthen governance and organizational efficiency.

== History ==
October 30, 1897: The North American Yacht Racing Union (NAYRU) was organized.

The Sears Cup has been awarded by US Sailing annually for the Chubb U.S. Junior Triplehanded Sailing Championship since 1921. The Mrs. Charles Francis Adams Trophy has been awarded annually by US Sailing for the U.S. Women's Sailing Championship since 1924. Neither US Sailing events were sailed during the World War II years 1942–45.

1931: Canada, which was originally part of NAYRU, formed its own Canadian Yachting Association (CYA)

1957: A trophy donated by the National Marine Manufacturers Association, was named for naval architect Nathanael Greene Herreshoff, began to be awarded annually

January 1975: NAYRU changed its name to the United States Yacht Racing Union. (USYRU)

Early 1980s: USYRU created a program to train young sailors through a network of certified instructors.

October 1991: USYRU change its name to the United States Sailing Association, Inc. and began to do business as US SAILING.

1993: US Sailing developed a comprehensive instruction program for adults to learn to sail in larger sailboats.

2019: US Sailing located its training for the US Sailing Olympic Team on Treasure Island, San Francisco

Competition at the 2020 Summer Olympics in Tokyo took place from 27 July to 6 August 2021 at the Enoshima Yacht Harbor. The RS:X, Laser, Laser Radial, Finn, 470, 49er, 49er FX, and Nacra 17 were all returning for 2020; there were no significant changes to the Olympic program from 2016.

== Membership ==
US Sailing has four levels of membership (Individual, Family, Youth, and College) with varying eligibility requirements and benefits.
