= RS:X World Championships =

Series of sailing championships

The RS:X was the windsurfing equipment used in the Olympics from 2008 to 2020. The class during this period had two annual World Championships international sailing regatta the RS:X World Championships and the RS:X Youth World Championships, these were organized by the host club on behalf of the International RS:X Class Association and recognized by World Sailing, the sports IOC recognized governing body. In addition the RS:X was used for Youth Sailing World Championships which is run entirely by World Sailing this unlike the class youth world championship is limited to one competitor per country.

== Events ==
Event			Host			Fleet	Sailors			Ref.
Ed.	Date	Year	Host club	City	Country	Fleet	No	Nat.	Cont.	Ref.
1	23-30 Sep	2006	Circolo Surf Torbole	Nago–Torbole	Italy	Male	164	38	5	
1	23-30 Sep	2006	Circolo Surf Torbole	Nago–Torbole	Italy	Female	80	28	5	
2	28Jun -13Jul	2007	Clube Naval de Cascais	Cascais	Portugal	Male	113	49	5	
2	28Jun -13Jul	2007	Clube Naval de Cascais	Cascais	Portugal	Female	73	29	5	
3	10-20 Jan	2008	Takapuna Boating Club	Takapuna	New Zealand	Male				
3	10-20 Jan	2008	Takapuna Boating Club	Takapuna	New Zealand	Female	76	33	5	
4	30Aug -11Sep	2009	Weymouth and Portland National Sailing Academy	Isle of Portland	United Kingdom	Male				
4	30Aug -11Sep	2009	Weymouth and Portland National Sailing Academy	Isle of Portland	United Kingdom	Female				
5	26Aug -5Sep	2010	Kerteminde Sejlklub	Kerteminde	Denmark	Male	112	42	5	
5	26Aug -5Sep	2010	Kerteminde Sejlklub	Kerteminde	Denmark	Female	66	26	5	
6	3-18 Dec	2011	Challenger Harbour	Fremantle	Australia	Male	91	45	5	
6	3-18 Dec	2011	Challenger Harbour	Fremantle	Australia	Female	68	33	5	
7	20-29 Mar	2012	-	Cádiz	Spain	Male				
7	20-29 Mar	2012	-	Cádiz	Spain	Female				
8	28Feb -7Mar	2013	Búzios Vela Clube	Armação dos Búzios	Brazil	Male	64	26	5	
8	28Feb -7Mar	2013	Búzios Vela Clube	Armação dos Búzios	Brazil	Female	41	18	5	
9	12-21 Sep	2014	Real Club Maritimo de Santander	Santander	Spain	Male	98	43	6	
9	12-21 Sep	2014	Real Club Maritimo de Santander	Santander	Spain	Female	62	30	5	
10	17-24 Oct	2015	Al Mussanah Sports City		OMA	Male	82	37	5	
10	17-24 Oct	2015	Al Mussanah Sports City		OMA	Female	59	30	5	
11	20-27 Feb	2016	-	Eilat	Israel	Male	81	30	4	
11	20-27 Feb	2016	-	Eilat	Israel	Female	58	22	4	
12	16-23 Sep	2017	-	Enoshima	Japan	Male	102	31	6	
12	16-23 Sep	2017	-	Enoshima	Japan	Female	66	25	4	
13	30Jul -12Aug	2018	Sailing Aarhus	Aarhus	Denmark	Male	85	32	5	
13	30Jul -12Aug	2018	Sailing Aarhus	Aarhus	Denmark	Female	62	28	5	
14	22-28 Sep	2019	Circolo Surf Torbole	Nago–Torbole	Italy	Male	130	37	5	
14	22-28 Sep	2019	Circolo Surf Torbole	Nago–Torbole	Italy	Female	106	36	5	
15	23-29 Feb	2020	Sorrento Sailing Couta Boat Club	Sorrento	Australia	Male	70	23	5	
15	23-29 Feb	2020	Sorrento Sailing Couta Boat Club	Sorrento	Australia	Female	46	24	5	
16	21-27 Apr	2021	Federación Andaluza de Vela	Cádiz	Spain	Male	42	21	5	
16	21-27 Apr	2021	Federación Andaluza de Vela	Cádiz	Spain	Female	28	18	3	

== Medalists Male ==
Year	Gold	Silver	Bronze	Ref.
2006	Casper Bouman (NED)	Tom Ashley (AUS)	Przemysław Miarczyński (POL)	
2007	Ricardo Santos (BRA)	Przemysław Miarczyński (POL)	Nick Dempsey (GBR)	
2008	Tom Ashley (NZL)	João Rodrigues (POR)	Shahar Tzuberi (ISR)	
2009	Nick Dempsey (GBR)	Nimrod Mashiah (ISR)	Dorian van Rijsselberge (NED)	
2010	Piotr Myszka (POL)	Przemysław Miarczyński (POL)	Nimrod Mashiah (ISR)	
2011	Dorian van Rijsselberghe (NED)	Piotr Myszka (POL)	Nimrod Mashiah (ISR)	
2012	Julien Bontemps (FRA)	Nick Dempsey (GBR)	Jon-Paul Tobin (NZL)	
2013	Nick Dempsey (GBR)	Dorian van Rijsselberghe (NED)	Byron Kokkalanis (GRE)	
2014	Julien Bontemps (FRA)	Przemysław Miarczyński (POL)	Thomas Goyard (FRA)	
2015	Pierre Le Coq (FRA)	Wang Aichen (CHN)	Dorian van Rijsselberghe (NED)	
2016	Piotr Myszka (POL)	Dorian van Rijsselberghe (NED)	Kiran Badloe (NED)	
2017	Bing Ye (CHN)	Mateo Sanz Lanz (SUI)	Mengfan Gao (CHN)	
2018	Dorian van Rijsselberghe (NED)	Kiran Badloe (NED)	Louis Giard (FRA)	
2019	Kiran Badloe (NED)	Dorian van Rijsselberghe (NED)	Pierre Le Coq (FRA)	
2020	Kiran Badloe (NED)	Dorian van Rijsselberghe (NED)	Thomas Goyard (FRA)	
2021	Kiran Badloe (NED)	Mattia Camboni (ITA)	Byron Kokkalanis (GRE)	

== Medalists Female ==
year	Gold	Silver	Bronze	Ref.
2006	Alessandra Sensini (ITA)	Marina Alabau (ESP)	Faustine Merret (FRA)	
2007	Zofia Klepacka (POL)	Barbara Kendall (NZL)	Jessica Crisp (AUS)	
2008	Alessandra Sensini (ITA)	Barbara Kendall (NZL)	Marina Alabau (ESP)	
2009	Marina Alabau (ESP)	Blanca Manchón (ESP)	Charline Picon (FRA)	
2010	Blanca Manchón (ESP)	Alessandra Sensini (ITA)	Charline Picon (FRA)	
2011	Lee Korzits (ISR)	Zofia Klepacka (POL)	Marina Alabau (ESP)	
2012	Lee Korzits (ISR)	Zofia Klepacka (POL)	Alessandra Sensini (ITA)	
2013	Lee Korzits (ISR)	Bryony Shaw (GBR)	Maayan Davidovich (ISR)	
2014	Charline Picon (FRA)	Marina Alabau (ESP)	Maayan Davidovich (ISR)	
2015	Chen Peina (CHN)	Bryony Shaw (GBR)	Lilian de Geus (NED)	
2016	Małgorzata Białecka (POL)	Bryony Shaw (GBR)	Lilian de Geus (NED)	
2017	Chen Peina (CHN)	Jiahui Wu (CHN)	Lu Yunxiu (CHN)	
2018	Lilian de Geus (NED)	Charline Picon (FRA)	Lu Yunxiu (CHN)	
2019	Lu Yunxiu (CHN)	Katy Spychakov (ISR)	Lilian de Geus (NED)	
2020	Lilian de Geus (NED)	Charline Picon (FRA)	Noy Drihan (ISR)	
2021	Lilian de Geus (NED)	Katy Spychakov (ISR)	Charline Picon (FRA)	

== See also ==
- World Championships in Sailing
- Youth Sailing World Championships
- Sailing World Championships
- Sailing at the Summer Olympics
- RS:X Youth World Championships
