= 2014 ISAF Sailing World Championships – Women's RS:X =

Women's RS:X at the 2014 ISAF Sailing World Championships
- Venue: Santander, Spain
- Dates: 13–19 September
- Competitors: 62 from 30 nations

Medalists
gold medal	Charline Picon	France
silver medal	Marina Alabau	Spain
bronze medal	Maayan Davidovich	Israel

The women's RS:X class at the 2014 ISAF Sailing World Championships was held in Santander, Spain 13–19 September.

== Results ==
Results of individual races
Pos	Helmsman	Country	I	II	III	IV	V	VI	VII	VIII	IX	X	XI	MR	Tot	Pts
Gold medal	Charline Picon	France	1	1	4	2	2	3	3	3	3	3	9^{†}	2	36	27
Silver medal	Marina Alabau	Spain	5	16^{†}	13	6	6	2	10	8	2	1	2	12	83	67
Bronze medal	Maayan Davidovich	Israel	4	10	6	8	16^{†}	5	4	2	1	8	5	14	83	67
4	Wu Jiahui	China	3	15	16^{†}	1	7	6	11	5	11	5	3	4	87	71
5	Bryony Shaw	Great Britain	5	11	1	5	2	9	23^{†}	10	6	9	7	10	98	75
6	Flavia Tartaglini	Italy	2	17^{†}	14	9	11	16	1	4	8	2	4	DPI 9	97	80
7	Zofia Noceti-Klepacka	Poland	16^{†}	3	3	10	9	1	8	1	12	16	16	6	101	85
8	Eugénie Ricard	France	9	1	5	6	8	4	6	11	7	13^{†}	12	20	102	89
9	Isobel Hamilton	Great Britain	6	2	7	16^{†}	8	13	7	9	4	12	6	16	106	90
10	Lilian de Geus	Netherlands	2	10	5	10	5	10	5	13^{†}	9	6	10	18	103	90
11	Blanca Manchón	Spain	11	12	8	15	9	7	9	6	20^{†}	4	1	–	102	82
12	Zheng Manjia	China	16	22^{†}	6	8	DPI 7	8	12	7	16	10	8	–	120	98
13	Hanna Zembrzuska	Poland	4	15	16^{†}	13	13	12	2	12	13	7	13	–	120	104
14	Patrícia Freitas	Brazil	9	2	9	2	3	15	15	18	25^{†}	20	19	–	137	112
15	Tuuli Petäjä-Sirén	Finland	7	6	15	7	DSQ 32^{†}	11	13	17	18	11	11	–	148	116
16	Kamila Smektała	Poland	8	8	12	5	4	14	19^{†}	15	15	18	17	–	135	116
17	Małgorzata Białecka	Poland	6	5	3	4	7	20	17	25^{†}	14	19	22	–	142	117
18	Laura Linares	Italy	7	7	8	OCS 32^{†}	6	19	14	16	17	14	14	–	154	122
19	Stefaniya Elfutina	Russia	21	12	2	4	12	23^{†}	16	14	10	17	15	–	146	123
20	Lu Yunxiu	China	3	28^{†}	14	1	17	26	21	28	5	15	18	–	176	148
21	Natalia Kosinska	New Zealand	10	5	18	DSQ 32^{†}	3	17	DNF 32	19	19	24	20	–	199	167
22	Weng Qiaoshan	China	13	14	1	DSQ 32^{†}	5	18	22	20	22	21	RET 32	–	200	168
23	Ingrid Puusta	Estonia	14	11	10	OCS 32^{†}	10	22	20	22	23	23	21	–	208	176
24	Demita Vega	Mexico	1	4	17	18	20	27	18	26	21	29^{†}	24	–	205	176
25	Hadar Heller	Israel	21	9	2	11	17	21	DNF 32^{†}	21	27	27	23	–	211	179
26	Bérénice Mege	France	13	18	18	3	14	24	DNF 32^{†}	24	26	25	26	–	223	191
27	Marta Maggetti	Italy	12	4	10	14	18	DNF 32^{†}	DNF 32	DNF 32	24	22	RET 32	–	232	200
28	Megumi Komine	Japan	23	8	12	7	4	DNF 32^{†}	DNF 32	DNF 32	30	DNF 32	27	–	239	207
29	Fujiko Onishi	Japan	29	20	11	3	15	25	DNF 32^{†}	23	DSQ 32	26	25	–	241	209
30	Lærke Buhl-Hansen	Denmark	19	6	20	9	15	28	DNF 32^{†}	27	28	30	28	–	242	210
31	Bruna Martinelli	Brazil	20	7	9	23	10	DNF 32^{†}	DNF 32	DNF 32	29	28	29	–	251	219
32	Maja Dziarnowska	Poland	8	13	21^{†}	18	18	1	1	2	1	–	–	–	83	62
33	Sun Jiali	China	15	24	4	DSQ 32^{†}	DPI 7	2	5	5	17	–	–	–	111	79
34	Hélène Noesmoen	France	15	25^{†}	23	12	11	4	12	1	2	–	–	–	105	80
35	Yuki Sunaga	Japan	17	20	19	21^{†}	16	3	4	9	6	–	–	–	115	94
36	Joanna Sterling	Australia	12	18	23^{†}	17	23	7	11	8	3	–	–	–	122	99
37	Jeanne Dantes	France	11	26^{†}	19	21	26	5	8	6	4	–	–	–	126	100
38	Anastasiya Valkevich	Belarus	10	31^{†}	27	19	22	11	2	3	7	–	–	–	132	101
39	Maria Mollestad	Norway	25	19	26^{†}	11	21	8	6	7	5	–	–	–	128	102
40	Farrah Hall	United States	17	14	15	13	13	21^{†}	19	15	9	–	–	–	136	115
41	Megumi Iseda	Japan	18	9	17	12	14	17	20^{†}	18	13	–	–	–	138	118
42	Maëlle Guilbaud	France	19	26^{†}	22	24	24	9	7	10	8	–	–	–	149	123
43	Anzhela Poludarova	Russia	24	19	11	OCS 32^{†}	12	6	15	17	19	–	–	–	155	123
44	Marion Lepert	United States	14	30^{†}	30	25	27	13	3	4	11	–	–	–	157	127
45	Elena Vacca	Italy	24^{†}	21	13	17	23	12	16	23	10	–	–	–	159	135
46	Noelle Finch	Great Britain	20	23	25^{†}	14	20	19	10	13	16	–	–	–	160	135
47	Angeliki Skarlatou	Greece	18	23^{†}	20	20	22	10	18	14	15	–	–	–	160	137
48	Imogen Sills	Great Britain	26	27^{†}	22	16	27	18	9	12	21	–	–	–	178	151
49	Pepa Mavrodieva	Bulgaria	22	3	24^{†}	15	19	23	24	24	22	–	–	–	176	152
50	Pilar Lamadrid	Spain	23	13	21	27	28^{†}	22	13	22	14	–	–	–	183	155
51	Sára Cholnoky	Hungary	25^{†}	25	25	22	25	14	14	11	23	–	–	–	184	159
52	Emma Wilson	Great Britain	22	21	24^{†}	24	24	15	17	19	18	–	–	–	184	160
53	Fanny Baumann	Sweden	28^{†}	16	7	19	21	27	25	25	20	–	–	–	188	160
54	María Celia Tejerina	Argentina	29	29	27	30^{†}	29	16	23	16	12	–	–	–	211	181
55	Laurence Bonneau-Charland	Canada	27^{†}	27	26	20	25	26	21	21	24	–	–	–	217	190
56	Dilara Uralp	Turkey	30^{†}	24	28	23	29	24	22	20	RDG 22	–	–	–	222	192
57	Stefanie Schwarz	Germany	27	17	29^{†}	26	19	25	27	26	25	–	–	–	221	192
58	Solvig Sayre	United States	26	28	28	29^{†}	26	20	26	27	26	–	–	–	236	207
59	Dismary Bonillo	Venezuela	DNF 32^{†}	29	31	25	30	28	29	28	27	–	–	–	259	227
60	Blanca Carracedo	Spain	DNF 32^{†}	30	29	22	28	DNS 32	28	DNF 32	DNF 32	–	–	–	265	233
61	Saskia Sills	Great Britain	28	22	DNF 32^{†}	28	DNF 32	DNF 32	DNF 32	DNF 32	DNF 32	–	–	–	270	238
62	Katia Belabbas	Algeria	DNF 32^{†}	31	30	31	30	DNF 32	DNF 32	DNF 32	DNF 32	–	–	–	282	250

Scoring system: low-point system; Source:
Legend: – Qualified for medal race(s); DNS – Did not start; DSQ – Disqualified; OCS – On the course side of the starting line; RDG – Redress given; RET – Retired; † – Discarded race not counted in the overall result;
