= 2011 ISAF Sailing World Championships – Women's RS:X =

Women's RS:X at the 2011 ISAF Sailing World Championships
- Venue: Perth, Western Australia
- Dates: 5–11 December
- Competitors: 68 from 33 nations

Medalists
gold medal	Lee Korzits	Israel
silver medal	Zofia Noceti-Klepacka	Poland
bronze medal	Marina Alabau	Spain

The Women's RS:X class at the 2011 ISAF Sailing World Championships was held in Perth, Western Australia between 5 and 11 December 2011.

== Results ==
Results of individual races
Pos	Helmsman	Country	I	II	III	IV	V	VI	VII	VIII	IX	X	MR	Tot	Pts
Gold medal	Lee Korzits	Israel	1	4	2	1	1	9^{†}	2	3	4	3	10	40	31
Silver medal	Zofia Noceti Klepacka	Poland	10	18^{†}	4	3	2	1	1	6	1	1	4	51	33
Bronze medal	Marina Alabau	Spain	3	11^{†}	1	2	3	2	8	1	2	5	18	56	45
4	Huang Yue	China	7	2	6	4	4	25^{†}	7	5	9	10	6	85	60
5	Charline Picon	France	7	3	4	6	4	13	4	2	24^{†}	13	8	88	64
6	Maayan Davidovich	Israel	9	12	5	1	7	28^{†}	RDG 12	14	5	6	2	101	73
7	Bryony Shaw	Great Britain	2	3	1	3	2	20^{†}	6	12	18	11	16	94	74
8	Li Ling	China	4	6	9	6	5	3	23	24^{†}	7	9	12	108	84
9	Laura Linares	Italy	5	1	7	11	6	4	22^{†}	11	14	14	14	109	87
10	Olha Maslivets	Ukraine	9	9	3	5	7	10	21^{†}	17	3	4	20	108	87
11	Alessandra Sensini	Italy	12	16^{†}	3	2	14	14	5	7	11	7	–	91	75
12	Blanca Manchón	Spain	19	23^{†}	2	8	1	7	20	4	6	20	–	110	87
13	Flavia Tartaglini	Italy	2	8	16	4	5	12	13	8	19	22^{†}	–	109	87
14	Moana Delle	Germany	3	7	5	8	9	16	18	13	16	23^{†}	–	118	95
15	Nikola Girke	Canada	27^{†}	23	8	9	3	23	15	18	15	2	–	143	116
16	Tuuli Petäjä	Finland	14	17	9	13	11	15	11	19	20^{†}	8	–	137	117
17	Jessica Crisp	Australia	21	1	16	9	12	27^{†}	9	20	17	17	–	149	122
18	Maja Dziarnowska	Poland	22	25	8	7	8	32^{†}	3	22	8	19	–	154	122
19	Agata Brygoła	Poland	4	6	12	12	8	31^{†}	17	21	25	21	–	157	126
20	Chen Qiubin	China	15	13	18	5	13	18	10	10	28	DNF 35^{†}	–	165	130
21	Hayley Chan	Hong Kong	18	20	6	7	21	21	19	9	23^{†}	12	–	156	133
22	Chan Wai Kei	Hong Kong	16	19	11	13	11	19	26^{†}	16	13	15	–	159	133
23	Jannicke Stålstrøm	Norway	13	5	21	14	10	17	30	15	32^{†}	18	–	175	143
24	Pauline Perrin	France	20	12	19	11	13	6	16	32^{†}	29	30	–	188	156
25	Eugenie Richard	France	8	8	15	18	17	11	28	29^{†}	26	25	–	185	156
26	Steff Williams	New Zealand	26	21	7	10	6	34^{†}	27	23	21	16	–	191	157
27	Ning Wang	China	10	7	19	18	18	5	24	33^{†}	33	31	–	198	165
28	Irina Konstantinova-Bontemps	Bulgaria	17	9	14	16	17	8	31^{†}	31	27	29	–	199	168
29	Patrícia Freitas	Brazil	11	10	10	15	22	30^{†}	14	30	30	28	–	200	170
30	Sigrid Rondelez	Belgium	12	14	14	15	19	24	34^{†}	25	22	26	–	205	171
31	Izzy Hamilton	Great Britain	25	20	13	10	12	29	25	27	12	32^{†}	–	205	173
32	Allison Shreeve	Australia	15	25	11	19	15	33^{†}	32	26	10	24	–	210	177
33	Yuki Sunaga	Japan	22	16	10	17	16	26	29	28	31^{†}	27	–	222	191
34	Huali Zhu	China	5	4	24	24	27	22	33	34^{†}	34	33	–	240	206
35	Natalia Kosińska	New Zealand	6	24^{†}	22	23	RDG 18.8	1	2	9	2	1	–	108.8	84.8
36	Angeliki Skarlatou	Greece	19	DNF 35^{†}	15	24	9	16	1	1	3	3	–	126	91
37	Chen Peina	China	23	2	26^{†}	17	23	2	3	5	6	13	–	120	94
38	Hanna Zembrzuska	Poland	28^{†}	28	12	12	10	23	11	2	1	4	–	131	103
39	Diána Detre	Hungary	24	26^{†}	13	16	14	7	9	7	9	12	–	137	111
40	Lilian de Geus	Netherlands	24	26^{†}	17	19	15	3	14	4	4	17	–	143	117
41	Justina Sellers	New Zealand	16	22	20	26^{†}	24	4	17	3	7	5	–	144	118
42	Fujiko Onishi	Japan	8	5	29^{†}	28	28	6	8	16	16	15	–	159	130
43	Agnieszka Bilska	Poland	21	13	18	20	22	22	27^{†}	12	5	2	–	162	135
44	Claudia Carney	Great Britain	34^{†}	29	17	20	16	10	13	6	11	19	–	175	141
45	Yasuko Kosuge	Japan	6	24^{†}	21	21	20	11	12	22	20	11	–	168	144
46	Maria Aadland	Norway	23^{†}	19	22	22	21	19	4	14	17	7	–	168	145
47	Dominique Vallee	Canada	25^{†}	15	24	25	25	12	6	13	13	18	–	176	151
48	Napalai Tansai	Thailand	18	11	25	28^{†}	26	21	5	8	19	21	–	182	154
49	Pepa Mavrodieva	Bulgaria	1	18	23	26	28	14	10	11	29^{†}	25	–	185	156
50	Ingrid Puusta	Estonia	26^{†}	14	20	23	25	15	23	10	15	14	–	185	159
51	Farrah Hall	United States	11	31^{†}	27	25	24	13	7	24	18	16	–	196	165
52	Lærke Buhl-Hansen	Denmark	14	10	29^{†}	29	29	8	16	19	24	23	–	201	172
53	Joanna Sterling	Australia	33^{†}	17	23	27	26	26	25	17	8	6	–	208	175
54	Demita Vega	Mexico	27	30	25	21	19	DPI 8	DPI 18	DPI 18	OCS 35	10	–	211	176
55	Sara Katalin Cholnoky	Hungary	31	30	26	14	18	33^{†}	19	21	12	8	–	212	179
56	Veronica Fanciulli	Italy	20	15	32^{†}	31	29	17	18	18	21	24	–	225	193
57	Jazmín López Becker	Argentina	32	34^{†}	28	22	27	29	21	26	10	9	–	238	204
58	Carmen Rego Monteiro	Brazil	31	32^{†}	28	27	23	18	24	23	22	20	–	248	216
59	Siripon Kaewuang-Ngam	Thailand	17	22	31	30	DNF 35^{†}	9	26	30	30	30	–	260	225
60	Bruna Martinelli	Brazil	29	27	30	31^{†}	30	24	20	25	25	27	–	268	237
61	Audrey Yong	Singapore	13	21	33^{†}	33	33	20	30	28	28	32	–	271	238
62	Eirini Nikola Makedona	Cyprus	30	33^{†}	30	30	32	25	28	27	14	22	–	271	238
63	Carolina Mendelblatt	Portugal	28	27	31	32^{†}	30	27	22	20	27	26	–	270	238
64	Tatiana Bazyuk	Russia	29	28	27	29	31	28	DNF 35^{†}	DNF 35	23	28	–	293	258
65	Amanda Ling Kai Ng	Singapore	30	29	32	DNF 35^{†}	31	30	29	29	31	31	–	307	272
66	Annalise Gilbert	Australia	32	31	33	DNF 35^{†}	DNF 35	31	31	32	26	29	–	315	280
67	Monique Meijer	Netherlands Antilles	34	32	34	DNF 35^{†}	DNF 35	32	32	31	DNC 35	DNC 35	–	335	300
68	Kathleen Tocke	United States	33	OCS 35	DNC 35	DNC 35	DNC 35	34	DNF 35	DNF 35	DNC 35	DNC 35	–	347	312

Legend: – Qualified for medal race(s); DNC – Did not come to the starting area; DNF – Did not finish; DPI – Discretionary penalty imposed; OCS – On the course side of the starting line; RDG – Redress given; † – Discarded race not counted in the overall result;
