= RS:X European Championships =

The RS:X European Championships are international sailing regattas in the RS:X class.

== Editions ==
Year	City	Country	Dates	Events	Athletes	Nations	Notes
2006	Alaçatı	Turkey	11–16 June				
2007	Limassol	Cyprus	9–15 June				
2008	Brest	France	5–11 May				
2009	Tel Aviv	Israel	15–21 June				
2010	Sopot	Poland	1–10 July				
2011	Burgas	Bulgaria	12–18 September				
2012	Madeira	Portugal	24 February – 1 March				
2013	Brest	France	30 June – 7 July				
2014	Çeşme	Turkey	28 June – 5 July				
2015	Mondello	Italy	May				
2016	Helsinki	Finland	4–9 July				
2017	Marseille	France	8–13 May				
2018	Sopot	Poland	19–25 August				
2019	Palma	Spain	9–13 April				
2020	Vilamoura	Portugal	24–28 November				
2021	Vilamoura	Portugal	9–13 March				

== Medalists ==
=== Men ===
Year	Gold	Silver	Bronze
2006			
2007	Przemyslaw MIARCZYNSKI (POL)	Piotr MYSZKA (POL)	
2008			
2009			
2010			
2011			
2012			
2013			
2014			
2015			
2016	Thomas Goyard (FRA)	Kieran Holmes-Martin (GBR)	Paweł Tarnowski (POL)
2017	Louis Giard (FRA)	Byron Kokkalanis (GRE)	Mattia Camboni (ITA)
2018	Mattia Camboni (ITA)	Yoav Omer (ISR)	Shahar Tzuberi (ISR)
2019	Kiran Badloe (NED)	Dorian van Rijsselberghe (NED)	Thomas Goyard (FRA)
2020	Yoav Cohen (ISR)	Shahar Tzuberi (ISR)	Kiran Badloe (NED)
2021	Kiran Badloe (NED)	Mattia Camboni (ITA)	Ofek Elimelech (ISR)

=== Women ===
Year	Gold	Silver	Bronze
2006			
2007	Marina ALABAU (ESP)		
2008			
2009			
2010			
2011			
2012			
2013			
2014			
2015			
2016	Charline Picon (FRA)	Zofia Noceti-Klepacka (POL)	Stefania Elfutina (RUS)
2017	Zofia Noceti-Klepacka (POL)	Stefaniya Elfutina (RUS)	Flavia Tartaglini (ITA)
2018	Zofia Noceti-Klepacka (POL)	Stefaniya Elfutina (RUS)	Emma Wilson (GBR)
2019	Lilian de Geus (NED)	Emma Wilson (GBR)	Charline Picon (FRA)
2020	Charline Picon (FRA)	Katy Spychakov (ISR)	Zofia Noceti-Klepacka (POL)
2021	Charline Picon (FRA)	Lilian de Geus (NED)	Zofia Noceti-Klepacka (POL)
