= 2006 RS:X World Championships =

Official logo

The 2006 RS:X World Championships were held at the Lake Garda in Trentino, Italy between September 23 and September 30, 2006.

== Men's results ==
Pos.	Sailor	Points
	(Netherlands) Casper Bouman	23
	(New Zealand) Tom Ashley	23
	(Poland) Przemysław Miarczyński	24
4.	(Netherlands) Joeri van Dijk	48
5.	(United Kingdom) Nick Dempsey	51
6.	(Ukraine) Maxime Oberemko	76
7.	(Poland) Piotr Myszka	78
8.	(Germany) Toni Wilhelm	78
9.	(Brazil) Ricardo Santos	82
10.	(France) Nicolas Le Gal	93

^{^} Bouman finished in a higher position during the medal race

== Women's results ==
Pos.	Sailor	Points
	(Italy) Alessandra Sensini	28
	(Spain) Marina Alabau	32
	(France) Faustine Merret	56
4.	(Poland) Zofia Klepacka	64
5.	(New Zealand) Barbara Kendall	85
6.	(Germany) Romy Kinzl	102
7.	(Australia) Jessica Crisp	104
8.	(France) Charline Picon	106
9.	(Greece) Antonia Frai	112
10.	(United Kingdom) Bryony Shaw	120

== See also ==
- Windsurfing World Championships
