= Katy Spychakov =

Israeli windsurfer

Personal information
- Native name: קטי ספיצ'קוב
- National team: Israel
- Born: 6 August 1999 (age 27) Eilat, Israel
- Home town: Eilat, Israel

Sport
- Sport: Windsurfing
- Events: RS:X, IQFoil
- Club: Hapoel Eilat Sailing Club

Achievements and titles
- Olympic finals: 6th (2021)
- World finals: (silver) (2019, 2021, 2023)
- Regional finals: (silver) (2020)
Medal record
Sailing
Representing Israel
Techno 293 World Championships
Gold medal – first place	2015	U17 Techno 293
Silver medal – second place	2014	U17 Techno 293
Silver medal – second place	2013	U15 Techno 293
RS:X World Championships
Gold medal – first place	2015	RS:X U21
RS:X World Championships
Silver medal – second place	2019 Torbole	RS:X
Silver medal – second place	2021 Cádiz	RS:X
iQFoil World Championships
Silver medal – second place	2023 The Hague	iQFoil
Bronze medal – third place	2024 Lanzarote	iQFoil
RS:X European Championships
Silver medal – second place	2020 Vilamoura	RS:X
- Updated on 21 August 2023

Katy Spychakov (Hebrew: קטי ספיצ'קוב; born 6 August 1999) is an Israeli professional windsurfer. She has competed in the Olympics and won multiple world championships.

== Early life ==
Spychakov was born in Eilat, Israel, to immigrant parents from Ukraine. She has three siblings. She served as a soldier in the Israeli Navy at the Atlit naval base.

Spychakov began windsurfing when she was 10 years old, and racing when she was 13 years old. Spychakov is a member of the Hapoel Eilat Sailing Club. It was being selected to represent Israel at the 2016 ISAF Youth Sailing World Championships which is one athlete per country that started her professional career.

== Career ==
=== Olympics ===
In August 2019, Spychakov won a bronze medal in the RS:X Women's competition at Ready Steady Tokyo – Sailing on the island of Enoshima, Japan.

Spychakov competed in the 2020 Summer Olympics in the Women's RS:X event.

=== World Championship ===
Position	Year	Category	Event
2	2013	Female Under 15	Techno 293 World Championships
2	2014	Female Under 17	Techno 293 World Championships
1	2015	Female Under 17	Techno 293 World Championships
1	2016	Female	ISAF Youth Sailing World Championships
1	2016	Female	RS:X Youth World Championships
1	2019	Female	RS:X Youth World Championships.
23	2016	Female	2016 RS:X World Championships
33	2017	Female	2017 RS:X World Championships
13	2018	Female	2018 RS:X World Championships
2	2019	Female	2019 RS:X World Championships
6	2020	Female	2020 RS:X World Championships
2	2021	Female	2021 RS:X World Championships
6	2022	Female	iQFoil World Championships
2	2023	Female	iQFoil World Championships
3	2024	Female	iQFoil World Championships
21	2025	Female	iQFoil World Championships

=== Other ===
See RS:X European Championships
