= Mateo Sanz Lanz =

Swiss windsurfer

Personal information
- Nationality: Swiss
- Born: 6 November 1993 (age 32) Formentera del Segura, Spain
- Height: 172 cm (5 ft 8 in)
- Weight: 64 kg (141 lb)

Sailing career
- Sport: Sailing
- Class(es): RS:X, IQFOiL
Medal record
Men's sailing
Representing Switzerland
World Championships
Silver medal – second place	2017 Enoshima	Men's RS:X

Mateo Sanz Lanz (born 6 November 1993) is a Spanish-born Swiss windsurfer. He competed for Switzerland at the 2016 Summer Olympics, placing 14th in the men's RS:X event, and at the 2020 Summer Olympics, placing 8th in the men's RS:X event. Sanz Lanz placed 2nd in the men's event at the 2017 RS:X World Championships. He was born in Formentera del Segura and resides in San Francisco Javier, Formentera, Balearic Islands.
