= Przemysław Miarczyński =

Polish windsurfer

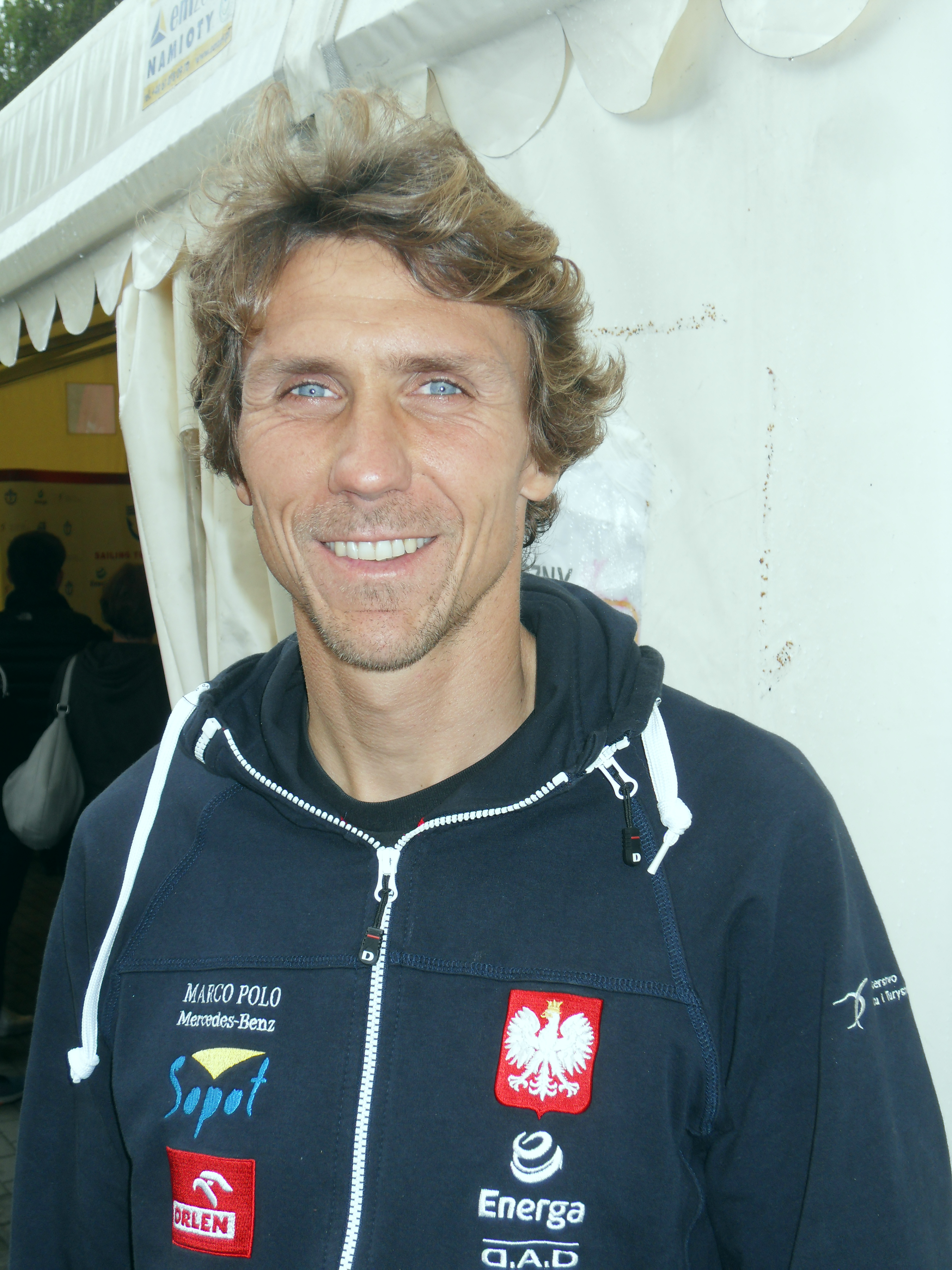
- Miarczyński in 2015

Personal information
- Nationality: Polish
- Born: 26 August 1979 (age 46) Gdańsk, Poland
- Height: 185 cm (6 ft 1 in)
- Weight: 78 kg (172 lb)

Sailing career
- Sport: Sailing
- Club: Sopocki Klub Żeglarski Hestia
- Class(es): RS:X, Mistral, Formula Windsurfing, IQFOiL, Raceboard
Medal record
Men's Windsurfing
Representing Poland
Olympic Games
Bronze medal – third place	2012 London	RS:X
World Championships
Silver medal – second place	2014 Santander	RS:X

Przemysław Miarczyński (born 26 August 1979) is a Polish windsurfer and Olympic athlete.

Miarczyński already competed at the top-level when he was a teenager, becoming a multiple medal winner in Junior and Youth World Championships. During the 2000 Summer Olympics in Sydney, he finished in eighth position in the mistral class. In 2001 he won a silver medal at the Junior and Senior World Championships. He became World Champion in 2003 and finished in fifth position during the 2004 Summer Olympics. In the Olympic season, he also became European Champion and a World Champion runner-up.

Miarczyński won the bronze medal at the 2006 RS:X World Championships. He finished only one point behind world champion Casper Bouman and Tom Ashley who had as much points as Bouman. The gap between Miarczyński and fourth placed Joeri van Dijk was 24 points.

At the 2012 Summer Olympics, he won the bronze medal in the RS:X class.

== Achievements ==
Year	Position	Boat type	Event
2012		RS:X - Men's Windsurfer	(United Kingdom) 2012 Olympic Games
2006		RS:X - Men's Windsurfer	(Italy) 2006 RS:X World Championships
2006		RS:X - Men's Windsurfer	(Poland) Gdynia Sailing Days
2006		RS:X - Men's Windsurfer	(Spain) Andalusian Olympic Week
2006		RS:X - Men's Windsurfer	(New Zealand) Sail Auckland International Regatta
2006		RS:X - Men's Windsurfer	New Zealand RS:X National Championship
2004		Mistral - Men	(Poland) 2004 Mistral European Championship
2004		Mistral - Men	(Turkey) 2004 Mistral World Championship
2004		Mistral - Men	(Greece) Athens Eurolymp Week
2004	5.	Mistral - Men	(Greece) 2004 Summer Olympics
2003		Mistral - Men	(Spain) 2003 Mistral World Championship
2002		Mistral - Men	(Poland) Gdynia Sailing Days
2002		Mistral - Men	(Germany) Kiel Week
2002		Mistral - Men	(Netherlands) Spa Regatta
2001		Mistral - Men	(Poland) Gdynia Sailing Days
2001		Mistral - Men	(Greece) 2001 Mistral World Championship
2001		Mistral - Men	(France) 2001 Mistral Junior World Championship
2000	8.	Mistral - Men	(Australia) 2000 Summer Olympics
1999		Mistral - Men	(Germany) Kiel Week
1999		Mistral - Men	(Portugal) XXV International Sailing Carnival Trophy
1998		Mistral - Men	(France) Semaine Olympique 98 Hyères
1996		Mistral - Men	(Spain) 1996 Mistral Youth World Championship
1996		Mistral - Men	(United States) 1996 IYRU O'Neill Youth Worlds
1996		Mistral - Men	(Germany) Kiel Week
