= Tom Reuveny =

Israeli windsurfer (born 2000)

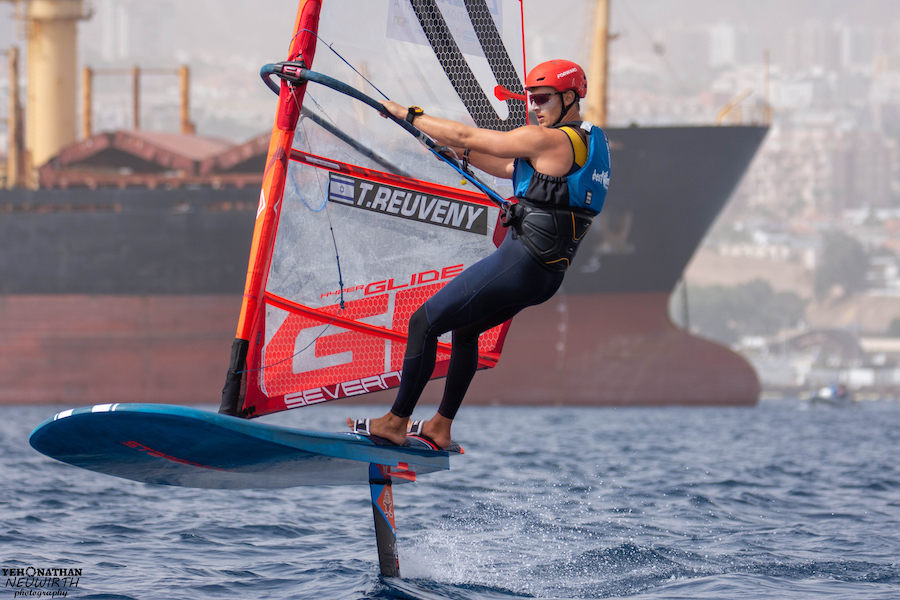
- Reuveny in 2022

Personal information
- Native name: תום ראובני
- Nationality: Israeli
- Born: 12 June 2000 (age 26) Ramat Gan, Israel

Sailing career
- Sport: Sailing
- Coached by: Gal Fridman
- Classes: RS:X, iQFoil
Medal record
Men's sailing
Representing Israel
Olympic Games
Gold medal – first place	2024 Paris	iQFoil
RS:X World Championships
Gold medal – first place	2019 Torbole	Men's U21
Gold medal – first place	2020 Sorrento	Men's U21
RS:X Youth World Championships
Gold medal – first place	2017 Torbole	Youth male
Bronze medal – third place	2016 Lymasol	Youth male

Tom Reuveny (Hebrew: תום ראובני; born 12 June 2000) is an Israeli windsurfer, who specializes in the RS:X and iQFoil classes. He won gold medals at the 2017 RS:X Youth World Championships, the 2019 RS:X World Championships Men's U21, and the 2020 RS:X World Championships Men's U21. Representing Israel at the 2024 Paris Olympics, Reuveny won the gold medal in the Men's iQFoil.

== Early life ==
Reuveny was born in Ramat Gan, Israel, lived in Kibbutz Sdot Yam, and lives in Rosh HaAyin, Israel, and is Jewish. He is the son of Ronen Reuveny, an exercise physiologist, and Kate Reuveny (née Brown), a technical writer. His father was born in Israel, while his mother is originally British and a Jewish convert. He has an older sister, Eden, and two younger brothers, including one who has been serving as a combat soldier in the Israel Defense Forces since the October 7 attacks. Reuveny's parents encouraged him to take up sports from a young age, and as a child he trained in several different sports, including cycling, swimming, tennis, and surfing.

== Windsurfing career ==
Reuveny's coach is Gal Fridman, who won the gold medal in windsurfing at the 2004 Olympic Games.

=== Early years ===
Reuveny starting surfing at eight years of age. At ten years of age, he began windsurfing.

He won a bronze medal at the 2016 RS:X Youth World Championships in Circolo Surf Torbole, Italy. He won the gold medal at the 2017 RS:X Youth World Championships. He won the gold medal at the 2019 RS:X World Championships Men's U21 in Torbole, Italy, and the gold medal in the 2020 RS:X World Championships Men's U21 in Sorrento, Victoria, Australia.

=== 2022–present ===
At the 2022 iQFoil World Championships held in Brest, France, Reuveny finished in fourth place.

In 2023, he won a bronze medal in a competition as part of the 2023 Sailing World Cup, the Princess Cup, in Palma, Spain.

In the 2024 iQFoil World Championships held in Lanzarote, Spain, Reuveny finished in eighth place. Shortly after the competition, the executive committee of the Israel Sailing Association selected Reuveny to represent Israel at the 2024 Summer Olympics. Reuveny was not considered a medal contender by the Israel Olympic Committee. During training, he said: "There are still hostages in Gaza and it was difficult training when the whole country is burning."

==== 2024 Paris Olympics ====
Reuveny, representing Israel at the 2024 Paris Olympics, won the gold medal in Men's iQFoil class in Marseille, France. He said: "I did it for our brave soldiers."

Israeli President Isaac Herzog said to him:

You floated on the surface of the water like something divine. You made a whole nation happy, a nation that is at war and a nation that prays for the return of those being held hostage.... our anthem was played, Hatikva, hope, for the first time in these Olympics....

== See also ==
- List of Jews in sailing
- List of Jewish Olympic medalists
- List of Olympic medalists in sailing by discipline
- List of flag bearers for Israel at the Olympics
