= Lee Korzits =

Israeli windsurfer

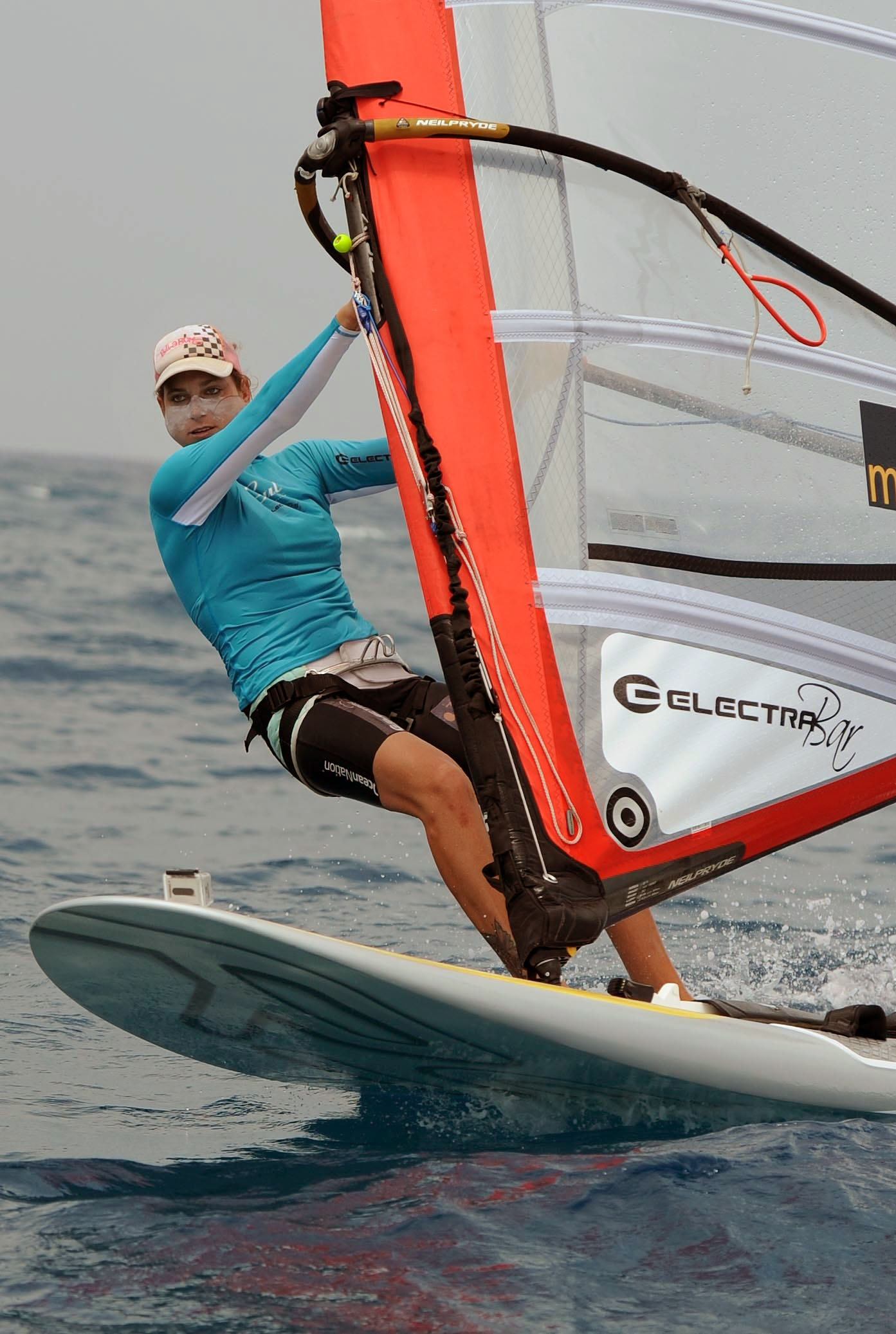

Personal information
- Native name: לי קורזיץ
- Nationality: Israeli
- Born: 25 March 1984 (age 42) Hofit, Israel
- Height: 1.79 m (5 ft 10 in)
- Weight: 63 kg (139 lb)

Sport
- Country: Israel
- Sport: Sailing
- Event: Windsurfing
- Club: Emek Hefer Sailing Club, Michmoret, Israel

Achievements and titles
- Olympic finals: 6th (2012)
- World finals: (gold) (2003, 2011, 2012, 2013)
- Regional finals: (silver) (2011)
Medal record
Women's windsurfing
Representing Israel
Windsurfing World Championships
Gold medal – first place	2003 Cádiz	Mistral
Gold medal – first place	2011 Perth	RS:X
Gold medal – first place	2012 Cádiz	RS:X
Gold medal – first place	2013 Armação dos Búzios	RS:X
RS:X European Championships
Silver medal – second place	2011 Burgas	RS:X

Lee (Lee-El) Korzits (Hebrew: לי (לִי-אֵל) קורזיץ; nicknamed Leeka; born 25 March 1984) is an Israeli windsurfer who has won four Windsurfing World Championships titles (in 2003, 2011, 2012, and 2013). She competed in the 2004 Olympics, finishing 13th, and at the 2012 Olympics, finishing 6th.

== Early life ==
Korzits was born in Hofit, Israel, to a Jewish family. Her mother is a swimmer and her father is a lifeguard. She grew up in the neighboring beach town of Michmoret, Israel, between Tel Aviv and Haifa. Her sister, Bar, and brother, Tom—who was her first coach, are both windsurfers. At 14 years of age, she was the top female judoka in her age group in Israel.

== Windsurfing career ==
Korzits started windsurfing at eight years of age. Her club is Emek Hefer Sailing Club, in Michmoret. She has been coached by Ben Finkelstein. She and rival and fellow former world champion Zofia Noceti-Klepacka of Poland got matching tattoos on their right arms in Israel, and Korzits said: "We come to fight on the water, and be friends on the beach."

Winning her first world title at the age of 19 in the Mistral One Design at the 2003 ISAF Sailing World Championships in Cádiz, Spain, Korzits became the first female Israeli world champion in any sport, and the youngest surfer ever to win the world title.

Korzits represented Israel at the 2004 Summer Olympics in Athens at the age of 20. She competed in the Women's Mistral One Design and finished in a disappointing 13th position.

In April 2005, while surfing in Hawaii, Korzits was severely injured and nearly killed after being hit by another surfer. The surfboard collided into her back, breaking two of her ribs, breaking her leg, and injuring her spine. At first the doctors thought that irreversible damage was caused to her spine, and told her that she might be paralyzed, might never walk again, and that they doubted whether she would be able to sail professionally again. She later returned to Israel for rehabilitation and made a full recovery. Her string of serious injuries kept her from competing, and she eventually lost her spot on the Israeli Olympic team for the Beijing 2008 Games to teammate Ma'ayan Davidovich. She returned to sailing in 2010, claiming that the injury had motivated her to do what she loves most. Then in 2010 at the European Championships in Poland, a competitor knocked her off her board, she became unconscious and trapped in the water beneath her sail, and she came within 30 seconds of drowning.

In September 2011 Korzits won a silver medal at the RS:X European Windsurfing Championships in Bulgaria, her first medal in a major competition since her world title in 2003.

Her success continued at the 2011 ISAF Sailing World Championships in Perth Australia, where she competed in the Women's RS:X and won her second world title. By winning the world title she became the first Israeli, male or female, to win two world titles at any sport. Readers of The Jerusalem Post voted her the 2011 Sports Personality of the Year.

In March 2012 she added her third world title at the 2012 RS:X World Championships in Cádiz, Spain.

Korzits represented Israel at the 2012 Summer Olympics in London at the age of 28. She was the # 1 qualifier in the world, based on her having won the 2011 ISAF Sailing World Championships. She competed in the Women's RS:X, was tied for the silver medal going into the last race, and finished 6th. Asked to comment, she said: "I did my best. The others did better." Still teary, she said: "I was proud to represent Israel. You can cry over a lost medal; there are more important things in life, like friendship."

In 2013 she won the world championships in Armação dos Búzios, Brazil. As of 2013, no other Israeli had ever won more world titles (other than paraplegic athletes), and no other Israeli had ever won a world title three times in a row.

She did not compete in the 2016 Olympics, due to her health issues.

== Awards and recognition ==
In 2017, Korzits was inducted into the International Jewish Sports Hall of Fame.

== Achievements ==
Year	Competition	Venue	Position	Event	Notes
2003	World Championships	(Spain) Cádiz	1st	Mistral	
2004	Olympic Games	(Greece) Athens	13th	Mistral	
2011	European Championships	(Bulgaria) Burgas	2nd	RS:X	
2011	World Championships	(Australia) Perth	1st	RS:X	
2012	World Championships	(Spain) Cádiz	1st	RS:X	
2012	Olympic Games	(United Kingdom) London	6th	RS:X	
2013	World Championships	(Brazil) Armação dos Búzios	1st	RS:X	

== See also ==
- List of select Jews in sailing
- Sports in Israel
