= Thomas Ashley =

Thomas Ashley may refer to:

- Thomas L. Ashley (1923–2010), American politician
- Tom Ashley (born 1984), New Zealand sailing champion
- Thomas Ashley (professor) from Lady Margaret's Professor of Divinity
- Clarence Ashley (1895–1967), also known as Tom Clarence Ashley, American musician and singer
