= 2019 RS:X World Championships =

World sailing championships class

2019 World Championships
- Location: Torbole, Italy
- Dates: September 22–28

The 2019 RS:X World Championships was held in Torbole, Italy from 22 September to 28 September, 2019.

== Medal summary ==
Event	Gold		Silver		Bronze	
Men's	Kiran Badloe; Netherlands	34	Dorian van Rijsselberghe; Netherlands	41	Pierre Le Coq; France	45
Women's	Lu Yunxiu; China	56	Katy Spychakov; Israel	60	Lilian de Geus; Netherlands	64
Men's U21	Tom Reuveny; Israel	104	Andy Brown; United Kingdom	175.7	Sil Hoekstra; Netherlands	172
Women's U21	Katy Spychakov; Israel	60	Giorgia Speciale; Italy	83	Emma Wilson; United Kingdom	84
