= Nick Dempsey =

British windsurfer

Personal information
- Nickname: Dempo
- Nationality: British
- Born: Nicholas Charles Dempsey; 13 August 1980 (age 46) Norwich, England
- Height: 1.80 m (5 ft 11 in)
- Weight: 70 kg (154 lb)

Sport
- Country: United Kingdom
- Sport: Windsurfing
- Event: Men's RS:X class
- Coached by: Dom Tidey
Medal record
Men's sailing
Representing Great Britain
Silver medal – second place	2016 Rio de Janeiro	RS:X
Silver medal – second place	2012 London	RS:X
Bronze medal – third place	2004 Athens	Mistral

Nicholas Charles Dempsey (born 13 August 1980 in Norwich) is a retired British windsurfer, who lives in Poole, Dorset. He became the first man to win three Olympics medals in windsurfing when he won silver in the 2016 Rio Olympics, adding to a silver won in the 2012 London Olympics, and a bronze from the 2004 Athens Olympics. He is also twice world champion, winning gold in 2009 and 2013.

== Career ==
Dempsey booked his first international success at the 1998 Mistral Youth World Championships, where he won the bronze medal. As a senior his first win was clinched at the North Sea Cup Series in Pevensey Bay, and an additional third place in the Kiel Week.

During the 2000 Summer Olympics he finished in 16th position. He continued winning competitions in 2001 and beyond like Athens Eurolymp Week, Kieler Woche and the Spa Regatta before finishing third at the 2004 Summer Olympics to take the windsurfing bronze medal.

When switching to the RS:X class he won race after race, resulting in the first spot on the RS:X world rankings. He took the gold medal at the 2006 RS:X European Championships. At the 2006 RS:X World Championships he finished in 5th position.

At the 2008 Summer Olympics he came 4th in the RS:X Class windsurfing class with 60 points. He was 2 points behind Israeli bronze medalist Shahar Tzuberi.

At the 2012 Summer Olympics, Dempsey won the silver medal in the RS:X Class windsurfing class, behind Dorian van Rijsselberge of the Netherlands.

In the 2016 Summer Olympics, Dempsey again won the silver in the RS:X Class, again behind van Rijsselberge. With three medals won in the Olympics, he became the most decorated men's Olympic windsurfer.

In 2017, Nick was awarded an Honorary Doctorate of Science by the University of Chichester.

== Personal life ==
Dempsey was married to yachtswoman Sarah Ayton from 2008 to 2012 with whom he has two sons He later married yachtswoman Hannah Mills with whom he has a daughter.

== Achievements ==
Year	Position	Windsurfing class	Event		
Olympic Games
2016	Silver medal	RS:X – Men's Windsurfer	2016 Olympic Games – Men's sailboard	Rio de Janeiro	(Brazil)
2012	Silver medal	RS:X – Men's Windsurfer	2012 Olympic Games – Men's sailboard	Portland	(United Kingdom)
2008	4.	RS:X – Men's Windsurfer	2008 Olympic Games – Men's sailboard	Qingdoa	(China)
2004	Bronze medal	Mistral – Men	2004 Summer Olympics	Athens	(Greece)
2000	16.	Mistral – Men	2000 Summer Olympics	Sydney	(Australia)
World Championships
2016	4	RS:X - Male	2016 RS:X World Championships		
2015	13	RS:X - Male	2015 RS:X World Championships		
2014	5	RS:X - Male	2014 ISAF Sailing World Championships		
2013	Gold medal	RS:X – Men's Windsurfer	2013 RS:X World Championships	Búzios	Brazil
2012	Silver medal	RS:X - Male	2012 RS:X World Championships		
2011	13	RS:X - Male	Perth 2011 ISAF Sailing World Championships		
2010	9	RS:X - Male	2010 RS:X World Championships		
2009	Gold medal	RS:X – Men's Windsurfer	2009 RS:X World Championships	Weymouth and Portland	United Kingdom
2008	6	RS:X - Male	2008 RS:X World Championships		
2007	Bronze medal	RS:X - Male	2007 ISAF Sailing World Championships		
2006	5	RS:X - Male	2006 RS:X World Championships		
2005	7	Raceboard Men	2005 Raceboard World Championships		
2003	6	Mistral Men	2003 ISAF Sailing World Championships		
2002	7	Mistral Men	2002 Mistral World Championship		
2001	8	Mistral Men	Mistral World Championships		
2000	23	Mistral Men	IMCO Mistral World Championships		
1999	24	Mistral Men	Mistral World Championships		
1998	26	Mistral Men	IMCO Mistral World Championships		
1998	Bronze medal	Mistral – Men	1998 Mistral Youth World Championships		(South Africa)
1997	23	Mistral - Juniors	Jnr, Yth & Masters Mistral World Championships Mistral Men		
1998	Bronze medal	Mistral	ISAF Youth Sailing World Championships		
1996	8	Aloha - Junior Male	1996 Aloha World Championships		
Others
2015	Gold medal	RS:X – Men's Windsurfer	2015 Sailing World Cup	Weymouth and Portland	United Kingdom
2006	Gold medal	RS:X – Men's Windsurfer	2006 RS:X European Championships		(Turkey)
2006	Gold medal	RS:X – Men's Windsurfer	Holland Regatta		(Netherlands)
2006	Silver medal	RS:X – Men's Windsurfer	Semaine Olympique Française		(France)
2006	Gold medal	RS:X – Men's Windsurfer	HRH Princess Sofia Trophy		(Spain)
2006	Gold medal	RS:X – Men's Windsurfer	Rolex Miami OCR		(United States)
2003	Gold medal	Mistral – Men	Saronikos Gulf Regatta		(Greece)
2003	Gold medal	Mistral – Men	XXXIV Princess Sofia Trophy		(Spain)
2003	Silver medal	Mistral – Men	Athens Eurolymp Week		(Greece)
2002	Silver medal	Mistral – Men	Kieler Woche		(Germany)
2002	Gold medal	Mistral – Men	North Sea Cup Series	Herne Bay	(United Kingdom)
2002	Gold medal	Mistral – Men	Spa Regatta		(Netherlands)
2002	Gold medal	Mistral – Men	Sail Auckland		(New Zealand)
2002	Silver medal	Mistral – Men	Sail Melbourne	(Australia)	
2001	Gold medal	Mistral – Men	Kieler Woche		(Germany)
2001	Gold medal	Mistral – Men	XXXII Princess Sofia Trophy		(Spain)
2001	Gold medal	Mistral – Men	Athens Eurolymp Week		(Greece)
2000	Bronze medal	Mistral – Men	Kieler Woche		(Germany)
2000	Gold medal	Mistral – Men	North Sea Cup Series	Pevensey Bay	(United Kingdom)
2000	Silver medal	Mistral – Men	Penta Mistral Cup		(Egypt)
