= Kiran Badloe =

Dutch windsurfer (born 1994)

Personal information
- Born: 13 September 1994 (age 31) Almere, Netherlands
- Height: 196 cm (6 ft 5 in)
- Weight: 73 kg (161 lb)

Sailing career
- Sport: Sailing
- Class(es): RS:X, IQFOiL, Techno 293
Medal record
Men's sailing
Representing the Netherlands
Olympic Games
| Gold medal – first place | 2020 Tokyo | RS:X |
World Championships
| Gold medal – first place | 2019 Torbole | RS:X |
| Gold medal – first place | 2020 Sorrento | RS:X |
| Gold medal – first place | 2021 Cádiz | RS:X |
| Silver medal – second place | 2018 Aarhus | RS:X |
| Bronze medal – third place | 2016 Eilat | RS:X |
European Championships
| Gold medal – first place | 2019 Mallorca | RS:X |
| Gold medal – first place | 2021 Vilamoura | RS:X |
| Bronze medal – third place | 2020 Vilamoura | RS:X |

Kiran Badloe (born 13 September 1994) is a Dutch windsurfer. He won the gold medal in the men's RS:X event at the 2020 Summer Olympics held in Tokyo, Japan. He also won the gold medal in the men's event at the RS:X World Championships in 2019, 2020 and 2021.

In October 2020, he competed at the iQFoil International Games held at Campione, Lake Garda.

At the 2020 Summer Olympics in Tokyo, Japan, he won gold for the Netherlands in windsurfing.

After his Olympic win, Badloe garnered media attention for the distinctive "blue colored arrow haircut" he sported during the competition. The hairstyle was an homage to the cartoon character Aang from the Avatar: The Last Airbender series. Badloe explained the show's connection to his haircut ahead of his medal race:

It's about a kid that controls the wind, and he needs to control all different kinds of elements of nature in order to do something great, and I'm doing the same here.

— Kiran Badloe

In March 2022, his portrait was added to a mural in the Schilderswijk neighbourhood of The Hague, Netherlands, alongside other Dutch competitors of the Summer or Winter Olympics and Paralympics held in 2021 and 2022.

In 2024, he became the winner of the television show Expeditie Robinson.

== See also ==
- List of European Championships medalists in sailing
