= 2021 RS:X World Championships =

- Venue: El Puerto de Santa María
- Location: Cádiz, Spain
- Dates: 23—27 April

The 2021 RS:X World Championships were held in Cádiz, Spain, from 23 to 27 April 2021.

== Medal summary ==
| Event | Gold | | Silver | | Bronze | |
|---|---|---|---|---|---|---|
| Men | Kiran Badloe; Netherlands | 22 | Mattia Camboni; Italy | 46 | Byron Kokkalanis; Greece | 56 |
| Women | Lilian de Geus; Netherlands | 29 | Katy Spychakov; Israel | 36 | Charline Picon; France | 36 |
| U21 Men | Nacho Baltasar Summers; Spain | 296 | Alejandro Arauz Garcia; Spain | 336 | Juan Pedro Beltran; Spain | 349 |
| U21 Women | Zoe Fernández; Spain | 173 | Lucia García-Cubillana Lopez; Spain | 228 | Carmen Sahuquillo Merchante; Spain | 238 |
