= 2020 RS:X World Championships =

2020 World Championships
- Location: Sorrento, Victoria, Australia
- Dates: 23 to 29 February 2020

The 2020 RS:X World Championships was held from 23 to 29 February 2020 in Sorrento, Victoria, Australia.

== Medal summary ==
Event	Gold		Silver		Bronze	
Men's	Kiran Badloe; Netherlands	37	Dorian van Rijsselberghe; Netherlands	39	Thomas Goyard; France	56
Women's	Lilian de Geus; Netherlands	42	Charline Picon; France	51	Noy Drihan; Israel	52
Men's U21	Tom Reuveny; Israel	106	Tom Arnoux; France	211	Geronimo Nores; United States	231
Women's U21	Giorgia Speciale; Italy	129	Veerle Ten Have; New Zealand	254	Manon Pianazza; France	265

=== Medal table ===
Rank	Nation	Gold	Silver	Bronze	Total
1	Netherlands (NED)	2	1	0	3
2	Israel (ISR)	1	0	1	2
3	Italy (ITA)	1	0	0	1
4	France (FRA)	0	2	2	4
5	New Zealand (NZL)	0	1	0	1
6	United States (USA)	0	0	1	1
Totals (6 entries)		4	4	4	12
