= Maja Dziarnowska =

Polish windsurfer (born 1990)

Maja Dziarnowska (born 7 August 1990 in Gdańsk) is a Polish windsurfer, Olympian from the 2024 Summer Olympics in Paris, World Championship silver medalist in Formula Windsurfing (2012, 2020) and Funboard (2016), and European Championship bronze medalist in iQFoil (2022).

== Career ==
At the age of 12, Dziarnowska started training at the Sopot Sailing Club. She graduated from the Jędrzej Śniadecki Academy of Physical Education and Sport in Gdańsk.

She achieved success in junior and youth categories. At the World Championships in the Mistral class, she won a gold medal in the U15 category in 2005 and a bronze medal in 2006. At the World Championships in the RS:X junior class, she won a silver medal in 2007 and a bronze medal in 2009 (edition 2008). At the Junior World Sailing Championships in 2008, she won a silver medal in the same class.

Dziarnowska represented Poland at the Senior World Championships in the RS:X class, achieving the following placements: 51st (2006), 48th (2008), 22nd (2009), 9th (2010), 5th (2012), 20th (2013), 35th (2015), 30th (2016), 46th (2017), 20th (2019), 8th (2020). At the Senior European Championships in the RS:X class, she placed: 21st (2010), 7th (2011), 8th (2012), 6th (2013), 5th (2014), 4th (2015), 8th (2016), 7th (2017), 22nd (2018), 6th (2019), 13th (2021). At the 2011 ISAF Sailing World Championships, she finished 18th in the RS:X class, at the 2014 ISAF Sailing World Championships - 32nd place, and at the 2018 Sailing World Championships - 22nd place. However, she lost the competition for the Olympic spot in this class in Poland to Zofia Noceti-Klepacka and Małgorzata Białecka.

In 2012 and 2020, she became the World Championship silver medalist in Formula Windsurfing, and in 2016, she was the World Championship silver medalist and in 2017, the bronze medalist in slalom in the Funboard class.

At the European Championships in the iQFoil class in 2022, she won a bronze medal. At the World Championships in the iQFoil class, she placed: 10th (2021), 10th (2022), and 7th (2024), and at the European Championships in the iQFoil class in other starts, she placed: 12th (2020), 11th (2021), 15th (2023). At the 2023 Sailing World Championships, she finished 19th in this class, and at the 2024 Summer Olympics in Paris, she finished 8th.

In 2012 and 2020, she received the Crystal Sail award from the Pomeranian Sailing Association in the category of Pomeranian Sailor of the Year.
