= Thomas Goyard =

French windsurfer

Personal information
- Nationality: French
- Born: 15 January 1992 (age 34)

Sport
- Sport: Sailing
- Club: ACPV Nouméa
Medal record
Men's sailing
Representing France
Olympic Games
Silver medal – second place	2020 Tokyo	Men's RS:X
RS:X Youth World Championships
Gold medal – first place	2010
Silver medal – second place	2009
RS:X World Championships
Bronze medal – third place	2014 Santander	RS:X
Bronze medal – third place	2020 Sorrento	RS:X
Formula Foil World Championships
Bronze medal – third place	2021
Bronze medal – third place	2022

Thomas Goyard (born 15 January 1992) is a French competitive sailor.

He won bronze medals at the RS:X World Championships in 2014 and 2020. He qualified to represent France at the 2020 Summer Olympics in Tokyo 2021, competing in the men's RS:X where he won the silver medal.
