= Paweł Tarnowski (sailor) =

Polish windsurfer

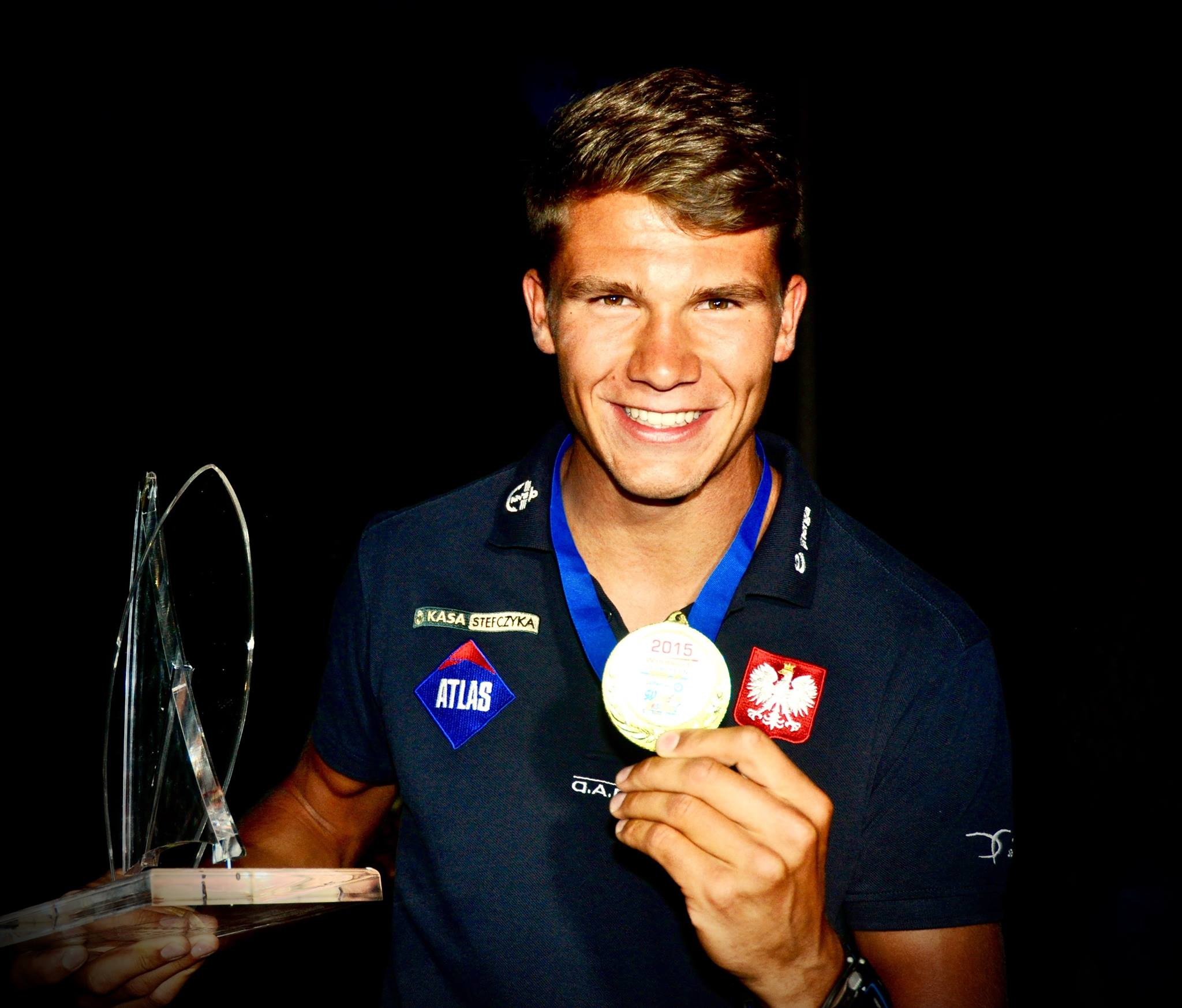
Tarnowski from the European Championship gold medal in RS: X in Mondello, Sicily, 2015

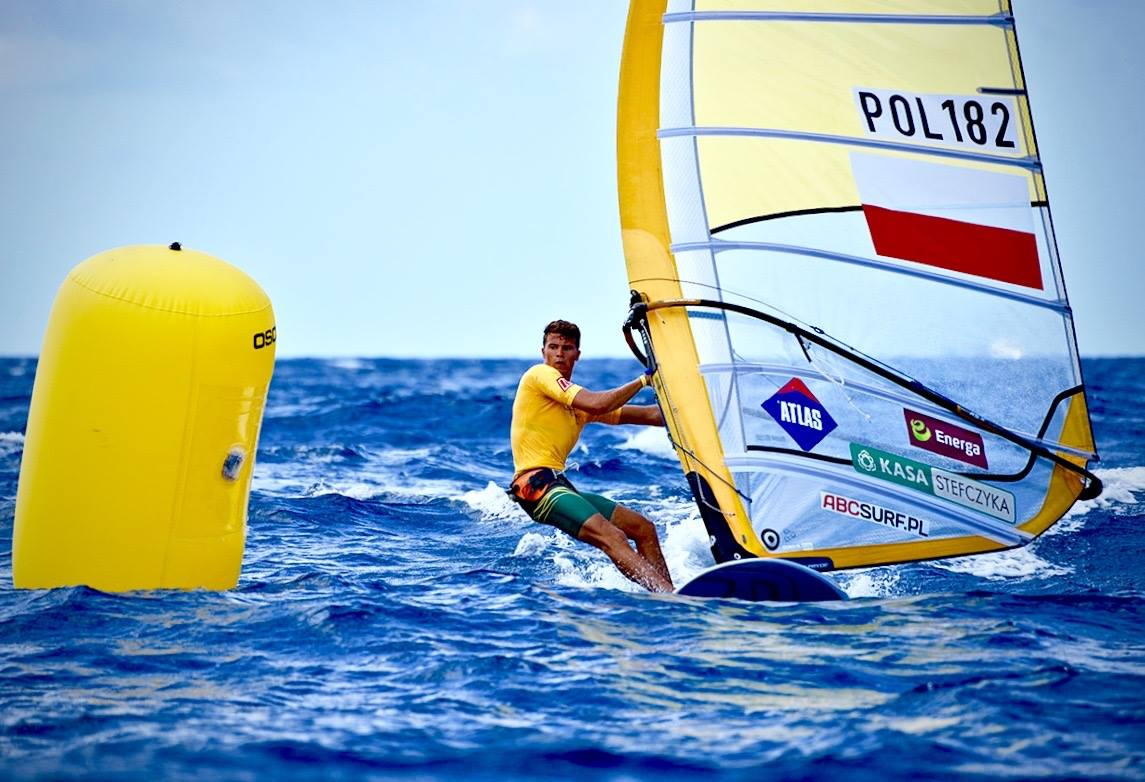
Tarnowski in Mondello, Sicily in June 2015

Paweł Aleksander Maria Tarnowski (born 3 April 1994) is a Polish sailor.

== Life ==
Tarnowski was born on 3 April 1994 in Gdynia. He is the son of Jacek Tarnowski (businessman, politician) and Monika Wanicka. Tarnowski already competed at the top-level when he was a teenager, becoming a multiple medal winner in Junior World Championships. In 2011 and 2012, he won a gold medal at the RS:X Junior World Championships, and he won medals in European Champion. In first he started in classes Techno 293 class and then the RS:X class, (including in a category age under 17 (U-17) and under 21 years of age (U-21). He competed in the 2024 Olympics in the iQfoil class and came 10th.

He is sometimes seen as a model in commercials, including polish company Atlas or on the cover of album Superheroes : Chapter One - Courage of the band Synthphonia.

== Achievements ==
Year	Position	Board type	Age category	Event
2006		RS:X - Men's Windsurfer	Youth	2006 RS:X France National Championship in Bandol, France
2007		RS:X - Men's Windsurfer	Junior	2008 RS:X European Championship in Cádiz, Spain
2007		Techno 293 class - Men's Windsurfer	Junior	2008 World Championships in Formentera, Spain
2008		Techno 293 class - Men's Windsurfer	Junior	2008 World Championships in Sopot, Poland
2010		RS:X - Men's Windsurfer	Junior	2010 Spain RS:X National Championship in Cádiz, Spain
2010		RS:X U-17 - Men's Windsurfer	Junior	2010 European Championship in Sopot, Poland
2010		RS:X U-17 - Men's Windsurfer	Junior	World Championships in Limassol, Cyprus
2010		RS:X - Men's Windsurfer	Junior	World Championships in Limassol, Cyprus
2010		RS:X - Men's Windsurfer	Junior	2010 RS:X World Championships in Istanbul, Turkey
2011		RS:X U-17 - Men's Windsurfer	Junior	2011 European Championship in Burgas, Bulgaria
2011		RS:X - Men's Windsurfer	Junior	2011 RS:X World Championships Sardinia, Italy
2012		RS:X U-21 - Men's Windsurfer	Junior	2012 European Championship in Madeira, Portugal
2012		RS:X - Men's Windsurfer	Junior	2012 European Championship in Tallinn, Estonia
2012		RS:X U-21 - Men's Windsurfer	Junior	World Championships in Cádiz, Spain
2012		RS:X - Men's Windsurfer	Junior	2012 RS:X World Championships Penghu, Taiwan
2013		RS:X U-21 - Men's Windsurfer	Senior	2013 European Championship in Brest, France
2013		RS:X - Men's Windsurfer	Senior	2013 RS:X CUP of Europ in Medemblik, the Netherlands
2013		RS:X U-21 - Men's Windsurfer	Senior	2013 World Championships in Armação dos Búzios, Brazil
2014		RS:X - Men's Windsurfer	Senior	2014 Brazil RS:X National Championship in Rio de Janeiro, Brazil
2014		RS:X - Men's Windsurfer	Senior	2014 Spain RS:X National Championship in Cádiz, Spain
2014		RS:X U-21 - Men's Windsurfer	Senior	2014 RS:X European Championship in Çeşme, Turkey
2014		RS:X - Men's Windsurfer	Senior	2014 RS:X CUP of Europ in Medemblik, the Netherlands
2014		RS:X U-21 - Men's Windsurfer	Senior	2014 World Championships in Santander, Spain
2015		RS:X - Men's Windsurfer	Senior	Delta Lloyd Regatta 2015 in Medemblik, the Netherlands
2015		RS:X - Men's Windsurfer	Senior	RS:X European Championship in Mondello, Italy
2016		RS:X - Men's Windsurfer	Senior	(Spain) 47 Princess Sofia Trophy 2016 in Palma de Mallorca
2016		RS:X - Men's Windsurfer	Senior	ISAF Sailing World Cup in Hyères in France
2016		RS:X - Men's Windsurfer	Senior	2016 RS:X European Windsurfing Championships & Open Trophy in Helsinki in Finland
2017		RS:X - Men's Windsurfer	Senior	XVII Carnival Trophy in El Puerto de Santa María in Spain
2017		RS:X - Men's Windsurfer	Senior	(Spain) 48 Princess Sofia Trophy 2017 in Palma de Mallorca
2017		RS:X - Men's Windsurfer	Senior	ISAF Sailing World Cup in Gamagori in Japan
2018		RS:X - Men's Windsurfer	Senior	(Spain) XIII Andalusian Olympic Week Bay of Cádiz in Cádiz
2018		RS:X - Men's Windsurfer	Senior	(Spain) 49 Princess Sofia Trophy 2018 in Palma de Mallorca
2018		Formula Windsurfing - Men's Windsurfer	Senior	(Poland) Konsal Formula Windsurfing European Championships 2018 in Puck
2018		Formula Windsurfing - Men's Windsurfer	Senior	(Poland) Konsal Formula Windsurfing European Championships 2018 in Puck
2019		RS:X - Men's Windsurfer	Senior	(Spain) XIV Andalusian Olympic Week Bay of Cádiz in Cádiz
2022		iQFoil - Men's Windsurfer	Senior	(Portugal) 2022 iQFoil International Games in Terceira - Azores Islands
2023		iQFoil - Men's Windsurfer	Senior	(Spain) Lanzarote iQFOIL International Games 2023 in Lanzarote 2023
2024		iQFoil- Men's Windsurfer	Senior	(Spain) Lanzarote iQFOIL International Games 2024 in Lanzarote 2024
2024		iQFoil- Men's Windsurfer	Senior	(Spain) 2024 iQFOIL Senior and Youth & Junior Games in Cádiz 2024
2024		iQFoil - Men's Windsurfer	Senior	(Spain) 53 Princess Sofia Trophy 2024 in Palma de Mallorca
2024		iQFoil - Men's Windsurfer	Senior	(Italy) 2024 iQFOiL European Championship in Cagliari

== See also ==
- List of iQFoil Windsurfing World Championships medalists
