= Lærke Buhl-Hansen =

Danish windsurfer

Personal information
- Nationality: Danish
- Born: 30 March 1992 (age 32); Aarhus, Denmark
- Height: 167 cm (5 ft 6 in)
- Weight: 56 kg (123 lb)

Sailing career
- Class(es): RS:X, IQFOiL
- Club: Århus Sejlklub

Lærke Buhl-Hansen (born 30 March 1992) is a Danish sailor. She placed 15th in the women's RS:X event at the 2016 Summer Olympics.
