= Maëlle Guilbaud =

Saint Barthélemy windsurfer (born 1996)

Personal information
- Nationality: French
- Born: 1996 (age 29–30) Saint Barthélemy

Sport
- Sport: Sailing
- Event: RS:X
- Turned pro: 2016

Maëlle Guilbaud (born 1996) is a French competitive windboard sailor, originally from Saint Barthélemy an Overseas collectivity of France. Beginning in the youth championships, she ranked as the French women's youth champion in 2013, 2014 and 2015, before turning professional the following year. At the end of the 2016 season she was the 3rd ranking woman in France and 13th in the world. In 2017, she won the Women's European title.

== Early life ==
Maëlle Guilbaud was born in St. Barth's in 1996 to Hélène (née Puren) and Pierrick Guilbaud. She came from a family of sailors, with both of her parents engaged in the sport. In 2011 after graduating from high school, she moved to France. Guilbaud competed in the youth division, winning the French Championship three times. Her first win of the French title was in 2013, and that same year she won the bronze medal for the RS:X Youth World Championships. After her last win of the youth championship in 2015, she turned pro.

== Career ==
In 2016, Guilbaud became a trainer at the School of Sablais Water Sports. Her first professional event was the PWA World Cup held in Ulsan, Korea that same year. She won the bronze medal in the IFCA Slalom World Championships held off the coast of the island of Brač in Croatia and she finished the year ranked 3rd in France and 13th in the world rankings.

In June 2017, Guilbaud competed with both of her parents in the 2nd Defy the Wind Caribbean Championship in Bonaire. Her father finished 20th in the competition, her mother finished with the silver for women and Guilbaud won the women's division. In July 2017, Guilbaud won the RS:One Convertible European Open Championships becoming the 2017 Women's European titleholder with her consistency in the event held in Brittany. In November 2017, she dominated in the inaugural foil windsurfing competition for the RS:Convertible world championship held in Praia da Vitória, in the Azores and finished in first place.
