= Maayan Davidovich =

Israeli windsurfer

Personal information
- Born: מעין דוידוביץ; May 21, 1988 (age 38) Herzliya, Israel
- Height: 5 ft 6 in (168 cm)
- Weight: 128 lb (58 kg)

Sport
- Country: Israel
- Sport: Sailing
- Event: Windsurfing
- Club: Hapoel Tel Aviv
- Coached by: Gal Friedman

Achievements and titles
- Olympic finals: 7th (2016)
- World finals: (bronze) (2013, 2014)
- Regional finals: (silver) (2012)
Medal record
Women's sailing
Representing Israel
World Championships
Bronze medal – third place	2013 Buzios	RS:X
Bronze medal – third place	2014 Santander	RS:X
European Championships
Silver medal – second place	2012 Portugal	RS:X

Maayan Davidovich (Hebrew: מעין דוידוביץ'; born May 21, 1988) is an Israeli Olympic windsurfer.

== Biography ==
Davidovich is Jewish, and her hometown is Herzliya, Israel. She competes with the club Hapoel Tel Aviv.

She started sailing at the age of five, and surfing at 13. Her parents enjoy watersports, and her brothers and twin sister were all windsurfing champions. She made her international competitive debut in the 1999 Optimist European Championships, in Greece.

In July 2005, she came in fourth in the Mistral – Women 35th Volvo Youth Sailing International Sailing Federation (ISAF) World Championship, in Busan, Korea. In July 2006, she won a silver medal at the RS:X – Women Volvo Youth Sailing ISAF World Championship, in Weymouth, Great Britain. In 2007, she finished 15th in the European Championships.

She competed on behalf of Israel at the 2008 Summer Olympics at the age of 19 in Beijing, China, in the women's sailboard windsurfing event, and came in 10th.

In June 2009, she came in seventh in the RS:X – Women European Championship, in Tel Aviv, Israel. In May 2011, she came in fourth in the RS:X – Women Delta Lloyd Regatta, in Medemblik, The Netherlands.

In both 2013 (when she was ranked 10th in the world in December) and 2014 (when she was ranked 14th in the world), she was the ISAF Worlds RS:X bronze medalist.

She represented Israel at the 2016 Summer Olympics, coming in 7th place in the RS:X.
