= Formentera del Segura =

Coordinates: 38°05′N 0°45′W

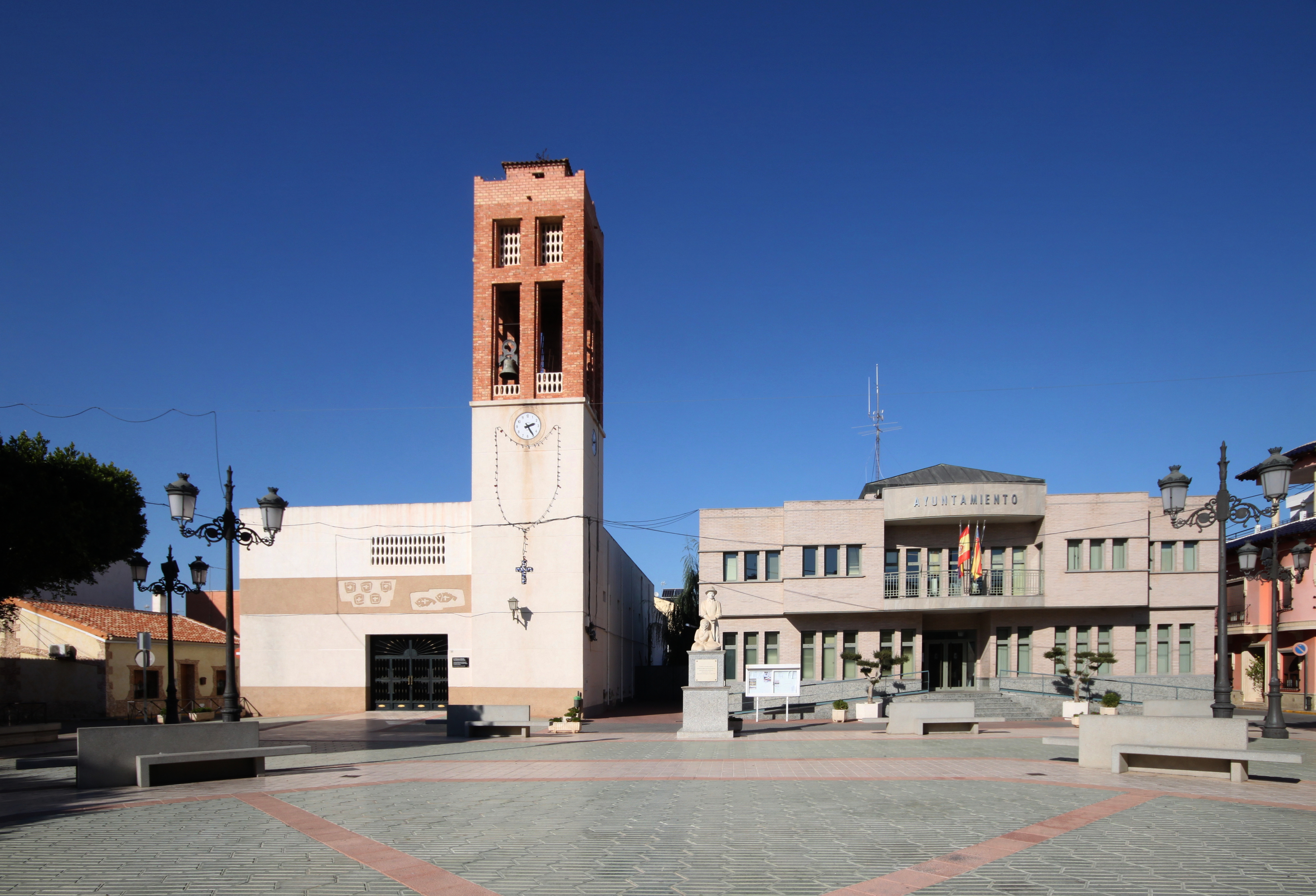
Formentera del Segura - Town Hall and Church

Formentera del Segura's flag

Formentera del Segura's coat of arms

Formentera del Segura is a municipality and village in the province of Alicante and autonomous community of Valencia, Spain. The municipality covers an area of 4.3 square kilometres (1.7 sq mi) and as of 2015 had a population of 4,206 people.
