= Chen Peina =

Chinese windsurfer

Personal information
- Nationality: Chinese
- Born: 19 June 1989 (age 37) Shantou, Guangdong
- Height: 172 cm (5 ft 8 in)
- Weight: 63 kg (139 lb)

Sailing career
- Sport: Sailing
- Club: Shenzhen Sailing Club
- Class: RS:X
Medal record
Olympic Games
Silver medal – second place	2016 Rio de Janeiro	Women's RS:X
World Championships
Gold medal – first place	2017 Enoshima	Women's RS:X
Gold medal – first place	2015 Al-Mussanah	Women's RS:X
Asian Games
Gold medal – first place	2018 Jakarta-Palembang	Women's RS:X
Universiade
Gold medal – first place	2011 Shenzhen	Women's RS:X

Chen Peina (Chinese: 陈佩娜; pinyin: chén pèi nà; born 19 June 1989 in Shantou, Guangdong) is a Chinese competitive sailor.

She competed at the 2016 Summer Olympics in Rio de Janeiro, where she won a silver medal in the women's RS:X.
