= Stefaniya Elfutina =

Russian windsurfer

Stefania Elfutina
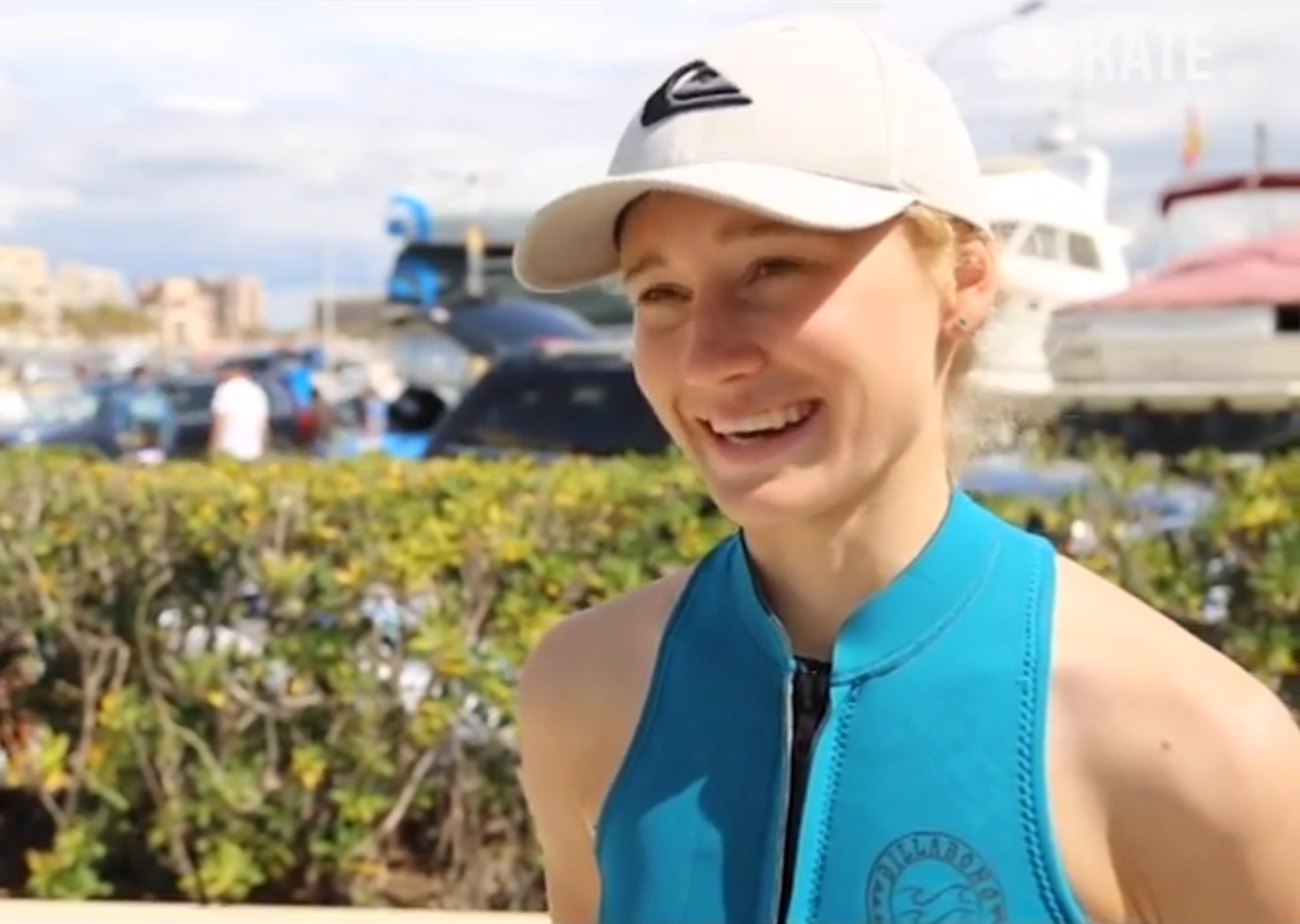
- Elfutina in 2016

Personal information
- Full name: Stefania Alexandrovna Elfutina
- Nickname: White Shark
- Nationality: Russian
- Born: 27 January 1997 (age 29) Yeysk, Russia

Sport
- Sport: Sailing
- Event: RS:X
- Club: Yacht Club Sochi
- Turned pro: 2009
- Coached by: Viktor Aivazian

Achievements and titles
- Highest world ranking: 2 (19 October 2015)
Medal record
Olympic Games
| Bronze medal – third place | 2016 Rio de Janeiro | RS:X |
World Championships
| Gold medal – first place | 2014 Tavira | Youth Worlds RS:X |
| Gold medal – first place | 2015 Langkawi | Youth Worlds RS:X |
| Gold medal – first place | 2017 Enoshima | RS:X (U21) |
| Gold medal – first place | 2013 Sopot | Techno 293 (U17) |
European Championships
| Silver medal – second place | 2017 Marseille | RS:X |
| Silver medal – second place | 2018 Sopot | RS:X |
| Bronze medal – third place | 2016 Helsinki | RS:X |

Stefania Alexandrovna Elfutina (Russian: Стефания Александровна Елфутина; born 27 January 1997) is a Russian competitive sailor. Her first medal in a senior event was winning bronze at the 2016 European Sailing Championships in Helsinki.

Elfutina won a bronze medal at the 2016 Summer Olympics in Rio de Janeiro, in the women's RS:X.
