= Marina Alabau =

Spanish windsurfer (born 1985)

Personal information
- Nationality: Spanish
- Born: Marina Alabau Neira; 31 August 1985 (age 40) Seville, Spain
- Height: 1.64 m (5 ft 5 in)
- Weight: 55 kg (121 lb)

Sailing career
- Sport: Sailing
Medal record
Women's sailboard
Representing Spain
Olympic Games
Gold medal – first place	2012 London	RS:X
World Championships
Gold medal – first place	2009 Weymouth	RS:X
Silver medal – second place	2006 Torbole	RS:X
Silver medal – second place	2014 Santander	RS:X
Bronze medal – third place	2008 Auckland	RS:X
Bronze medal – third place	2011 Perth	RS:X
European Championships
Gold medal – first place	2007 Limassol	RS:X
Gold medal – first place	2008 Brest	RS:X
Gold medal – first place	2009 Tel-Aviv	RS:X
Gold medal – first place	2010 Sopot	RS:X
Gold medal – first place	2012 Madeira	RS:X
Mediterranean Games
Silver medal – second place	2018 Tarragona	RS:X
- Updated on 6 August 2012

Marina Alabau Neira (born 31 August 1985 in Seville) is a Spanish sailor. She has won a gold medal, one silver medal in 2006 and two bronze medals at the Windsurfing World Championships. She also won five gold medals at the European Championships. At the 2012 Summer Olympics, she won the gold medal in the RS:X competition.

== Achievements ==
Year	Position	Boat type	Event
2012		RS:X - Women's Windsurfer	(United Kingdom) 2012 Summer Olympics
2006		RS:X - Women's Windsurfer	(Italy) 2006 RS:X World Championships
2006		RS:X - Women's Windsurfer	(France) Semaine Olympique Française
2006		RS:X - Women's Windsurfer	(Spain) HRH Princess Sofia Trophy
2006		RS:X - Women's Windsurfer	(Spain) Andalusian Olympic Week
2006		RS:X - Women's Windsurfer	(United States) Rolex Miami OCR
2004		Mistral - Women	(Bulgaria) 2004 Mistral World Youth Championships

== See also ==
- List of Olympic medalists in sailing

Awards
Preceded by Edurne Pasaban	Spanish Sportswoman of the Year; 2012	Succeeded by Mireia Belmonte
