= 2017 RS:X World Championships =

Event details
- Venue: Enoshima, Japan
- Dates: 16–23 September
- Titles: 2

The 2017 RS:X World Championships was held in Enoshima, Japan between September 16 and September 23.

== Medalists ==
Event	Gold		Silver		Bronze	
Men's	Ye Bing (CHN)	51	Mateo Sanz Lanz (SUI)	53	Gao Mengfan (CHN)	68
Women's	Chen Peina (CHN)	44,7	Wu Jiahui (CHN)	50	Lu Yunxiu (CHN)	56
Men's U21	Ángel Granda (ESP)	123	Mestre Adrien (FRA)	157,6	Ofek Elimelech (ISR)	183
Women's U21	Stefania Elfutina (RUS)	74	Huang Xianting (CHN)	96	Berenice Mege (FRA)	119
