= Lu Yunxiu =

Chinese Olympic windsurfer

Personal information
- Nationality: Chinese
- Born: 6 September 1996 (age 30) Zhangzhou, Fujian, China

Sailing career
- Sport: Sailing
- Classes: RS:X, IQFOiL
Medal record
Women's sailing
Representing China
Olympic Games
Gold medal – first place	2020 Tokyo	Women's RS:X
World Championships
Gold medal – first place	2019 Torbol	Women's RS:X
Bronze medal – third place	2018 Aarhus	Women's RS:X
Bronze medal – third place	2017 Enoshima	Women's RS:X

Lu Yunxiu (Chinese: 卢云秀, born 6 September 1996) is a Chinese windsurfer. She is the 2020 Olympic champion in Women's RS:X. The discipline is being retired from the Olympics, which also makes her the last Olympic champion in Women's RS:X.

Lu is from Zhangzhou, Fujian. She was born in 1996 in the city of Duxun. Since 2008, she specialized in track and field, but eventually switched to windsurfing and was selected by the Fujian Provincial Sailing and Windsurfing Center.
