= Bryony Shaw =

British windsurfer (born 1983)

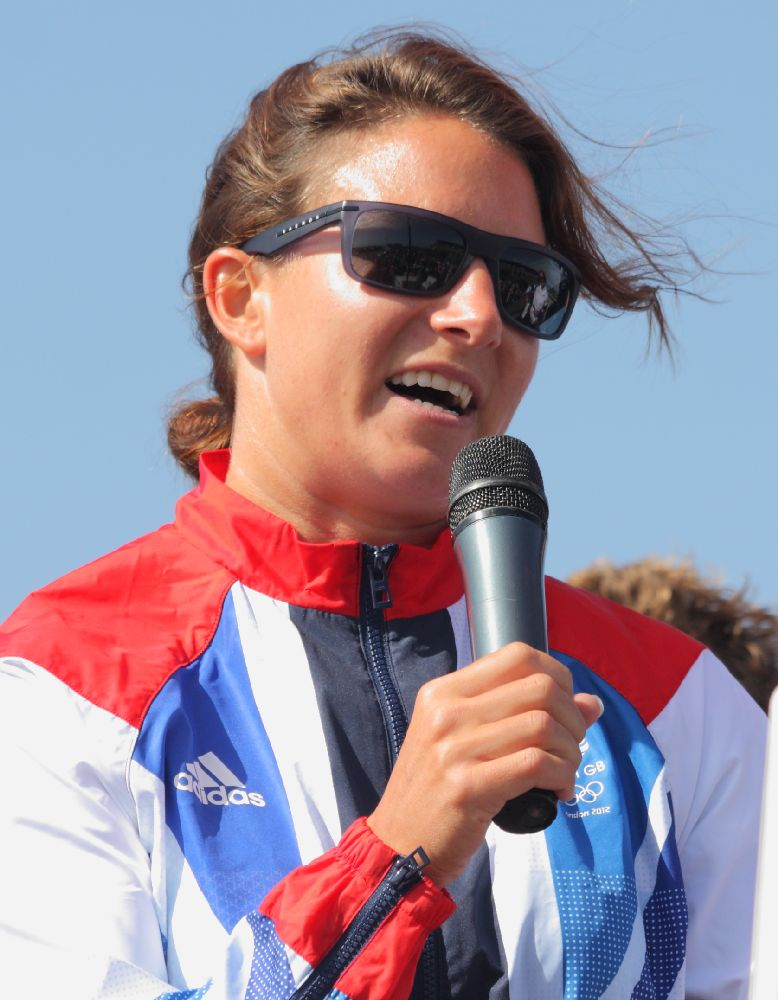
- Bryony Shaw in the 2012 Olympic Parade in Weymouth & Portland

Personal information
- Full name: Bryony Elisabeth Shaw
- Born: 28 April 1983 (age 43) Wandsworth

Sailing career
- Sport: Sailing
Medal record
Sailing
Representing Great Britain
Olympic Games
Bronze medal – third place	2008 Beijing	Sailboard
World Championships
Silver medal – second place	2013 Búzios	Women's RS:X
Silver medal – second place	2015 Muscat	Women's RS:X
Silver medal – second place	2016 Eilat	Women's RS:X
European Championships
Gold medal – first place	2015 Sicily	Women's RS:X
Silver medal – second place	2006 Alaçatı	Women's RS:X
Bronze medal – third place	2012 Tel Aviv	Women's RS:X

Bryony Elisabeth Shaw (born 28 April 1983 in Wandsworth) is a British Olympic windsurfer.

== Early life ==
She first began windsurfing in the south of France in 1992. She attended Cheney Upper School near Headington in Oxford (where her father had been teaching at Oxford Brookes University), gaining A levels in art, maths, and biology. She had windsurfed on Farmoor Reservoir to the west of Oxford. She went to Cardiff University to study architecture, and she stayed for a year before committing to windsurfing full time in 2005.

== Windsurfing ==
She won the bronze medal in the women's RS:X class at the 2008 Summer Olympics, the first ever women's windsurfing medal for the British Olympic team. She trains at the Weymouth and Portland National Sailing Academy.

Shaw won silver at the 2013, 2015, and 2016 RS:X World Championships, and 5th at the 2014 ISAF Sailing World Championships.

2008 Summer Olympic regatta

	Points												
Race	1	2	3	4	5	6	7	8	9	10	Medal race	Net	Position
	4	3	11	6	~~OCS~~	6	5	3	1	2	2	45	3

== See also ==
- Nick Dempsey, another Olympic windsurfer from Weymouth
