= Małgorzata Białecka =

Polish windsurfer (born 1988)

Personal information
- Nationality: Polish
- Born: April 2, 1988 (age 38) Gdynia, Poland
- Height: 1.64 m (5 ft 4 1/2 in)
- Weight: 54 kg (119 lb)

Sport
- Country: Poland
- Sport: Sailing
- Event: Windsurfing
Medal record
Women's Windsurfing
Representing Poland
Windsurfing World Championships
Gold medal – first place	2016 Eilat	RS:X
Summer Universiade
Bronze medal – third place	2011 Shenzhen	RS:X

Małgorzata Białecka (born 2 April 1988 in Gdynia) is a Polish windsurfer, In her career she won the Windsurfing World Championships in 2016. She competed at 2016 Olympic Games where she placed 14th.

== Achievements ==
Year	Competition	Venue	Position	Event	Notes
2008	World Championships	(New Zealand) Auckland	13th	RS:X	
2009	World Championships	(United Kingdom) Weymouth	16th	RS:X	
2010	World Championships	(Denmark) Kerteminde	20th	RS:X	
2011	Universiade	(China) Shenzhen		RS:X	
2012	World Championships	(Spain) Cádiz	51st	RS:X	
2013	World Championships	(Brazil) Armação dos Búzios	18th	RS:X	
2014	World Championships	(Spain) Santander	17th	RS:X	
2015	World Championships	(Oman) Al-Musannah	5th	Rs:X	
2016	World Championships	(Israel) Eilat		RS:X	
