= Alessandra Sensini =

Italian windsurfer

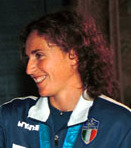
- Sensini in 2000

Personal information
- Nationality: Italian
- Born: 26 January 1970 (age 56) Grosseto, Italy
- Height: 1.70 m (5 ft 7 in)
- Weight: 55 kg (121 lb)

Sport
- Country: Italy
- Sport: Sailing
- Event: Windsurfing
Medal record
Representing Italy
Olympic Games
Gold medal – first place	2000 Sydney	Mistral
Silver medal – second place	2008 Beijing	RS:X
Bronze medal – third place	1996 Atlanta	Mistral
Bronze medal – third place	2004 Athens	Mistral
Windsurfing World Championships
Gold medal – first place	1990	Mistral
Gold medal – first place	2000 Mar del Plata	Mistral
Gold medal – first place	2004 İzmir	Mistral
Gold medal – first place	2006 Torbole	RS:X
Gold medal – first place	2008 Auckland	RS:X
Silver medal – second place	1997 Perth	Mistral
Silver medal – second place	2002 Pattaya	Mistral
Silver medal – second place	2010 Kerteminde	RS:X
Bronze medal – third place	2012 Cádiz	RS:X

Alessandra Sensini (born 26 January 1970 in Grosseto) is an Italian windsurfer. She is a 4-time Olympian, winning a gold medal and three additional medals. She also won 3 gold, 2 silver medals and 1 bronze at World Championships, as well as 3 gold, 2 silver and 2 bronze medals at European Championships.

She has sailed in three different windsurfing classes: Lechner A-390, Mistral and RS:X.

== Biography ==
Alessandra Sensini was one of four candidates for the role of flagbearer for Italy at the 2012 London Olympics. The others were Federica Pellegrini, Josefa Idem, and Valentina Vezzali, who was finally chosen.

== Achievements ==
Year	Position	Windsurfing class	Event
Olympics
2012	9th	RS:X - Women's	(United Kingdom) 2012 Summer Olympics
2008		RS:X - Women	(China) 2008 Summer Olympics
2004		Mistral - Women	(Greece) 2004 Summer Olympics
2000		Mistral - Women	(Australia) 2000 Summer Olympics
1996		Mistral - Women	(United States) 1996 Summer Olympics
1992	7th	Lechner - Women	(Spain) 1992 Summer Olympics
World Championships
2012		RS:X - Women's	(Spain) 2012 RS:X World Championships
2011	11	RS:X - Women's	(Australia) 2011 RS:X World Championships (Combined Olympic Classes Worlds)
2010		RS:X - Women's	(Denmark) 2010 RS:X World Championships
2007	5	RS:X - Women's	(Portugal) 2007 RS:X World Championships (Combined Olympic Classes Worlds)
2006		RS:X - Women's Windsurfer	(Italy) 2006 RS:X World Championships
2004		Mistral - Women	(Turkey) 2004 Mistral World Championships
2003	9	Mistral - Women	2003 Mistral World Championships (Combined Olympic Classes Worlds)
2002		Mistral - Women	(Thailand) 2002 Mistral World Championships
2000		Mistral - Women	(Argentina) 2000 Mistral World Championships
1999	8	Mistral - Women	1999 Mistral World Championships
1998	4	Mistral - Women	1998 Mistral World Championships
1997		Mistral - Women	(Australia) 1997 Mistral World Championships
1996	10	Mistral - Women	1996 Mistral World Championships
1995	9	Mistral - Women	1995 Mistral World Championships
1992	10	Lechner - Women	Lechner World Championships
1991	8	Lechner - Women	Lechner World Championships
1991	4	Lechner - Women	IYRU Women's World Championships
1990		Lechner - Women	IYRU Women's World Championships
1988		Mistral - Women	IYRU Women's World Championships
1988	8	Mistral - Girls	IYRU Youth Sailing World Championships
1987	11	Mistral - Women	IYRU Women's World Championships
1987		Mistral - Girls	IYRU Youth Sailing World Championships
1986	16	Mistral - Girls	IYRU Youth Sailing World Championships
Continental Championships
2003		Mistral - Women	(Italy) 2003 Mistral European Championships
2002		Mistral - Women	(Austria) 2002 Mistral European Championships
2001		Mistral - Women	(France) 2001 Mistral European Championships
2000		Mistral - Women	(Spain) 2000 Mistral European Championships
1999		Mistral - Women	(Poland) 1999 Mistral European Championships
1999		Mistral - Women	(Australia) Mistral Oceanic Continental Championship
1998		Mistral - Women	(Greece) 1998 Mistral European Championships
1997		Mistral - Women	(Spain) 1997 Mistral European Championships
Others
		Mistral - Women	(Germany) Kiel Week
		Mistral - Women	(Italy) Olympic Garda - Eurolymp
		Mistral - Women	(Greece) Athens Eurolymp Week
2003		Mistral - Women	(Spain) XXXIV Princess Sofia Trophy
2003		Mistral - Women	(Greece) Athens Eurolymp Week
2002		Mistral - Women	(Greece) Athens 2002 Regatta
2002		Mistral - Women	(France) Semaine Olympique Française
2002		Mistral - Women	(Spain) XXXIII Princess Sofia Trophy
2000		Mistral - Women	Championnat de France Voile Olympique
2000		Mistral - Women	(Italy) Roma Sail Week Anzio
2000		Mistral - Women	(Egypt) Penta Mistral Cup
1999		Mistral - Women	(Italy) XIV Windsurf Festival
1999		Mistral - Women	(Netherlands) Spa Regatta
1999		Mistral - Women	Championnat de France Voile Olympique
1999		Mistral - Women	(France) Semaine Olympique Française
1999		Mistral - Women	(Italy) Roma Sail Week Anzio
1998		Mistral - Women	(Italy) Sicily Grand Prix
1998		Mistral - Women	(Italy) Roma Sail Week
1998		Mistral - Women	(Italy) Preolympic Week Genoa
1997		Mistral - Women	(Australia) Australian International Regatta
1997		Mistral - Women	(Italy) Windsurf Festival Palermo
1997		Mistral - Women	(France) Semaine Olympique Française
1997		Mistral - Women	(Italy) Roma Sail Week Anzio
1997		Mistral - Women	(Italy) Preolympic Week Genoa
1996		Mistral - Women	(France) Semaine Olympique Française
1996		Mistral - Women	(United States) Sport St. Petersburg
1995		Mistral - Women	(Spain) 1995 Christmas Race
1991		Lechner - Women	(Spain) II Trofeo Ciutat de Barcelona
1991		Lechner - Women	(Netherlands) Spa Regatta

== See also ==
- Italian sportswomen multiple medalists at Olympics and World Championships
- Women multiple medallist at the Windsurfing World Championships
