= Casper Bouman =

Dutch windsurfer (born 1985)

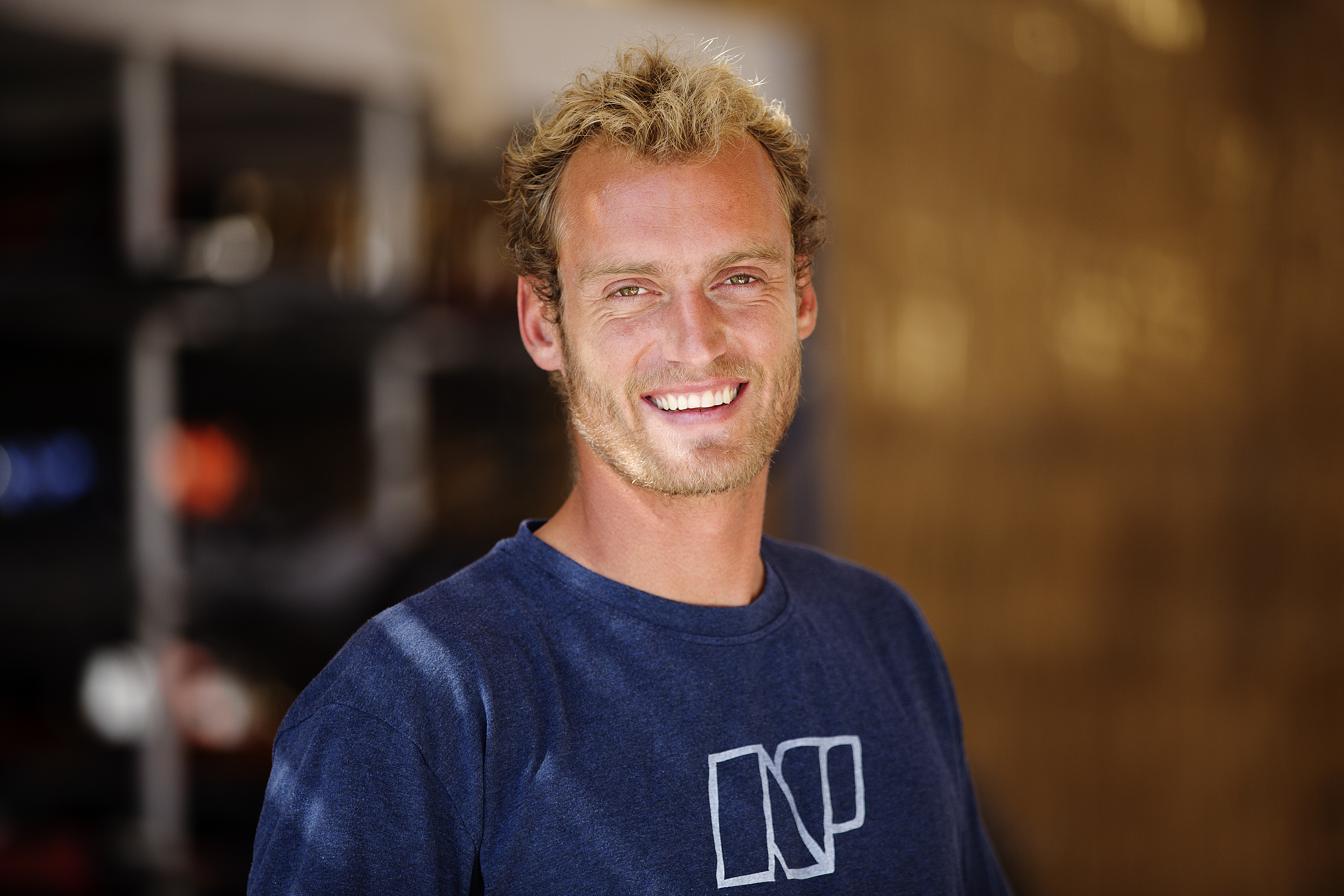

Personal information
- Full name: Casper Bouman
- Nationality: Dutch
- Born: 2 October 1985 (age 41) The Hague
- Height: 1.93 m (6.3 ft)

Sailing career
- Sport: Sailing
- Club: Jumpteam Scheveningen
- Class: RS:X
Medal record
Representing Netherlands
World Championships
Gold medal – first place	2006 Torbole	Men's RS:X
- Updated on 12 February 2014

Casper Bouman (born 2 October 1985, in The Hague) is a windsurfer from the Netherlands. Bouman represented his country at the 2008 Summer Olympics in Qingdao. Bouman took 15th place on the Men's RS:X.

Nowadays Bouman is Sports coach and Professional Surfer.
