= Lilian de Geus =

Dutch windsurfer (born 1991)

Personal information
- Nationality: Dutch
- Born: 13 October 1991 (age 34) Blaricum, Netherlands
- Height: 1.64 m (5 ft 5 in)
- Weight: 57 kg (126 lb)

Sailing career
- Sport: Sailing
- Club: WSV Almere Centraal
- Class(es): RS:X, IQFOiL, IKA - Formula Kite
Medal record
Women's sailing
Representing the Netherlands
World Championships
Gold medal – first place	2018 Aarhus	RS:X
Gold medal – first place	2020 Sorrento	RS:X
Gold medal – first place	2021 Cádiz	RS:X
Bronze medal – third place	2015 Al-Mussanah	RS:X
Bronze medal – third place	2016 Eilat	RS:X
Bronze medal – third place	2019 Torbole	RS:X
European Championships
Gold medal – first place	2019 Mallorca	RS:X
Silver medal – second place	2021 Vilamoura	RS:X

Lilian de Geus (born 13 October 1991) is a Dutch sailor. She represented her country at the 2016 Summer Olympics in the RS:X windsurfer, achieving 4th place overall.

== See also ==
- List of European Championships medalists in sailing
