= 2014 ISAF Sailing World Championships =

Sailing World Championships

Event title
- Edition: 4th

Event details
- Venue: Santander, Spain
- Dates: 8–21 September 2014
- Titles: 10

Competitors
- Competitors: Approx 1,250
- Competing nations: 83
- Qualification(s): 2016 Summer Olympics

The 2014 ISAF Sailing World Championships, was held in Santander, Spain, this was the fourth edition of the ISAF Sailing World Championships. It is the world championships for all disciplines used at the upcoming Olympics. What gives this event greater significance is that it was used as qualification for the 2016 Summer Olympics in Brazil.

== Bidding process ==
The following cities competed against Santander to win the right to host the Championships.

- Buenos Aires, Argentina
- Kingston, Ontario, Canada
- Qingdao, China
- Aarhus, Denmark
- Busan, South Korea
- The Hague, Netherlands
- Gdynia, Poland

== Events and equipment ==
The following events were open for entries:

Event	Equipment	Max. entries
Men's one-person dinghy	Laser	150
Men's one-person dinghy (heavyweight)	Finn	80
Men's two-person dinghy	470	120
Men's skiff	49er	100
Men's windsurfer	RS:X	120
Women's one-person dinghy	Laser Radial	120
Women's two-person dinghy	470	80
Women's skiff	49er FX	80
Women's windsurfer	RS:X	80
Mixed multihull	Nacra 17	80

== Summary ==
=== Medal table ===
* Host nation (Spain)

Rank	Nation	Gold	Silver	Bronze	Total
1	France (FRA)	3	0	1	4
2	Netherlands (NED)	2	0	0	2
3	Australia (AUS)	1	1	2	4
4	New Zealand (NZL)	1	1	0	2
5	Great Britain (GBR)	1	0	3	4
6	Austria (AUT)	1	0	0	1
6	Brazil (BRA)	1	0	0	1
8	Croatia (CRO)	0	2	0	2
8	Denmark (DEN)	0	2	0	2
10	Argentina (ARG)	0	1	0	1
10	Poland (POL)	0	1	0	1
10	Spain (ESP)*	0	1	0	1
10	Sweden (SWE)	0	1	0	1
14	Belgium (BEL)	0	0	1	1
14	Greece (GRE)	0	0	1	1
14	Israel (ISR)	0	0	1	1
14	Italy (ITA)	0	0	1	1
Totals (17 entries)		10	10	10	30

=== Event medalists ===
Event	Gold	Silver	Bronze
Men's 470	Australia; Mathew Belcher; Will Ryan	Croatia; Šime Fantela; Igor Marenić	Greece; Panagiotis Mantis; Pavlos Kagialis
Women's 470	Austria; Lara Vadlau; Jolanta Ogar	New Zealand; Jo Aleh; Polly Powrie	Great Britain; Hannah Mills; Saskia Clark
49er	New Zealand; Peter Burling; Blair Tuke	Denmark; Jonas Warrer; Anders Thomsen	Australia; Nathan Outteridge; Iain Jensen
49er FX	Brazil; Martine Grael; Kahena Kunze	Denmark; Ida Marie Baad Nielsen; Marie Thusgaard Olsen	Italy; Giulia Conti; Francesca Clapcich
Finn	Giles Scott (GBR)	Ivan Kljaković Gašpić (CRO)	Edward Wright (GBR)
Laser	Nicholas Heiner (NED)	Tom Burton (AUS)	Nick Thompson (GBR)
Laser Radial	Marit Bouwmeester (NED)	Josefin Olsson (SWE)	Evi Van Acker (BEL)
Nacra 17	France; Billy Besson; Marie Riou	Argentina; Santiago Lange; Cecilia Carranza	Australia; Jason Waterhouse; Lisa Darmanin
Men's RS:X	Julien Bontemps (FRA)	Przemysław Miarczyński (POL)	Thomas Goyard (FRA)
Women's RS:X	Charline Picon (FRA)	Marina Alabau (ESP)	Maayan Davidovich (ISR)
