= Tom Ashley =

New Zealand Olympic sailer

Tom Ashley ONZM
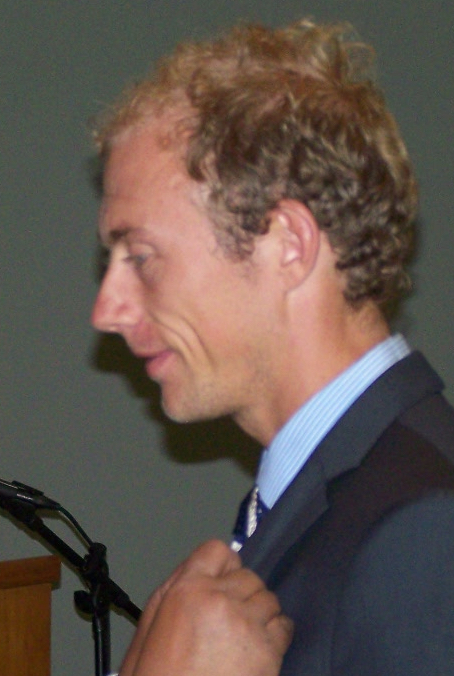
- Ashley in 2009

Personal information
- Full name: Thomas John Mitchell Ashley
- Born: 11 February 1984 (age 42) Auckland, New Zealand
Medal record
Men's sailing
Representing New Zealand
Olympic Games
Gold medal – first place	2008 Beijing	Men's sailboard

Thomas John Mitchell Ashley ONZM (born 11 February 1984 in Auckland) is a sailor from New Zealand, who won the gold medal in the men's sailboard event at the 2008 Summer Olympics, he also won the 2008 RS:X World Championships.

Ashley placed 2nd two years previous at the 2006 World Championships. During the event the top-10 sailors were selected to sail the final race, called the medal race. Before the start of the medal race Ashley was in first position, only one point in front of Casper Bouman from the Netherlands. Bouman finished second in the medal race, one position in front of Ashley. Both sailors then had the same points (23), but Bouman was crowned as the World champion thanks to his better position during the medal race.

In the 2009 New Year Honours, Ashley was appointed an Officer of the New Zealand Order of Merit, for services to board sailing.

In December 2017, Ashley was appointed chief executive of Canoe Racing New Zealand.

== Personal life ==
Ashley attended Westlake Boys High School in Auckland.

After the 2008 Olympics Ashley became a lawyer.

== Achievements ==
Year	Position	Boat type	Event
2010		RS:X – Men's Windsurfer	(Spain) HRH Princess Sofia Trophy
2010		RS:X – Men's Windsurfer	(New Zealand) Singapore Airlines Sail Auckland
2009		RS:X – Men's Windsurfer	(New Zealand) Singapore Airlines Sail Auckland
2008		RS:X – Men's Windsurfer	(China) 2008 Olympic Games – Men's sailboard
2008		RS:X – Men's Windsurfer	(New Zealand) 2008 RS:X World Championships
2006		RS:X – Men's Windsurfer	(Italy) 2006 RS:X World Championships
2006		RS:X – Men's Windsurfer	(Austria) ISAF World Sailing Games
2006		RS:X – Men's Windsurfer	(Spain) HRH Princess Sofia Trophy
2006		RS:X – Men's Windsurfer	(New Zealand) Sail Auckland International Regatta
2006		RS:X – Men's Windsurfer	New Zealand RS:X National Championship
2004		Mistral – Men	(France) Semaine Olympique Française
2003		Mistral – Men	(New Zealand) Sail Auckland
2003		Mistral – Men	(Australia) Sail Melbourne
2002		Mistral – Men	(Canada) ISAF Youth Sailing World Championships
2002		Mistral – Men	(Spain) IMCO Mistral Youth World Championships

== Club memberships ==
Ashley is a member of:

- Takapuna Boating Club http://www.takapunaboating.org.nz
- The Devonport Pony Club http://www.devonportponyclub.co.nz
- The New Zealand RSX Association http://www.yachtingnz.org.nz
