= Charline Picon =

French windsurfer

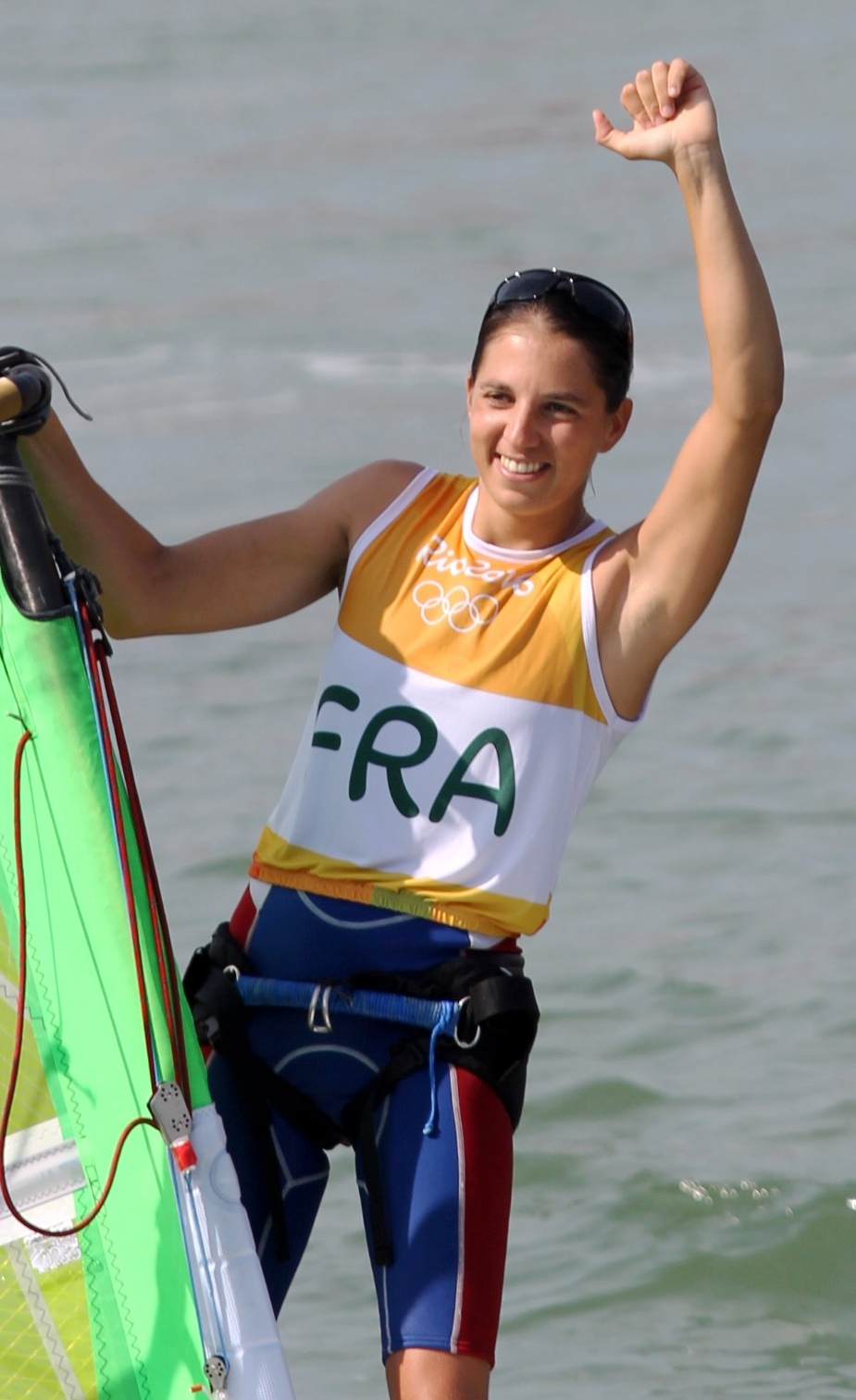
- Picon at the 2016 Summer Olympics

Personal information
- Nickname: Pic
- Born: 23 December 1984 (age 41) Royan, France
- Height: 1.69 m (5 ft 7 in)
- Weight: 57 kg (126 lb)

Sailing career
- Sport: Sailing
- Club: Palmyr Atlantic Voile; Club Nautique de la Tremblade; French Navy's Armee des Champions
- Coached by: Cedric Leroy (national)
- Class: Sailboard
Medal record
Women's sailing
Representing France
Olympic Games
Gold medal – first place	2016 Rio de Janeiro	RS:X
Silver medal – second place	2020 Tokyo	RS:X
Bronze medal – third place	2024 Paris	49er FX
World Championships
Gold medal – first place	2014 Santander	RS:X
Silver medal – second place	2018 Aarhus	RS:X
Silver medal – second place	2020 Sorrento	RS:X
Bronze medal – third place	2009 Weymouth	RS:X
Bronze medal – third place	2010 Kerteminde	RS:X
Bronze medal – third place	2021 Cádiz	RS:X
European Championships
Gold medal – first place	2013 Brest	RS:X
Gold medal – first place	2014 Alacati	RS:X
Gold medal – first place	2016 Helsinki	RS:X
Gold medal – first place	2020 Vilamoura	RS:X
Gold medal – first place	2021 Vilamoura	RS:X
Silver medal – second place	2008 Brest	RS:X
Bronze medal – third place	2019 Mallorca	RS:X

Charline Picon (born 23 December 1984) is a French windsurfer who specialized in the Neil Pryde RS:X class. She captured two bronze medals in her respective class at the Windsurfing World Championships (2009 and 2010), and an Olympic title at the 2016 Summer Olympics after attaining a top ten finish at the 2012 Summer Olympics. As of September 2014, Picon is ranked as one of the top ten sailors in the world for the sailboard class by the International Sailing Federation, following her successes at the European and World Championships and at the Sailing World Cup series.

Picon competed in the women's RS:X class at the 2012 Summer Olympics in London by finishing eighth and receiving a berth from the World Championships in Perth, Western Australia. Having awarded a guaranteed slot in the medal race from the opening series, Picon sailed through the final stretch to edge out Italian windsurfer and 2000 Olympic champion Alessandra Sensini and Canada's top favorite Nikola Girke for an eighth spot in a net score of 89 points.

At the 2014 ISAF Sailing World Championships in Santander, Spain, Picon sailed against an immense fleet of windsurfers to pick up a gold medal in the women's RS:X class, accumulating a net score of 27 points, and securing a spot on the French squad to compete for her second Olympics.

Picon took up windsurfing aged 11. She is a physiotherapist by education. Until 2006 she competed in the Aloha and Mistral classes, and only later changed to RS:X. During the 2008–09 season she had a shoulder surgery and returned to competitions in September 2009.
