= Dorian van Rijsselberghe =

Dutch windsurfer (born 1988)

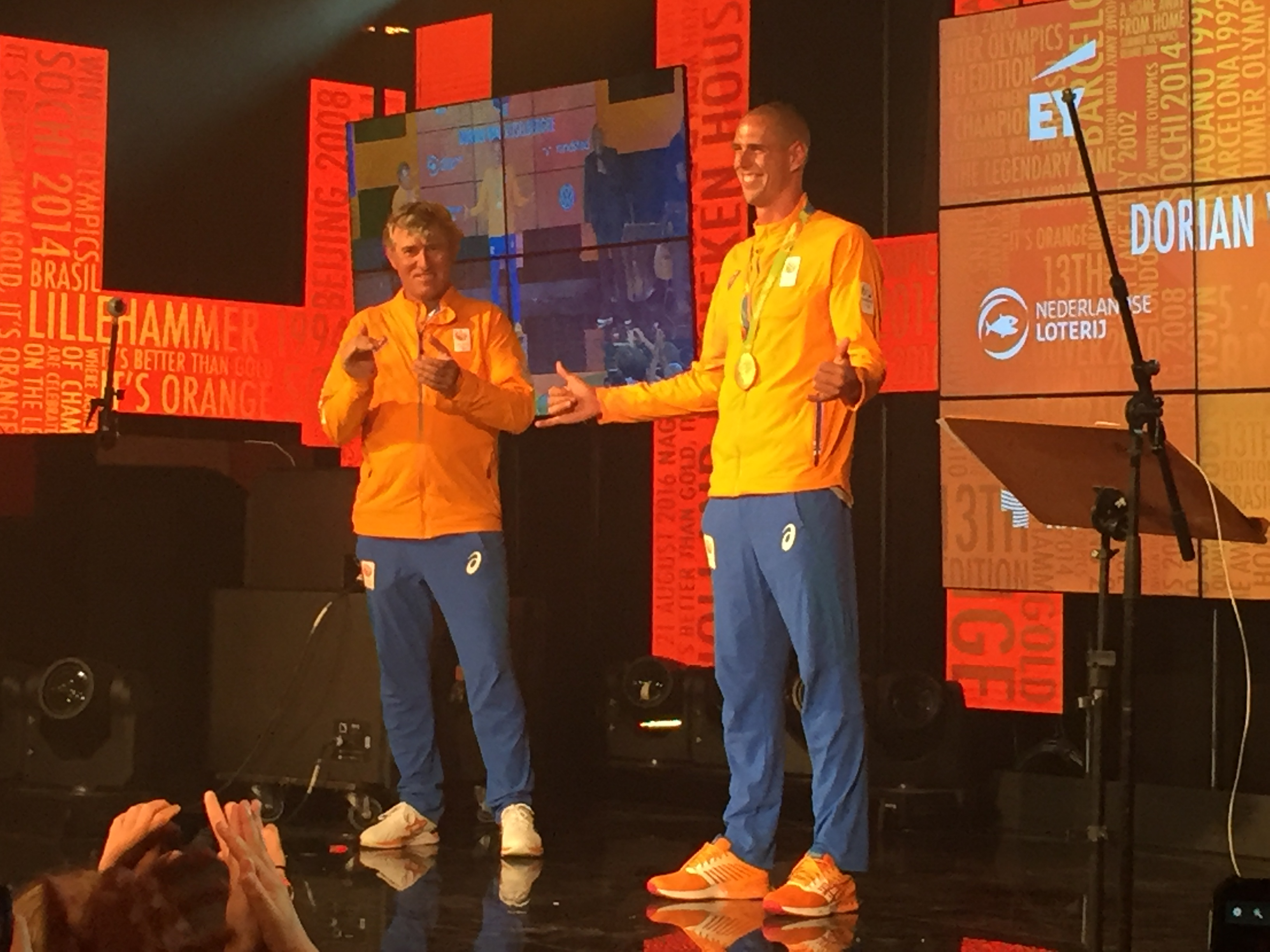
- Van Rijsselberghe in 2016

Personal information
- Full name: Dorian Benno Eric van Rijsselberge
- Nationality: Dutch
- Born: 24 November 1988 (age 37) Den Burg, Netherlands
- Height: 1.89 m (6.2 ft)

Sport

Sailing career
- Class: RS:X
- Club: Waddenteam
Competition record
Representing the Netherlands
Olympic Games
Gold medal – first place	2012 London	RS:X
Gold medal – first place	2016 Rio de Janeiro	RS:X
World Championships
Gold medal – first place	2011 Perth	RS:X
Gold medal – first place	2018 Aarhus	RS:X
Silver medal – second place	2013 Armação dos Búzios	RS:X
Silver medal – second place	2016 Eilat	RS:X
Silver medal – second place	2019 Garda	RS:X
Bronze medal – third place	2009 Weymouth	RS:X
Bronze medal – third place	2015 Al-Musannah	RS:X
European Championships
Silver medal – second place	2015 Palermo	RS:X
- Updated on 27 February 2016

Dorian van Rijsselberghe (born 24 November 1988) is a Dutch windsurfer.

He won his first Dutch title when he was 13.

Van Rijsselberghe on the Dutch RS:X won the gold medals at the 2012 Olympics in Weymouth, and the 2016 Olympics in Rio de Janeiro.

== Personal life ==
Van Rijsselberghe was a student at CIOS. Van Rijsselberghe has two daughters.

== 2012 Olympics ==
Van Rijsselberghe dominated the competition completely by finishing first among the 38 competitors in 7 out of 10 races, second twice and third once. After the ninth race, he had accumulated a sufficient lead over the second placed Nick Dempsey to be certain to win the gold medal – as long as he competed in the remaining races – irrespective of his results in the 10th race and in the medal race.

Olympic Games
Preceded by Jeroen Delmee	Flagbearer for Netherlands; London 2012	Succeeded by Jeroen Dubbeldam
