= RS:X =

Windsurfing class

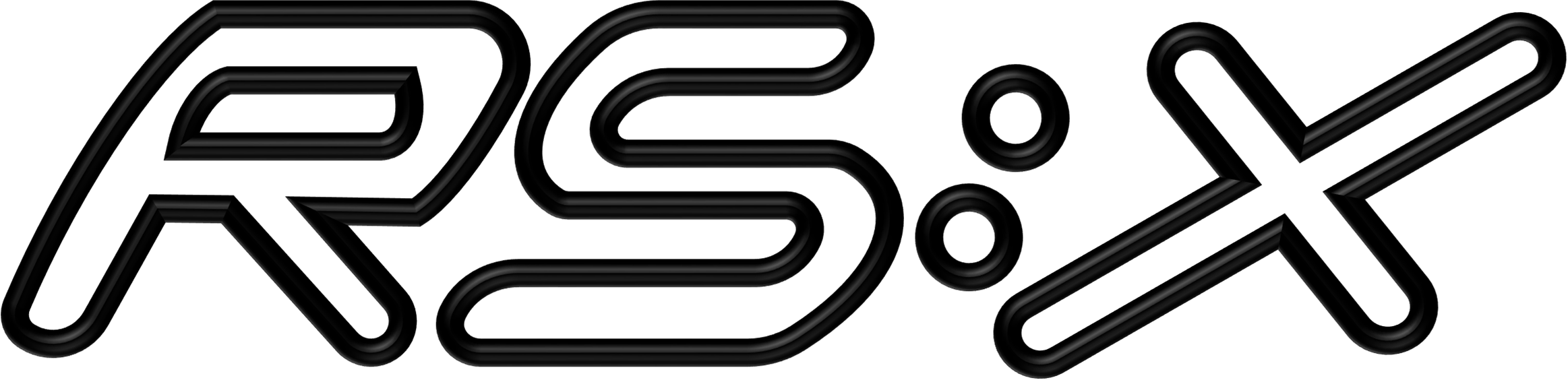
- Insignia

Development
- Designer: Jean Bouldoires & Robert Stroj
- Year: 2004
- Design: One Design; Neil Pryde
- Name: RS:X

Boat
- Crew: 1

Hull
- Type: Sailboard
- Construction: GRP & Carbon
- Hull weight: 15.5 kg (34 lb); Volume 231 L (51 imp gal; 61 US gal)
- LOA: 2.86 m (9 ft 5 in)
- Beam: .93 m (3 ft 1 in)

Rig
- Mast height: male: 5.2 m (17 ft) female: 4.9 m (16 ft)

Sails
- Mainsail area: male: 9.5 m^{2} (102 sq ft) female: 8.5 m^{2} (91 sq ft)

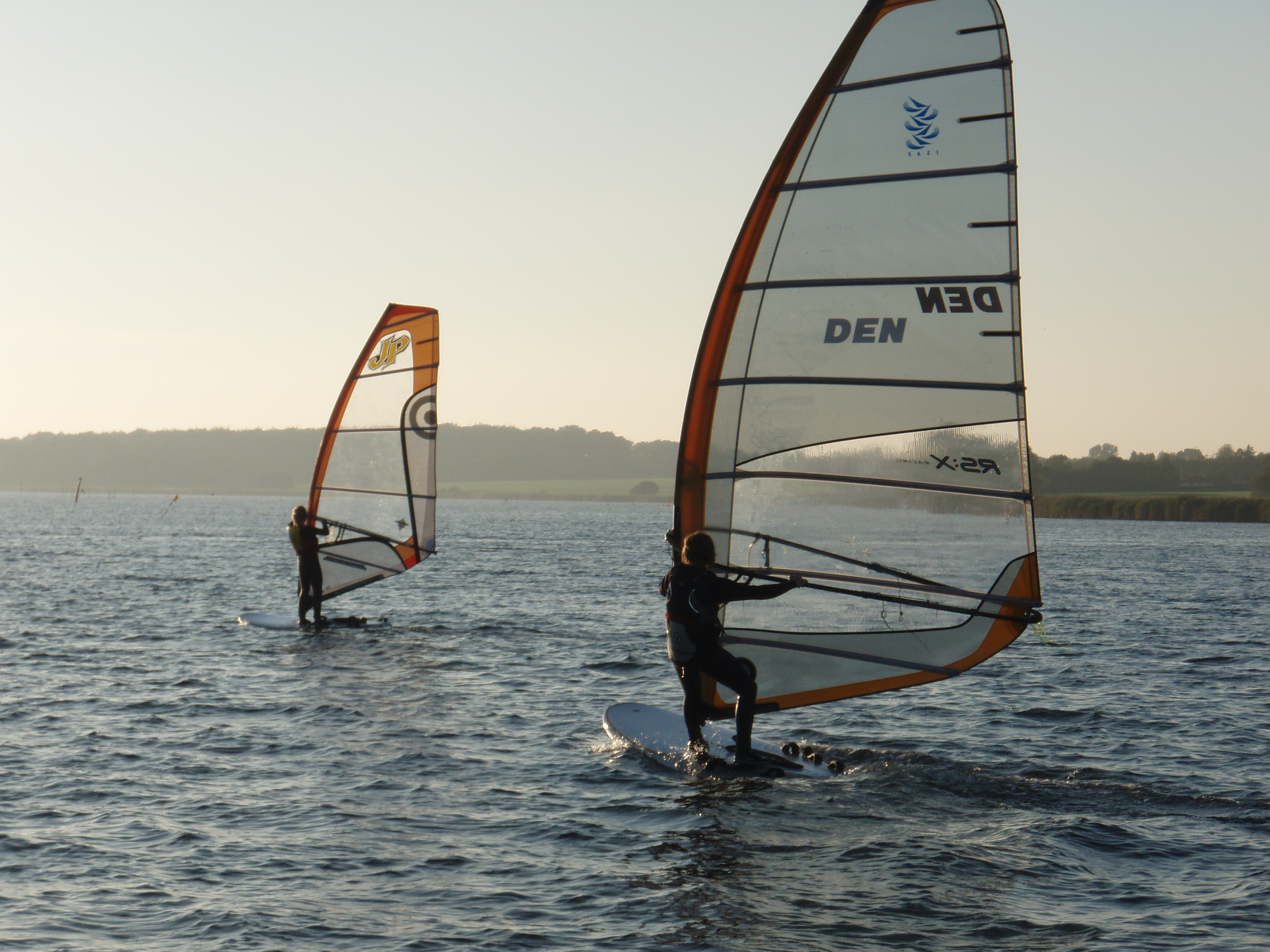

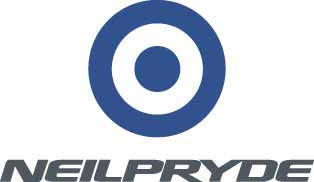

RS:X is a windsurfing class selected by the ISAF to replace the Mistral One Design Class for the 2008 Summer Olympics. The discipline has similarities to Formula Windsurfing - mainly in that the equipment used was designed to allow windsurfing in low and moderate wind conditions with good performance.

RS:X equipment includes a board with a daggerboard, and a sail of a specified size. The board measures 286 cm in length and 93 cm in width. Unlike formula boards, it is quite heavy at 15.5 kg, which is almost twice that of regular competition formula boards, but is very similar to the weight of raceboards such as the previous Olympic board, Mistral One Design Class. The Mistral board has a weight of 17 kg ready to sail, while the RS:X board weighs more than 19 kg.

The RS:X seems to be a compromise between traditional raceboards which work well in 5 to 35 kn (3 to 18 m/s), and Formula boards which go fast in 12 to 30 kn (5 to 15 m/s), and has shown itself to be competitive with past raceboards in the medium wind range.

The shape and design of the RS:X sail is based on that of the Neil Pryde windsurfing sail V8.

Starting with the 2024 Summer Olympics the IQFoil class has been selected to replace RS:X.

== Events ==
The RS:X was the windsurfing equipment used in the Olympics from 2008 to 2020. The class during this period had two annual World Championships international sailing regatta the RS:X World Championships and the RS:X Youth World Championships, these were organized by the host club on behalf of the International RS:X Class Association and recognized by World Sailing, the sports IOC recognized governing body. In addition the RS:X was used for Youth Sailing World Championships which is run entirely by World Sailing this unlike the class youth world championship is limited to one competitor per country.

=== Olympics ===
==== Men ====
Games	Gold	Silver	Bronze
2008 Beijing	Tom Ashley; New Zealand	Julien Bontemps; France	Shahar Tzuberi; Israel
2012 London	Dorian van Rijsselberghe; Netherlands	Nick Dempsey; Great Britain	Przemysław Miarczyński; Poland
2016 Rio de Janeiro	Dorian van Rijsselberghe; Netherlands	Nick Dempsey; Great Britain	Pierre Le Coq; France
2020 Tokyo	Kiran Badloe; Netherlands	Thomas Goyard; France	Bi Kun; China

==== Women ====
Games	Gold	Silver	Bronze
2008 Beijing	Yin Jian; China	Alessandra Sensini; Italy	Bryony Shaw; Great Britain
2012 London	Marina Alabau; Spain	Tuuli Petäjä; Finland	Zofia Klepacka; Poland
2016 Rio de Janeiro	Charline Picon; France	Chen Peina; China	Stefania Elfutina; Russia
2020 Tokyo	Lu Yunxiu; China	Charline Picon; France	Emma Wilson; Great Britain

=== World Championships ===
==== World Sailing - Youth Sailing World Championships ====
The RS:X has been used as equipment in the World Sailing own Youth Sailing World Championships which is for sailors under 19 but unlike the class Youth Worlds limited to one competitor per nations and is a multi class regatta.

=== Class Youth World Championships ===
The RS:X Class hold its own Youth World Championships the age limit used was either 19 or 21 depending on the event.

Event			Host			Fleet	Sailors			Ref.
Ed.	Date	Year	Host club	City	Country	Fleet	No.	Nat.	Cont.	Ref.
1	27Jul -5Aug	2007		Sopot	Poland	Male	65	13	2	
1	27Jul -5Aug	2007		Sopot	Poland	Female	29	9	3	
2	10-19 Jan	2008		Pattaya	Thailand	Male	36	16	4	
2	10-19 Jan	2008		Pattaya	Thailand	Female	13	7	2	
3	25Jul -1Aug	2009		Bodrum	Turkey	Male		13	3	
3	25Jul -1Aug	2009		Bodrum	Turkey	Female		11	2	
4	23-31 Oct	2010		Limassol	Cyprus	Male	70	14	3	
4	23-31 Oct	2010		Limassol	Cyprus	Female	38	13	2	
5	20-26 Oct	2011		Cagliari	Italy	Male	86	19	3	
5	20-26 Oct	2011		Cagliari	Italy	Female	28	10	4	
6	20-27 Oct	2012		Pengu Island	Chinese Taipei	Male	42	17	5	
6	20-27 Oct	2012		Pengu Island	Chinese Taipei	Female	23	12	5	
7	20-26 Oct	2013	Lega Navale Civitavecchia	Civitavecchia	Italy	Male	79	17	5	
7	20-26 Oct	2013	Lega Navale Civitavecchia	Civitavecchia	Italy	Female	41	13	3	
N/A	18-25 Oct	2014	Bney Herzliya Sailing Club	Herzliya	Israel	CANCELLED DUE TO POLITICS				
8	18-25 Oct	2014	Clearwater Community Sailing Centre	Clearwater, Florida	United States	U19 - Male	54	16	4	
8	18-25 Oct	2014	Clearwater Community Sailing Centre	Clearwater, Florida	United States	U19 - Female	28	14	4	
9	11-18 Jul	2015	Gdynia Sports and Recreation Center	Gdynia	Poland	U19 - Male	98	28	5	
9	11-18 Jul	2015	Gdynia Sports and Recreation Center	Gdynia	Poland	U19 - Female	38	17	4	
10	19-26 Nov	2016	Limassol Nautical Club	Limassol	Cyprus	Male	72	16	3	
10	19-26 Nov	2016	Limassol Nautical Club	Limassol	Cyprus	Female	25	11	3	
11	22Jun -1Jul	2017	Circolo Surf Torbole	Nago–Torbole, Lake Garda	Italy	Male	97	22	4	
11	22Jun -1Jul	2017	Circolo Surf Torbole	Nago–Torbole, Lake Garda	Italy	Female	40	14	4	
12	1-8 Jul	2018		Plage du Steir, Penmarch	France	Male	95	17	4	
12	1-8 Jul	2018		Plage du Steir, Penmarch	France	Female	35	10	2	
13	4-11 Aug	2019	St. Petersburg Yacht Club, Russia		Russia	Male	69	16	5	
13	4-11 Aug	2019	St. Petersburg Yacht Club, Russia		Russia	Female	35	12	3	

=== Medallists - Male ===
Edition	Gold	Silver	Bronze
2007	Christian Freimüller (GER)	Richard Hamilton (GBR)	Pierre Le Coq (FRA)
2008	Ho Tsun Leung (HKG)	Piotr Myszkowski (POL)	Thiseas Kampas (GRE)
2009	Michalis Malekkides (CYP)	Thomas Goyard (FRA)	Manfredi Misuraca (ITA)
2010	Thomas Goyard (FRA)	Michalis Malekkides (CYP)	Pawel Tarnowski (POL)
2011	Pawel Tarnowski (POL)	Louis Giard (FRA)	Sam Sills (GBR)
2012	Pawel Tarnowski (POL)	Kieran Martin (GBR)	Martin Olmeta (FRA)
2013	Mattia Camboni (ITA)	Mayan Rafic (ISR)	Bautista Saubidet Birkner (ARG)
2014	Radoslaw Furmanski (POL)	Mattia Camboni (ITA)	Toni Bonet Macias (ESP)
2015	Yoav Omer (ISR)	Francisco Saubidet Birkner (ARG)	Titouan Le Bosq (FRA)
2016	Yoav Omer (ISR)	Camille Bouyer (FRA)	Tom Reuveny (ISR)
2017	Tom Reuveny (ISR)	Luca Di Tomassi (ITA)	Andy Brown (GBR)
2018	Fabien Pianazza (FRA)	Mateo Dussarps (FRA)	Nicolo Renna (ITA)
2019	Eyal Yohay Zror (ISR)	Daniel Basik Tashtash (ISR)	Ruven Hillel (ISR)

=== Medallists - Female ===
Edition	Gold	Silver	Bronze
2007	Moana Delle (GER)	Maja Dziarnowska (POL)	Regina Stadler (GER)
2008	Laura Linares (ITA)	Hei Man H V Chan (HKG)	Maja Dziarnowska (POL)
2009	Izzy Hamilton (GBR)	Leonore Bosch (FRA)	Lo Sin Lam (HKG)
2010	Izzy Hamilton (GBR)	Hanna Zembrzuska (POL)	Hélène Noesmoen (FRA)
2011	Agnieszka Bilska (POL)	Kamila Smektala (POL)	Barbara Dmuchowska (POL)
2012	Naomi Cohen (ISR)	Saskia Sills (GBR)	Jeanne Dantès (FRA)
2013	Marta Maggetti (ITA)	Hadas Hochster (ISR)	Maëlle Guilbaud (FRA)
2014	Emma Wilson (GBR)	Berenice Mege (FRA)	Marta Maggetti (ITA)
2015	Noy Drihan (ISR)	Stefania Elfutina (RUS)	Berenice Mege (FRA)
2016	Katy Spychakov (ISR)	Noy Drihan (ISR)	Mariam Sekhposyan (RUS)
2017	Maya Morris (ISR)	Emma Wilson (GBR)	Kazami Matsuura (JPN)
2018	Giorgia Speciale (ITA)	Naama Gazit (ISR)	Linoy Geva (ISR)
2019	Yana Reznikova (RUS)	Manon Pianazza (RUS)	Naama Greenberg (ISR)

==== Others ====
- Sailing World Cup

== See also ==
- Neil Pryde
- World Championships in Sailing
- Youth Sailing World Championships
- Sailing World Championships
- Sailing at the Summer Olympics
- RS:X World Championships
