= 2016 Women's International Match Racing Series =

Event title
- Edition: 4th
- Dates: 27 June – 4 December

Results
- Winner: (Sweden) Anna Östling

The 2016 Women's International Match Racing Series was a series of match racing sailing regattas staged during 2016 season.

== Regattas ==
2016 regattas

Date	Regatta	City	Country	Equipment
27 June – 1 July	Helsinki Women's Match	Helsinki	Finland	
8–13 August	Lysekil Women's Match	Lysekil	Sweden	
20–25 September	Women's Match Racing World Championship	Sheboygan	United States	
24–29 October	Busan Cup Women's International Match Race	Busan	South Korea	
1–4 December	Carlos Aguilar Match Race	Saint Thomas	United States Virgin Islands	

== Standings ==
Pos	Skipper	Country	HWM	LWM	WC	BC	CAMR	Tot
Gold medal	Anna Östling	Sweden	25	25	25	18	20	95
Silver medal	Stephanie Roble	United States	–	22	18	14	22	76
Bronze medal	Renée Groeneveld	Netherlands	20	–	20	8	25	73
4	Camilla Ulrikkeholm Klinkby	Denmark	18	20	–	16	14	68
5	Caroline Sylvan	Sweden	16	16	16	10	18	66
6	Pauline Courtois	France	22	14	12	12	12	60
7	Nicole Breault	United States	–	–	10	–	16	26
8	Katie Spithill	Australia	–	–	–	25	–	25
9	Lucy MacGregor	Great Britain	–	–	–	22	–	22
10	Anne-Claire Le Berre	France	–	–	22	–	–	22
11	Marinella Laaksonen	Finland	14	7	–	–	–	21
12	Clare Leroy	France	–	–	–	20	–	20
13	Antonia Degerlund	Finland	10	–	–	–	10	20
14	Lotte Meldgaard Pedersen	Denmark	–	18	–	–	–	18
15	Johanna Bergqvist	Sweden	–	10	–	–	8	18
16	Samantha Norman	New Zealand	–	–	14	–	–	14
17	Sanna Häger	Sweden	6	8	–	–	–	14
18	Diana Kissane	Ireland	7	–	–	7	–	14
19	Alexa Bezel	Switzerland	–	12	–	–	–	12
20	Rikst Dijkstra	Netherlands	12	–	–	–	–	12
21	Elizabeth Shaw	Canada	–	–	8	–	–	8
22	Susanna Kukkonen	Finland	8	–	–	–	–	8
23	Morgan Collins	United States	–	–	–	–	7	7
24	Linnéa Floser	Sweden	–	–	–	–	6	6
25	Milly Bennett	Australia	–	–	–	6	–	6
26	Sandy Hayes	United States	–	–	–	–	5	5
27	Gyeong Jin Lee	South Korea	–	–	–	5	–	5
28	Sanna Mattsson	Sweden	5	–	–	–	–	5

Source: www.wimseries.com/results/
