= 2013 Women's International Match Racing Series =

Event title
- Edition: 1st
- Dates: 15 May – 10 August

Results
- Winner: (United Kingdom) Lucy MacGregor

The 2013 Women's International Match Racing Series was a series of match racing sailing regattas staged during 2013 season.

== Regattas ==
2013 regattas

Date	Regatta	City	Country	Equipment
15–19 May	Saint Quay Women's Match Racing	Saint-Quay-Portrieux	France	
6–9 June	2013 ISAF Women's Match Racing World Championship	Busan	South Korea	
19–23 June	Danish Open Ladies Cup	Copenhagen	Denmark	
11–14 July	New York Women's Invitational	Oyster Bay	United States	
5–10 August	Lysekil Women's Match	Lysekil	Sweden	

== Standings ==
Pos	Skipper	Country	SQ	WC	DO	NY	LWM	Tot
Gold medal	Lucy MacGregor	Great Britain	25	–	19	22	22	88
Silver medal	Anna Kjellberg	Sweden	12	13	11	25	20	70
Bronze medal	Camilla Ulrikkeholm	Denmark	–	22	22	–	25	69
4	Stephanie Roble	United States	20	–	13	14	–	47
5	Lotte Meldgaard	Denmark	–	–	25	19	–	44
6	Caroline Sylvan	Sweden	14	–	–	12	12	38
7	Claudia Pierce	New Zealand	10	7	–	8	6	31
8	Yekaterina Skudina	Russia	–	15	–	–	15	30
9	Támara Echegoyen	Spain	–	25	–	–	–	25
10	Klaartje Zuiderbaan	Netherlands	16	–	9	–	–	25
11	Alexa Bezel	Switzerland	6	11	–	–	8	25
12	Julie Bossard	France	22	–	–	–	–	22
13	Katie Spithill	Australia	–	19	–	–	–	19
14	Claire Leroy	France	–	–	–	–	16	16
15	Merel Witteveen	Netherlands	–	–	15	–	–	15
16	Ann-Claire Le Berre	France	–	–	–	–	13	13
17	Anna Kjellgren	Sweden	–	–	7	–	4	11
18	Johanna Larsson	Sweden	–	–	–	–	10	10
19	Nicole Breault	United States	–	–	–	10	–	10
20	Susannah Pyatt	New Zealand	–	9	–	–	–	9
21	Milly Bennett	Australia	8	–	–	–	–	8
22	Madeline Gill	United States	–	–	–	6	–	6
23	Anne Marit Hansen	Norway	–	–	4	–	–	4
24	Choi Sung-eun	South Korea	–	4	–	–	–	4
25	Morgane Dréau	France	4	–	–	–	–	4

Source: www.wimseries.com/results/
