= 2014 Women's International Match Racing Series =

Event title
- Edition: 2nd
- Dates: 3 June – 16 October

Results
- Winner: (Denmark) Camilla Ulrikkeholm

The 2014 Women's International Match Racing Series was a series of match racing sailing regattas staged during 2014 season.

== Regattas ==
2014 regattas

| Date | Regatta | City | Country | Equipment |
|---|---|---|---|---|
| 3–8 June | ISAF Women's Match Racing World Championship | Cork | Ireland | |
| 23–27 July | Women's Match Race Golfe du Morbihan | Vannes | France | |
| 4–9 August | Lysekil Women's Match | Lysekil | Sweden | |
| 23–28 September | Buddy Melges Challenge | Sheboygan | United States | |
| 11–16 October | Busan Cup Women's International Match Race | Busan | South Korea | |

== Standings ==
| Pos | Skipper | Country | WC | GdM | LWM | BMC | BC | Tot |
|---|---|---|---|---|---|---|---|---|
| Gold medal | Camilla Ulrikkeholm | Denmark | 22 | 25 | 25 | – | 16 | 88 |
| Silver medal | Anna Kjellberg | Sweden | 25 | 16 | 22 | 10 | 20 | 83 |
| Bronze medal | AnneClaire Le Berre | France | 15 | 20 | 11 | 19 | 15 | 69 |
| 4 | Stephanie Roble | United States | 20 | – | 13 | 22 | 13 | 68 |
| 5 | Caroline Sylvan | Sweden | 16 | 13 | 15 | 14 | 14 | 59 |
| 6 | Lotte Meldgaard Pedersen | Denmark | 13 | – | 19 | 25 | – | 57 |
| 7 | Klaartje Zuiderbaan | Netherlands | 14 | 22 | 9 | – | – | 45 |
| 8 | Claudia Pierce | New Zealand | 12 | 12 | 4 | – | 8 | 36 |
| 9 | Lucy MacGregor | Great Britain | – | – | – | – | 25 | 25 |
| 10 | Annabel Vose | Great Britain | 10 | 15 | – | – | – | 25 |
| 11 | Katie Spithill | Australia | – | – | – | – | 22 | 22 |
| 12 | Morgane Fountaine | France | – | 14 | – | – | – | 14 |
| 13 | Denise Lim | Singapore | – | – | – | – | 12 | 12 |
| 14 | Juliana Senfft | Brazil | – | – | – | 12 | – | 12 |
| 15 | Lucie Scheiwiller | France | 4 | 8 | – | – | – | 12 |
| 16 | Susannah Pyatt | New Zealand | – | – | – | – | 10 | 10 |
| 17 | Pauline Courtois | France | – | 10 | – | – | – | 10 |
| 18 | Madeline Gill | United States | – | – | – | 8 | – | 8 |
| 19 | Mary O'Loughlin | Ireland | 8 | – | – | – | – | 8 |
| 20 | Linda Rahm | Sweden | – | – | 7 | – | – | 7 |
| 21 | Urara Fujii | Japan | – | – | – | – | 6 | 6 |
| 22 | Rajaa Al Owaisi | Oman | – | 6 | – | – | – | 6 |
| 23 | Laura Dillon | Ireland | 6 | – | – | – | – | 6 |
| 24 | Sung Eun Choi | South Korea | – | – | – | – | 4 | 4 |
| 25 | Anastasia Guseva | Russia | – | 4 | – | – | – | 4 |
| 26 | AnneChristianne Kentgens | Netherlands | 0 | – | – | – | – | 0 |

Source: www.wimseries.com/results/
