= 2015 Women's International Match Racing Series =

Event title
- Edition: 3rd
- Dates: 8 July – 1 November

Results
- Winner: (United States) Stephanie Roble

The 2015 Women's International Match Racing Series was a series of match racing sailing regattas staged during 2015 season.

== Regattas ==
2015 regattas

Date	Regatta	City	Country	Equipment
8–12 July	ISAF Women's Match Racing World Championship	Middelfart	Denmark	
3–8 August	Lysekil Women's Match	Lysekil	Sweden	
16–20 September	Buddy Melges Challenge	Sheboygan	United States	
27 October – 1 November	Busan Cup Women's International Match Race	Busan	South Korea	

== Standings ==
Pos	Skipper	Country	I	LWM	BMC	BC	Tot
Gold medal	Stephanie Roble	United States	20	22	25	15	82
Silver medal	Camilla Ulrikkeholm Klinkby	Denmark	22	25	13	20	80
Bronze medal	Anne-Claire Le Berre	France	16	15	22	25	78
4	Anna Östling	Sweden	15	20	20	13	68
5	Caroline Sylvan	Sweden	13	16	12	14	55
6	Pauline Courtois	France	8	12	10	10	40
7	Katie Spithill	New Zealand	14	–	–	22	36
8	Renée Groeneveld	Netherlands	–	–	16	16	32
9	Klaartje Zuiderbaan	Netherlands	12	14	–	–	26
10	Lotte Meldgaard	Denmark	25	–	–	–	25
11	Juliana Senfft	Brazil	–	6	15	–	21
12	Milly Bennett	Australia	10	–	–	8	18
13	Diana Kissane	Ireland	4	–	8	6	18
14	Johanna Bergqvist	Sweden	–	8	6	–	14
15	Alexa Bezel	Switzerland	–	13	–	–	13
16	Denise Lim	Singapore	–	–	–	12	12
17	Annabel Vose	Great Britain	–	10	–	–	10
18	Louise Christensen	Denmark	6	–	–	–	6
19	Sung Eun Choi	South Korea	–	–	–	4	4
20	Morgan Wilson	United States	–	–	4	–	4
21	Sanna Häger	Sweden	0	4	–	–	4
22	Rikst Dijkstra	Netherlands	0	–	–	–	0
23	Johanna Larsson	Sweden	0	–	–	–	0
24	Nina Ramm-Schmidt	Finland	0	–	–	–	0

Source: www.wimseries.com/results/
