= List of J/22 championships =

This is a list of J/22 sailboat championships.

== International Women's Keelboat Championship ==
Year	Location	Entries	Winning boat	Country	Skipper
2011	Rochester, New York, United States			USA	Cory Sertl
2010				FRA	Claire Leroy
2009	Rochester, New York, United States			FRA	Claire Leroy
2008				USA	Sally Barkow
2007	La Porte, Texas, United States			USA	Sally Barkow
2006				NZL	Katie Spithill
2005				SWE	Marie Bjorling
2004				USA	Sally Barkow
2003				USA	Elizabeth Baylis
2002				SWE	Marie Bjorling
2001				USA	Cory Sertl
2000				USA	Betsy Alison
1999				USA	Dawn Riley
1998				BMU	Paula Lewin
1997				USA	Betsy Alison
1996				USA	Melissa Purdy
1995				USA	Jody Swanson
1994				CAN	Karen Johnson
1993				USA	Julia Trotman
1992				USA	Dawn Riley
1991				USA	J. J. Isler
