= Stena Match Cup Sweden =

Sailing competition in Sweden

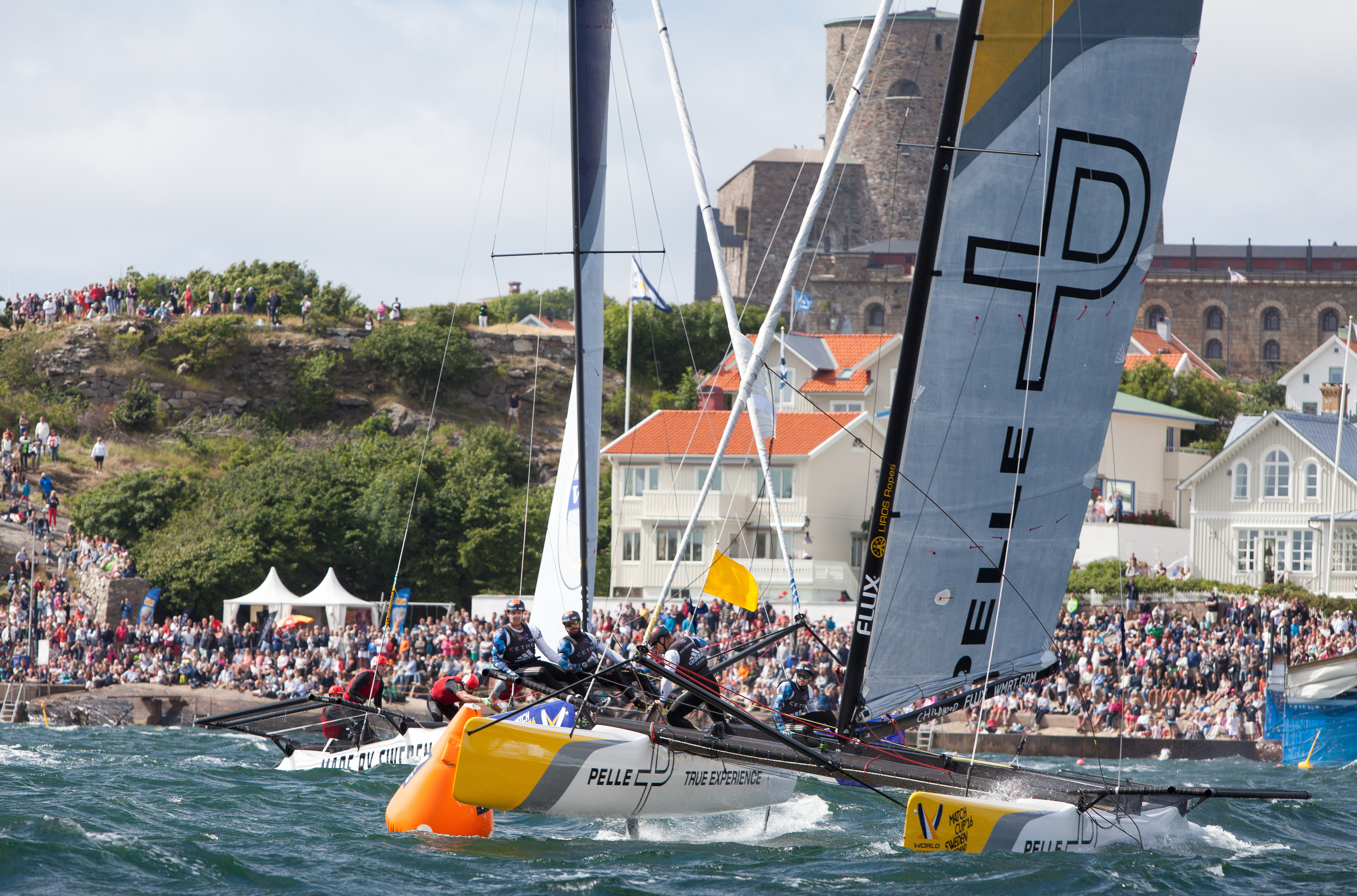
- Finals in Match Cup Sweden 2016 between Phil Robertson (NZL) och Taylor Canfield (USA).
- Organizer: Royal Gothenburg Yacht Club; Brandspot
- Type: match racing final on the World Match Racing Tour
- Classes: M32
- Venue: Marstrand, Sweden
- Competitors: 20
- Champion: Björn Hansen
- Most titles: Peter Gilmour (6)
- Website: www.matchcupsweden.com

Match Cup Sweden (previously Swedish Match Cup, Stena Match Cup Sweden) is a sailing event on the World Match Racing Tour held in Marstrand, Sweden in the beginning of July every year. Organizers of Match Cup Sweden are The Royal Gothenburg Yacht Club and Brandspot.

The tournament consists of an open class and a women's class, both of which compete in match race sailing. It is one of the pivotal events on the World Match Racing Tour, being among the longest running events on the tour. The event has attracted well over 100.000 spectators on an annual basis.

== History ==
The first edition of Match Cup Sweden was held in 1994, then as Swedish Match Cup. The initiator of the event was Swedish sailing legend Magnus Holmberg, who with the help from The Royal Gothenburg Yacht Club and Swedish Match arranged the first event in Marstrand, Sweden.

Between 1994 and 2002 the tournament used the DS 37 Matchracer boat, until the introduction of the Swedish Match 40 in 2003. The new boat was designed by another sailing legend, Pelle Petterson, specifically for the Swedish Match Tour, which was the equivalent of today's World Match Racing Tour.

Due to a change of the Swedish legislation prior to the 2006 event, Swedish Match, being a tobacco company, were prohibited of sponsoring the event. Losing its title sponsor, the 2006 event had to be cancelled, only to return in 2007 under the new name ’’’Match Cup Sweden’’’. The organizers then decided to go back to the original DS 37 Matchracer boats.

=== Hall of Fame ===
For the 15th edition of Match Cup Sweden in 2009, the organizers set up a Hall of Fame. Two inductees were elected for the opening of the Hall of Fame; Magnus Holmberg and Peter Gilmour.

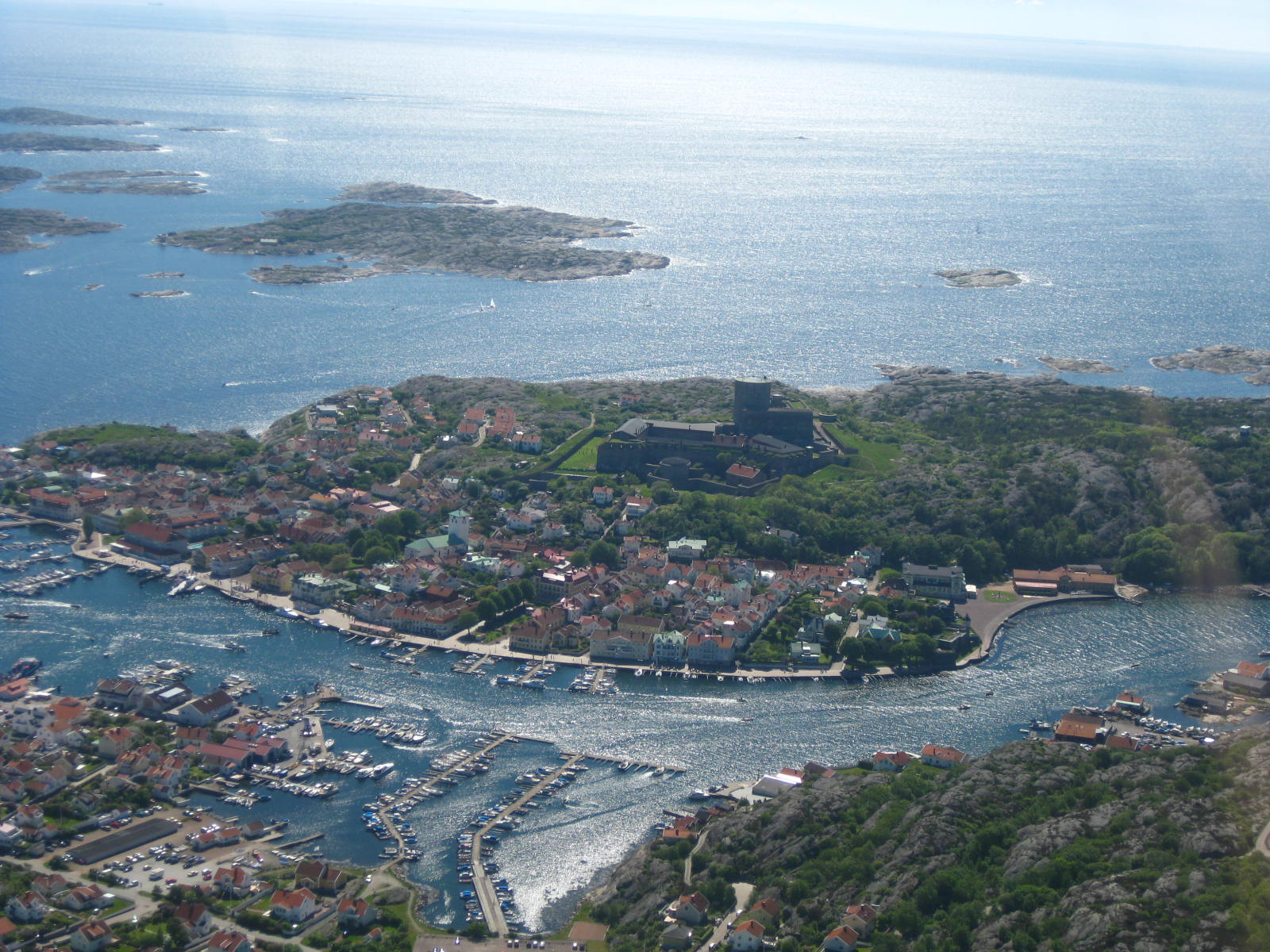
Marstrand seen from the East

== Results ==
=== Open class ===
Year	Champion	Runner-up	Third place	Fourth place
1994	(Australia) Peter Gilmour	(United States) Ed Baird	(Sweden) Magnus Holmberg	(New Zealand) Russell Coutts
1995	(Australia) Peter Gilmour	(United States) Ed Baird	(France) Bertrand Pacé	(Sweden) Magnus Holmberg
1996	(France) Bertrand Pacé	(New Zealand) Russell Coutts	(Australia) Peter Gilmour	(United States) Ed Baird
1997	(Australia) Peter Gilmour	(United States) Ed Baird	(Denmark) Jesper Bank	(Sweden) Magnus Holmberg
1998	(Japan) Peter Gilmour (Note: under Japanese nationality.)	(Denmark) Sten Mohr	(New Zealand) Dean Barker	(France) Bertrand Pacé
1999	(Japan) Peter Gilmour	(United States) Ed Baird	(Croatia) Tomislav Basic	(Sweden) Magnus Holmberg
2000	(New Zealand) Dean Barker	(France) Bertrand Pacé	(Denmark) Sten Mohr	(Sweden) Magnus Holmberg
2001	(Switzerland) Russell Coutts (Note: under Swiss nationality.)	(France) Luc Pillot	(Sweden) Magnus Holmberg	(Sweden) Björn Hansen
2002	(New Zealand) Dean Barker	(Switzerland) Russell Coutts	(United States) Ed Baird	(New Zealand) Bertrand Pacé
2003	(United Kingdom) Chris Law	(Poland) Karol Jabłoński	(United States Virgin Islands) Peter Holmberg	(Denmark) Jesper Bank
2004	(New Zealand) Russell Coutts	(Australia) Peter Gilmour	(Sweden) Magnus Holmberg	(United Kingdom) Chris Law
2005	(Australia) Peter Gilmour	(Sweden) Magnus Holmberg	(New Zealand) Dean Barker	(United States Virgin Islands) Peter Holmberg
2006	no races			
2007	(Sweden) Björn Hansen	(Sweden) Magnus Holmberg	(Denmark) Jesper Radich	(Sweden) Mattias Rahm
2008	(Sweden) Mattias Rahm	(Australia) Torvar Mirsky	(Sweden) Magnus Holmberg	(France) Mathieu Richard
2009	(Australia) Peter Gilmour	(France) Mathieu Richard	(France) Sebastien Col	(France) Damien Iehl
2010	(United Kingdom) Ben Ainslie	(Denmark) Jesper Radich	(Sweden) Magnus Holmberg	(Australia) Torvar Mirsky
2011	(United Kingdom) Ian Williams	(Sweden) Björn Hansen	(Denmark) Jesper Radich	(Australia) Peter Gilmour
2012	(Sweden) Björn Hansen	(Australia) Peter Gilmour	(United Kingdom) Ian Williams	(United Kingdom) Phil Robertson
2013	(Sweden) Björn Hansen	(United Kingdom) Phil Robertson	(Italy) Simone Ferrarese	(Australia) Keith Swinton
2014	(Sweden) Björn Hansen	(United Kingdom) Ian Williams	(United States Virgin Islands) Taylor Canfield	(Italy) Francesco Bruni
2015	(Sweden) Björn Hansen	(United Kingdom) Ian Williams	(Australia) Keith Swinton	(United States Virgin Islands) Taylor Canfield

=== Women’s class ===
Year	Champion	Runner-up	Third place	Fourth place
1999	(Denmark) Dorte O. Jensen	(France) Christine Briand	(United States) Betsy Alison	(Sweden) Marie Björling
2000	(Denmark) Dorte O. Jensen	(United States) Betsy Alison	(Sweden) Malin Källström	(Sweden) Marie Björling
2001	(Denmark) Dorte O. Jensen	(Sweden) Malin Källström	(Sweden) Malin Millbourn	(New Zealand) Sharon Ferris
2002	(Sweden) Marie Björling	(Denmark) Dorte O. Jensen	(Sweden) Malin Millbourn	(United States) Betsy Alison
2003	(Sweden) Marie Björling	(Sweden) Malin Källström	(Denmark) Annette Ström	(Sweden) Malin Millbourn
2004	(Sweden) Marie Björling	(Denmark) Lotte Meldgaard Pedersen	(France) Claire Leroy	(United States) Betsy Alison
2005	(Sweden) Malin Millbourn	(Sweden) Marie Björling	(France) Claire Leroy	(Sweden) Linda Rahm
2006	no races			
2007	no women's class			
2008	(France) Claire Leroy	(Sweden) Anna Kjellberg	(Sweden) Linda Rahm	(Sweden) Jenny Axhede
2009	(Australia) Katie Spithill	(Sweden) Anna Kjellberg	(Sweden) Linda Rahm	(United Kingdom) Lucy MacGregor
2010	(Russia) Ekaterina Skudina	(Netherlands) Renee Groeneveld	(United Kingdom) Lucy MacGregor	(Australia) Katie Spithill
2011	(France) Claire Leroy			
2012	no women's class			
2013	(United States) Stephanie Roble			
2014	no women's class			
2015	no women's class			
