= 2017 Women's International Match Racing Series =

Event title
- Edition: 5th
- Dates: 17 June – 16 December

Results
- Winner: (France) Pauline Courtois

The 2017 Women's International Match Racing Series was a series of match racing sailing regattas staged during 2017 season.

== Regattas ==
2017 regattas

| Date | Regatta | City | Country | Equipment |
|---|---|---|---|---|
| 16–21 June | Women's Match Racing World Championship | Helsinki | Finland | |
| 7–12 August | Lysekil Women's Match | Lysekil | Sweden | |
| 13–18 November | Busan Cup Women's International Match Race | Busan | South Korea | |
| 30 November – 3 December | Carlos Aguilar Match Race (cancelled) | Saint Thomas | United States Virgin Islands | |
| 11–16 December | International Bedanne's Cup | Tourville-la-Rivière | France | |

== Standings ==
| Pos | Skipper | Country | WC | LWM | BC | IBC | Tot |
|---|---|---|---|---|---|---|---|
| Gold medal | Pauline Courtois | France | 12 | 22 | 18 | 25 | 65 |
| Silver medal | Renée Groeneveld | Netherlands | 22 | 25 | 14 | – | 61 |
| Bronze medal | Trine Palludan | Denmark | 20 | 18 | 22 | – | 60 |
| 4 | Anna Östling | Sweden | 18 | 20 | 20 | – | 58 |
| 5 | Lucy MacGregor | Great Britain | 25 | – | 25 | – | 50 |
| 6 | Caroline Sylvan | Sweden | 10 | 16 | 16 | – | 42 |
| 7 | Marinella Laaksonen | Finland | 16 | 10 | 12 | 14 | 42 |
| 8 | Linnéa Floser | Sweden | – | 8 | 6 | 12 | 26 |
| 9 | Margot Riou | France | 7 | – | – | 16 | 23 |
| 10 | Anne-Claire Le Berre | France | – | – | – | 22 | 22 |
| 11 | Alexa Bezel | Switzerland | – | 14 | 7 | – | 21 |
| 12 | Margot Vennin | France | – | – | – | 20 | 20 |
| 13 | Johanna Bergqvist | Sweden | 8 | 12 | – | – | 20 |
| 14 | Allie Belcher | United States | – | – | – | 18 | 18 |
| 15 | Mikaela Fors | Finland | 14 | – | – | – | 14 |
| 16 | Ekaterina Kochkina | Russia | 3 | – | – | 10 | 13 |
| 17 | Antonia Degerlund | Finland | 5 | 6 | – | – | 11 |
| 18 | Sarah Parker | Australia | – | – | 10 | – | 10 |
| 19 | Sanna Mattsson | Sweden | – | – | – | 8 | 8 |
| 20 | Clare Costanzo | Australia | – | – | 8 | – | 8 |
| 21 | Octavia Owen | Great Britain | – | 7 | – | – | 7 |
| 22 | Martina Karlemo | Finland | 6 | – | – | – | 6 |
| 23 | Eunjin Kim | South Korea | – | – | 5 | – | 5 |
| 24 | Sanna Häger | Sweden | 4 | – | – | – | 4 |

Source: www.wimseries.com/results/
