= Women's Match Racing World Championship =

The Women's Match Racing World Championship is a sailing match race organized by the host club in partnership with World Sailing.

== History ==
The first ISAF Women's Match Racing World Championship was held in 1999 in Genoa, Italy after having been held at the 1998 ISAF World Sailing Games in Dubai, United Arab Emirates.

The 2012 Summer Olympics included women's match racing in the Elliott 6m for this reason the normally limited entry in the world championship was dramatically increased for 2009 to 2012.

== Editions ==
Edition			Location			Equipment		Participation			Ref
No.	Dates	Year	Club	City	Country	Class	Crew	Teams	Sailors	Nations	Ref
1	24–31 October	1999	Yacht Club Italiano	Genoa	Italy	J/22		23		14+	
2	25 November – 2 December	2000	St. Petersburg Yacht Club	St. Petersburg, Florida	United States	Sonar (keelboat)		24		17+	
3	2–9 September	2001	Associazione Vela Lago di Ledro a.s.d.	Lago di Ledro	Italy	J/22		17			
4	28 April – 4 May	2002	Club Nautico De Calpe	Calpe	Spain	J/22		16			
5	17–22 June	2003	Sundsvall Yacht Club	Sundsvall	Sweden	J/80		12			
6	5–12 June	2004	Eastport Yacht Club	Annapolis	United States	J/22					
7	15–18 October	2005	Hamilton Harbour, Bermuda	Hamilton	Bermuda	J/24		12			
8	24–28 May	2006		Copenhagen	Denmark	DS 37					
9	6–11 August	2007	Sport Nautique de Saint Quay–Portrieux	Saint-Quay-Portrieux	France	Beneteau; First Class 8					
10	1–6 April	2008	Royal New Zealand Yacht Squadron	Auckland	New Zealand	Elliott 6m	3	14	56	9	
11	27 July – 1 August	2009	Lysekil Yacht Club Gullmar	Lysekil	Sweden	DS37	6	12	72	7	
12	20–25 September	2010	New York Yacht Club, Newport	Newport	United States	Sonar (keelboat)	4	20	80	14	
13	3–18 December	2011	Royal Perth Yacht Club	Perth	Australia	Elliott 6m	3	29	87	20	
14	24–30 June	2012	Royal Gothenburg Yacht Club (GKSS)	Gothenburg	Sweden	Elliott 6m	3	16	48	12	
15	4–9 June	2013		Busan	South Korea	K30 Class	5	9	45	10	
16	3–8 June	2014	Royal Cork Yacht Club	Cork	Ireland	J/80 (Sym)	4	13	53	9	
17	8–12 July	2015	Middelfart Sejlklub	Middelfart	Denmark	Match 28	5	16	81	9	
18	21–25 September	2016	Sail Sheboygan	Sheboygan	United States	Elliott 6m	3	9	27	6	
19	16–21 June	2017	Nyländska Jaktklubben (NJK)	Helsinki	Finland	J/80 (Sym)	5	14	70	7	
20	13–18 August	2018	Gubernskiy Yacht Club	Ekaterinburg	Russia	Ricochet 747	4	11	45	6	
21	5–10 August	2019	Lysekil Segel Saliskap Gullmar (LSSG)	Lysekil	Sweden	FarEast 28R	5				
N/A		2020	Royal New Zealand Yacht Squadron	Auckland	New Zealand	CANCELLED COVID					
N/A		2021	Royal New Zealand Yacht Squadron	Auckland	New Zealand	CANCELLED COVID					
22	28–31 October	2021	Yacht Club Cherbourg	Cherbourg	France	J/80 Asym.					
23	9–13 November	2022	Royal New Zealand Yacht Squadron	Auckland	New Zealand	Elliott 7m	5				
24	3–7 July	2023		Middelfart	Denmark	blu26		11			
25	3-8 Dec	2024	Jeddah Yacht Club & Marina	Jeddah	Saudi Arabia	FarEast 28R		9			
26	16-20 Sept	2025	Chicago Yacht Club	Chicago	United States	Tom 28	5	12	60	10	
27	Sept -Oct	2026	St. Francis Yacht Club	San Diego	United States	J/22	4	12	48		

== Medalists ==
Year	Gold	Silver	Bronze
1999	Dorte O. Jensen (DEN); UNKNOWN; UNKNOWN	Betsy Alison (USA); UNKNOWN; UNKNOWN	Corey Sertl (USA); UNKNOWN; UNKNOWN
2000	Dorte O. Jensen (DEN); UNKNOWN; UNKNOWN	Marie Björling (SWE); UNKNOWN; UNKNOWN	Betsy Alison (USA); UNKNOWN; UNKNOWN
2001	Dorte O. Jensen (DEN); UNKNOWN; UNKNOWN	Marie Björling (SWE); UNKNOWN; UNKNOWN	Lotte Meldgaard Pedersen (DEN); UNKNOWN; UNKNOWN
2002	Liz Baylis (USA); UNKNOWN; UNKNOWN	Marie Björling (SWE); UNKNOWN; UNKNOWN	Anne Lehelley (FRA); UNKNOWN; UNKNOWN
2003	Malin Millbourn (SWE); Kim Kulstad; Åsa Aronsson; Linda Yström	Lotte Meldgaard Pedersen (USA); UNKNOWN; UNKNOWN	Marie Björling (SWE); UNKNOWN; UNKNOWN
2004	Sally Barkow (USA); Annie Lush (GBR); UNKNOWN	Betsy Alison (USA); UNKNOWN; UNKNOWN	Claire Leroy (FRA); UNKNOWN; UNKNOWN
2005	Sally Barkow (USA); Deborah Capozzi (USA); Carolyn Howe (USA); Annie Lush (GBR)	Betsy Alison (USA); UNKNOWN; UNKNOWN	Claire Leroy (FRA); UNKNOWN; UNKNOWN
2006	Denmark; Dorte O. Jensen; UNKNOWN; UNKNOWN	Sweden; Marie Björling|USA}} UNKNOWN; UNKNOWN	Sweden; Lotta Rahm|USA}} UNKNOWN; UNKNOWN
2007	France; Claire Leroy; UNKNOWN; UNKNOWN	Australia; Katie Spithill|USA}} UNKNOWN; UNKNOWN	Denmark; Lotte Meldgaard Pedersen|USA}} UNKNOWN; UNKNOWN
2008	Claire Leroy (FRA); Marie Riou (FRA); Elodie Bertrand (FRA); Claire Pruvot (FRA)	Elizabeth Baylis (USA); Susanne Leech (USA); Lee Icyda (USA); Karina Shelton (USA)	Silja Lehtinen (FIN); Vivi Fleming Lehtinen (FIN); Maria Klemetz (FIN); Livia Väresmaa (FIN)
2009	Nicky Souter (AUS); Lucinda Whitty (AUS); Nina Curtis (AUS); Ray Martin (AUS); Kat Stroinovsky (AUS); Amanda Scrivenor (AUS)	Marie Bjorling (SWE); Anna Holmdahl White (SWE); Jenny Axhede (SWE); Elisabeth Nilsson (SWE); Elin Åderman (SWE); Annika Carlunger (SWE)	Anna Kjellberg (SWE); Malin Kjällström (SWE); Nina Barne (SWE); Vanja Lundberg (SWE); Madde Magnusson (SWE); LoJa Harrysson (SWE)
2010	Lucy MacGregor (GBR); Annie Lush (GBR); Kate MacGregor (GBR); Mary Rook (GBR)	Sally Barkow (USA); Elizabeth Kratzig (USA); Alana O’Reilly (USA); Susanne Leech (USA)	Nicky Souter (AUS); Nina Curtis (AUS); Olivia Price (AUS); Laura Baldwin (GBR)
2011	Anna Tunnicliffe (USA); Molly Vandemoer (USA); Debbie Capozzi (USA)	Lucy MacGregor (GBR); Annie Lush (GBR); Kate MacGregor (GBR)	France; Claire Leroy; Élodie Bertrand; Marie Riou
2012	Finland; Silja Lehtinen; Silja Kanerva; Mikaela Wulff	United States; Anna Tunnicliffe; Deborah Capozzi; Molly Vandemoer	United States; Sally Barkow; Elizabeth Kratzig-Burnham; Alana O'Reilly
2013	Tamara Echegoyen (ESP); Sofia Toro (ESP); Eva Gonzalez (ESP); Mariana Lobato (POR); Lara Cacabelos (ESP)	Camilla Ulrikkeholm (DEN); Trine Palludan (DEN); Louise Ulrikkeholm (DEN); Josefine Boel Rasmussen (DEN); Joan Vestergård Hansen (DEN)	Katie Spithill (AUS); Alessandra Angelini (ITA); Jessica Eastwell (AUS); Maryann Thomas (AUS) Stacey Jackson (AUS)
2014	Anna Kjellberg (SWE); Karin Almquist (SWE); Vanja Lundberg (SWE); Annika Carlunger (SWE)	Denmark; Camilla Ulrikkeholm; Trine Palludan; Louise Ulrikkeholm; Joan Vestergård Hansen	United States; Stephanie Roble; Janel Zarkowsky; Maggie Shea; Lara Dallman-Weiss
2015	Lotte Meldgaard Pedersen (DEN); Anne Sofie Munk-Hansen (DEN); Josephine Nissen (DEN); Tina Gramkov (DEN); Nina Grunow (GER)	Camilla Ulrikkeholm (DEN); Trine Palludan (DEN); Louise Ulrikkeholm Bredvig (DEN); Josefine Boel Rasmussen (DEN); Joan Vestergård Hansen (DEN)	Stephanie Roble (USA); Megan Six (USA); Jamie Haines (USA); Elizabeth Shaw (CAN); Janel Zarkowsky (USA)
2016	Lotte Meldgaard Pedersen (DEN); Anne Sofie Munk-Hansen (DEN); Josephine Nissen (DEN); Tina Gramkov (DEN); Nina Grunow (GER)	Camilla Ulrikkeholm (DEN); Trine Palludan (DEN); Louise Ulrikkeholm Bredvig (DEN); Josefine Boel Rasmussen (DEN); Joan Vestergård Hansen (DEN)	Renee Groeneveld (NED); Lobke Berkhout (NED); Mijke Lievens (NED)
2017	Lucy MacGregor (GBR); Silja Frost (FIN); Rosie Watkins (GBR); Imogen Stanley (GBR); Charlotte Lawrence (GBR)	Netherlands; Renée Groeneveld; Marcelien Bos-de Koning; Lobke Berkhout; Sanne Akkerman; Mijke Lievens	Denmark; Trine Palludan; Lea Richter Vogelius; Vivi Lund Møller; Anne Sofie Munk-Hansen; Joan Vestergård Hansen
2018	Lucy MacGregor (GBR); Annie Lush (GBR); Nicky Walsh (GBR); Kate MacGregor (GBR)	France; Pauline Courtois; Maëlenn Lemaitre; Louise Acker; Sophie Faguet	Denmark; Trine Palludan; Anne Sofie Munk-Hansen; Louise Ulrikkeholm Bredvig; Joan Wester Hansen
2019	Lucy MacGregor (GBR); Amy Sparks (GBR); Bethan Carden (GBR); Mary Rook (GBR); Kate MacGregor (GBR)	Claire Leroy (FRA); Mathilde Geron (FRA); Julie Gerecht (FRA); Lola Billy (FRA); Sigrid Longeau (FRA)	Pauline Courtois (FRA); Maëlenn Lemaître (FRA); Louise Acker (FRA); Nathalie Corson (FRA); Sophie Faguet (FRA)
2020	COVID		
2021	France; Pauline Courtois; UNKNOWN; UNKNOWN	Netherlands; Renee Groeneveld	Sweden; Anna Östling
2022	Pauline Courtois (FRA); Maëlenn Lemaitre (FRA); Louise Acker (FRA); Thea Khelif (FRA); Clara BayoL (FRA)	Celia Willison (NZL); Charlotte Porter (NZL); Serena Woodall (NZL); Paige Cook (NZL); Alison Kent (NZL)	Megan Thomson (NZL); Ellie Copeland (NZL); Chelsea Rees (NZL); Josi Andres (NZL); Anna Merchant (NZL)
2023	Pauline Courtois (FRA); Maëlenn Lemaitre (FRA); Louise Acker (FRA); Thea Khelif (FRA); Clara Bayol (FRA)	Sweden; Anna Östling	Denmark; Lea Richter Vogelius
2024	Pauline Courtois (FRA); Maelenn Lemaitre (FRA); Louise Acker (FRA); Sophie Faguet (FRA); Laurane Mettraux (SUI)	Megan Thomson (NZL); Charlotte Porter (NZL) Josefin Andres (NZL); Anna Merchant (NZL); Tiana Wittey (AUS)	Anna Östling (SWE); Linnea Wennergren (SWE) Annie Wennergren (SWE); Annika Carlunger (SWE); Anna White Holmdal (SWE)
2025	Pauline Courtois (FRA); Maëlenn Lemaitre (FRA); Louise Acker (FRA); Sophie Faguet (FRA); Laurane Mettraux (SUI)	Megan Thomson (NZL); Tiana Wittey (AUS); Josi Andres (25x17px); Charlotte Porter (NZL); Hattie Rogers (GBR)	Lea Richter Vogelius (DEN); Joan Hansen (DEN); Annette Strøm (DEN); Anne Sofie Munk-Hansen (DEN); Josefine Boel Rasmussen (DEN)
2026	Pauline Courtois (FRA); Maëlenn Lemaitre (FRA); Louise Acker (FRA); Laurane Mettraux (SUI)	Nicole Breault (USA); Molly O'Bryan Vandemoer (USA); Hailey Thompson (USA); Molly Carapiet (USA)	Julia Aartsen (NED); Eva Asbeek Brusse (NED); Nerine Usman (NED); Ismene Usman (NED)

== 2011 ==
Perth, Australia
December
Boat Used – Elliott 6m – 3 Person Crew

Held as part of the 2011 ISAF Sailing World Championships results can be found on that page.

== 2010 ==
Newport RI, USA
Boats Used – Sonar (keelboat) – 4 Person

Pos.	Sailor	Crew
	Lucy MacGregor (GBR); Annie Lush (GBR); Kate MacGregor (GBR); Mary Rook (GBR)
	Sally Barkow (USA); Elizabeth Kratzig (USA); Alana O'Reilly (USA); Susanne Leech (USA)
	Nicky Souter AUS
4	Claire Leroy FRA
5
6
7
8
9
10
11
12

== 2009 ==
Lysekil, Sweden
27 July – 1 August

Pos.	Sailor	Crew
	Nicky Souter (AUS)
	Marie Bjorling (SWE)
	Anna Kjellberg (SWE)
4	Claire Leroy (FRA)
5	Katie Spithill (AUS)
6	Camilla Ulrikkeholm (DEN)
7	Sally Barkow (USA)
8	Lotte Meldgaard Pedersen (DEN)
9	Lucy Macgregor (GBR)
10	Linda Rahm (SWE)
11	Silke Hahlbrock (GER)
12	Christelle Philippe (FRA)

== 2008 ==
Auckland, New Zealand
1–6 April

Pos.	Sailor	Crew
	Claire Leroy (FRA)
	Liz Baylis (USA)
	Silja Lehtinen (FIN)
4	Josie Gibson (GBR)
5	Katie Spithill (AUS)
6	Silke Hahlbrock (GER)
7	Nicky Souter (AUS)
8	Jessica Smyth (NZL)
9	Christelle Philippe (FRA)
10	Lotte Meldgaard Pedersen (DEN)
11	Camilla Ulrikkeholm (DEN)
12	Sabrina Gurioli (ITA)
13	Jan Dawson (NZL)
14	Gemma Farrell (GBR)

== 2007 ==
St Quay, France
6–11 August

Pos.	Sailor	Crew
	Claire Leroy (FRA)
	Katie Spithill (AUS)
	Lotte Meldgaard Pedersen (DEN)
4	Josie Gibson (GBR)
5	Klaartje Zuiderbaan (NED)
6	Christelle Philippe (FRA)
7	Silke Hahlbrock (GER)
8	Jessica Smyth (NZL)
9	Jenny Axhede (SWE)
10	Nicky Souter (AUS)
11	Gemma Farrel (GBR)
12	Sandy Hayes (USA)

== 2006 ==
Copenhagen, Denmark
24–28 May

Pos.	Sailor	Crew
	Dorte O Jensen (DEN)
	Marie Björling (SWE)
	Linda Rahm (SWE)
4	Lotte Meldgaard Pedersen (DEN)
5	Klaartje Zuiderbaan (NED)
6	Malin Källström (SWE)
7	Sally Barkow (USA)
8	Claire Leroy (FRA)
9	Nina Braestrup (DEN)
10	Betsy Alison (USA)
11	Christelle Philippe (FRA)
12	Silke Hahlbrock (GER)

== 2005 ==
Hamilton, Bermuda
15–18 October

Pos.	Sailor	Crew
	Sally Barkow (USA)
	Betsy Alison (USA)
	Claire Leroy (FRA)
4	Nina Braestrup (DEN)
5	Marie Björling (SWE)
6	Nicky Souter (AUS)
7	Lotte Meldgaard Pedersen (DEN)
8	Paula Lewin (BER)
9	Klaartje Zuiderbaan (NED)
10	Jenny Axhede (SWE)
11	Linda Rahm (SWE)
12	Christelle Philippe (FRA)

== 2004 ==
Annapolis, USA
5–12 June

Pos.	Sailor	Crew
	Sally Barkow (USA)
	Betsy Alison (USA)
	Claire Leroy (FRA)
4	Paula Lewin (BER)
5	Lotte Meldgaard Pedersen (DEN)
6	Katie Spithill (AUS)
7	Liz Baylis (USA)
8	Elizabeth Kratzig (USA)
9	Jenny Axhede (SWE)
10	Carol Cronin (USA)
11	Deb Willits (USA)
12	Christelle Philippe (FRA)
13	Sabrina Gurioli (ITA)
14	Linda Rahm (SWE)
15	Nina Braestrup (DEN)
16	Marie Faure (FRA)

== 2003 ==
Sundsvall, Sweden
17–21 June

Pos.	Sailor	Crew
	Malin Millbourn (SWE)
	Lotte Meldgaard Pedersen (DEN)
	Marie Björling (SWE)
4	Liz Baylis (USA)
5	Betsy Alison (USA)
6	Nina Braestrup (DEN)
7	Marie Faure (FRA)
8	Gwen Joulie (FRA)
9	Deborah Willits (USA)
10	Sabrina Gurioli (ITA)
11	Linda Rahm (SWE)
12	Ines Montefusco (ITA)

== 2002 ==
Calpe, Spain 28 April – 2 May

Pos.	Sailor	Crew
	Liz Baylis (USA)
	Marie Björling (SWE)
	Anne Lehelley (FRA)
4	Cordelia Eglin (GBR)
5	Dawn Riley (USA)
6	Nina B. Petersen (DEN)
7	Sabrina Gurioli (ITA)
8	Lotte Meldgaard Pedersen (DEN)
9	Sandy Grosvenor (USA)
10	Giulia Conti (ITA)
11	Mar Castanedo (ESP)
12	Malin Millbourn (SWE)
13	Claire Leroy (FRA)
14	Ines Montefusco (ITA)
15	Gwen Joulie (FRA)
16	Christelle Philippe (FRA)

== 2001 ==
Lago di Ledro, Italy 2–9 September

Pos.	Sailor	Crew
	Dorte O Jensen (DEN)
	Marie Björling (SWE)
	Lotte Meldgaard Pedersen (DEN)
4	Katie Hill (AUS)
5	Giulia Conti (ITA)
6	Sabrina Gurioli (ITA)
7	Christine Briand (FRA)
8	Malin Kallstrom (SWE)
9	Mar Castanedo (ESP)
10	Maling Millbourn (SWE)
11	Nina B. Petersen (DEN)
12	Ines Montefusco (ITA)
13	Anne Lehelley (FRA)
14	Karen Johnson (CAN)
15	Courtney Lawrence (AUS)
16	Catharina Gylling (FIN)
17	Martina Karlemo (FIN)

== 2000 ==
St Petersburg, USA 25 November – 2 December

Pos.	Sailor	Crew
	Dorte O Jensen (DEN)
	Marie Björling (SWE)
	Betsy Alison (USA)
4	Shirley Robertson (GBR)
5	Klaartje Zuiderbaan (NED)
6	Hannah Swett (USA)
7	Katie Spithill (AUS)
8	Paula Lewin (BER)
9	Christine Briand (FRA)
10	Cristiana Monina (ITA)
11	Malin Millbourn (SWE)
12	Cordelia Eglin (GBR)
13	Carolijn Brouwer (NED)
14	Amy Waring (NZL)
15	Dru Slattery (USA)
16	Gwen Joulie (FRA)
17	Marie Klok (DEN)
18	Catharina Gylling (FIN)
19	Nadine Stegenwalner (GER)
20	Karen Johnson (CAN)
21	Maria Coleman (IRL)
22	Mar Castanedo (ESP)
23	Cristina Pereira (POR)
24	Catherine Ranke (NOR)

== 1999 ==
Genoa, Italy 28–31 October

Pos.	Sailor	Crew
	Dorte O Jensen (DEN)
	Betsy Alison (USA)
	Cory Sertl (USA)
4	Klaartje Zuiderbaan (NED)
5	Shirley Robertson (GBR)
6	Dru Slattery (USA)
7	Malin Millbourn (SWE)
8	Sharon Ferris (NZL)
9	Christine Briand (FRA)
10	Mar Castanedo (ESP)
10	Paula Lewin (BER)
10	Malin Kallström (SWE)
13	Kristine Roug (NED)
13	Marie Klok (DEN)
13	Jessie Cuthbert (GBR)
16	Susanne Madsen (DEN)
16	Nadine Stegenwalner (GER)
16	Cordelia Eglin (GBR)
19	Katie Spithill (AUS)
20	Altani Danezi (GRE)
21	Marie Björling (SWE)
22	Cristina Monina (ITA)
23	Cristina Pereira (POR)
