= Lysekil Women's Match =

- First held: 2004
- Type: match racing event on the Women's International Match Racing Series
- Classes: Fareast 28R
- Venue: Lysekil, Sweden
- Champion: Camilla Ulrikkeholm (2015)
- Most titles: Camilla Ulrikkeholm (5)
- Website: lysekilwomensmatch.se

Lysekil Women's Match is an annual match racing sailing competition and event on the World Match Racing Tour. It is sailed in Fareast 28R yachts (2019).

== Winners ==
Year	Champion	Runner-up	Third place	Fourth place
2004	(Sweden) Marie Björling	(France) Claire Leroy	(Denmark) Nina Braestrup	(Sweden) Linda Rahm
2005	cancelled			
2006	(Denmark) Lotte Meldgaard Pedersen	(France) Claire Leroy	(Sweden) Linda Rahm	(Sweden) Malin Millbourn
2007	(Sweden) Linda Rahm	(Sweden) Marie Björling	(Denmark) Lotte Meldgaard Pedersen	(Australia) Katie Sptihill
2008	(Sweden) Linda Rahm	(France) Claire Leroy	(Denmark) Lotte Meldgaard Pedersen	(United Kingdom) Lucy MacGregor
2009 (Note: served as ISAF Women's Match Racing World Championship)	(Australia) Nicole Souter	(Sweden) Marie Björling	(Sweden) Anna Kjellberg	(France) Claire Leroy
2010	cancelled			
2011	(Denmark) Camilla Ulrikkeholm	(Australia) Nicky Souter	(United States) Stephanie Roble	(Denmark) Trine Abrahamsen
2012	(Denmark) Camilla Ulrikkeholm	(Switzerland) Alexa Bezel	(Netherlands) Mandy Mulder	(Sweden) Marie Björling
2013	(Denmark) Camilla Ulrikkeholm	(United Kingdom) Lucy MacGregor	(Sweden) Anna Kjellberg	(France) Claire Leroy
2014	(Denmark) Camilla Ulrikkeholm	(Sweden) Anna Kjellberg	(Denmark) Lotte Meldgaard Pedersen	(Sweden) Caroline Sylvan
2015	(Denmark) Camilla Ulrikkeholm	(United States) Stephanie Roble	(Sweden) Anna Östling	(Sweden) Caroline Sylvan
2016	(Sweden) Anna Östling	(United States) Stephanie Roble	(Denmark) Camilla Ulrikkeholm	(Denmark) Lotte Meldgaard Pedersen
2017	(Netherlands) Renée Groeneveld	(France) Pauline Courtois	(Sweden) Anna Östling	(Denmark) Trine Palludan
2018	(France) Pauline Courtois	(Denmark) Henriette Koch	(Sweden) Anna Östling	(Sweden) Johanna Bergqvist
2019	(United Kingdom) Lucy MacGregor	(France) Claire Leroy	(France) Pauline Courtois	(Netherlands) Renée Groeneveld
