= Laura Baldwin =

Laura Baldwin may refer to:

- Laura Spencer (General Hospital), formerly Baldwin, a fictional character on the ABC soap opera General Hospital
- Laura Baldwin (sailor) (born 1980), British sailor
