= Waterford Harbour Sailing Club =

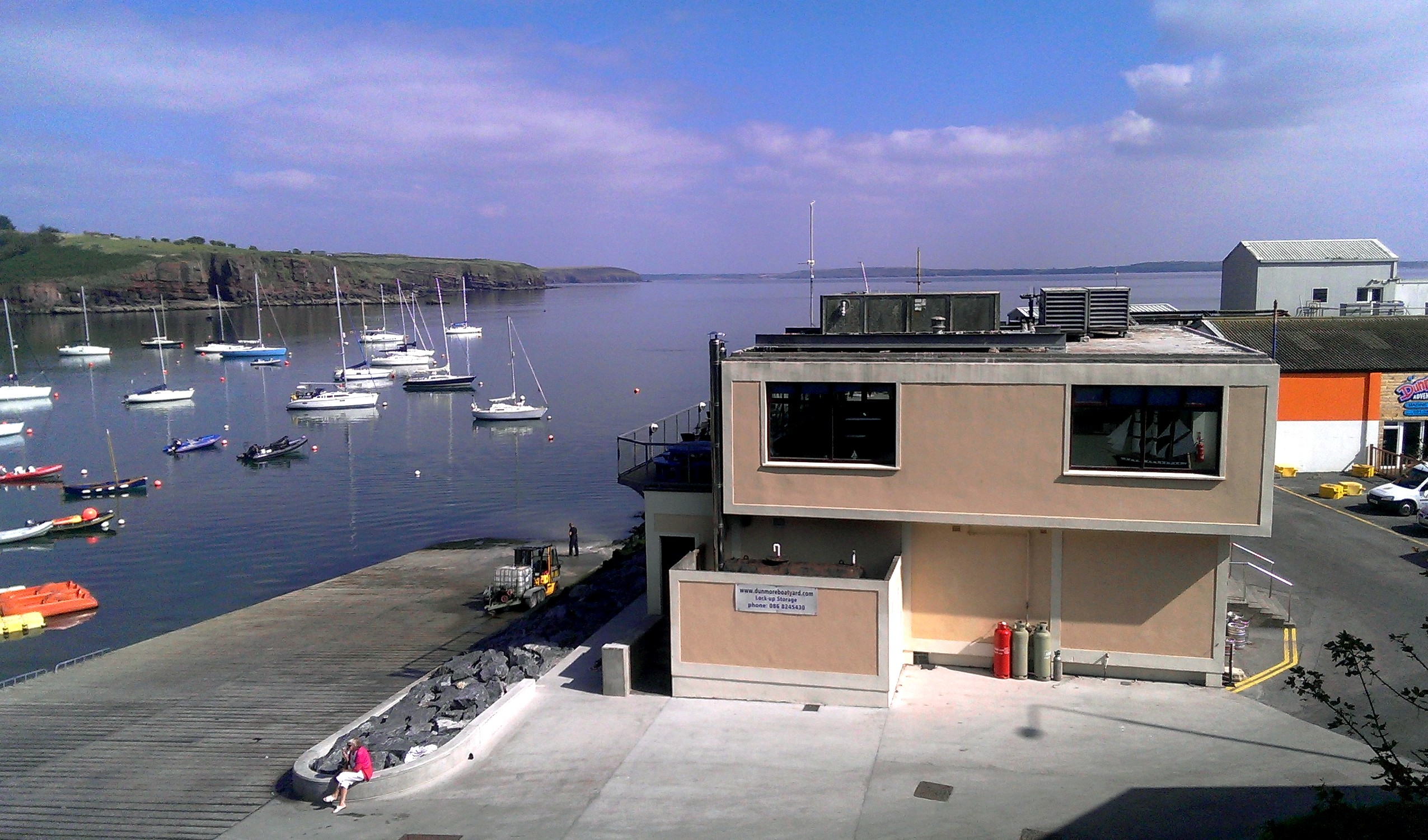
Waterford Harbour Sailing Club at Dunmore East

Waterford Harbour Sailing Club is situated in Dunmore East in the west side of Waterford Harbour. It is the largest sailing club in South East Ireland and has a membership of 400. The club was founded in 1934 at Dunmore East and occupies a location beside the slip in the harbour. The present clubhouse was built in 1969 and was extended in 1974. The club is affiliated to the Irish Sailing Association.

The club has been the venue for the Enterprise World Championships 1975 and the World Board Sailing Championships in 1988. In 2014 the club hosted the Topper National Championship and the Laser Leinster Championship.

== History ==
The club was founded in 1934 by a group of seven interested sailor/boat builders. Those present were: E. A. Gibbon in the Chair, P.A. Anderson, W. Anderson and R.T. Kelly. The first committee subsequently elected were: Major Lloyd, R.T. Kelly, P.A. Anderson, Sir Ernest Goff, Mr. Colfer, E.A. Gibbon. Proposed by R.T. Kelly, seconded by Sir Ernest Goff and passed unanimously. Sir Ernest Goff Proposed a subscription of 10/- for Boat Owners and other members 5/- This was seconded by Mr Kelly and passed unanimously. A vote of thanks was proposed to the Mayor.

In the early days R. Wall Morris is credited with being the first Commodore

In 2007, the club decided to buy a 1500 sq. ft. property adjacent to main building as a dinghy store and boathouse and to provide extra clubrooms. This premises also had parking frontage at the harbour and was seen as a potentially valuable asset in the event of the planned harbour development. This development subsequently took place and is in use all through the year by youth and adult members, as well as having meeting rooms for use by race officers and course instructors.

== Fleets ==
Currently? the most popular classes used by the club include: Optomist, Topper, Laser, 420, Flying Fifteen, Cruisers.

== Visiting yachts ==
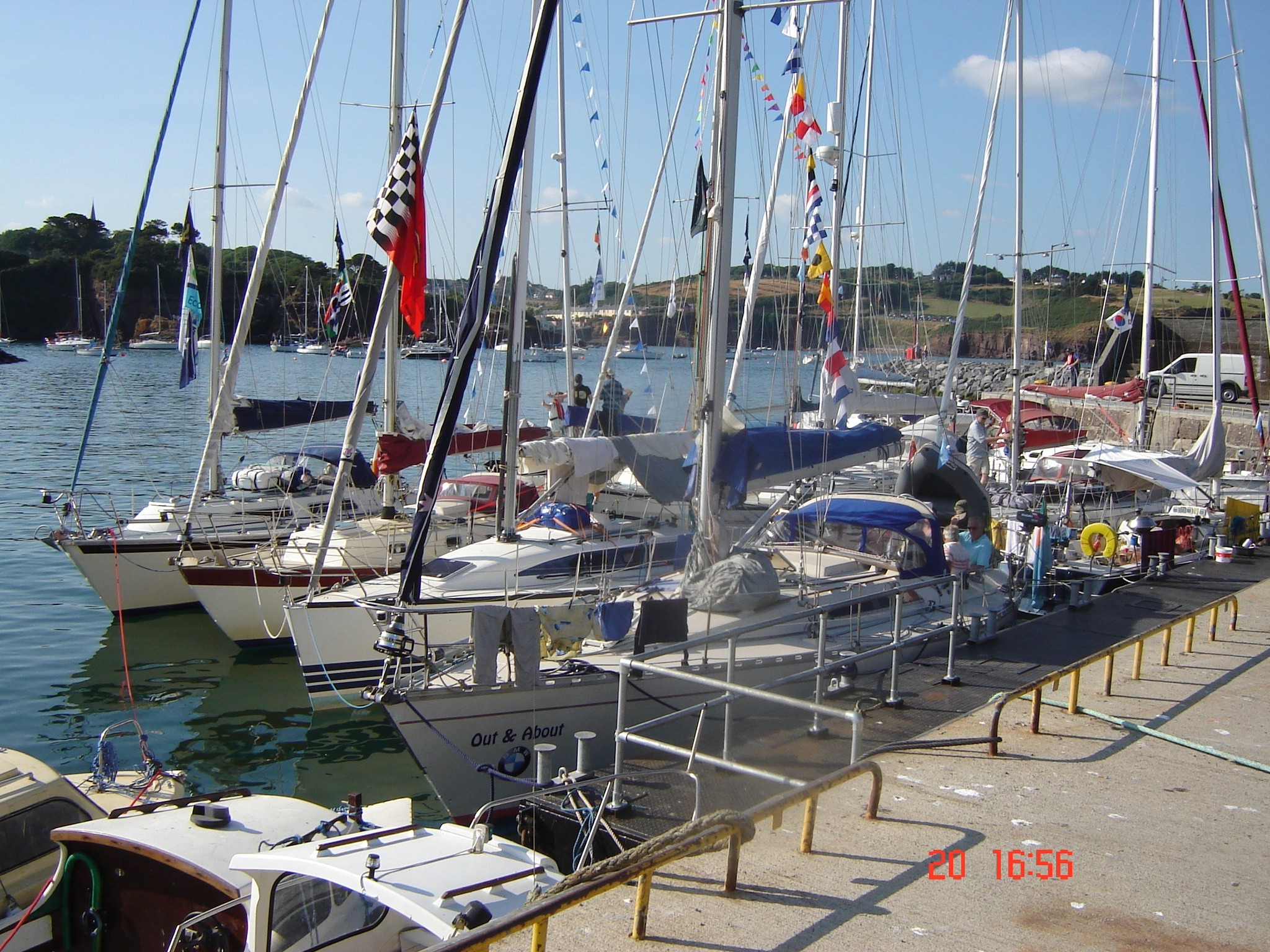
Visiting leisure craft on the visitors pontoon, Dunmore East

Prior to 2013, facilities for visiting yachts in the harbour were not good but a new pontoon was placed in the harbour by the Dept of the Marine for the use of visiting leisure craft. This is available for the months of June, July and August and the harbourmaster must be contacted to arrange overnight payment.

== See also ==
- Irish Sailing Association
