= 2023 Sailing World Championships – Women's Hansa 303 =

Women's Hansa 303 at the 2023 Sailing World Championships
- Venue: The Hague, the Netherlands
- Dates: 11–16 August
- Competitors: 11 from 11 nations

Medalists
gold medal	Betsy Alison	United States
silver medal	Olga Górnaś-Grudzień	Poland
bronze medal	Alison Weatherly	Australia

The women's Hansa 303 competition at the 2023 Sailing World Championships was the women's one-person non-technical para event and was held in The Hague, the Netherlands, 11–16 August 2023. The entries were limited to 30 boats. The competitors participated in a series that was planned to 10 races. The last race was planned for 16 August.

== Summary ==
Olga Górnaś-Grudzień of Poland had won the 2022 Para World Sailing Championships in Hiroshima before Miray Ulaş of Turkey.

Betsy Alison took the lead first day winning both races. On 16 August, going in to the final day, Alison had a one-point lead to Górnaś-Grudzień. Alison also won the gold medal, the first awarded in the championship, ahead of Górnaś-Grudzień, while Alison Weatherly of Australia won the bronze medal just ahead of Valia Galdi of Italy and Violeta del Reino of Spain. Betsy Alison entered the competition nine months after a hip operation making her para-classified.

== Results ==
Results of individual races
Pos	Helmsman	Country	I	II	III	IV	V	VI	VII	VIII	IX	X	Tot	Pts
Gold medal	Betsy Alison	United States	1	1	2	UFD 12^{†}	1	1	6	1	1	1	27	15
Silver medal	Olga Górnaś-Grudzień	Poland	3	2	1	1	2	4^{†}	2	2	2	2	21	17
Bronze medal	Alison Weatherly	Australia	7^{†}	5	3	3	3	6	1	4	5	4	41	34
4	Valia Galdi	Italy	2	6	4	UFD 12^{†}	8	3	5	3	3	3	49	37
5	Violeta del Reino	Spain	4	4	5	4	5	2	4	5	4	6^{†}	43	37
6	Miray Ulaş	Turkey	6	3	6	2	6	5	7^{†}	6	6	5	52	45
7	Coline Robert	France	5	7^{†}	7	5	4	7	3	7	7	7	59	52
8	Sylvia Leung	Hong Kong	8	8	DNF 12^{†}	6	7	8	8	8	10	10	85	73
9	Zaida Maricel Perez	Chile	10	10	DNF 12^{†}	7	9	9	9	9	9	8	92	80
10	Finy Teitsma	Netherlands	9	9	DNE 12	8	10	10	10	10	11^{†}	9	98	87
11	Marjan Al-Balushi	Oman	DNS 12^{†}	DNF 12	DNS 12	RET 12	DNF 12	11	11	11	8	DNS 12	113	101

Scoring system: low-point system; Source:
Legend: DNE – Non excludable disqualification; DNF – Did not finish; DNS – Did not start; RET – Retired; UFD – "U" flag disqualification; † – Discarded race not counted in the overall result;
