= Susanne Boidin =

Danish sailor (born 1987)

Personal information
- Nationality: Danish
- Born: 18 August 1987 (age 37); Bern, Switzerland

Sailing career
- Club: Royal Danish Yacht Club

Susanne Salminen, née Boidin, (born 18 August 1987) is a Danish sailor who was part of the crew in the Elliott 6m match racing at the 2012 Summer Olympics alongside Tina Gramkov with helm Lotte Meldegaard Pedersen.

Boidin currently resides in Sweden with her husband Max, a fellow former Olympic sailor, her son and her dog.

Boidin holds a master's degree from Copenhagen Business School in business administration and corporate communication. In the past years, she has worked with sports marketing within sailing.
