= 2013 ISAF Women's Match Racing World Championship =

Event details
- Venue: Busan, South Korea
- Dates: 4–9 June
- Titles: 1

Competitors
- Competitors: 45
- Competing nations: 8

Results
- (gold) Gold: (Spain) Echegoyen, Toro, Gonzalez, Lobato & Cacabelos
- (silver) Silver: (Denmark) Ulrikkeholm, Palludan, Ulrikkeholm, Rasmussen & Vestergård Hansen
- (bronze) Bronze: (Australia) Spithill, Angelini, Eastwell, Thomas & Jackson

The 2013 ISAF Women's Match World Championship was held in Busan, South Korea between June 4 and June 9, 2013.

== Participants ==
Crew	Country
Katie Spithill; Alessandra Angelini; Jessica Eastwell; Maryann Thomas; Stacey Jackson	Australia
Camilla Ulrikkeholm; Trine Palludan; Louise Ulrikkeholm; Josefine Boel Rasmussen; Joan Vestergård Hansen	Denmark
Támara Echegoyen; Sofía Toro; Eva Gonzalez; Mariana Lobato; Lara Cacabelos	Spain
Claudia Pierce; Hannah Osborne; Aimee Famularo; Paige Cook; Janelle Peat	New Zealand
Susannah Pyatt; Karleen Dixon; Jenny Egnot; Jenna Hansen; Raynor Haagh	New Zealand
Yekaterina Skudina; Silke Hahlbrock; Ekaterina Chashchina; Tatiana Lartseva; Vera Dubina	Russia
Sung-Eun Choi; Won Hee Seo; Moon Mi Kim; Jin Sook Choi; Som Da Park	South Korea
Anna Kjellberg; Johanna Larsson; Karin Almquist; Linnéa Wennergren; Annie Wennergren	Sweden
Alexa Bezel; Corinne Meyer; Romy Hasler; Manon Luther; Laurane Mettraux	Switzerland

== Results ==
As of end of regatta.

=== Round Robins ===
Pos	Team	Pld	W	L		(Spain) ECH	(Russia) SKU	(Denmark) ULR	(Sweden) KJE	(Australia) SPI	(New Zealand) PYA	(Switzerland) BEZ	(New Zealand) PIE	(South Korea) CHO
1	(Spain) Támara Echegoyen	16	16	0	Advance to Quarter-finals	—	WW	WW	WW	WW	WW	WW	WW	WW
2	(Russia) Yekaterina Skudina	16	13	3	Advance to Quarter-finals	LL	—	WW	WW	WW	LW	WW	WW	WW
3	(Denmark) Camilla Ulrikkeholm	16	10	6	Advance to Quarter-finals	LL	LL	—	WW	WW	WL	WL	WW	WW
4	(Sweden) Anna Kjellberg	16	9	7	Advance to Quarter-finals	LL	LL	LL	—	LW	WW	WW	WW	WW
5	(Australia) Katie Spithill	16	8	8	Advance to Quarter-finals	LL	LL	LL	WL	—	WW	WW	WL	WW
6	(New Zealand) Susannah Pyatt	16	5	11	Advance to Quarter-finals	LL	WL	LW	LL	LL	—	LW	LW	LW
7	(Switzerland) Alexa Bezel	16	5	11	Advance to Quarter-finals	LL	LL	LW	LL	LL	WL	—	LW	WW
8	(New Zealand) Claudia Pierce	16	5	11	Advance to Quarter-finals	LL	LL	LL	LL	LW	WL	WL	—	WW
9	(South Korea) Sung-Eun Choi	16	1	15		LL	LL	LL	LL	LL	WL	LL	LL	—

Updated to match(es) played on unknown. Source:

=== Quarter-finals ===
Team	I	II	III	Pts
(Spain) Támara Echegoyen	W	W	W	3
(New Zealand) Claudia Pierce	L	L	L	0

Team	I	II	III	Pts
(Russia) Yekaterina Skudina	W	W	W	3
(Switzerland) Alexa Bezel	L	L	L	0

Team	I	II	III	Pts
(Denmark) Camilla Ulrikkeholm	W	W	W	3
(New Zealand) Susannah Pyatt	L	L	L	0

Team	I	II	III	Pts
(Sweden) Anna Kjellberg	L	L	L	0
(Australia) Katie Spithill	W	W	W	3

=== Semi-finals ===
Team	I	II	III	Pts
(Spain) Támara Echegoyen	W	W	W	3
(Australia) Katie Spithill	L	L	L	0

Team	I	II	III	IV	V	Pts
(Russia) Yekaterina Skudina	L	W	W	L -0.75	L	1.25
(Denmark) Camilla Ulrikkeholm	W	L	L	W	W	3

=== Placement matches (5–8) ===
Team	I	Pts
(Sweden) Anna Kjellberg	W	1
(New Zealand) Claudia Pierce	L	0

Team	I	Pts
(New Zealand) Susannah Pyatt	L	0
(Switzerland) Alexa Bezel	W	1

=== Petit final ===
Team	I	II	III	Pts
(Russia) Yekaterina Skudina	W	L	L	1
(Australia) Katie Spithill	L	W	W	2

=== Final ===
Team	I	II	III	IV	V	Pts
(Spain) Támara Echegoyen	L	L	W	W	W	3
(Denmark) Camilla Ulrikkeholm	W	W	L	L	L	2
