= Lotta Harrysson =

Swedish sailor

Lise-Lotte Maren "Lotta" Harrysson (born 23 September 1966) is a Swedish Olympic sailor. She finished 12th in the Elliott 6m event at the 2012 Summer Olympics together with Anna Kjellberg and Malin Källström.
