= June Methot =

American sailor

Sailing career
- Sport: Sailing
- Club: Monmouth Boat Club

June Methot is an American sailor who won the 1968 Mrs. Charles Francis Adams Trophy and was the 1968 United States Sailor of the Year.

== Sailing career ==
In 1937, Methot won a class championship at the Monmouth Boat Club. Then, until World War II she raced in the Bird class, and she shifted to sailing in Lightnings in 1947. Methot was a winner skipper in Lightning class boats, and won the New Jersey championship in 1957 which were sailed in Wood Pussy Class catboats.

In 1968 Methot won the Mrs. Charles Francis Adams Trophy, an event she also competed in during the 1954 and 1962 season. In 1968 she sailed with Mrs. Bette Power and Mrs. Dede Heron; they were the first team from New Jersey to win the Adams trophy.

== Awards and honors ==
In 1968 Methot received the Martini & Rossi trophy, becoming the United States' sailor of the year along with Lowell North.

== Personal life ==
During World War II Methot was a pilot when she flew for the Women Airforce Service Pilots. In 1985 Methot published Up and Down the River which is the history of the Navesink River in New Jersey.
