= Women's International Match Racing Series =

Series of boat races

Women's International Match Racing Series (WIM Series)
- First held: 2013
- Type: match-racing series
- Champions: Pauline Courtois (2018)
- Most titles: Pauline Courtois (2)
- Website: wimseries.com

The Women's International Match Racing Series is an annual match racing series for women.

== Winners ==
Year	Winning Skipper	Winning team
2013	Lucy Macgregor (GBR)	Team Mac
2014	Camilla Ulrikkeholm (DEN)	TEAM Ulrikkeholm
2015	Stephanie Roble (USA)	Epic Racing
2016	Anna Östling (SWE)	Team Anna
2017	Pauline Courtois (FRA)	Match In Pink
2018	Pauline Courtois (FRA)	Match In Pink
2019	Lucy Macgregor (GBR)	Team Mac

== See also ==
- World Match Racing Tour
- match racing
- World Sailing Women's Match Racing Ranking
