= Helen Mary Wilkes =

Scottish-Irish sailing sports administrator (born 1941)

- Born: 7 December 1941 (age 83); Scotland
- Occupation: Sports administrator
- Organization: International Optimist Dinghy Association

Helen Mary Wilkes is an international administrator in the sport of sailing from Ireland. She is best known for her promotion of the Optimist dinghy as president of the International Optimist Dinghy Association (IODA). An active committee member of World Sailing for over 35 years, she also served as the first president of the Women's International Match Racing Association (WIMRA).

Wilkes has been awarded the Gold Medal and President's Development Award from World Sailing and is member of the Irish Sailing Association Hall of Fame. She is the recipient of the Laura Rolandi Award of the Cofradía Europea de Vela. The Helen Mary Wilkes Trophy for Top Girl at the Optimist World Championship is named after her.

== Personal life ==
Originally from Scotland, Wilkes and her English husband Robert settled in Ireland in 1969. They are members of Howth Yacht Club, near Dublin. Both their sons have sailed for Ireland.

== Career ==
Wilkes started her career in event organisation. She was secretary to the organising committee of the 1981 Optimist World Championship, which was hosted by the Howth Yacht Club. Despite the fact that the harbour was undergoing redevelopment, the Optimist Worlds brought 130 boats from 26 nations; at the time, it was the most international sailing event to have taken place in Ireland.

=== International Optimist class ===
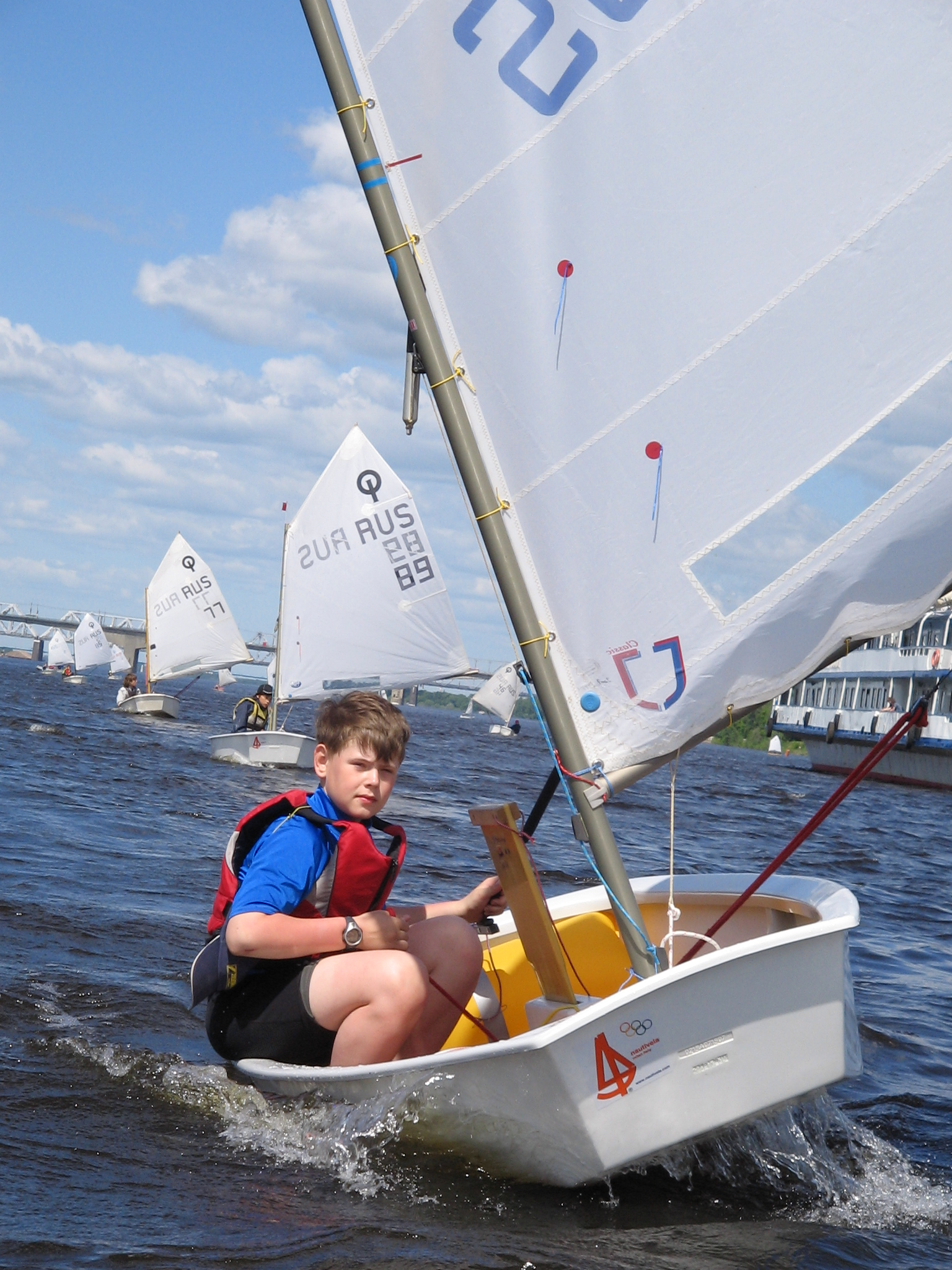
An Optimist class dinghy

In the years that followed, Wilkes moved up the ranks of national and international sailing administration. In 1985, she became vice president of the International Optimist Dinghy Association, and served as president from 1989 to 1998. As president, she led the IOD95 project to reinstate the one-design principle to Optimist class dinghies. Other initiatives included providing support for continental championships and Optimist development programs across Asia, Oceania, Africa, and other regions. In the Caribbean, Helen Mary Wilkes attended the St. Thomas International Optimist Regatta (IOR) in the US Virgin Islands, together with her husband Robert in 1994, and met with representatives from the Virgin Islands, Puerto Rico, Antigua, Martinique, and Trinidad & Tobago. During her tenure, the Optimist class became the largest worldwide, with 87 countries as national members, and 57 countries participating in international events.

In 2005, she was elected president of honour of the IODA. By then, there were 40 manufacturers internationally, building 4,000 Optimist class boats a year. Within twenty years of her taking the helm as president of the IODA, the number of countries participating in the Under-16 Optimist class more than doubled, from 49 to 105. In 2017, Wilkes received a Gold Medal from the ISAF, now known as World Sailing. That year, when she was conferred with Honorary Membership at Howth Yacht Club, Irish Sailing Association President Jack Roy described the impact of her work in the Optimist class as a boost to youth club sailing, the "bedrock of the sport", critical to its future.

=== Women's match racing ===
In 1996, Wilkes was appointed the first president of the Women's International Match Racing Association. Her mandate was to campaign for the recognition of women's match racing as an Olympic sport. She led an unsuccessful bid to get women's match racing added as an 11th Olympic medal event at the 2000 Olympics in Sydney. In 1996, Wilkes, together with Dawn Riley, a member of two America's Cup teams, and Hannah Swett, a member of the Mighty Mary all-female America's Cup team, made a series of presentations at an International Sailing Federation meeting in Brighton, England. Although the International Olympic Committee voted against inclusion of women's match racing in the 2000 Olympics, WIMRA had secured an endorsement from the ISF recognising the class as valid, and gained representation on several boards, including the world match-racing committee.

International participation in the sport increased, and in 2000, it appeared that women's match racing would be included in the 2004 Summer Olympics. However, women's match racing was not included in the Olympic programme until the 2012 Games in London, and in 2011, the ISAF Council voted to remove the women's keelboat event for the 2016 Olympics.

=== World Sailing ===
Wilkes has been involved with World Sailing, the international governing body for sailing, since 1982. In 1995, The Irish Times noted that Wilkes was helping to represent Irish sailing as a member of the international classes committee of the International Yacht Racing Union (as World Sailing was then known).

== Awards and recognition ==
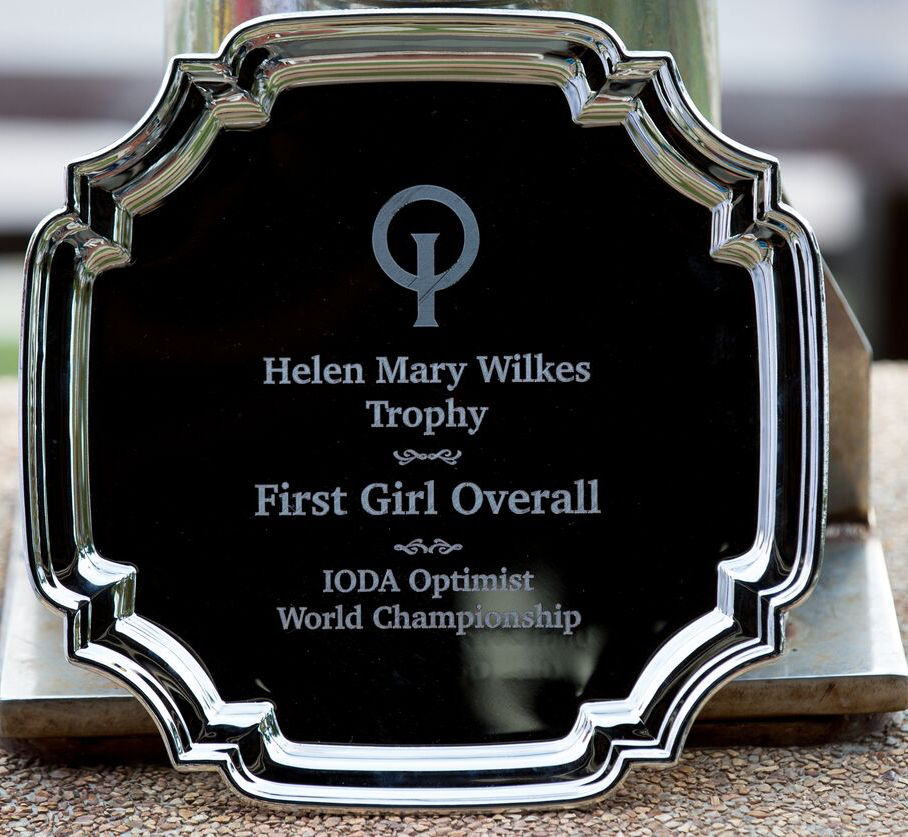
Helen Mary Wilkes Trophy

She has been awarded a Gold Medal and President's Development Award from World Sailing. She is also a member of the Irish Sailing Association Hall of Fame, an honorary member of Howth Yacht Club, and recipient of the Laura Rolandi Award of the Cofradía Europea de Vela.

Since 2017, the cup for the Top Girl at the annual Optimist World Championship has been called the Helen Mary Wilkes Trophy.
