= Tina Gramkov =

Danish sailor (born 1970)

Personal information
- Born: 12 November 1970 (age 55) Virum, Denmark

Sport

Sailing career
- Club: Royal Danish Yacht Club

Tina Schmidt née Gramkov (born 12 November 1970) is a Danish sailor who was part of the crew in the Elliott 6m match racing at the 2012 Summer Olympics. She was in the crew alongside Susanne Boidin for helm Lotte Meldegaard Pedersen.
