= Mariana Lobato =

Portuguese sailor

- Born: December 23, 1987 (age 38); Lisbon
- Education: Escola Superior de Comunicação Social
- Occupations: professional sailor and paramedic
- Known for: sailing

Mariana Lobato (born 23 December 1987) is a Portuguese paramedic and competitive sailor. She competed at the 2012 Olympics and she was a member of Támara Echegoyen's winning crew in the 2013 ISAF Women's Match Racing World Championship. She has competed in transatlantic sailing races.

== Life ==
Lobato was born in Lisbon in 1987. Her family were in to the sport of sailing and by the age of eight she was on a boat. She used an Optimist dinghy and she competed in the under 16 category before she moved on to larger boats. Match racing became her speciality but she had sailed on the Olympic sailing classes of 470 dinghies, 49erFX, and Nacra 17.

She studied in her home city at the Escola Superior de Comunicação Social in 2011, where she completed a degree in Advertising and Marketing.

In 2012 she was a member of crew at Sailing at the 2012 Summer Olympics competing in the Elliott 6m. Rita Gonçalves was the helmsperson and Diana Neves was the third crew member. They had qualified a year before in Perth in Australia in the ISAF Sailing Worlds. In the Olympics they were last but one. The race was won by Támara Echegoyen and in 2013 Echegoyen led a boat in Korea at the Match Racing World Championship. Lobato was a crew member and together with Sofía Toro, Eva Gonzalez and Lara Cacabelos they won the championship.

In 2021 she won The Ocean Race Europe with the Mirpuri Foundation Racing Team on a Volvo Ocean 65 yacht. In The Ocean Race in 2023 she reached fourth place in the IMOCA 60 Biotherm skippered by Paul Meilhat. She and the rest of the crew of Biotherm completed their journey in Genoa. Paul Meilhat's finishing crew were Lobato, Marie Riou and Alan Roberts. The boat had its own reporter and she travelled with them. The voyage had taken six months and over a hundred days of sailing in seven legs.

In 2023 she joined Meilhat for the double-handed Transat Jacques Vabrerace across the Atlantic on the same yacht, which they had to abandon. She is the first sailor from Portugal to take part in the race.

Lobato speaks fluent French.

== Private life ==
She is married with two children.
