= Dunmore East =

Fishing town in County Waterford, Ireland

Dunmore East Dún Mór
- Town
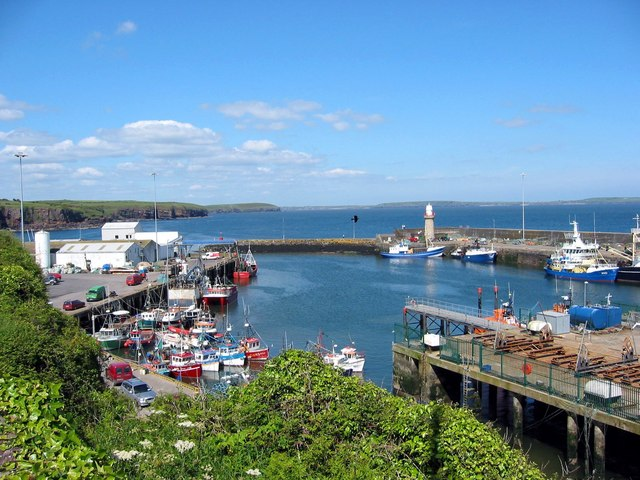
- Dunmore East harbour and lighthouse

- Location in Ireland
- Coordinates: 52.155°N 6.996°W
- Country: Ireland
- Province: Munster
- County: County Waterford
- Elevation: 40 m (130 ft)

Population (2022)
  - Total: 1,731
- Irish Grid Reference: S687007

Dunmore East (Irish: Dún Mór Thóir, meaning 'east big fort') is a tourist and fishing town in County Waterford, Ireland. Situated on the west side of Waterford Harbour on Ireland's southeastern coast, it lies within the barony of Gaultier (An Gháilltír – "land of the foreigner" in Irish); a reference to the influx of Viking and Norman settlers in the area.

== History ==
Iron Age people established a promontory fort overlooking the sea at Shanoon (referred to in 1832 as meaning the 'Old Camp' but more likely Canon Power's Sean Uaimh, "Old Cave") at a point known for centuries as Black Nobb, where the old pilot station now stands, and underneath which a cave runs. Henceforth the place was referred to as Dún Mór, meaning the "Great Fort".

King Henry II granted the knight Heverbricht permission to build a manor at Dunmore East between 1171 and 1189, this was confirmed by King John in 1203. By the early 14th century, much of the manor was owned by the de Boitler and Le Flemming families, the latter becoming embroiled with Robert de Stapleton, the sheriff of Waterford, over possession. It is described as the property of Lord Power of Curraghmore. In c. 1640, Lord Power of Curraghmore, who owned a large amount of property in the area, built a castle on the cliff overlooking the strand about two hundred metres from St. Andrew's Church. The castle was falling into ruin by the 1750s and now just one tower remains.

The old church of Killea (Cill Aodha meaning "Aodh's church") stands at the top of Killea Hill. This dates from 1203 when the church of St Eoth was granted to Herverbrict of Dunmore and one wall still stands. It is situated opposite the Roman Catholic church of the Holy Cross.

In Smith's history of Waterford, the village was mentioned as being a fishing port about the year 1745. The fishermen's homes were situated in the Lower Village near the Strand Inn and boats were launched from the slip at Lawlor's Beach before the harbour was built. There is mention of a fleet of fifty fishing boats working from Dunmore East in 1776.

In 1812, a decision was made at Westminster to create an entirely new landing point for passengers and the Royal Mail coming to Ireland from London and southern England. The location selected for the erection of a pier was Dunmore East. In 1818, significant changes took place when Alexander Nimmo, the Scottish engineer (builder of Limerick's Sarsfield Bridge), commenced work on the new harbour at Dunmore. The work consisted mainly of a large pier or quay with a lighthouse at the end. While Nimmo's original estimate had been £20,000, at the time of his death in 1832 about £93,000 had been spent and the final cost was £108,000. By then (1837), the harbour had started to silt up, and the arrival of steam meant that the winding river could be negotiated easily, so the packet station was transferred to Waterford.

The sheltered harbour then constructed meant that Dunmore East was to gradually become an important fishing port. It also then developed into a popular tourist resort and it is now a port of call for large cruise liners visiting the south-east of Ireland. The Haven Hotel, formerly the Villa Marina, was a home built by David Malcomson of the Malcomson family of Portlaw. David Malcomson married Nanette King of Waterford and he brought his new bride to live in their family home at Dunmore East.

The Fisherman's Hall in the village was also built by Nanette Malcomson in memory of her son Joseph who had been a fisherman and died at a relatively young age. She donated the land for the building and established a deed of trust to build and maintain the hall. On her instructions, no alcohol could be sold or consumed in the Fisherman's Hall. In addition, a fire was to be kept lit to warm and dry any of the fishermen who arrived to read the newspapers which were replenished daily in the reading room which is the present-day library. A 'Blue Plaque' to Nanette Malcomson was unveiled at the Fisherman's Hall in 2025.

== Sport ==
Dunmore East is home to several sporting clubs. Gaultier GAA, which focuses primarily on Gaelic football, is located just outside the village, across the road from Dunmore FC soccer club. Gaultier GAA was founded in 1927 and competes in the Waterford Senior Football Championship as well as catering for over 100 juvenile members. Dunmore FC, the local association football (soccer) club, was founded in the 1970s initially before being re-established in the early to mid-2000s. Waterford Harbour Sailing Club was founded in 1934 has about 250 members and regularly hosts dinghy events.

== Harbour ==
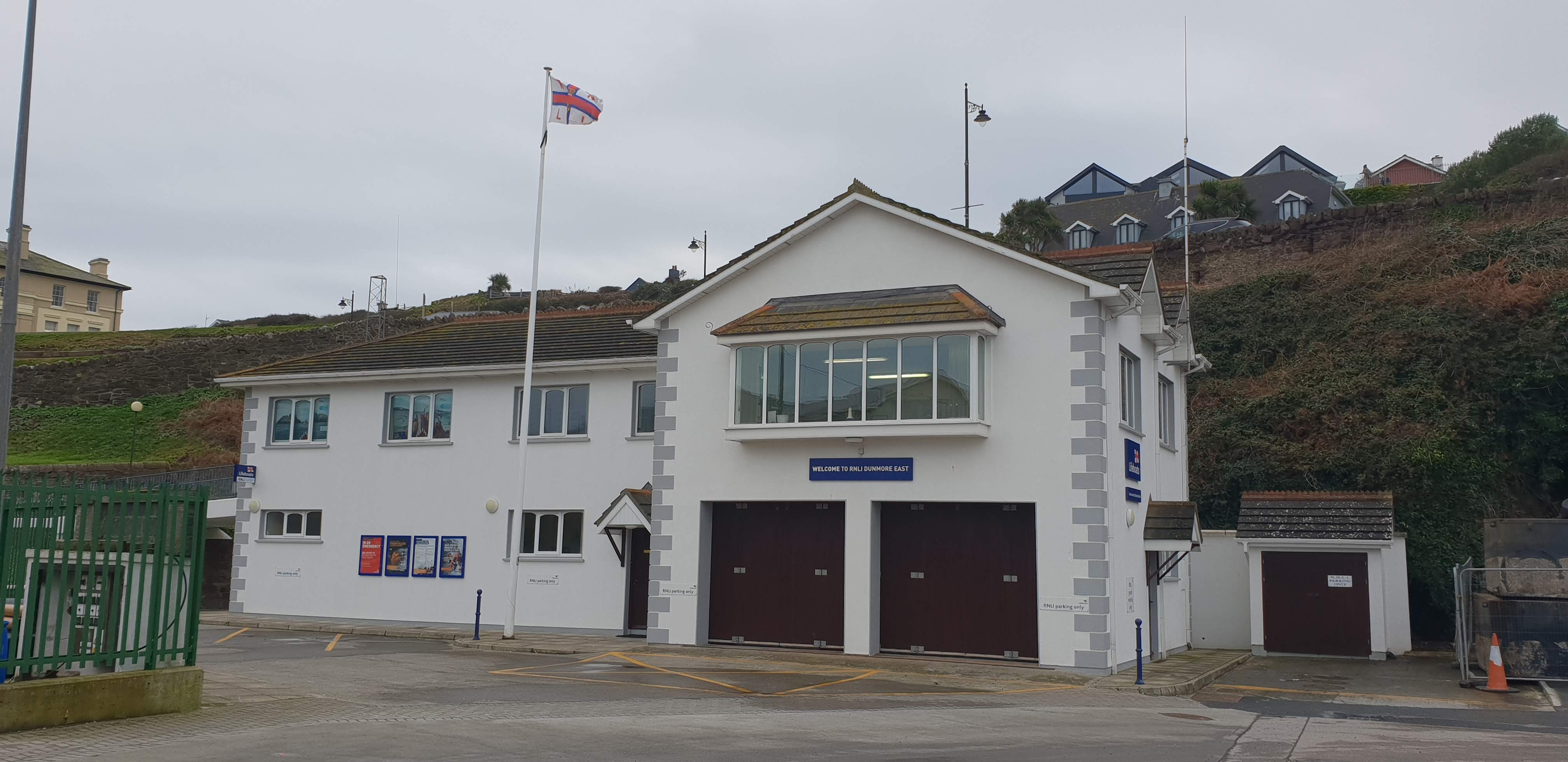
Dunmore East Lifeboat Station

The harbour is one of the five designated National Fishery Harbours, and has the second highest figure for fish landings after Killybegs. In the summer months, it is popular with visiting yachts which have a designated pontoon. A plan was developed in 2005 by Waterford County Council to expand the harbour to accommodate more recreational marine activities. However that plan appears to have been shelved due to lack of funding.

The first official woman crew member in a Royal National Lifeboat Institution (RNLI) Lifeboat was based at Dunmore East.

== Amish-Mennonite Community ==
Ireland's only Amish-Mennonite community resides in Dunmore East. The community consists of approximately 100 individuals, including 15 families. The community operates several enterprises, including a bakery, a bookshop, a petrol station, and training schools for woodworking, forestry, and animal husbandry. Educationally, the community integrates with the Irish curriculum, with children attending schools that prepare them for the Junior Certificate and Leaving Certificate examinations.

== Tourism ==
Tourism in Dunmore East is supported by boating and sailing facilities, holiday homes, traditional pubs, a golf course and several hotels. The village is home to the Waterford Harbour Sailing Club with dinghy and keelboat sailing and the Dunmore East Adventure Centre. The local golf course is located on the cliff top overlooking the bay.

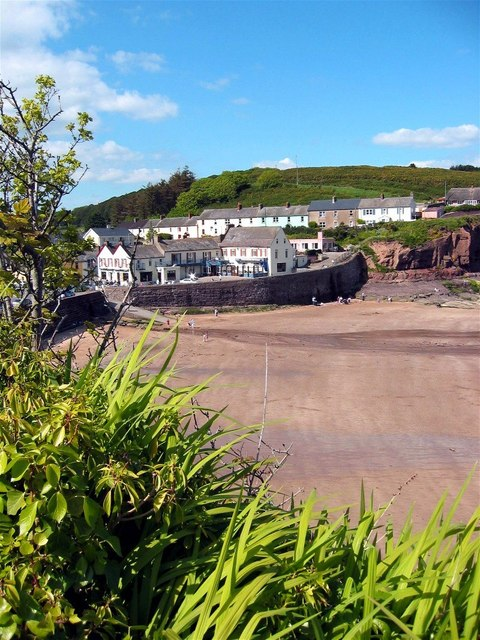
Low tide at Lawlor's Beach in the Lower Village

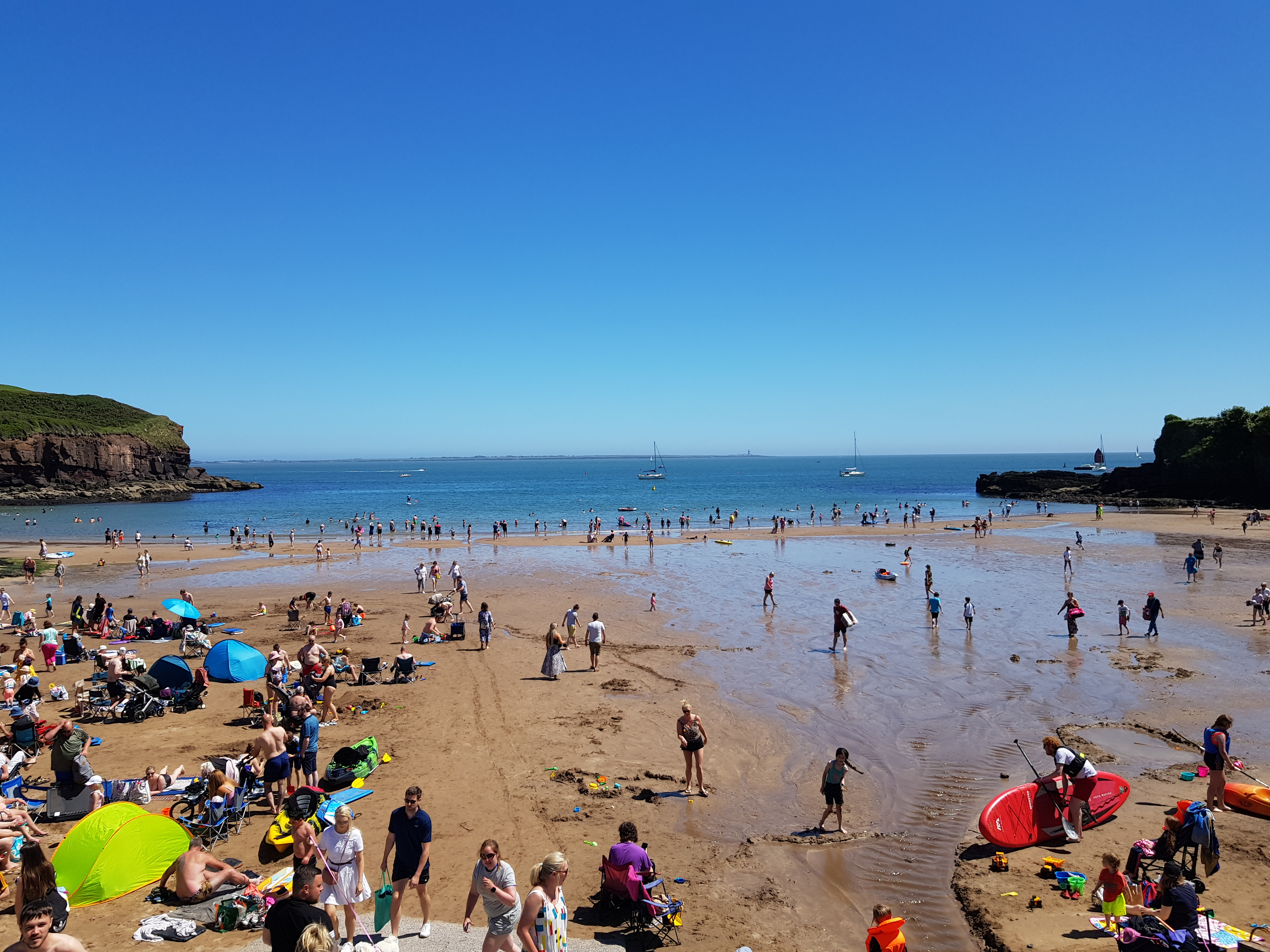
Lawlor's beach in the summer

Dunmore East has a number of seafood restaurants and hotels: The Strand Inn and The Haven Hotel (a former Malcomson property). There are also caravan sites catering for motorhomes and touring caravans.

Among the events held in Dunmore East is the annual bluegrass festival which takes place at the end of August.

A number of tourist walking routes have been opened at Dunmore East. Trails in the woods, which surround the village, consist of a series of marked paths of varying lengths. There is also a cliff path to Portally and on to Ballymacaw which is about 7 km (4 mi) in total length. This includes what may be Ireland's longest sea cave at Rathmoylan. This path starts from the car park at the Shanoon.

== International relations ==
Dunmore East is twinned with the village of Clohars-Carnoët in France.

== Transport ==
Bus Éireann route 354 links the village to Waterford replacing the longstanding Suirway service which ceased in 2022.

== See also ==
- List of towns and villages in Ireland
- List of RNLI stations
