= Real Club Náutico de La Coruña =

- Burgee
- Short name: RCNC
- Founded: 1926; 99 years ago
- Location: Corunna, Spain
- Website: www.rcncoruna.com

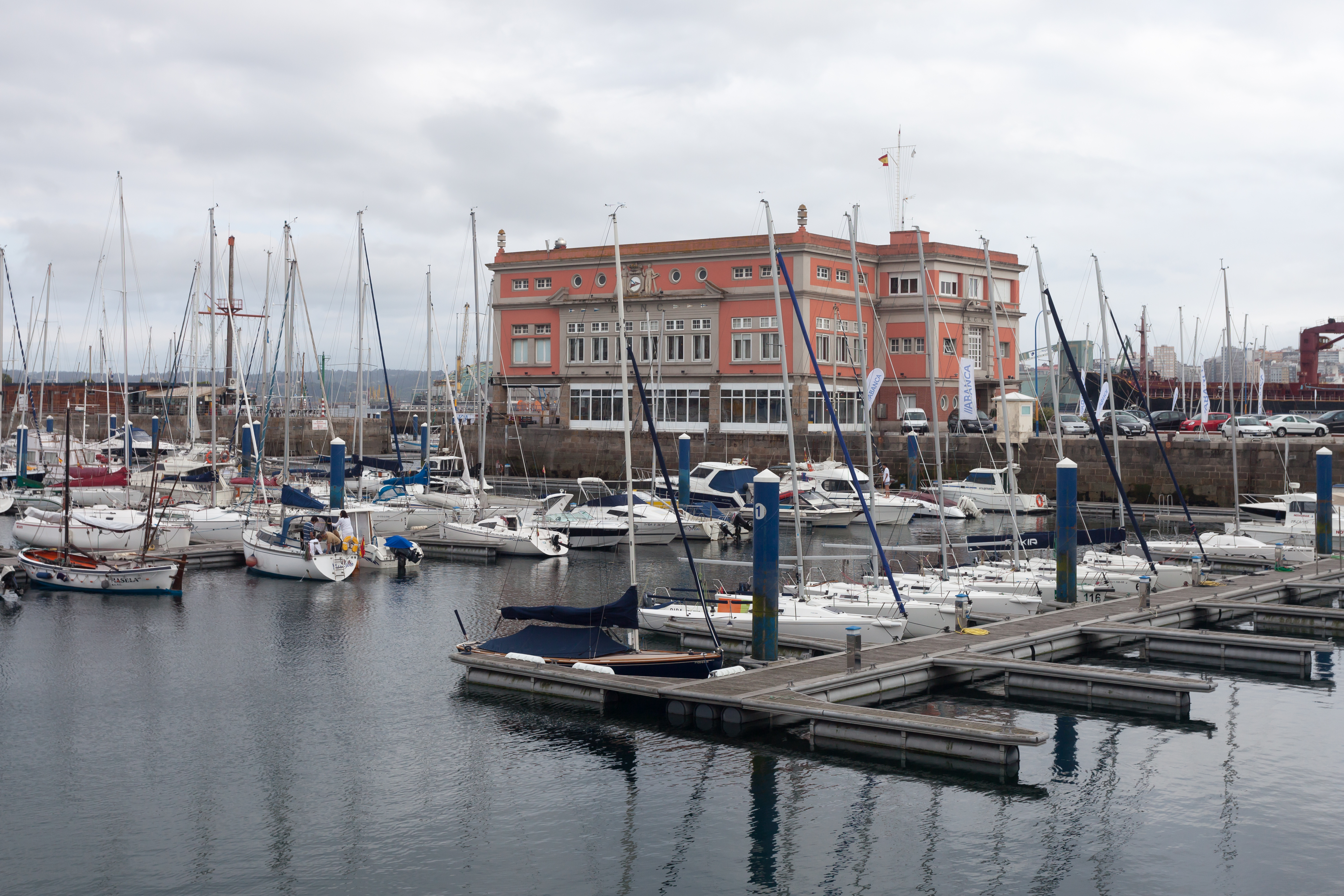
The clubhouse.

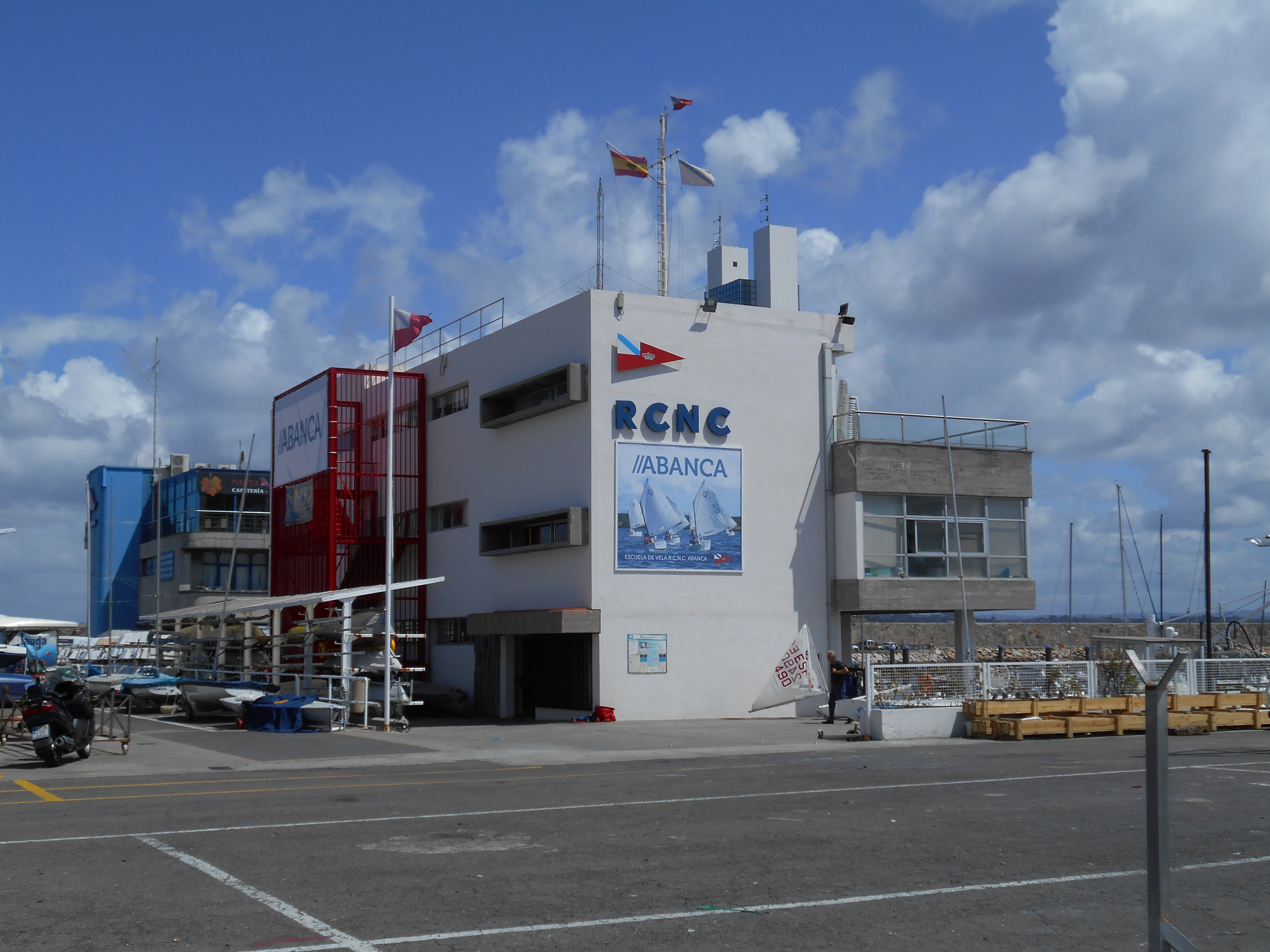
The Sailing School.

Real Club Náutico de La Coruña (Royal Corunna Yacht Club) is a yacht club located in Corunna, Galicia (Spain).

It was established in 1926, and the club's sailing school was created in 1968. Both facilities are located at downtown Corunna.

== Races and fleets ==
The club hosted the 2000 Optimist World Championship and the 2017 Snipe World Championship.

== Notable members ==
- Sofía Toro, gold medallist at the 2012 Summer Olympics in Elliott 6m class.
- Roberto Bermúdez de Castro, 2014–15 Volvo Ocean Race winner with Azzam.
