= Liz Baylis =

American sailor

Personal information
- Born: 17 July 1963 (age 63)

Sailing career
- Sport: Sailing
Medal record
Sailing
Representing United States
World Championships
Gold medal – first place	2002 Calpe	Match racing
Silver medal – second place	2008 Auckland	Match racing

Elizabeth Baylis (born 17 July 1963) is an American sailor competing in match racing. Baylis started her sailing career at an early age in the classic high winds venue of San Francisco Bay. She still calls the Bay her home, but she has accumulated over 50,000 offshore miles including many victorious Pacific Cup and TransPac races from California to Hawaii. She sailed with America True during the 2000 Louis Vuitton Cup. Baylis is probably best known for her match racing accomplishments as a skipper which include the 2002 ISAF Women's Match Racing World Championship. title and multiple Grade 1 championship wins. Her offshore and match racing success were recognized in 2002 when she received the US Rolex Yachtswomen of the Year award. As the executive director of the Women's International Match Racing Association (WIMRA) she led the campaign to include women's match racing in the 2012 Olympics and continues to promote the sport around the world by teaching clinics and running regattas. In 2013, WIMRA successfully launched the first professional match racing series for women (WIM Series) with Baylis taking the role of Series Manager. Baylis is the Chairman of the International Sailing Federation (ISAF) Match Racing Committee.
