= Támara Echegoyen =

Spanish sailor (born 1984)

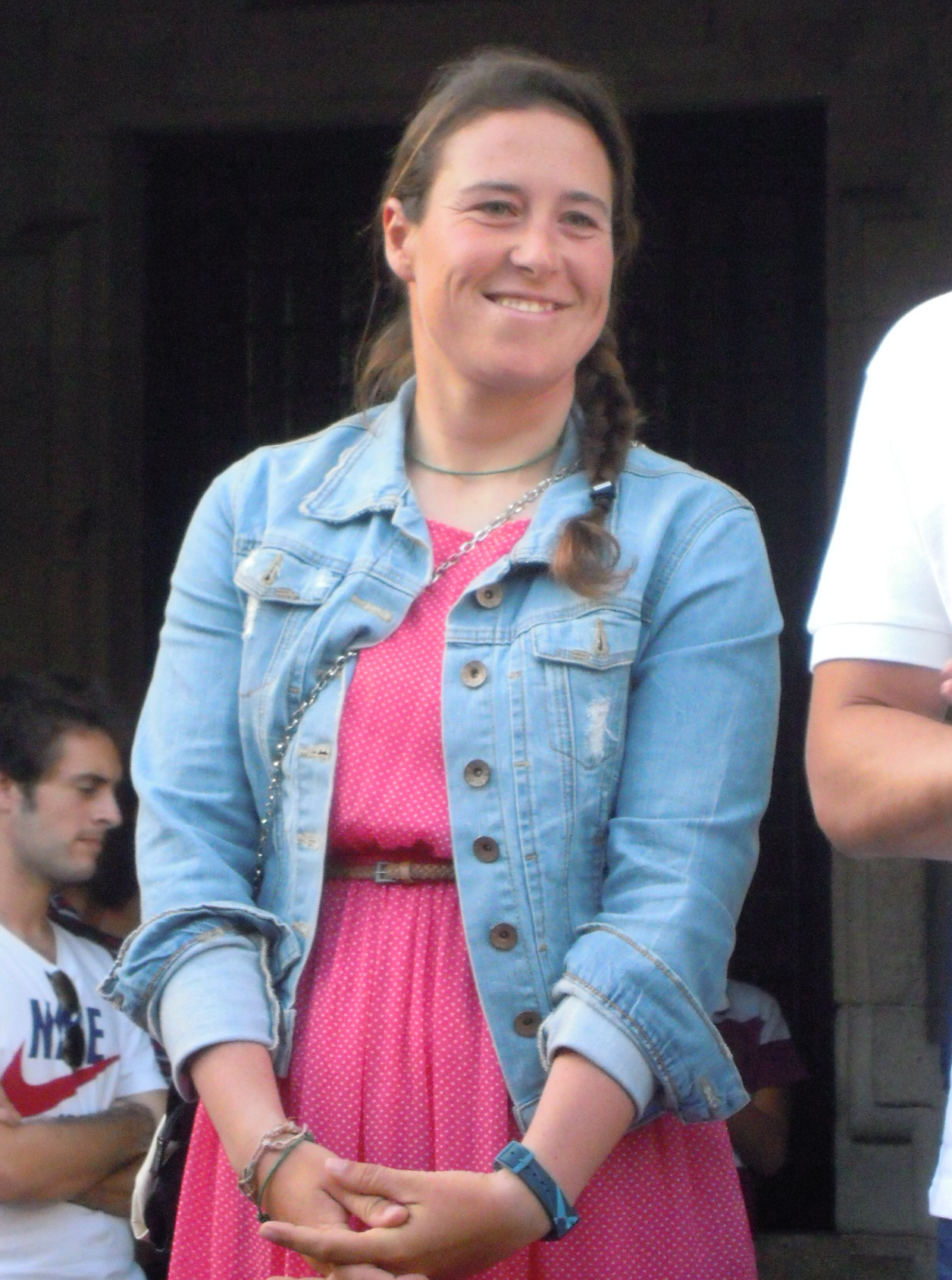
- Echegoyen in 2012

Personal information
- Full name: Támara Echegoyen Domínguez
- Nationality: Spanish
- Born: 17 February 1984 (age 42) Ourense, Spain
- Height: 174 cm (5 ft 9 in)
- Weight: 70 kg (154 lb)

Sailing career
- Sport: Sailing
- Club: Real Club Náutico de Vigo
- Class(es): 49er FX, Elliott 6m, 470, ILCA 6, SB20
Medal record
Women's sailing
Representing Spain
Olympic Games
Gold medal – first place	2012 London	Elliott 6m
World Championships
Gold medal – first place	2013 Busan	Match racing

Támara Echegoyen Domínguez (Note: In this Spanish name, the first or paternal surname is Echegoyen and the second or maternal family name is Domínguez.) (born 17 February 1984 in Ourense) is an Olympic gold medal winning Spanish sailor. She has competed in four Olympics and she carried the flag in the 2024 Olympics Games opening ceremony on the River Seine,

== Life ==
Echegoyen was born in Galicia in Ourense in north-west Spain. She was introduced to sailing aged five in Pontevedra. She was supported by her parents as they thought it would encourage good qualities.

She participated at the 2012 Summer Olympics in Elliott 6m class, and together with her crew, Ángela Pumariega and Sofía Toro, won the gold medal.

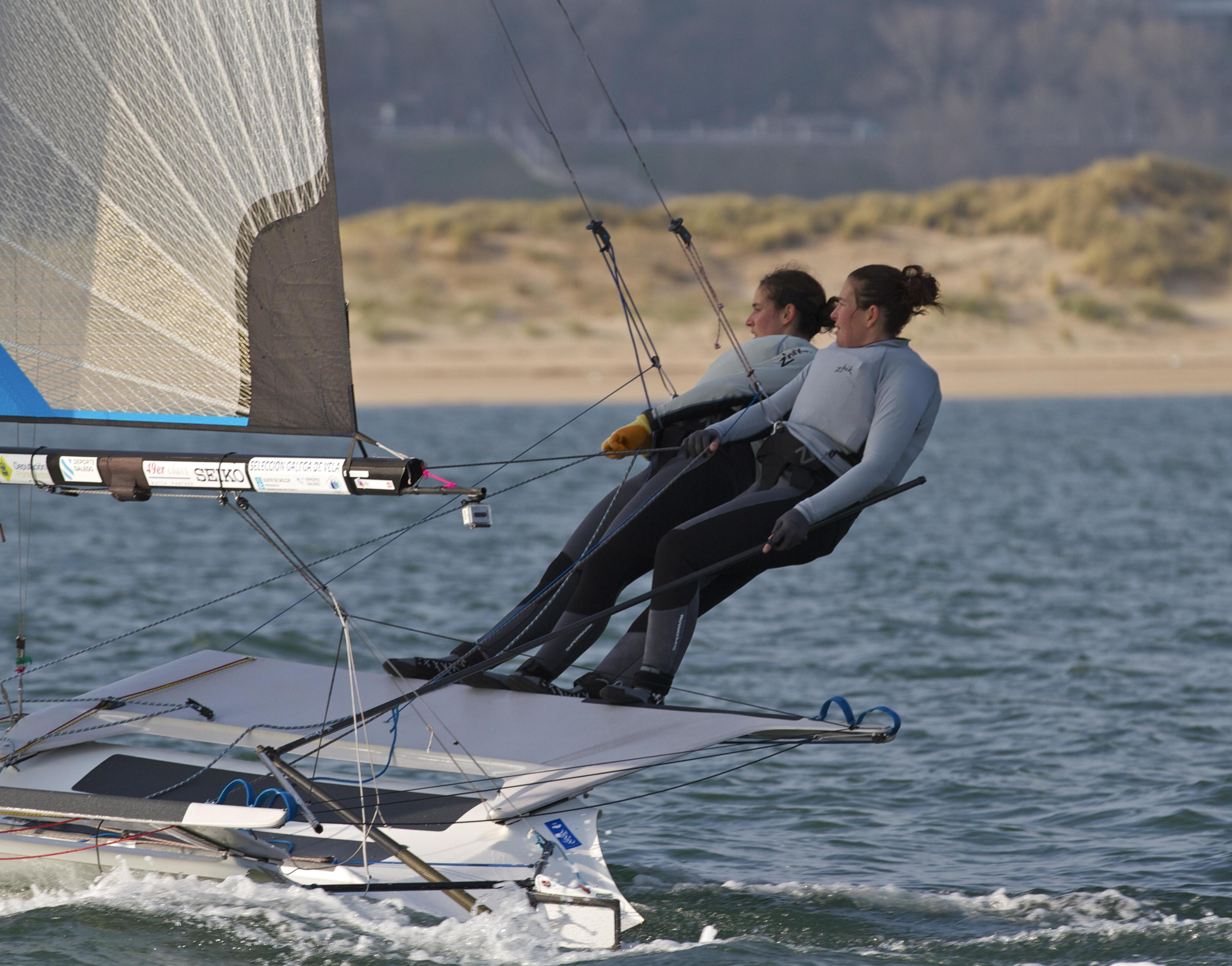
Berta Betanzos and Támara Echegoyen in 2013

In 2013 Echegoyen led a boat in Korea at the Match Racing World Championship. Mariana Lobato was a crew member and together with Sofía Toro, Eva Gonzalez and Lara Cacabelos they won the championship.

She won the 49er FX gold at the 2016 ISAF Sailing World Championships with Berta Betanzos.

For the 2016 Summer Olympics, she competed in the 49er FX class with Berta Betanzos. In 2017–18, she was a crewmember on Mapfre on legs 1, 2, 3 in the Volvo Ocean Race.

She came fourth in the 2020 Olympics in Tokyo and she intended to retire, however she was persuaded by her sailing partner Paula Barceló to compete at just one more Olympics. On June 26, 2024, the Spanish Olympic Committee, chose Echegoyen and the Olympic canoer Marcus Cooper as the Spanish flag bearers at the París 2024 Olympics opening ceremony on the River Seine. The K1 slalom canoeist Maialen Chourraut was offered the honour but she turned it down, because she was competing the next day. Echegoyen was competing at her fourth Olympics and she was considered to have the most outstanding record.

After she and Barcelo compete at the 2024 Olympics, she is then committed to join a team for the (first) women's Americas Cup in 2024. The team consists of Echegoyen, Silvia Mas, María Cantero, Neus Ballester and Paula Barceló.

== See also ==
- List of Olympic medalists in sailing

== Notes ==
Olympic Games
Preceded by Saúl Craviotto; Mireia Belmonte	Flagbearer for Spain; París 2024; With: Marcus Cooper	Succeeded by Incumbent
