= Sofía Toro =

Spanish sailor

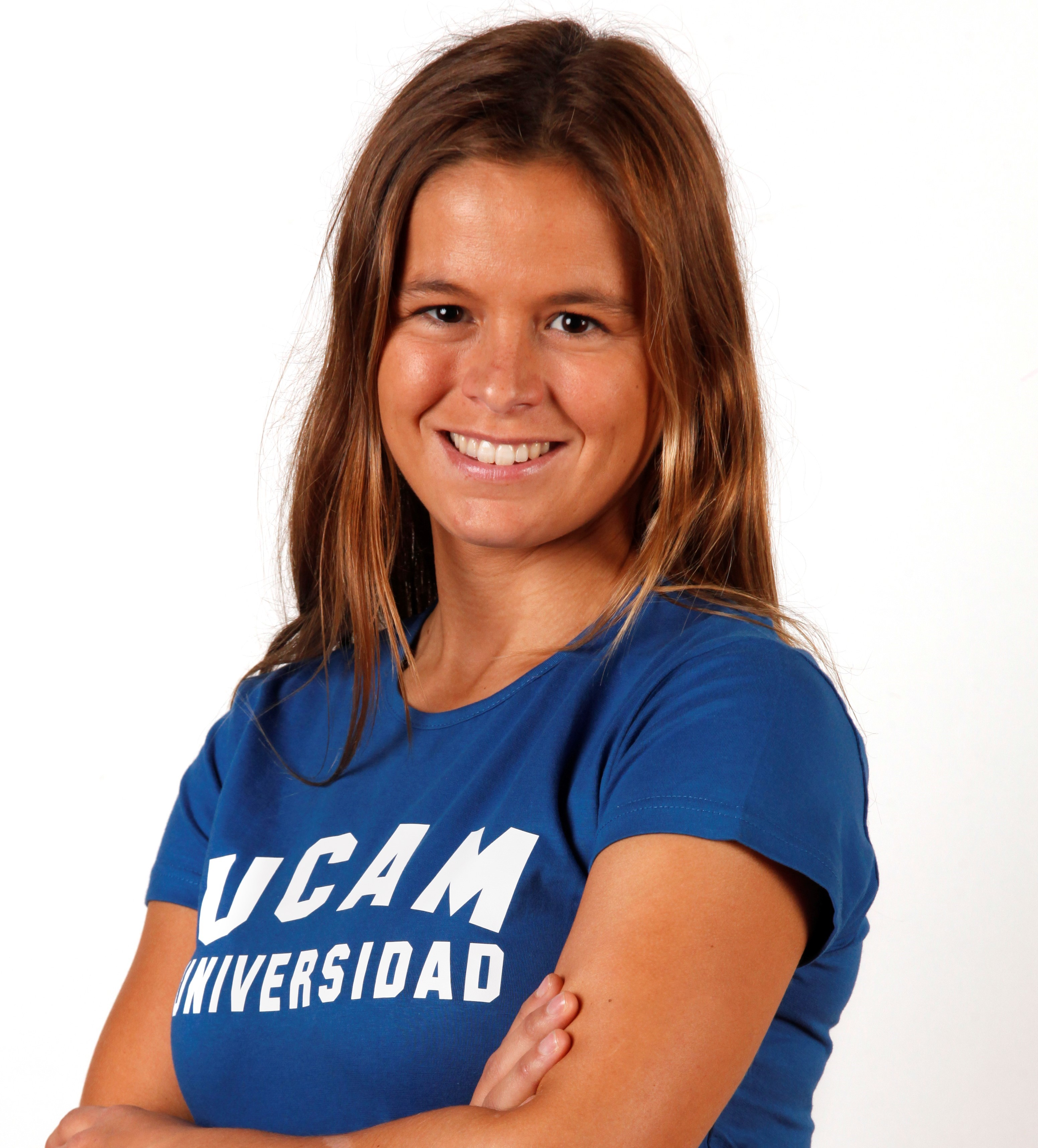
- Toro in 2015

Personal information
- Full name: Sofía Toro Prieto-Puga
- Nationality: Spanish
- Born: 19 August 1990 (age 35) A Coruña, Spain
- Height: 159 cm (5 ft 3 in)
- Weight: 68 kg (150 lb)

Sailing career
- Sport: Sailing
- Club: Real Club Náutico de La Coruña
- Class(es): Elliott 6m, 470
Medal record
Women's sailing
Representing Spain
Olympic Games
Gold medal – first place	2012 London	Elliott 6m
World Championship
Gold medal – first place	2013 Busan	Match racing

Sofía Toro Prieto-Puga (Note: In this Spanish name, the first or paternal surname is Toro and the second or maternal family name is Prieto-Puga.) (born 19 August 1990, in A Coruña, Galicia) is a Spanish sailor. She won a gold medal at the 2012 Summer Olympics in Elliott 6m class. She was in a crew led by Támara Echegoyen along with Ángela Pumariega.

== See also ==
- List of Olympic medalists in sailing
