= Nicky Souter =

Australian sailor

Personal information
- Nationality: Australian
- Born: Nicole Souter; 6 May 1984 (age 42) Sydney, Australia

Sailing career
- Sport: Sailing
- Club: Royal Prince Alfred Yacht Club, Sydney, Australia New York Yacht Club, USA
Medal record
Sailing
Representing Australia
World Championships
| Gold medal – first place | 2009 Lysekil | Match racing |
| Bronze medal – third place | 2010 Newport, Rhode Island | Match racing |

Nicky Souter (born 6 May 1984) is an Australian sailor competing in match racing. Souter won the 2009 ISAF Women's Match Racing World Championship and placed 3rd in the 2010 Women's Match Racing World Championships. In 2010, Souter was named Australian Female Sailor of the Year.
