= Julia Trotman =

American sailor (born 1968)

Personal information
- Born: March 25, 1968 (age 58) New York City, New York, U.S.
- Education: Harvard University
- Spouse: Jim Brady
Medal record
Women's sailing
Representing the United States
Olympic Games
Bronze medal – third place	1992 Barcelona	Europe class

Julia Lyman Trotman (born March 25, 1968) is an American former competitive sailor who won a bronze medal at the 1992 Olympic Games in Barcelona in the Women's One Person Dinghy sailing event. She was the Collegiate Women's Single-handed Champion in both 1989 and 1992, as well as 1992 Rolex Yachtswoman of the Year. She served as captain of the women's ice hockey and sailing teams at Harvard in 1989. She was inducted into the Harvard Athletic Hall of Fame in 2004. She was inducted into the Andover Academy Athletics Hall of Fame in 2012.

She was born in New York City, New York. She was married to former Olympic silver medalist, Jim Brady. They have two daughters, Lila and Claire.

== Career ==
At the 1992 Summer Olympics, Trotman finished in 3rd place in the Europe class. After graduating from Harvard, she became an editorial assistant at American Heritage magazine. She went to Harvard Business School (1997), worked at McKinsey for four years and then The VIA Agency for 15 years. She is now a partner at Valo Ventures in Palo Alto, CA.
