= Sally Barkow =

American sailor

Sailing career
- Sport: Sailing
- College team: Old Dominion University
Medal record
Sailing
Representing United States
World Championships
Gold medal – first place	2004 Annapolis	Match racing
Gold medal – first place	2005 Hamilton	Match racing

Sally Barkow (born 10 July 1980) is an American professional sailor competing in the Olympic & offshore in the Volvo Ocean Race. US Sailing (2019-10-24). "Sally Barkow joins US Sailing Olympic Program".

She won the 2004 and 2005 ISAF Women's Match Racing World Championship, is a three-time winner of the International Women's Keelboat Championship, and competed at the 2008 Summer Olympics.

She won the ICSA Women's Dinghy National Championship in 2002.
