= Spækhugger =

- Class symbol

Development
- Designer: Peter Bruun
- Year: 1969
- Builder: Flipper Scow

Boat
- Draft: 1.45 m (4.8 ft)

Hull
- LOA: 7.44 m (24.4 ft)
- LWL: 6.31 m (20.7 ft)
- Beam: 2.33 m (7.6 ft)

Spækhugger (lit. Killer Whale) is a 7.44-metre (24.4 ft) sailboat class designed by Peter Bruun and built in about 500 copies.

== History ==
The Spækhugger was designed in 1969 for cruising and racing and become the most popular boat in Denmark during the 1970s.
