= Laura Baldwin (sailor) =

British sailor (born 1980)

Personal information
- Full name: Laura Jane Baldwin
- Nationality: British; Australian
- Born: 17 January 1980 (age 46)

Sailing career
- Sport: Sailing
Medal record
Sailing
Representing Australia
Women's Match Racing World Championship
Bronze medal – third place	2010 Newport	Sonar

Laura Jane Baldwin (born 17 January 1980) is a British sailor who competed in the 2004 Summer Olympics sailing the Europe dinghy.

== Career highlights ==
- 2004 Athens Olympics - British Olympic sailor in the women’s one person event, the Europe class
- 2006 - ISAF World Ranked #2 in the Laser Radial class
- 2008 Beijing Olympics - Australian Team Media and Marketing
- 2010 - Australian Laser Radial Women’s Champion & Bronze medalist in the ISAF Women’s Match Racing World Championships
- 2012 London Olympics - Sailing Coach to Krystal Weir (AUS)
- 2016 Rio Olympics - Sailing Coach to Maria Erdi (HUN)

== Activism ==
Baldwin is a member of the World Olympians Association's Environment Committee. She is the Founder of "Portland 4 the Planet" a Transition Town group. Baldwin is in the Green Party of England and Wales's Executive Campaigns Committee and is in her town's council climate action working group.

In November 2020, Baldwin joined Champions for Earth.

In 2020, Baldwin joined Ocean Rebellion protests against cruise ships moored off Weymouth during the global COVID-19 pandemic. She is a spokesperson for Extinction Rebellion.

In October 2021, Baldwin was part of a group of Extinction Rebellion activists blockading the entrance to Fawley Refinery in Hampshire, alongside fellow Olympian Etienne Stott.

In 2023, she campaigned against the proposed Portland Port waste incinerator.
