= Malin Källström =

Swedish sailor

Anna Malin Elisabet Källström (born 14 May 1969) is a Swedish Olympic sailor. She finished 12th in the Elliott 6m event at the 2012 Summer Olympics together with Anna Kjellberg and Lotta Harrysson.
