= Paula Lewin =

Bermudan sailor

Personal information
- Nationality: Bermudian
- Born: 26 June 1971 (age 55) Hamilton, Bermuda
- Height: 172 cm (5 ft 8 in)
- Weight: 63 kg (139 lb; 9 st 13 lb)

Sport
- Sport: Sailing
- College team: Massachusetts Institute of Technology
Medal record
Women's sailing
Representing Bermuda
Pan American Games
Bronze medal – third place	1995 Mar del Plata	Europe

Paula Lewin (born 26 June 1971) is a Bermudian sailor. She competed at the 1992 Summer Olympics, 1996 Summer Olympics, and 2004 Summer Olympics.
