= Royal Gothenburg Yacht Club =

- Burgee
- Short name: GKSS
- Founded: 1860
- Location: Gothenburg, Sweden
- Website: http://www.gkss.se/en/

Royal Gothenburg Yacht Club (Swedish: Göteborgs Kungliga Segelsällskap, GKSS) is a yacht club in Gothenburg, Sweden. It was founded in 1860. Royal Gothenburg Yacht Club resides in Långedrag and Marstrand.

Royal Gothenburg Yacht Club organises Stena Match Cup Sweden.
