= Karen Johnson (sailor) =

Canadian sailor (born 1962)

Personal information
- Born: 13 February 1962 (age 64) Montreal, Quebec, Canada

Sport
- Sport: Sailing

Karen Johnson (born 13 February 1962) is a Canadian sailor. She competed in the women's 470 event at the 1988 Summer Olympics.
