= Malin Millbourn =

Swedish sailor

Personal information
- Born: 29 December 1971 (age 54)

Sailing career
- Sport: Sailing
- Class: Europe
Medal record
Sailing
Representing Sweden
World Championships
Gold medal – first place	2003 Sundsvall	Match racing

Malin Millbourn (born 29 December 1971) is a Swedish Olympic sailor competing in match racing. She won the 2003 ISAF Women's Match Racing World Championship.
