= Nicole Breault =

American sailor

Sailing career
- Sport: Sailing
- College team: Yale University
- Club: Niantic Bay Yacht Club; St. Francis Yacht Club

Nicole Breault is American sailor who is a four-time winner of the U.S. Women’s Open Championship. As of 2021, she sails out of St. Francis Yacht Club.

== Sailing history ==
Breault grew up in Old Lyme, Connecticut and graduated in 1990 as class valedictorian from Old Lyme High School.

She was two years old when she started sailing, and she grew up sailing with her parents, brother, and others. By age seven she had joined Niantic Bay Yacht Club and raced in the International 420 class in Long Island Sound and in world championships held in multiple countries. Breault was the first woman to win the national championship for the International 420, and went on to win it a second time. In her senior year of high school she was an all-state selection in girls' soccer and captained the sailing team to a state championship. In college, she sailed for Yale University and graduated in 1994. After college she returned to Old Lyme High School and taught history and coached soccer.

Breault won the Allegra Knapp Mertz Trophy for the winner of the U.S. Women’s Open Championship in 2015, 2016, 2018, and 2021. In 2018, she was undefeated during the championship event held at St. Francis Yacht Club. She was again undefeated when she won in 2021; she sailed with Molly Carapiet and Karen Loutzenheiser during all four of her wins. Other notable wins include the 2015 Mayor’s Cup ISAF Grade 3 Women’s Match Race in Long Beach, California; and winning the gold medal at the 2015 ISAF Nation’s Cup Grand Final Women’s Division in Vladivostok, Russia. Breault has raced in multiple classes including Lightnings, J/105. She prefers inshore one-design sailing, and sails in both match racing events and fleet racing events. As of April 2021, Breault was the top ranked women's matching race sailor in the United States and #3 in the world; in the open rankings she is ranked #7 in the United States and #39 in the world.

Sailing is in the family around Breault. Breault's husband, Bruce Stone, is a sailor and she has sailed with him at times serving either as skipper or main trimmer/tactician, or doing doublehanded races in San Francisco Bay when the COVID-19 pandemic curtailed her 2020 racing plans. Her father has stories of sailing his Dolphin 24 Marionette with Breault and her brother Mike is also a sailor. Breault enjoys coaching sailing, and has started a Learn-to-Sail program for women at St. Francis Yacht Club.

== Awards and honors ==
In college, Breault was named a Women's All-American sailor her sophomore year and was Honorable Mention for Coed All-American in 1993 and 1994. Breault was named the 2017 St. Francis Yacht Club's Jerome B. White Yachtsman of the Year, the first women to receive the honor. In 2019 Breault made the shortlist for the United States' Rolex Yachtswoman of the year. In 2022, Breault was announced as one of the shortlist for the 2021 US Sailor of the Year Awards.
