= Betsy Alison =

American sailor

Personal information
- Full name: Elizabeth Gelentis Alison
- Born: March 25, 1960 (age 66)

Sailing career
- Sport: Sailing
- College team: Tufts University

Elizabeth "Betsy" Gelentis Alison (born March 25, 1960) is an American sailor who has been voted Rolex Yachtswoman of the Year five times. She was inducted into the United States' National Sailing Hall of Fame in 2011

== Sailing history ==
Alison started sailing sunfish as a child at the behest of her father and, while she did not initially enjoy it, she rapidly enjoyed being with her friends on Barnegat Bay. Starting in 1977, Alison sailed on Upper Mystic Lake while a college student at Tufts University, and there she learned the technical aspects of racing from her teammates. In 1981 she was received honorable mention for college All-American sailor.

Alison has won numerous events during her sailing career. In 1985, Alison won her first Rolex International Women's Keelboat championship, thereby receiving the Bengt Julin trophy. She won four additional times, and the original trophy was retired to her after 1997 when she earned it for the third consecutive year. In 1998 Alison won Women's Match Racing event at the ISAF Sailing World Championships held in Dubai, UAE and was honored with her first ISAF World Sailor of the Year award. Sailing with Lee Icyda and Suzy Leech, Alison won the 2003 Open Yngling World Championship held in Rostock, Germany which was the first time an all-woman's crew won the Open Yngling World Championship.

in 1998 Alison began coaching the US team for the World Disabled Sailing Championship and is the US Sailing Team Sperry Top-Sider Paralympic coach. She played a key role in the 1996 revision of the Disabled Sailing Manual revision and, as of 2021, Alison is the Chair of the Para World Sailing Committee.

== Awards ==
In 1990 and 1991 she won the Mrs. Charles Francis Adams Trophy. In 2009, Alison received the Gay S. Lynn Memorial Trophy for her work with adaptive sailing and sailors with disabilities. In 2011 Alison was in the first group of sailors, and the only woman, elected into the United States' National Sailing Hall of Fame. In 2015, Alison won the President's Development Award from the International Sailing Federation (ISAF, known as World Sailing as of 2015) who recognized her for outstanding achievement in her work on the Para World Sailing Championships in 2015.
