= Irish Sailing Association =

National governing body for sailing, powerboating and windsurfing in Ireland

Irish Sailing Association ISA or Irish Sailing
- IOC nation: Ireland (IRL)
- Sport: Sailing
- Other sports: Powerboating; Windsurfing
- Official website: www.sailing.ie

HISTORY
- Year of formation: 1945
- Former names: Irish Yachting Association
- Membership size: approx. 20,000

AFFILIATIONS
- International federation: International Sailing Federation (ISAF)
- ISAF members page: www.sailing.org/about-isaf/mna/ireland.php
- Continental association: EUROSAF
- National Olympic Committee: Olympic Federation of Ireland
- National Paralympic Committee: Irish Paralympic Committee
- Address: 3 Park Road; Dún Laoghaire; Co Dublin
- Country: Ireland
- Chief Executive: Harry Hermon

The Irish Sailing Association (Irish: Cumann Seoltóireachta na hÉireann), also known as Irish Sailing, is the national governing body for sailing, powerboating and windsurfing in Ireland.

== Strategic areas ==
=== Clubs and membership ===
Irish Sailing accepts membership both from sailing clubs and individuals across Ireland.

=== Training ===
Irish Sailing co-ordinates training courses across Ireland.

=== Sailing and yachting ===
The promotion of sailing and yachting in non-competitive environments.

=== Racing ===
Irish Sailing administers sail and yacht racing across Ireland, including the following:

- ECHO & IRC handicaps;
- Sail Numbers;
- Race Officials and training;
- Rules;
- Classes;
- Match Racing;
- Team Racing;
- Powerboat Racing.

It also looks after Irish involvement in International racing.

== Notable sailors ==
See: Category:Irish sailors

== Offshore sailing ==
See: Category:Irish sailors (sport)

== Olympic sailing ==
See:

- Ireland at the 1948 Summer Olympics#Sailing
- Ireland at the 1952 Summer Olympics#Sailing
- Ireland at the 1960 Summer Olympics#Sailing
- Ireland at the 1964 Summer Olympics#Sailing
- Ireland at the 1972 Summer Olympics#Sailing
- Ireland at the 1976 Summer Olympics#Sailing
- Ireland at the 1980 Summer Olympics#Sailing
- Ireland at the 1984 Summer Olympics#Sailing
- Ireland at the 1988 Summer Olympics#Sailing
- Ireland at the 1992 Summer Olympics#Sailing
- Ireland at the 2000 Summer Olympics#Sailing
- Ireland at the 2004 Summer Olympics#Sailing
- Ireland at the 2008 Summer Olympics#Sailing
- Ireland at the 2012 Summer Olympics#Sailing
- Ireland at the 2016 Summer Olympics#Sailing
- Ireland at the 2020 Summer Olympics#Sailing
- Ireland at the 2024 Summer Olympics#Sailing

== Hall of fame ==
The Irish Sailing Association operates a hall of fame that includes:

- Clayton Love
- Helen Mary Wilkes
- Ken Ryan

== Yacht clubs ==
See Category:Yacht clubs in Ireland
