= Danish Sailing Association =

Sports governing body in Denmark

- IOC nation: Denmark (DEN)
- Sport: Sailing
- Official website: www.sejlsport.dk

HISTORY
- Preceding organisations: Royal Danish Yacht Club
- Year of formation: 1913
- Former names: 1907

AFFILIATIONS
- International federation: World Sailing (WS)
- WS members page: www.sailing.org/about-isaf/mna/denmark.php
- National Olympic Committee: Danish Olympic Committee
- National Paralympic Committee: Danish Paralympic Committee

ELECTED
- President: Hans Natorp

SECRETARIAT
- Address: Idraettens Hus; Broendby; DK-2605
- Country: Denmark
- Secretary General: Dan Ibsen
- Olympic team manager: Thomas Jacobsen

The Danish Sailing Association (Danish: Dansk Sejlunion) is the national governing body for the sport of sailing in Denmark, recognised by World Sailing.

== Classes ==
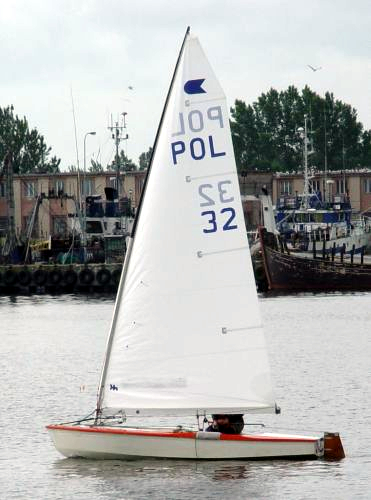
OK in 2004

The following class organisations are affiliated to the Danish Sailing Association:

- 29er
- 505
- Albin Express
- Aphrodite 101
- BB 10
- CB 66 Racer
- Contender
- Europe
- Formula 18
- H-boat
- Hobie Cat
- ILCA (4, 6, and 7)
- International 806
- International A-class catamaran
- J/70
- J/80
- kiteboarding classes
- L 23
- Molich 10 M
- Nordic Folkboat
- OK
- Optimist
- RS Feva
- RS Tera
- Snipe
- Spækhugger
- Star
- windsurfing classes
- X-99
- Yngling
- Zoom 8

== Notable sailors ==
See Category:Danish sailors

=== Olympic sailing ===
See Category:Olympic sailors for Denmark

=== Offshore sailing ===
See Category:Danish sailors (sport)

== Yacht clubs ==
See Category:Yacht clubs in Denmark
