= Korea Sailing Federation =

Governing body for the sport of sailing in South Korea

Korea Sailing Federation KSAF
- IOC nation: Korea (KOR)
- Sport: Sailing
- Official website: www.ksaf.org

AFFILIATIONS
- International federation: International Sailing Federation (ISAF)
- ISAF members page: www.sailing.org/about-isaf/mna/korea.php
- National Paralympic Committee: Korean Olympic Committee

ELECTED
- President: Soonho Park

SECRETARIAT
- Address: Seoul
- Secretary General: Joonnyun Kim

FINANCE
- Company status: Association

The Korea Sailing Federation is the national governing body for the sport of sailing in South Korea, recognised by the International Sailing Federation.

== Famous Sailors ==
See Category:South Korean sailors

Sang Hyun Cho first South Korean to race in Rolex Sydney Hobart Yacht Race in 2014. He is also the first Korean to race Rolex Fastnet yacht race in 2015. He also completed in the 2013-2014 Clipper Round the World Race. Currently hold the M32 World Match Racing tour licence.

Kim Dong Young (young) is the main man whom set up Team Korea. Team competed in the 34th Americas Cup series in San Francisco Bay & Extreme World racing tour.

Han KIM and Andrew (Kwangmin) Rho were the Second South Korean sailors to compete in Rolex Sydney Hobart Yacht Race in 2015. Han participated as part of the 2015-16 Clipper Round the World Race and Andrew with a sailing training program. The two of them took the first Korean team, SONIC, to the 2016 RSHYR, Andrew as the Skipper and Han as the Sailing Master.

=== Olympic sailing ===
See Category:Olympic sailors of South Korea

== Yacht clubs ==
See Category:Yacht clubs in South Korea
