= Claire Leroy =

French sailor

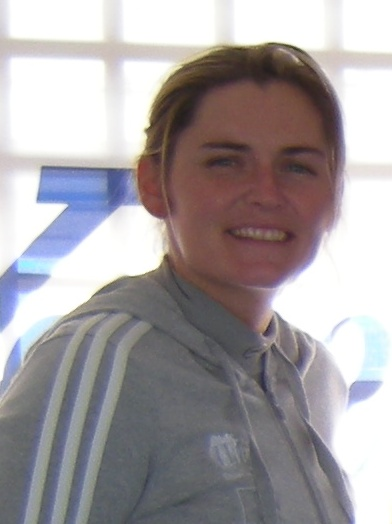
- Claire Leroy in Saint-Quay-Portrieux 2011

Personal information
- Born: 9 March 1980 (age 46) Nantes, France

Sailing career
- Sport: Sailing
Medal record
Sailing
Representing France
World Championships
| Gold medal – first place | 2007 Saint Quay | Match racing |
| Gold medal – first place | 2008 Auckland | Match racing |
| Bronze medal – third place | 2004 Annapolis | Match racing |
| Bronze medal – third place | 2005 Hamilton | Match racing |
| Bronze medal – third place | 2011 Perth | Match racing |

Claire Leroy (born 9 March 1980 in Nantes) is a French sailor. In 2007 and 2008 she won the world championships in female match racing. She was named the International Sailing Federation's female World Sailor of the Year for 2007.

Leroy competed for France at the 2012 Summer Olympics.
