= Pauline Courtois =

French sailor

Personal information
- Born: 27 April 1989 (age 37)

Sailing career
- Country: France
- Sport: Sailing
Medal record
World Championships
Silver medal – second place	2018 Ekaterinburg	Match racing
Bronze medal – third place	2019 Lysekil	Match racing
Gold medal – first place	2021 Cherbourg	Match racing
Gold medal – first place	2022 Auckland	Match racing
Gold medal – first place	2023 Middelfart	Match racing
Gold medal – first place	2024 Jeddah	Match racing
Gold medal – first place	2025 Chicago	Match racing

Pauline Courtois (French pronunciation: [pɔlin kuʁtwa]; born 27 April 1989) is a French sailor competing in match racing. She won the Women's Match Racing World Championship five years running, from 2021 to 2025.

Courtois began sailing at the age of seven in Optimist dinghies.

She has competed in the Women's Match Racing World Championships, finishing second in 2018 and third in 2019 before her five consecutive wins between 2021 and 2025. In Jeddah in 2024, she and her team of Maelenn Lemaitre, Louise Acker, Sophie Faguet, and Laurane Mettraux claimed the championship after winning all their 21 races.

As of 2023, her favourite match racing yacht is the Elliott 6m.

In addition to inshore sailing, she competed in the two-handed 2023 Paprec Transat with Corentin Horeau, finishing in third place.

When not sailing competitively, Courtois works as a sports teacher in Brest.
