= Lotte Meldgaard Pedersen =

Danish sailor

Personal information
- Born: 13 October 1972 (age 53)

Sailing career
- Sport: Sailing
Medal record
Sailing
Representing Denmark
World Championships
Gold medal – first place	2015 Middelfart	Match racing

Lotte Meldgaard Pedersen (born 13 October 1972) is a Danish Olympic sailor competing in match racing. She won the 2015 ISAF Women's Match Racing World Championship.
