= Anna Östling =

Swedish yacht racer

Personal information
- Born: Anna Elisabeth Kjellberg; 14 February 1984 (age 42) Lerum, Sweden

Sailing career
- Sport: Sailing
- Club: Royal Gothenburg Yacht Club
Medal record
Sailing
Representing Sweden
World Championships
Gold medal – first place	2014 Cork	Match racing
Gold medal – first place	2016 Sheboygan	Match racing
Bronze medal – third place	2021 Cherbourg	Match racing
Silver medal – second place	2023 Middelfart	Match racing
Bronze medal – third place	2024 Jeddah	Match racing

Anna Elisabeth Östling (born 14 February 1984) is a Swedish Olympic sailor competing in match racing. She finished 12th in the Elliott 6m event at the 2012 Summer Olympics together with Malin Källström and Lotta Harrysson. She won the ISAF Women's Match Racing World Championship in 2014 and 2016.
