= Sailing at the 2012 Summer Olympics – Qualification =

75% of the qualification places for Sailing at the 2012 Summer Olympics were awarded based on results at the 2011 ISAF Sailing World Championships, and the remaining 25% at the World Championships for each boat class.

== Qualification timeline ==
Event	Date	Venue
2011 ISAF Sailing World Championships	Dec 3–18, 2011	(Australia) Perth
2012 Elliott 6m Qualification Event	February 1 – 5, 2012	(United States) Key Biscayne
2012 RS:X World Championships	Mar 20–28, 2012	(Spain) Cádiz
2012 Laser World Championship	May 4 – 10, 2012	(Germany) Boltenhagen
2012 49er World Championship	May 4 – 13, 2012	(Croatia) Zadar
2012 Star World Championships	May 5 – 11, 2012	(France) Hyères
2012 470 World Championships	May 10 – 19, 2012	(Spain) Barcelona
2012 Finn Gold Cup	May 11 – 18, 2012	(United Kingdom) Falmouth
2012 Laser Radial World Championship	May 15 – 20, 2012	(Germany) Boltenhagen

== Qualification progress ==
Event	2011 ISAF World Championships	2012 Class Championships	Host country	Total
Men	2011 ISAF World Championships	2012 Class Championships	Host country	Total
Windsurfer (RS:X)	28	9	Great Britain	38
One-person dinghy (Laser)	35	12	Great Britain	48
Heavyweight one-person dinghy (Finn)	18	6	Great Britain	25
Two-person dinghy (470)	19	7	Great Britain	27
Skiff (49er)	14	5	Great Britain	20
Keelboat (Star)	11	4	Great Britain	16
Event	2011 ISAF World Championships	2012 Class Championships	Host country	Total
Women	2011 ISAF World Championships	2012 Class Championships	Host country	Total
Windsurfer (RS:X)	20	7	Great Britain	28
One-person dinghy (Laser Radial)	29	9	Great Britain	39
Two-person dinghy (470)	14	5	Great Britain	20
Match racing (Elliott 6m)	8	3	Great Britain	12

== Summary ==
Nation	Men						Women				Total	
Nation	RS:X	Laser	Finn	470	49er	Star	RS:X	Laser Radial	470	Elliott 6m	Boats	Athletes
Argentina	X	X		X			X	X	X		6	8
Australia		X	X	X	X		X	X	X	X	8	13
Austria		X	X	X	X				X		5	8
Belarus	X							X			2	2
Belgium		X					X	X			3	3
Bermuda					X						1	2
Brazil	X	X	X			X	X	X	X		7	9
Bulgaria	X						X				2	2
Canada	X	X	X	X	X	X	X	X			8	11
Chile		X		X							2	3
China	X	X	X	X			X	X	X		7	9
Chinese Taipei	X										1	1
Colombia	X	X									2	2
Cook Islands								X			1	1
Croatia	X	X	X	X	X	X		X	X		8	12
Cyprus	X	X									2	2
Czech Republic	X	X	X					X			4	4
Denmark	X	X	X		X	X		X	X	X	8	13
Egypt	X										1	1
Estonia	X	X	X				X	X			5	5
Finland		X	X	X	X		X	X		X	7	11
France	X	X	X	X	X	X	X	X	X	X	10	16
Germany	X	X		X	X	X	X	X	X		8	12
Great Britain	X	X	X	X	X	X	X	X	X	X	10	16
Greece	X	X	X	X	X	X	X	X			8	11
Guatemala		X						X			2	2
Hong Kong	X						X				2	2
Hungary	X	X					X				3	3
Independent Olympic Athletes								X			1	1
Ireland		X		X	X	X		X			5	8
Israel	X			X			X	X	X		5	7
Italy	X	X	X	X	X		X	X	X		8	11
Japan	X			X	X		X	X	X		6	9
South Korea	X	X		X							3	4
Kyrgyzstan		X									1	1
Lithuania	X	X						X			3	3
Malaysia		X									1	1
Mexico	X	X						X			3	3
Monaco		X									1	1
Montenegro		X									1	1
Netherlands	X	X	X	X				X	X	X	7	11
New Zealand	X	X	X	X	X	X		X	X	X	9	15
Norway	X	X				X	X	X			5	6
Peru								X			1	1
Poland	X	X	X		X	X	X	X	X		8	11
Portugal	X	X		X	X	X	X	X		X	8	13
Russia	X	X	X	X			X	X		X	7	10
Saint Lucia								X			1	1
Singapore		X						X			2	2
Slovenia		X	X						X		3	4
South Africa				X							1	2
Spain	X	X	X	X	X		X	X	X	X	9	14
Sweden		X	X	X	X	X		X	X	X	8	14
Switzerland	X			X		X		X			4	6
Thailand	X	X					X				3	3
Trinidad and Tobago		X									1	1
Tunisia		X									1	1
Turkey		X	X	X				X			4	5
Ukraine	X	X	X				X				4	4
Uruguay		X						X			2	2
United States	X	X	X	X	X	X	X	X	X	X	10	16
Venezuela	X	X									2	2
Virgin Islands		X						X			2	2
Total: 63 NOCs	38	49	24	27	20	16	26	41	20	12	277	388

== Men's events ==
=== Windsurfer – RS:X ===
#	Nation	Qualification Tournament	Place in Event	Sailor	Sailor at Games
1	Great Britain	Host Country	—N/a	—N/a	Nick Dempsey
2	Netherlands	2011 Worlds	1	Dorian van Rijsselberghe	Dorian van Rijsselberghe
3	Poland	2011 Worlds	2	Piotr Myszka	Przemysław Miarczyński
4	Israel	2011 Worlds	3	Nimrod Mashiah	Shahar Tzuberi
5	New Zealand	2011 Worlds	5	Tom Ashley	Jon-Paul Tobin
6	Greece	2011 Worlds	7	Byron Kokkalanis	Byron Kokkalanis
7	France	2011 Worlds	8	Julien Bontemps	Julien Bontemps
8	Spain	2011 Worlds	9	Iván Pastor	Iván Pastor
9	Portugal	2011 Worlds	10	João Rodrigues	João Rodrigues
10	Brazil	2011 Worlds	11	Ricardo Santos	Ricardo Santos
11	Canada	2011 Worlds	12	Zachary Plavsic	Zachary Plavsic
12	Germany	2011 Worlds	15	Toni Wilhelm	Toni Wilhelm
13	Cyprus	2011 Worlds	16	Andreas Cariolou	Andreas Cariolou
14	Switzerland	2011 Worlds	21	Richard Stauffacher	Richard Stauffacher
15	Ukraine	2011 Worlds	22	Maksym Oberemko	Maksym Oberemko
16	Argentina	2011 Worlds	23	Mariano Reutemann	Mariano Reutemann
17	China	2011 Worlds	24	Wang Aichen	Wang Aichen
18	South Korea	2011 Worlds	25	Lee Tae-hoon	Lee Tae-hoon
19	Japan	2011 Worlds	26	Makoto Tomizawa	Makoto Tomizawa
20	Hungary	2011 Worlds	28	Áron Gádorfalvi	Áron Gádorfalvi
21	Hong Kong	2011 Worlds	29	Ho Tsun Andy Leung	Ho Tsun Andy Leung
22	Croatia	2011 Worlds	30	Luka Mratović	Luka Mratović
23	Norway	2011 Worlds	33	Sebastian Wang-Hansen	Sebastian Wang-Hansen
24	Italy	2011 Worlds	36	Federico Esposito	Federico Esposito
25	Lithuania	2011 Worlds	37	Juozas Bernotas	Juozas Bernotas
26	United States	2011 Worlds	38	Robert Willis	Robert Willis
27	Russia	2011 Worlds	39	Dmitry Polishchuk	Dmitry Polishchuk
28	Mexico	2011 Worlds	42	David Mier	David Mier
–	Australia	2011 Worlds	43	Tim Gourlay	
29	Belarus	2012 Worlds	41	Mikalai Zhukavets	Mikalai Zhukavets
30	Czech Republic	2012 Worlds	52	Karel Lavický	Karel Lavický
31	Colombia	2012 Worlds	53	Santiago Grillo	Santiago Grillo
32	Thailand	2012 Worlds	56	Ek Boonsawad	Ek Boonsawad
33	Bulgaria	2012 Worlds	59	Yoan Kolev	Yoan Kolev
34	Venezuela	2012 Worlds	61	Daniel Flores	Daniel Flores
35	Estonia	2012 Worlds	62	Johannes Ahun	Johannes Ahun
36	Denmark	2012 Worlds	66	Sebastian Fleischer	Sebastian Fleischer
37	Chinese Taipei	2012 Worlds	70	Chang Hao	Chang Hao
38	Egypt	Unused Quotas	—N/a	—N/a	Ahmed Habash

=== One-person dinghy – Laser ===
#	Nation	Qualification Tournament	Place in Event	Sailor	Sailor at Games
1	Great Britain	Host Country	—N/a	—N/a	Paul Goodison
2	Australia	2011 Worlds	1	Tom Slingsby	Tom Slingsby
3	New Zealand	2011 Worlds	3	Andrew Murdoch	Andrew Murdoch
4	Germany	2011 Worlds	4	Simon Grotelüschen	Simon Grotelüschen
5	Austria	2011 Worlds	6	Andreas Geritzer	Andreas Geritzer
6	Sweden	2011 Worlds	8	Johan Wigforss	Rasmus Myrgren
7	Cyprus	2011 Worlds	10	Pavlos Kontides	Pavlos Kontides
8	Croatia	2011 Worlds	11	Tonči Stipanović	Tonči Stipanović
9	France	2011 Worlds	12	Jean-Baptiste Bernaz	Jean-Baptiste Bernaz
10	United States	2011 Worlds	14	Clayton Johnson	Rob Crane
11	Brazil	2011 Worlds	15	Bruno Fontes	Bruno Fontes
15	Argentina	2011 Worlds	18	Julio Alsogaray	Julio Alsogaray
19	South Korea	2011 Worlds	20	Ha Jee-min	Ha Jee-min
14	Canada	2011 Worlds	21	Chris Dold	David Wright
12	Poland	2011 Worlds	25	Karol Porozyński	Kacper Ziemiński
13	Netherlands	2011 Worlds	26	Rutger van Schaardenburg	Rutger van Schaardenburg
17	Greece	2011 Worlds	29	Antonios Bougiouris	Evangelos Cheimonas
23	Guatemala	2011 Worlds	32	Juan Ignacio Maegli	Juan Ignacio Maegli
–	Israel	2011 Worlds	38	Yuval Botzer	
16	Hungary	2011 Worlds	39	Zsombor Berecz	Zsombor Berecz
21	Spain	2011 Worlds	40	Javier Hernández	Javier Hernández
18	Chile	2011 Worlds	41	Matías del Solar	Matías del Solar
20	Estonia	2011 Worlds	42	Karl-Martin Rammo	Karl-Martin Rammo
22	Italy	2011 Worlds	45	Marco Gallo	Michele Regolo
24	Denmark	2011 Worlds	49	Thorbjørn Schierup	Thorbjørn Schierup
–	Switzerland	2011 Worlds	51	Guillaume Girod	
25	Uruguay	2011 Worlds	52	Alejandro Foglia	Alejandro Foglia
26	Virgin Islands	2011 Worlds	56	Cy Thompson	Cy Thompson
27	Russia	2011 Worlds	57	Igor Lisovenko	Igor Lisovenko
28	Belgium	2011 Worlds	62	Wannes Van Laer	Wannes Van Laer
29	Norway	2011 Worlds	64	Kristian Ruth	Kristian Ruth
30	Slovenia	2011 Worlds	67	Karlo Hmeljak	Karlo Hmeljak
31	Singapore	2011 Worlds	68	Scott Sydney	Colin Cheng
32	Finland	2011 Worlds	70	Fredrik Westman	Mattias Lindfors
33	Turkey	2011 Worlds	73	Mustafa Çakır	Mustafa Çakır
34	China	2011 Worlds	75	Shi Jian	Shi Jian
35	Portugal	2012 Worlds	22	Gustavo Lima	Gustavo Lima
36	Ireland	2012 Worlds	37	James Espey	James Espey
37	Lithuania	2012 Worlds	47	Rokas Milevičius	Rokas Milevičius
38	Tunisia	2012 Worlds	48	Youssef Akrout	Youssef Akrout
39	Ukraine	2012 Worlds	49	Valeriy Kudryashov	Valeriy Kudryashov
40	Thailand	2012 Worlds	51	Keerati Bualong	Keerati Bualong
41	Colombia	2012 Worlds	81	Andrey Quintero	Andrey Quintero
42	Venezuela	2012 Worlds	88	José Ruiz	José Ruiz
43	Czech Republic	2012 Worlds	89	Martin Trčka	Viktor Teplý
44	Malaysia	2012 Worlds	91	Khairulnizam Afendy	Khairulnizam Afendy
45	Trinidad and Tobago	2012 Worlds	92	Andrew Lewis	Andrew Lewis
46	Mexico	2012 Worlds	94	Ricardo Montemayor	Ricardo Montemayor
47	Monaco	Tripartite	—N/a	—N/a	Damien Desprat
48	Montenegro	Tripartite	—N/a	—N/a	Milivoj Dukić
49	Kyrgyzstan	Unused Quotas	—N/a	—N/a	Ilya Ignatiev

=== Heavyweight one-person dinghy – Finn ===
#	Nation	Qualification Tournament	Place in Event	Sailor	Sailor at Games
1	Great Britain	Host Country	—N/a	—N/a	Ben Ainslie
2	Netherlands	2011 Worlds	2	Pieter-Jan Postma	Pieter-Jan Postma
3	Denmark	2011 Worlds	4	Jonas Høgh Christensen	Jonas Høgh Christensen
4	Spain	2011 Worlds	5	Rafael Trujillo	Rafael Trujillo
5	France	2011 Worlds	6	Jonathan Lobert	Jonathan Lobert
6	Estonia	2011 Worlds	8	Deniss Karpak	Deniss Karpak
7	United States	2011 Worlds	9	Zach Railey	Zach Railey
8	Croatia	2011 Worlds	10	Ivan Kljaković Gašpić	Ivan Kljaković Gašpić
9	Finland	2011 Worlds	12	Tapio Nirkko	Tapio Nirkko
10	Slovenia	2011 Worlds	13	Vasilij Žbogar	Vasilij Žbogar
11	Sweden	2011 Worlds	14	Daniel Birgmark	Daniel Birgmark
12	Canada	2011 Worlds	16	Chris Cook	Greg Douglas
13	Australia	2011 Worlds	19	Brendan Casey	Brendan Casey
14	Greece	2011 Worlds	20	Ioannis Mitakis	Ioannis Mitakis
15	New Zealand	2011 Worlds	21	Dan Slater	Dan Slater
16	Ukraine	2011 Worlds	22	Oleksiy Borysov	Oleksiy Borysov
17	Italy	2011 Worlds	24	Filippo Baldassari	Filippo Baldassari
18	Brazil	2011 Worlds	32	Jorge Zarif	Jorge Zarif
19	Russia	2011 Worlds	33	Eduard Skornyakov	Eduard Skornyakov
20	Poland	2012 Worlds	6	Piotr Kula	Piotr Kula
–	Germany	2012 Worlds	20	Matthias Miller	
21	Austria	2012 Worlds	23	Florian Raudaschl	Florian Raudaschl
22	Czech Republic	2012 Worlds	24	Michael Maier	Michael Maier
23	Turkey	2012 Worlds	29	Alican Kaynar	Alican Kaynar
24	China	2012 Worlds	30	Gong Lei	Gong Lei

=== Two-person dinghy – 470 ===
#	Nation	Qualification Tournament	Place in Event	Sailors	Sailors at Games
1	Great Britain	Host Country	—N/a	—N/a	Luke Patience; Stuart Bithell
2	Australia	2011 Worlds	1	Mathew Belcher; Malcolm Page	Mathew Belcher; Malcolm Page
3	Croatia	2011 Worlds	3	Šime Fantela; Igor Marenić	Šime Fantela; Igor Marenić
4	Israel	2011 Worlds	4	Gideon Kliger; Eran Sela	Gideon Kliger; Eran Sela
5	France	2011 Worlds	5	Nicolas Charbonnier; Jérémie Mion	Pierre Leboucher; Vincent Garos
6	Greece	2011 Worlds	7	Panagiotis Mantis; Pavlos Kagialis	Panagiotis Kampouridis; Efstathios Papadopoulos
7	New Zealand	2011 Worlds	8	Paul Snow-Hansen; Jason Saunders	Paul Snow-Hansen; Jason Saunders
8	Spain	2011 Worlds	9	Onán Barreiros; Aarón Sarmiento	Onán Barreiros; Aarón Sarmiento
9	Sweden	2011 Worlds	11	Anton Dahlberg; Sebastian Östling	Anton Dahlberg; Sebastian Östling
10	United States	2011 Worlds	13	Stuart McNay; Graham Biehl	Stuart McNay; Graham Biehl
11	Germany	2011 Worlds	15	Ferdinand Gerz; Patrick Follmann	Ferdinand Gerz; Patrick Follmann
12	Japan	2011 Worlds	16	Tetsuya Matsunaga; Kimihiko Imamura	Ryunosuke Harada; Yugo Yoshida
13	Portugal	2011 Worlds	17	Álvaro Marinho; Miguel Nunes	Álvaro Marinho; Miguel Nunes
14	Netherlands	2011 Worlds	18	Sven Coster; Kalle Coster	Sven Coster; Kalle Coster
15	Argentina	2011 Worlds	20	Lucas Calabrese; Juan de la Fuente	Lucas Calabrese; Juan de la Fuente
16	Austria	2011 Worlds	21	Matthias Schmid; Florian Reichstädter	Matthias Schmid; Florian Reichstädter
17	Finland	2011 Worlds	22	Joonas Lindgren; Niklas Lindgren	Joonas Lindgren; Niklas Lindgren
18	Italy	2011 Worlds	24	Gabrio Zandonà; Pietro Zucchetti	Gabrio Zandonà; Pietro Zucchetti
19	Switzerland	2011 Worlds	26	Yannick Brauchli; Romuald Hausser	Yannick Brauchli; Romuald Hausser
20	China	2011 Worlds	28	Wang Weidong; Deng Daokun	Wang Weidong; Deng Daokun
21	Russia	2012 Worlds	15	Mikhail Sheremetyev; Maksim Sheremetyev	Mikhail Sheremetyev; Maksim Sheremetyev
22	South Korea	2012 Worlds	20	Park Gun-Woo; Cho Sung-min	Park Gun-woo; Cho Sung-Min
23	Canada	2012 Worlds	22	Luke Ramsay; Mike Leigh	Luke Ramsay; Mike Leigh
24	Turkey	2012 Worlds	23	Deniz Çınar; Ateş Çınar	Deniz Çınar; Ateş Çınar
25	Ireland	2012 Worlds	24	Gerald Owens; Scott Flanigan	Gerald Owens; Scott Flanigan
26	Chile	2012 Worlds	31	Benjamín Grez; Diego González	Benjamín Grez; Diego González
27	South Africa	2012 Worlds	32	Asenathi Jim; Roger Hudson	Asenathi Jim; Roger Hudson

=== Skiff – 49er ===
#	Nation	Qualification Tournament	Place at Event	Sailors	Sailors at Games
1	Great Britain	Host Country	—N/a	—N/a	Stevie Morrison; Ben Rhodes
2	Australia	2011 Worlds	1	Nathan Outteridge; Iain Jensen	Nathan Outteridge; Iain Jensen
3	New Zealand	2011 Worlds	2	Peter Burling; Blair Tuke	Peter Burling; Blair Tuke
4	Denmark	2011 Worlds	3	Emil Toft Nielsen; Simon Toft Nielsen	Allan Nørregaard; Peter Lang
5	Austria	2011 Worlds	7	Nico Delle-Karth; Nikolaus Resch	Nico Delle-Karth; Nikolaus Resch
6	United States	2011 Worlds	9	Erik Storck; Trevor Moore	Erik Storck; Trevor Moore
7	Ireland	2011 Worlds	10	Ryan Seaton; Matt McGovern	Ryan Seaton; Matt McGovern
8	Germany	2011 Worlds	11	Tobias Schadewaldt; Hannes Baumann	Tobias Schadewaldt; Hannes Baumann
9	Poland	2011 Worlds	12	Marcin Czajkowski; Jacek Piasecki	Łukasz Przybytek; Pawel Kolodzinski
10	France	2011 Worlds	15	Stéphane Christidis; Emmanuel Dyen	Stéphane Christidis; Emmanuel Dyen
11	Spain	2011 Worlds	16	Federico Alonso; Arturo Alonso	Iker Martínez; Xabier Fernández
12	Finland	2011 Worlds	19	Lauri Lehtinen; Kalle Bask	Lauri Lehtinen; Kalle Bask
13	Sweden	2011 Worlds	21	Charlie Enlund Ekberg; Kalle Torlén	Niclas Düring; Jonas von Geijer
14	Portugal	2011 Worlds	23	Bernardo Freitas; Francisco Andrade	Bernardo Freitas; Francisco Andrade
15	Croatia	2011 Worlds	25	Pavle Kostov; Petar Cupać	Pavle Kostov; Petar Cupać
16	Bermuda	2012 Worlds	9	Jesse Kirkland; Alexander Kirkland	Jesse Kirkland; Alexander Kirkland
17	Italy	2012 Worlds	16	Pietro Sibello; Gianfranco Sibello	Giuseppe Angilella; Gianfranco Sibello
18	Canada	2012 Worlds	21	Gordon Cook; Hunter Lowden	Gordon Cook; Hunter Lowden
19	Greece	2012 Worlds	22	Dionisios Dimou; Michail Pateniotis	Dionisios Dimou; Michail Pateniotis
20	Japan	2012 Worlds	23	Yukio Makino; Kenji Takahashi	Yukio Makino; Kenji Takahashi

=== Keelboat – Star ===
#	Nation	Qualification Tournament	Place in Event	Sailors	Sailors at Games
1	Great Britain	Host Country	—N/a	—N/a	Iain Percy; Andrew Simpson
2	Brazil	2011 Worlds	1	Robert Scheidt; Bruno Prada	Robert Scheidt; Bruno Prada
3	Germany	2011 Worlds	2	Robert Stanjek; Frithjof Kleen	Robert Stanjek; Frithjof Kleen
4	United States	2011 Worlds	3	Mark Mendelblatt; Brian Fatih	Mark Mendelblatt; Brian Fatih
5	Poland	2011 Worlds	4	Mateusz Kusznierewicz; Dominik Życki	Mateusz Kusznierewicz; Dominik Życki
6	Sweden	2011 Worlds	5	Fredrik Lööf; Max Salminen	Fredrik Lööf; Max Salminen
7	Norway	2011 Worlds	6	Eivind Melleby; Petter Mørland Pedersen	Eivind Melleby; Petter Mørland Pedersen
8	France	2011 Worlds	7	Xavier Rohart; Pierre-Alexis Ponsot	Xavier Rohart; Pierre-Alexis Ponsot
9	Canada	2011 Worlds	10	Richard Clarke; Tyler Bjorn	Richard Clarke; Tyler Bjorn
10	Ireland	2011 Worlds	12	Peter O'Leary; David Burrows	Peter O'Leary; David Burrows
11	Portugal	2011 Worlds	13	Afonso Domingos; Frederico Melo	Afonso Domingos; Frederico Melo
12	Switzerland	2011 Worlds	16	Flavio Marazzi; Enrico De Maria	Flavio Marazzi; Enrico De Maria
13	Denmark	2012 Worlds	3	Michael Hestbæk; Claus Olesen	Michael Hestbæk; Claus Olesen
14	New Zealand	2012 Worlds	7	Hamish Pepper; Jim Turner	Hamish Pepper; Jim Turner
15	Greece	2012 Worlds	8	Aimilios Papathanasiou; Antonis Tsotras	Aimilios Papathanasiou; Antonis Tsotras
16	Croatia	2012 Worlds	12	Marin Lovrović Jr. Dan Lovrović	Marin Lovrović Jr. Dan Lovrović

== Women's events ==
=== Windsurfer – RS:X ===
#	Nation	Qualification Tournament	Place in Event	Sailor	Sailor at Games
1	Great Britain	Host Country	—N/a	—N/a	Bryony Shaw
2	Israel	2011 Worlds	1	Lee Korzits	Lee Korzits
3	Poland	2011 Worlds	2	Zofia Noceti-Klepacka	Zofia Noceti-Klepacka
4	Spain	2011 Worlds	3	Marina Alabau	Marina Alabau
5	China	2011 Worlds	4	Huang Yue	Li Ling
6	France	2011 Worlds	5	Charline Picon	Charline Picon
7	Italy	2011 Worlds	9	Laura Linares	Alessandra Sensini
8	Ukraine	2011 Worlds	10	Olha Maslivets	Olha Maslivets
9	Germany	2011 Worlds	14	Moana Delle	Moana Delle
10	Canada	2011 Worlds	15	Nikola Girke	Nikola Girke
14	Finland	2011 Worlds	16	Tuuli Petäjä	Tuuli Petäjä
10	Australia	2011 Worlds	17	Jessica Crisp	Jessica Crisp
15	Hong Kong	2011 Worlds	21	Hei Man Hayley Chan	Hei Man Hayley Chan
11	Norway	2011 Worlds	23	Jannicke Stålstrøm	Jannicke Stålstrøm
–	New Zealand	2011 Worlds	26	Steff Williams	
17	Bulgaria	2011 Worlds	28	Irina Konstantinova-Bontemps	Irina Konstantinova-Bontemps
13	Brazil	2011 Worlds	29	Patrícia Freitas	Patrícia Freitas
16	Belgium	2011 Worlds	30	Sigrid Rondelez	Sigrid Rondelez
18	Japan	2011 Worlds	33	Yuki Sunaga	Yuki Sunaga
19	Greece	2011 Worlds	36	Angeliki Skarlatou	Angeliki Skarlatou
20	Hungary	2011 Worlds	39	Diána Detre	Diána Detre
–	Netherlands	2012 Worlds	32	Lilian De Geus	
21	United States	2012 Worlds	40	Farrah Hall	Farrah Hall
22	Argentina	2012 Worlds	42	Jazmín López Becker	Jazmín López Becker
23	Russia	2012 Worlds	44	Tatiana Bazyuk	Tatiana Bazyuk
24	Estonia	2012 Worlds	48	Ingrid Puusta	Ingrid Puusta
25	Thailand	2012 Worlds	49	Napalai Tansai	Napalai Tansai
26	Portugal	2012 Worlds	52	Carolina Mendelblatt	Carolina Mendelblatt

=== One-person dinghy – Laser Radial ===
#	Nation	Qualification Tournament	Place in QT	Sailor	Sailor at Games
1	Great Britain	Host Country	—N/a	—N/a	Alison Young
2	Netherlands	2011 Worlds	1	Marit Bouwmeester	Marit Bouwmeester
3	Belgium	2011 Worlds	2	Evi Van Acker	Evi Van Acker
4	United States	2011 Worlds	3	Paige Railey	Paige Railey
5	Czech Republic	2011 Worlds	4	Veronika Fenclová	Veronika Fenclová
6	Lithuania	2011 Worlds	5	Gintarė Scheidt	Gintarė Scheidt
7	Ireland	2011 Worlds	6	Annalise Murphy	Annalise Murphy
8	Belarus	2011 Worlds	8	Tatiana Drozdovskaya	Tatiana Drozdovskaya
9	Finland	2011 Worlds	9	Sari Multala	Sari Multala
10	New Zealand	2011 Worlds	10	Sara Winther	Sara Winther
11	Switzerland	2011 Worlds	12	Nathalie Brugger	Nathalie Brugger
12	Sweden	2011 Worlds	13	Josefin Olsson	Josefin Olsson
13	Denmark	2011 Worlds	14	Anne-Marie Rindom	Anne-Marie Rindom
14	Germany	2011 Worlds	18	Lisa Fasselt	Franziska Goltz
15	Australia	2011 Worlds	19	Krystal Weir	Krystal Weir
16	France	2011 Worlds	21	Sophie de Turckheim	Sarah Steyaert
17	Italy	2011 Worlds	24	Francesca Clapcich	Francesca Clapcich
18	China	2011 Worlds	25	Xu Lijia	Xu Lijia
19	Spain	2011 Worlds	27	Alicia Cebrián	Alicia Cebrián
20	Argentina	2011 Worlds	31	Cecilia Carranza Saroli	Cecilia Carranza Saroli
21	Croatia	2011 Worlds	32	Tina Mihelić	Tina Mihelić
22	Mexico	2011 Worlds	35	Tania Elías Calles	Tania Elías Calles
23	Canada	2011 Worlds	36	Isabella Bertold	Danielle Dube
24	Brazil	2011 Worlds	41	Adriana Kostiw	Adriana Kostiw
25	Israel	2011 Worlds	43	Nufar Edelman	Nufar Edelman
26	Turkey	2011 Worlds	44	Nazli Çagla Dönertas	Nazli Çagla Dönertas
27	Singapore	2011 Worlds	53	Elizabeth Yue Ling Yin	Elizabeth Yue Ling Yin
28	Portugal	2011 Worlds	54	Sara Carmo	Sara Carmo
29	Japan	2011 Worlds	57	Kanako Hiruta	Manami Doi
30	Norway	2011 Worlds	58	Marthe Enger Eide	Marthe Enger Eide
31	Russia	2012 Worlds	25	Svetlana Shnitko	Svetlana Shnitko
32	Poland	2012 Worlds	32	Anna Weinzieher	Anna Weinzieher
33	Independent Olympic Athletes	2012 Worlds	37	Philipine van Aanholt	Philipine van Aanholt
34	Guatemala	2012 Worlds	46	Andrea Aldana	Andrea Aldana
35	Uruguay	2012 Worlds	57	Andrea Foglia	Andrea Foglia
36	Greece	2012 Worlds	65	Anna Agrafioti	Anna Agrafioti
37	Estonia	2012 Worlds	71	Anna Pohlak	Anna Pohlak
38	Virgin Islands	2012 Worlds	73	Mayumi Roller	Mayumi Roller
39	Peru	2012 Worlds	74	Paloma Schmidt	Paloma Schmidt
40	Cook Islands	Tripartite	—N/a	—N/a	Helema Williams
41	Saint Lucia	Tripartite	—N/a	—N/a	Beth Lygoe

=== Two-person dinghy – 470 ===
#	Nation	Qualification Tournament	Place in Event	Sailors	Sailors at Games
1	Great Britain	Host Country	—N/a	—N/a	Hannah Mills; Saskia Clark
2	Spain	2011 Worlds	1	Tara Pacheco; Berta Betanzos	Tara Pacheco; Berta Betanzos
3	New Zealand	2011 Worlds	3	Jo Aleh; Polly Powrie	Jo Aleh; Polly Powrie
4	Israel	2011 Worlds	4	Gil Cohen; Vered Buskila	Gil Cohen; Vered Buskila
5	Italy	2011 Worlds	5	Giulia Conti; Giovanna Micol	Giulia Conti; Giovanna Micol
6	Japan	2011 Worlds	6	Ai Kondo; Wakako Tabata	Ai Kondo; Wakako Tabata
7	Brazil	2011 Worlds	8	Martine Soffiatti Grael; Isabel Swan	Fernanda Oliveira; Ana Barbachan
8	Australia	2011 Worlds	9	Elise Rechichi; Belinda Stowell	Elise Rechichi; Belinda Stowell
9	Netherlands	2011 Worlds	10	Lisa Westerhof; Lobke Berkhout	Lisa Westerhof; Lobke Berkhout
10	France	2011 Worlds	11	Ingrid Petitjean; Nadège Douroux	Camille Lecointre; Mathilde Géron
11	United States	2011 Worlds	12	Amanda Clark; Sarah Lihan	Amanda Clark; Sarah Lihan
12	Sweden	2011 Worlds	16	Lisa Ericson; Astrid Gabrielsson	Lisa Ericson; Astrid Gabrielsson
13	Argentina	2011 Worlds	17	María Fernanda Sesto; Consuelo Monsegur	María Fernanda Sesto; Consuelo Monsegur
14	Slovenia	2011 Worlds	19	Tina Mrak; Teja Černe	Tina Mrak; Teja Černe
15	Germany	2011 Worlds	20	Tina Lutz; Susann Beucke	Kathrin Kadelbach; Friederike Belcher
16	Denmark	2012 Worlds	7	Henriette Koch; Lene Sommer	Henriette Koch; Lene Sommer
17	China	2012 Worlds	15	Wang Xiaoli; Huang Xufeng	Wang Xiaoli; Huang Xufeng
18	Poland	2012 Worlds	21	Agnieszka Skrzypulec; Jolanta Ogar	Agnieszka Skrzypulec; Jolanta Ogar
19	Croatia	2012 Worlds	24	Enia Ninčević; Romana Župan	Enia Ninčević; Romana Župan
20	Austria	2012 Worlds	25	Lara Vadlau; Eva-Maria Schimak	Lara Vadlau; Eva-Maria Schimak

=== Match racing – Elliott 6m ===
#	Nation	Qualification Tournament	Place in QT	Sailors	Sailors at Games
1	Great Britain	Host Country	—N/a	—N/a	Lucy MacGregor; Annie Lush; Kate MacGregor
2	United States	2011 Worlds	1	Anna Tunnicliffe; Deborah Capozzi; Molly Vandemoer	Anna Tunnicliffe; Deborah Capozzi; Molly Vandemoer
3	France	2011 Worlds	3	Claire Leroy; Élodie Bertrand; Marie Riou	Claire Leroy; Élodie Bertrand; Marie Riou
4	Russia	2011 Worlds	4	Ekaterina Skudina; Elena Siuzeva; Elena Oblova	Ekaterina Skudina; Elena Siuzeva; Elena Oblova
5	Australia	2011 Worlds	5	Olivia Price; Nina Curtis; Lucinda Whitty	Olivia Price; Nina Curtis; Lucinda Whitty
6	Sweden	2011 Worlds	6	Anna Kjellberg; Malin Källström; Lotta Harrysson	Anna Kjellberg; Malin Källström; Lotta Harrysson
7	Netherlands	2011 Worlds	7	Mandy Mulder; Merel Witteveen; Annemiek Bekkering	Annemieke Bes; Marcelien de Koning; Renee Groeneveld
8	New Zealand	2011 Worlds	9	Stephanie Hazard; Jenna Hansen; Susannah Pyatt	Stephanie Hazard; Jenna Hansen; Susannah Pyatt
9	Portugal	2011 Worlds	11	Rita Gonvalves; Diana Neves; Mariana Lobato	Rita Gonvalves; Diana Neves; Mariana Lobato
10	Finland	2012 Qualifier	1	Silja Lehtinen; Mikaela Wulff; Silja Kanerva	Silja Lehtinen; Mikaela Wulff; Silja Kanerva
11	Spain	2012 Qualifier	2	Támara Echegoyen; Ángela Pumariega; Sofía Toro	Támara Echegoyen; Ángela Pumariega; Sofía Toro
12	Denmark	2012 Qualifier	3	Lotte Meldgaard Pedersen; Susanne Boidin; Tina Schmidt Gramkov	Lotte Meldgaard Pedersen; Susanne Boidin; Tina Schmidt Gramkov
