= 2011 ISAF Sailing World Championships – 49er =

49er at the 2011 ISAF Sailing World Championships
- Venue: Perth, Western Australia
- Dates: 12–18 December
- Competitors: 134 from 29 nations

Medalists
gold medal	Nathan Outteridge; Iain Jensen	Australia
silver medal	Peter Burling; Blair Tuke	New Zealand
bronze medal	Emil Toft Nielsen; Simon Toft Nielsen	Denmark

The 49er class at the 2011 ISAF Sailing World Championships was held in Perth, Western Australia between 12 and 18 December 2011.

== Results ==
Results of individual races
Pos	Crew	Country	I	II	III	IV	V	VI	VII	VIII	IX	X	XI	XII	XIII	XIV	XV	MR	Tot	Pts
Gold medal	Nathan Outteridge; Iain Jensen	Australia	10	10	1	1	1	13^{†}	8	5	4	10	5	8	5	7	10	6	104	91
Silver medal	Peter Burling; Blair Tuke	New Zealand	5	3	2	16^{†}	6	6	3	12	3	16	11	5	9	15	12	4	128	112
Bronze medal	Emil Toft Nielsen; Simon Toft Nielsen	Denmark	OCS 35^{†}	2	3	2	2	19	6	4	1	1	13	17	6	9	17	10	147	112
4	John Pink; Rick Peacock	Great Britain	3	1	16	4	12	4	1	6	2	4	9	15	22	6	23^{†}	18	146	123
5	Allan Nørregaard; Peter Lang	Denmark	12	11	4	8	1	6	6	7	24^{†}	18	1	11	18	3	21	2	153	129
6	David Evans; Edward Powys	Great Britain	1	7	11	9	2	8	9	1	10	22^{†}	7	20	16	16	9	8	156	134
7	Nico Delle Karth; Nikolaus Resch	Austria	8	5	8	12	10	15	12	18	12	12	22^{†}	1	1	8	1	14	159	137
8	Jonas Warrer; Søren Hansen	Denmark	1	4	5	3	8	10	13	9	5	23	24	10	DSQ 26^{†}	4	7	12	164	138
9	Erik Storch; Trevor Moore	United States	8	6	14	1	3	3	15	20^{†}	14	9	6	3	15	11	DNF 22	8	158	138
10	Ryan Seaton; Matt McGovern	Ireland	2	4	10	7	11	12	5	5	19^{†}	8	17	12	14	10	6	16	158	139
11	Erik Heil; Thomas Plößel	Germany	11	2	6	13	16	7	1	9	8	5	15	6	23^{†}	14	19	–	155	132
12	Marcin Czajkowski; Jacek Piasecki	Poland	RDG 12.3	9	10	15	10	16	16	10	7	3	3	4	13	25^{†}	4	–	157.3	132.3
13	Tobias Schadewaldt; Hannes Baumann	Germany	4	7	1	7	12	4	14	2	13	7	23	22	17	24^{†}	2	–	159	135
14	Will Phillips; Sam Phillips	Australia	4	DSQ 35^{†}	12	9	7	2	20	1	11	14	18	21	10	5	3	–	172	137
15	Yann Rocherieux; Mathieu Frei	France	OCS 35^{†}	8	7	6	7	13	8	3	25	2	25	25	2	1	14	–	181	146
16	Federico Alonso; Arturo Alonso	Spain	7	12	11	11	4	11	2	10	21^{†}	13	8	19	7	17	16	–	169	148
17	Dylan Fletcher; Alain Sign	Great Britain	5	3	15	20^{†}	3	9	16	3	17	15	4	18	4	19	18	–	169	149
18	Stéphane Christidis; Emmanuel Dyen	France	13	1	8	3	19	1	5	4	20	19	12	7	DSQ 26^{†}	12	OCS 26	–	176	150
19	Lauri Lehtinen; Kalle Bask	Finland	6	9	7	10	4	7	17	2	23^{†}	11	21	16	11	21	11	–	176	153
20	Noé Delpech; Julien d'Ortoli	France	14	22	2	BFD 35^{†}	17	8	4	8	6	24	14	9	3	2	24	–	192	157
21	Charlie Enlund Ekberg; Kalle Torlén	Sweden	3	18	3	19	13	3	2	25^{†}	9	21	2	24	12	23	13	–	190	165
22	Peter Kruger Andersen; Nicolai Thorsell	Denmark	2	6	4	20	5	1	23^{†}	16	16	20	20	2	20	13	22	–	190	167
23	Bernardo Freitas; Francisco Andrade	Portugal	17	RDG 13.6	6	11	15	19	21^{†}	6	15	6	16	13	19	18	5	–	200.6	179.6
24	Lennart Briesenick Pudenz; Morten Massmann	Germany	9	5	5	5	5	18	18	16	18	25^{†}	10	23	21	22	15	–	215	190
25	Pavle Kostov; Petar Cupać	Croatia	14	10	12	14	16	16	12	11	22^{†}	17	19	14	8	20	20	–	225	203
26	Jorge Lima; Jose Luis Costa	Portugal	25	16	13	10	8	10	27^{†}	13	3	5	5	1	3	3	OCS 22	–	164	137
27	Steve Thomas; Jaspar Warrer	Australia	13	25	15	4	14	28^{†}	9	15	8	2	16	7	12	15	6	–	189	161
28	Thomas Zajac; Thomas Czajka	Austria	12	18	13	5	17	9	21	21	1	4	8	14	5	14	OCS 22^{†}	–	184	162
29	Jonas von Geijer; Niclas Düring	Sweden	17	23	9	14	9	15	29^{†}	26	5	9	11	8	10	5	1	–	191	162
30	Yukio Makino; Kenji Takahashi	Japan	11	21	DNF 35^{†}	16	14	31	7	12	7	7	OCS 22	15	1	7	2	–	208	173
31	Pavel Kalinchev; Pavel Karachov	Russia	9	14	DNF 35^{†}	13	23	5	24	22	2	12	6	OCS 22	7	9	10	–	213	178
32	Marcus Hansen; Josh Porebski	New Zealand	DNC 35^{†}	13	18	17	11	5	19	29	16	3	7	11	11	10	8	–	213	178
33	Carl P. Sylvan; Otto Hamel	Sweden	20	12	27^{†}	8	15	24	23	24	6	6	2	10	6	11	12	–	206	179
34	Carlos Paz; Antón Paz	Spain	6	11	20	23	26^{†}	17	26	18	4	19	10	6	4	2	14	–	206	180
35	Gordon Cook; Hunter Lowden	Canada	16	17	17	17	6	18	24	27^{†}	11	14	1	4	15	16	5	–	208	181
36	Niels Joachim Gormsen; Anders Thomsen	Denmark	21	DNC 35^{†}	16	19	19	20	7	23	18	1	3	2	OCS 22	1	11	–	218	183
37	Jonathan Ladha; Daniel Inkpen	Canada	18	19	18	15	21	2	25^{†}	11	17	13	18	3	8	17	9	–	214	189
38	Ruggero Tita; Gianfranco Sibello	Italy	OCS 35^{†}	RAF 35	9	6	DNF 35	DSQ 35	4	8	14	10	4	9	17	4	7	–	232	197
39	Santiago Silveira; Philipp Umpierre	Uruguay	15	19	22	2	28	22	11	OCS 35^{†}	12	11	15	18	9	20	3	–	242	207
40	Yannick Lefèbvre; Matthieu Janssens	Belgium	24	21	22	21	13	30^{†}	10	21	9	15	13	20	2	8	13	–	242	212
41	Jacopo Plazzi; Umberto Milineris	Italy	OCS 35	17	17	23	18	17	19	23	13	21	9	12	19	6	4	–	253	218
42	Jonathan Bay; Christopher Thorsell	Denmark	10	20	14	25^{†}	25	12	22	15	DSQ 22	8	14	13	16	19	17	–	252	227
43	Luis Felipe Herman; Pablo Herman	Chile	19	15	OCS 35^{†}	25	18	23	14	22	10	17	12	5	14	13	DSQ 22	–	264	229
44	Jonny Goldsberry; Charlie Smythe	United States	22	15	19	DNF 35^{†}	22	21	3	14	15	16	17	17	18	21	DNF 22	–	277	242
45	David Gilmour; Nick Brownie	Australia	23	29^{†}	24	29	9	14	10	17	19	18	OCS 22	16	20	12	15	–	277	248
46	Jorge Xavier Murrieta; Alejandro Murrieta	Mexico	32	20	20	18	26	DNC 35^{†}	11	7	DSQ 22	20	OCS 22	19	13	18	16	–	299	264
47	Dionisios Dimou; Michail Pateniotis	Greece	20	16	19	BFD 35^{†}	20	23	18	20	5	7	5	4	4	4	7	–	207	172
48	Tom Johnson; Rhys Mara	Australia	29^{†}	27	23	22	25	11	13	25	6	1	8	5	2	3	6	–	206	177
49	Billy Gooderham; Ian Hogan	Canada	18	26	DNF 35^{†}	12	21	26	25	13	7	4	1	12	13	2	1	–	216	181
50	Jesse Kirkland; Alexander Kirkland	Bermuda	15	14	DNF 35^{†}	24	30	21	17	19	DNF 22	15	4	1	1	1	2	–	221	186
51	André Fonseca; Marco Grael	Brazil	26	8	RAF 35^{†}	DNF 35	DNS 35	14	20	14	1	3	2	6	10	6	15	–	230	195
52	Tomás Wagmaister; Juan Martín Correa	Argentina	30	25	DNF 35^{†}	24	23	25	28	19	3	5	6	3	3	9	3	–	241	206
53	Tonis Haavel; Lenart Kivistuk	Estonia	16	24	21	27	22	26	26	30^{†}	OCS 22	9	3	2	7	5	4	–	244	214
54	Robbie Gibbs; Jamie Woods	Australia	19	DNF 35^{†}	DNC 35	18	24	28	15	17	8	2	7	14	8	16	5	–	251	216
55	Alexey Chekrygin; Vitaly Russu	Russia	28	31^{†}	25	26	20	24	30	26	2	6	DNF 22	7	5	11	8	–	271	240
56	Matthieu Dubreucq; Tej Trevor Parekh	Canada	22	22	OCS 35^{†}	30	29	25	28	27	OCS 22	8	10	9	6	10	11	–	294	259
57	Peter Kendall; Bryce Waters	Australia	27	26	26	BFD 35^{†}	30	22	27	28	10	10	12	8	9	8	16	–	294	259
58	Robert Frost; Tom Arbuckle	Canada	21	30	23	28	24	27	31^{†}	30	4	13	9	11	16	15	9	–	291	260
59	Adam Glaskin; James Loughridge	Australia	DNC 35^{†}	30	DNF 35	21	27	20	31	28	9	12	13	13	15	7	14	–	310	275
60	Matthew Rickard; Andy Tarboton	South Africa	DSQ 35^{†}	23	DNF 35	27	28	30	22	31	DNC 22	11	11	15	14	13	10	–	327	292
61	Marcus Spillane; Rory Fitpatrick	Ireland	33	24	DNF 35^{†}	31	27	27	32	29	11	14	16	18	12	12	13	–	334	299
62	Chris Burgess; Rowan Swanson	New Zealand	25	28	DNC 35^{†}	22	29	29	33	24	12	18	15	16	17	17	17	–	337	302
63	Matthew Jahn; Guy Naylor	Australia	31	28	DNF 35^{†}	28	DNF 35	29	29	32	13	16	17	10	DNS 22	18	12	–	355	320
64	Duncan Head; Marty Sale	Australia	24	27	DNC 35^{†}	26	31	DNF 35	30	31	14	17	14	17	DNS 22	14	18	–	355	320
65	Stevie Morrison; Ben Rhodes	Great Britain	7	13	21	DNS 35	DNS 35	DNS 35	DNC 35	DNC 35	DNC 22	DNC 22	DNC 22	DNC 22	DNC 22	DNC 22	DNC 22	–	370	335
66	Sean Carr; Luke Smith	Australia	23	29	DNF 35^{†}	32	31	32	32	32	DNC 22	19	18	19	11	19	19	–	373	338
67	Daniel Robert; Andrew Gllies	Australia	DNC 35^{†}	DNF 35	DNC 35	DNC 35	DNC 35	DNC 35	DNC 35	DNC 35	DNC 22	DNC 22	DNC 22	DNC 22	DNC 22	DNC 22	DNC 22	–	434	399

Legend: – Qualified for medal race(s); BFD – Black flag disqualification; DNC – Did not come to the starting area; DNF – Did not finish; DNS – Did not start; DSQ – Disqualified; OCS – On the course side of the starting line; RAF – Retired after finishing; RDG – Redress given; † – Discarded race not counted in the overall result;
