= 2011 ISAF Sailing World Championships – Women's 470 =

Women's 470 at the 2011 ISAF Sailing World Championships
- Venue: Perth, Western Australia
- Dates: 12–18 December
- Competitors: 96 from 28 nations

Medalists
gold medal	Tara Pacheco; Berta Betanzos	Spain
silver medal	Hannah Mills; Saskia Clark	Great Britain
bronze medal	Aleh; Polly Powrie	New Zealand

The Women's 470 class at the 2011 ISAF Sailing World Championships was held in Perth, Western Australia between 12 and 18 December 2011.

== Results ==
Results of individual races
Pos	Helmsman	Country	I	II	III	IV	V	VI	VII	VIII	IX	X	MR	Tot	Pts
Gold medal	Tara Pacheco; Berta Betanzos	Spain	8	7	1	1	3	4	27^{†}	7	2	16	14	90	63
Silver medal	Hannah Mills; Saskia Clark	Great Britain	10	6	9	6	13^{†}	3	12	8	11	1	2	81	68
Bronze medal	Jo Aleh; Polly Powrie	New Zealand	7	4	14	25^{†}	7	1	3	17	1	13	6	98	73
4	Gil Cohen; Vered Buskila	Israel	24^{†}	5	17	2	1	8	10	4	9	4	16	100	76
5	Giulia Conti; Giovanna Micol	Italy	11	8	2	7	23	35^{†}	6	1	4	8	18	123	88
6	Ai Kondo; Wakako Tabata	Japan	3	1	13	4	2	28^{†}	5	16	15	10	20	117	89
7	Penny Clark; Katrina Hughes	Great Britain	1	10	3	9	25	10	7	30^{†}	17	2	10	124	94
8	Martine Grael; Isabel Swan	Brazil	5	11	16	20^{†}	16	20	1	2	12	3	12	118	98
9	Elise Rechichi; Belinda Stowell	Australia	23	38^{†}	12	14	8	9	15	10	3	5	4	141	103
10	Lisa Westerhof; Lobke Berkhout	Netherlands	4	2	11	3	9	31	28	DSQ 49^{†}	6	6	8	157	108
11	Ingrid Petitjean; Nadège Douroux	France	26	9	7	17	4	32^{†}	4	6	18	18	–	141	109
12	Amanda Clark; Sarah Lihan	United States	12	3	15	16	33^{†}	27	13	5	7	14	–	145	112
13	Camille Lecointre; Mathilde Géron	France	19^{†}	14	8	5	15	11	9	14	19	19	–	133	114
14	Yuka Yoshisako; Noriko Okuma	Japan	35^{†}	22	5	28	14	18	2	9	8	15	–	156	121
15	Erin Maxwell; Isabelle Kinsolving	United States	28^{†}	28	6	19	5	12	16	20	16	17	–	167	139
16	Lisa Ericson; Astrid Gabrielsson	Sweden	16	12	22	21	20	13	8	29^{†}	22	7	–	170	141
17	María Fernanda Sesto; Consuelo Monsegur	Argentina	9	13	29^{†}	26	17	15	19	23	14	12	–	177	148
18	Sophie Weguelin; Sophie Ainsworth	Great Britain	27^{†}	21	10	8	10	22	17	24	24	22	–	185	158
19	Tina Mrak; Teja Černe	Slovenia	22	29	27	32	12	2	33^{†}	26	5	11	–	199	166
20	Tina Lutz; Susann Beucke	Germany	6	30	4	15	11	33	34	25	DNF 49^{†}	9	–	216	167
21	Henriette Koch; Lene Sommer	Denmark	13	18	24	30	35^{†}	19	11	3	23	28	–	204	169
22	Xu Xiaomei; Yu Chunyan	China	25	16	21	24	28^{†}	5	18	21	26	25	–	209	181
23	Natalia Ivanova; Diana Krutskikh	Russia	2	15	40	12	41^{†}	17	14	33	39	30	–	243	202
24	Virginia Kravarioti; Olga Tsigaridi	Greece	21	19	32	10	21	26	22	31	20	34^{†}	–	236	202
25	Ingrid Söderström; Linnea Wennergren	Sweden	20	20	18	22	40^{†}	36	20	11	28	27	–	242	202
26	Fernanda Oliveira; Ana Barbachan	Brazil	29	33	31	13	34^{†}	25	29	13	10	26	–	243	209
27	Hélène Defrance; Emmanuelle Rol	France	15	32	23	27	24	14	38^{†}	19	30	33	–	255	217
28	Kathrin Kadelbach; Friederike Belcher	Germany	BFD 49^{†}	25	25	11	6	29	25	35	40	29	–	274	225
29	Wang Xiaoli; Huang Xufeng	China	18	37	26	18	BFD 49^{†}	30	26	22	25	23	–	274	225
30	Afrodite Kyranakou; Jeske Kisters	Netherlands	31	26	28	23	BFD 49^{†}	38	23	12	43	21	–	294	245
31	Agnieszka Skrzypulec; Jolanta Ogar	Poland	39^{†}	31	37	31	26	21	32	RDG 31	13	24	–	285	246
32	Lara Vadlau; Eva-Maria Schimak	Austria	17	40^{†}	19	37	32	34	30	18	32	36	–	295	255
33	Enia Ninčević; Romana Župan	Croatia	14	35	38	34	22	42^{†}	24	15	38	38	–	300	258
34	Nina Keijzer; Anneloes van Veen	Netherlands	30	27	42	36	BFD 49^{†}	23	21	32	27	20	–	307	258
35	Anastasiia Kolomiiets; Oleksandra Chycherova	Ukraine	34	36	33	33	19	6	39^{†}	27	34	39	–	300	261
36	Yang Gao; Cai Liping	China	38	23	30	BFD 49^{†}	18	24	35	34	36	32	–	319	270
37	Feng Huimin; Huang Lizhu	China	40	OCS 49^{†}	39	38	36	7	31	36	21	31	–	328	279
38	Stephanie Hasler; Romy Hasler	Switzerland	37	24	35	29	27	48^{†}	37	40	29	40	–	346	298
39	Vladelina Ilyenko; Nataliya Gaponovich	Russia	45^{†}	34	34	35	29	39	36	28	31	37	–	348	303
40	Sasha Ryan; Chelsea Hall	Australia	33	17	20	BFD 49^{†}	31	37	42	45	35	DNS 49	–	358	309
41	Dawn Xiaodan Liu; Sara Li Ching Tan	Singapore	42	45^{†}	36	41	37	16	44	39	33	41	–	374	329
42	Dana Archibald; Karen Dexter	Canada	36	41^{†}	41	39	39	41	41	38	41	35	–	392	351
43	Erica Dawson; Vicky Francis	New Zealand	32	43	43	44^{†}	44	40	43	41	37	42	–	409	365
44	Yana Markova; Iva Nedeva	Bulgaria	44	39	45^{†}	40	42	45	40	37	42	43	–	417	372
45	Khairunnisa Mohd Afendy; Norashikin Mohd Sayed	Malaysia	43	44	44	43	30	43	46^{†}	42	44	44	–	423	377
46	Carrie Smith; Ella Clark	Australia	41	42	48^{†}	42	43	44	45	44	45	47	–	441	393
47	Aurora Paterson; Tara McCall	Australia	47	46	47	45	38	46	48^{†}	43	46	46	–	452	404
48	Cara Vavolotis; Lara Dallman-Weiss	United States	46	47^{†}	46	46	45	47	47	46	47	45	–	462	415

Legend: – Qualified for medal race(s); BFD – Black flag disqualification; DNF – Did not finish; DNS – Did not start; DSQ – Disqualified; OCS – On the course side of the starting line; RDG – Redress given; † – Discarded race not counted in the overall result;
