= Sailing at the 2011 Pan American Games – Laser =

Men's Laser class at the 2011 Pan American Games
- Venue: Vallarta Yacht Club
- Dates: October 17–23
- Competitors: 13 from 13 nations

Medalists
Gold medal	Julio Alsogaray	Argentina
Silver medal	Matías del Solar	Chile
Bronze medal	Juan Maegli	Guatemala

The men's Laser class sailing event at the 2011 Pan American Games will be held from October 17–23 at the Vallarta Yacht Club in Puerto Vallarta. The defending Pan American Games champion is Andrew Campbell of the United States.

Points were assigned based on the finishing position in each race (1 for first, 2 for second, etc.). The points were totaled from the top 9 results of the first 10 races, with lower totals being better. If a sailor was disqualified or did not complete the race, 14 points were assigned for that race (as there were 13 sailors in this competition). The top 5 sailors at that point competed in the final race, with placings counting double for final score. The sailor with the lowest total score won.

== Schedule ==
All times are Central Standard Time (UTC−6).

Date	Time	Round
October 17, 2011	13:00	1 and 2 races
October 18, 2011	13:00	3 and 4 races
October 19, 2011	13:00	5 and 6 races
October 21, 2011	13:00	7 and 8 races
October 22, 2011	13:00	9 and 10 races
October 23, 2011	13:31	Medal race

== Results ==
Race M is the medal race in which only the top 5 competitors took part. Each boat can drop its lowest result provided that all ten races are completed. If less than ten races are completed all races will count. Boats cannot drop their result in the medal race. If a boat does not enter a race (DNE) they are given 14 points, and this score must count towards their net total.

Rank	Athlete	Race											Total Points	Net Points
Rank	Athlete	1	2	3	4	5	6	7	8	9	10	M	Total Points	Net Points
1st place, gold medalist(s)	Julio Alsogaray (ARG)	3	1	3	3	1	6	2	2	3	(7)	6	37	30
2nd place, silver medalist(s)	Matias Andres del Solar (CHI)	9	9	5	1	2	1	(10)	6	1	3	2	49	39
3rd place, bronze medalist(s)	Juan Ignacio Maegli (GUA)	(14); OCS	6	6	9	3	2	1	4	6	1	4	56	42
4	Alejandro Jose Foglia (URU)	4	3	7	6	4	4	4	3	(8)	2	8	53	45
5	Bruno da Silva (BRA)	2	2	10	4	5	7	(14); RAF	1	4	4	10	63	49
6	Clayton Erik Johnson (USA)	7	5	1	5	6	(8)	5	7	2	5	–	51	43
7	David John Wynne Wright (CAN)	5	4	(8)	2	8	5	3	5	7	6	–	53	45
8	Raul Alfonso Aguayo Saladin (DOM)	1	8	2	8	10	12	6	11	(14); OCS	10	–	82	68
9	Andrey Quintero (COL)	8	11	4	11	7	3	7	(13)	10	9	–	83	70
10	Andrew Lewis (TRI)	10	7	9	7	13	10	14; OCS	8	5	12	–	95	81
11	José Ruiz (VEN)	6	10	(13)	12	12	9	9	10	12	8	–	95	82
12	Cy Chris Thompson (ISV)	12	(13)	12	13	9	14; DNE	8	9	9	11	–	110	97
13	Ricardo Montemayor (MEX)	11	12	11	10	11	11	11	12	11	(13)	–	113	100
