= Sailing at the 2012 Summer Olympics – Women's RS:X =

Women's RS:X at the Games of the XXX Olympiad
- Line drawing of the RS-X
- Venue: Weymouth and Portland National Sailing Academy
- Dates: 31 July – 7 August
- Competitors: 27 from 27 nations

Medalists
1st place, gold medalist(s)		Marina Alabau	Spain
2nd place, silver medalist(s)		Tuuli Petäjä	Finland
3rd place, bronze medalist(s)		Zofia Klepacka	Poland

The women's RS:X was a sailing event on the Sailing at the 2012 Summer Olympics program in Weymouth and Portland National Sailing Academy. Eleven races (last one a medal race) were scheduled and completed. 27 sailors, on 27 boards, from 27 nations competed. Ten boards qualified for the medal race on course area Nothe in front of Weymouth, where each position scored double points.

== Summary ==
Yachting New Zealand, the National Authority for sailing in New Zealand made the decision not to be represented in the Women's RS:X. The decision was partly based upon the fact that windsurfing would not be on the 2016 program. After the 2012 Olympics the decision to discontinue windsurfing was reverted.

== Schedule ==
●	Practice race	●	Race on Portland	●	Race on Nothe	●	Race on West	●	Medal race on Nothe

Date	July						August											
Date	26 Thu	27 Fri	28 Sat	29 Sun	30 Mon	31 Tue	1 Wed	2 Thu	3 Fri	4 Sat	5 Sun	6 Mon	7 Tue	8 Wed	9 Thu	10 Fri	11 Sat	12 Sun
Women's RS:X					●	2	2	2	Spare day	2	2	Spare day	MR					

== Course areas and course configurations ==
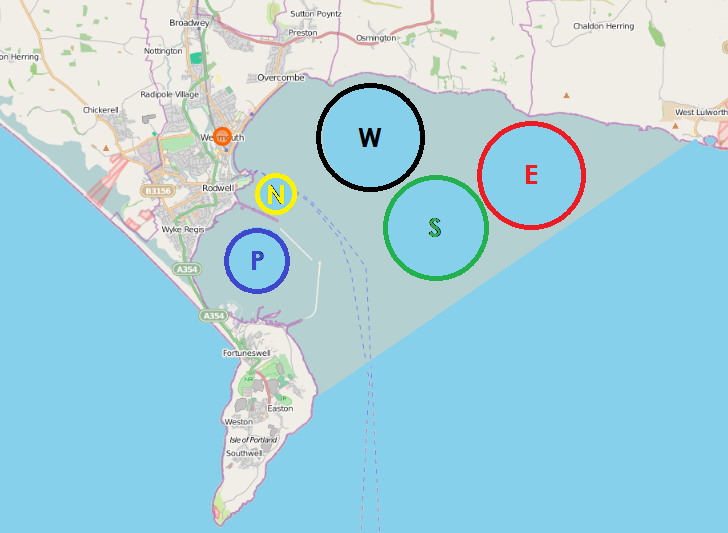
Course areas: Portland (P) Nothe (N) West (W) / South (S) East (E)

For the RS:X course areas Portland, Nothe, and West were used. The location (50° 35.19’ N, 02° 26.54’ W) points to the center Portland course area, the location (50° 36.18’ N 02° 25.98’ W) points to the center of the Nothe course area and the location (50° 37.18’ N 02° 23.55’ W) points to the center of the West course area. The target time for the course was 30 minutes for the races and 20 minutes for the medal race. The race management could choose from many course configurations.

== Results ==
Results of individual races
Pos	Helmsman	Country	I	II	III	IV	V	VI	VII	VIII	IX	X	MR	Tot	Pts
Gold medal	Marina Alabau	Spain	2	1	1	1	5	2	3	DPI 8^{†}	6	3	2	34.0	26.0
Silver medal	Tuuli Petäjä	Finland	8^{†}	7	3	4	4	4	8	2	5	1	8	54.0	46.0
Bronze medal	Zofia Klepacka	Poland	5	2	12	3	1	1	9	27^{†}	4	4	6	68.0	47.0
4	Olha Maslivets	Ukraine	3	4	14^{†}	10	3	3	1	3	7	10	4	62.0	48.0
5	Moana Delle	Germany	4	5	2	5	9^{†}	5	4	9	3	2	12	60.0	51.0
6	Lee Korzits	Israel	1	3	7	2	2	11^{†}	2	1	9	11	18	67.0	56.0
7	Bryony Shaw	Great Britain	7	6	4	9^{†}	6	8	7	5	1	5	10	68.0	59.0
8	Charline Picon	France	9	11	5	7	10	6	12^{†}	10	11	6	14	101.0	89.0
9	Alessandra Sensini	Italy	12^{†}	9	11	8	11	9	6	6	10	9	16	107.0	95.0
10	Nikola Girke	Canada	6	14	10	6	8	10	13	4	19^{†}	18	20	128.0	109.0
11	Jessica Crisp	Australia	11	10	17^{†}	17	7	12	5	7	13	13		113.0	96.0
12	Hei Man Hayley Chan	Hong Kong	10	8	9	13	12	15^{†}	11	11	8	14		111.0	96.0
13	Patrícia Freitas	Brazil	13	13	16	12	13	17	16	19^{†}	2	8		129.0	110.0
14	Li Ling	China	16	15	8	14	18	7	10	13	14	23^{†}		138.0	115.0
15	Ingrid Puusta	Estonia	15	20	6	15	14	27^{†}	15	12	20	17		155.0	134.0
16	Angeliki Skarlatou	Greece	14	12	21	11	19	16	19	OCS 27^{†}	15	7		161.0	134.0
17	Sigrid Rondelez	Belgium	18	21	19	OCS 27^{†}	15	13	14	14	17	19		177.0	150.0
18	Diána Detre	Hungary	17	16	13	19	16	14	17	18	27^{†}	20		171.0	150.0
19	Jannicke Stålstrøm	Norway	21	17	24^{†}	21	17	18	21	15	12	15		181.0	157.0
20	Farrah Hall	United States	22	18	18	18	20	22	23	OCS 27^{†}	16	16		200.0	173.0
21	Yuki Sunaga	Japan	19	23	22	22	22	24^{†}	22	20	18	12		204.0	180.0
22	Irina Konstantinova-Bontemps	Bulgaria	23	22	15	20	23	20	20	16	24^{†}	21		204.0	180.0
23	Jazmín López	Argentina	20	19	20	24	21	19	25^{†}	17	25	25		215.0	190.0
24	Napalai Tansai	Thailand	24	24	23	23	25	25	18	DSQ 27^{†}	22	22		233.0	206.0
25	Tatiana Bazyuk	Russia	RAF 27^{†}	25	DNF 27	16	24	23	24	22	23	24		235.0	208.0
26	Carolina Mendelblatt	Portugal	DNC 27^{†}	DNC 27	DNC 27	DNC 27	DNC 27	DNC 27	DNC 27	DNC 27	DNC 27	DNC 27		270.0	243.0

Scoring system: low-point system; Source:
Legend: – Qualified for medal race(s); DNC – Did not come to the starting area; DNF – Did not finish; DPI – Discretionary penalty imposed; DSQ – Disqualified; OCS – On the course side of the starting line; RAF – Retired after finishing; † – Discarded race not counted in the overall result;

== Daily standings ==
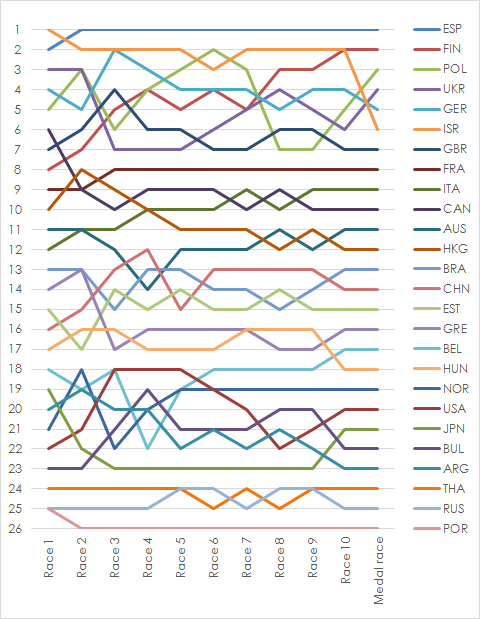
Graph showing the daily standings in the Women's RS:X during the 2012 Summer Olympics
