= Raudaschl =

Raudaschl is a surname primarily found in Austria. Notable people with the surname include:

- Elisabeth Raudaschl (born 1997), Austrian ski jumper
- Florian Raudaschl (born 1978), Austrian sailor
- Hubert Raudaschl (1942–2025), Austrian sailor and sailboat manufacturer
- Walter Raudaschl (born 1954), Austrian sailor
