= Shi Jian (disambiguation) =

Shi Jian (died 350) was emperor of the Chinese state Later Zhao.

Shi Jian may also refer to:

- Shi Jian (sailor), a Chinese sailor and yacht racer
- Shi Jian, the Mandarin name of Shih Kien
- Shi Jianqiao, the murderer of warlord Sun Chuanfang

== See also ==
- Shih Chien University
