= Gong Lei =

Gong Lei may refer to:

- Gong Lei (footballer) (born 1965), Chinese football coach and former player
- Gong Lei (sailor) (born 1983), Chinese sailor
- Gong Lei (handballer) (born 2000), Chinese handball player
