= Sailing at the 2012 Summer Olympics – 49er =

Men's 49er at the Games of the XXX Olympiad
- Line drawing of the 49er
- Venue: Weymouth and Portland National Sailing Academy
- Dates: 30 July – 8 August
- Competitors: 40 from 20 nations

Medalists
1st place, gold medalist(s)		Nathan Outteridge; Iain Jensen	Australia
2nd place, silver medalist(s)		Peter Burling; Blair Tuke	New Zealand
3rd place, bronze medalist(s)		Allan Nørregaard; Peter Lang	Denmark

The men's 49er was a sailing event on the Sailing at the 2012 Summer Olympics program in Weymouth and Portland National Sailing Academy. Sixteen races (last one a medal race) were scheduled and completed. 40 sailors, on 20 boats, from 20 nations competed. Ten boats qualified for the medal race on course area Nothe in front of Weymouth, where each position scored double points.

== Schedule ==
●	Practice race	●	Race on Portland	●	Race on Nothe	●	Race on West	●	Medal race on Nothe

Date	July						August											
Date	26 Thu	27 Fri	28 Sat	29 Sun	30 Mon	31 Tue	1 Wed	2 Thu	3 Fri	4 Sat	5 Sun	6 Mon	7 Tue	8 Wed	9 Thu	10 Fri	11 Sat	12 Sun
Men's 49er				●	2	2	2	2	3	Spare day	2	2	Spare day	MR				

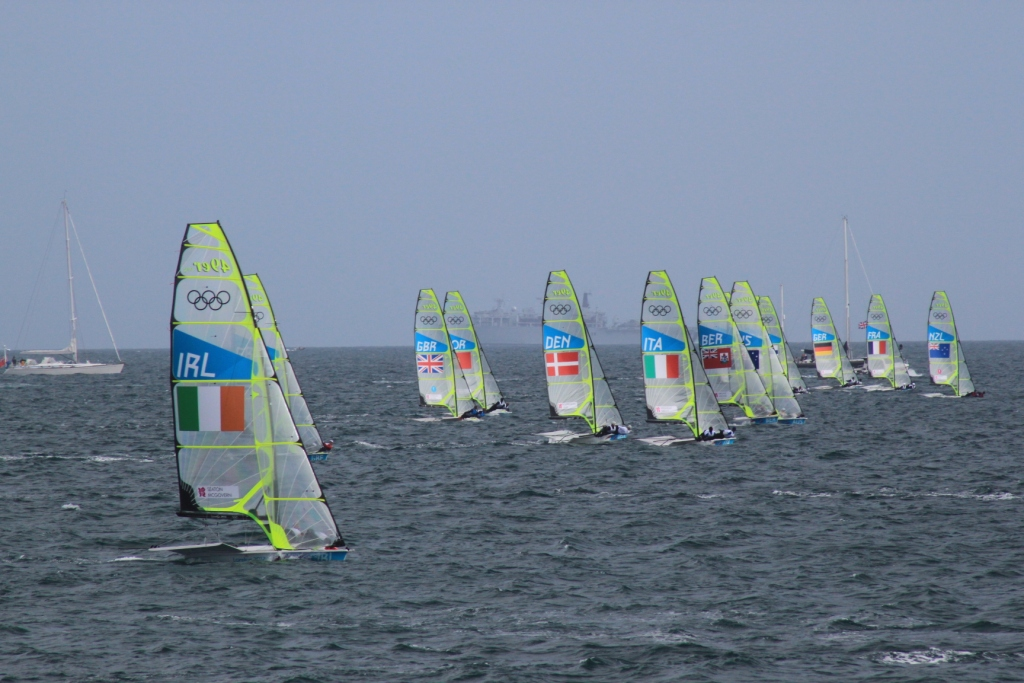
49ers Race 11 on 3 August

== Course areas and course configurations ==
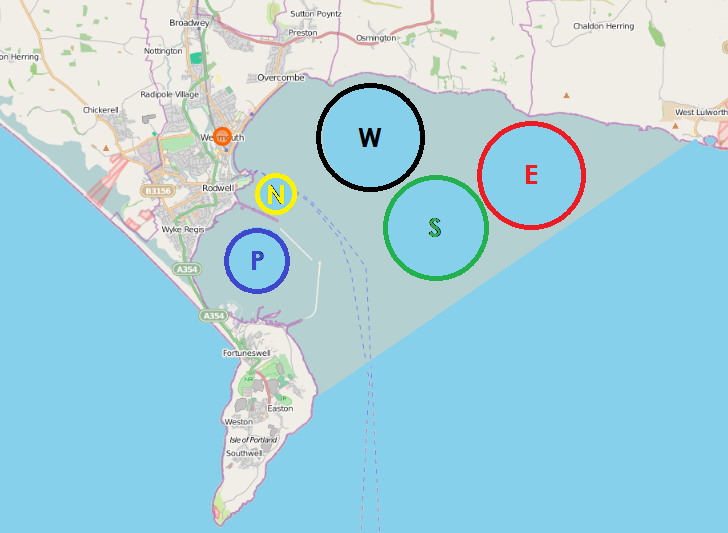
Course areas: Portland (P) Nothe (N) West (W) / South (S) East (E)

For the 49er course areas Portland, Nothe, and West were used. The location (50° 35.19’ N, 02° 26.54’ W) points to the center Portland course area, the location (50° 36.18’ N 02° 25.98’ W) points to the center of the Nothe course area and the location (50° 37.18’ N 02° 23.55’ W) points to the center of the West course area. The target time for the course was 30 minutes for the races as well as the medal race. The race management could choose from many course configurations.

== Results ==
Results of individual races
Pos	Helmsman	Country	I	II	III	IV	V	VI	VII	VIII	IX	X	XI	XII	XIII	XIV	XV	MR	Tot	Pts
Gold medal	Nathan Outteridge; Iain Jensen	Australia	8	1	2	4	2	1	10^{†}	6	9	5	4	1	1	1	3	8	66.0	56.0
Silver medal	Peter Burling; Blair Tuke	New Zealand	9	7	1	7	3	5	9	11	7	2	1	2	15^{†}	6	6	4	95.0	80.0
Bronze medal	Allan Nørregaard; Peter Lang	Denmark	2	4	14	6	16^{†}	15	5	7	13	6	16	4	4	3	9	6	130.0	114.0
4	Nico Delle Karth; Nikolaus Resch	Austria	10	15	6	5	5	16	4	19^{†}	4	9	6	17	11	4	4	2	137.0	118.0
5	Stevie Morrison; Ben Rhodes	Great Britain	12	12	3	18	4	2	1	1	17	4	20^{†}	13	3	17	7	10	144.0	124.0
6	Emmanuel Dyen; Stéphane Christidis	France	1	9	9	12	1	10	12	13	10	OCS 21^{†}	2	5	10	7	14	12	148.0	127.0
7	Lauri Lehtinen; Kalle Bask	Finland	19^{†}	18	4	11	6	8	2	2	1	11	3	11	19	11	2	20	148.0	129.0
8	Bernardo Freitas; Francisco Andrade	Portugal	7	2	10	9	10	6	13	5	8	12	9	10	5	14	15^{†}	14	149.0	134.0
9	Giuseppe Angilella; Gianfranco Sibello	Italy	14	11	13	10	11	7	8	12	15	3	13	18^{†}	9	5	1	16	166.0	148.0
10	Jonas von Geijer; Niclas Düring	Sweden	5	3	12	8	17	4	14	3	16	8	19^{†}	6	18	10	11	18	172.0	153.0
11	Tobias Schadewaldt; Hannes Baumann	Germany	17	5	20^{†}	19	15	9	7	14	3	1	10	9	12	13	8		162.0	142.0
12	Iker Martínez de Lizarduy; Xabier Fernández	Spain	15	6	7	3	14	18^{†}	3	15	12	14	8	14	8	15	12		164.0	146.0
13	Łukasz Przybytek; Paweł Kołodziński	Poland	11	14	11	13	8	3	15	10	5	13	11	12	7	18^{†}	13		164.0	146.0
14	Ryan Seaton; Matt McGovern	Ireland	4	8	15	2	12	19^{†}	11	9	14	7	15	7	13	16	16		168.0	149.0
15	Erik Storck; Trevor Moore	United States	6	10	16	1	7	13	20^{†}	18	2	17	5	20	17	8	17		177.0	157.0
16	Gordon Cook; Hunter Lowden	Canada	3	16	5	17	9	17	16	8	11	16	7	8	20	9	DNF 21^{†}		183.0	162.0
17	Pavle Kostov; Petar Cupać	Croatia	13	17	8	15	13	14	17	4	19^{†}	15	17	3	14	12	19		200.0	181.0
18	Yukio Makino; Kenji Takahashi	Japan	16	13	17	14	18^{†}	11	18	16	18	18	14	15	6	2	10		206.0	188.0
19	Jesse Kirkland; Alexander Kirkland	Bermuda	DNF 21^{†}	19	18	DNF 21	DNF 21	12	6	DNF 21	6	10	12	19	2	19	18		225.0	204.0
20	Dionysios Dimou; Mike Pateniotis	Greece	18	20^{†}	19	16	19	20	19	17	20	19	18	16	16	20	5		262.0	242.0

Scoring system: low-point system; Source:
Legend: – Qualified for medal race(s); DNF – Did not finish; OCS – On the course side of the starting line; † – Discarded race not counted in the overall result;

== Daily standings ==
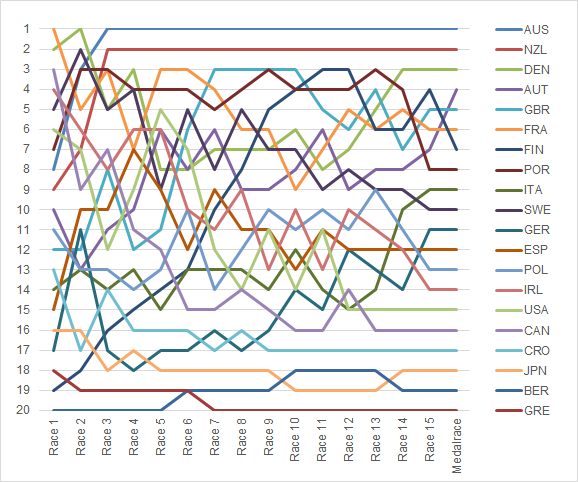
Graph showing the daily standings in the men's 49er during the 2012 Summer Olympics
