= Grotelüschen =

Grotelüschen is a German surname. Notable people with the surname include:

- Astrid Grotelüschen (born 1964), German politician
- Simon Grotelüschen (born 1986), German sailor
