= Zofia Klepacka =

Polish windsurfer (born 1986)

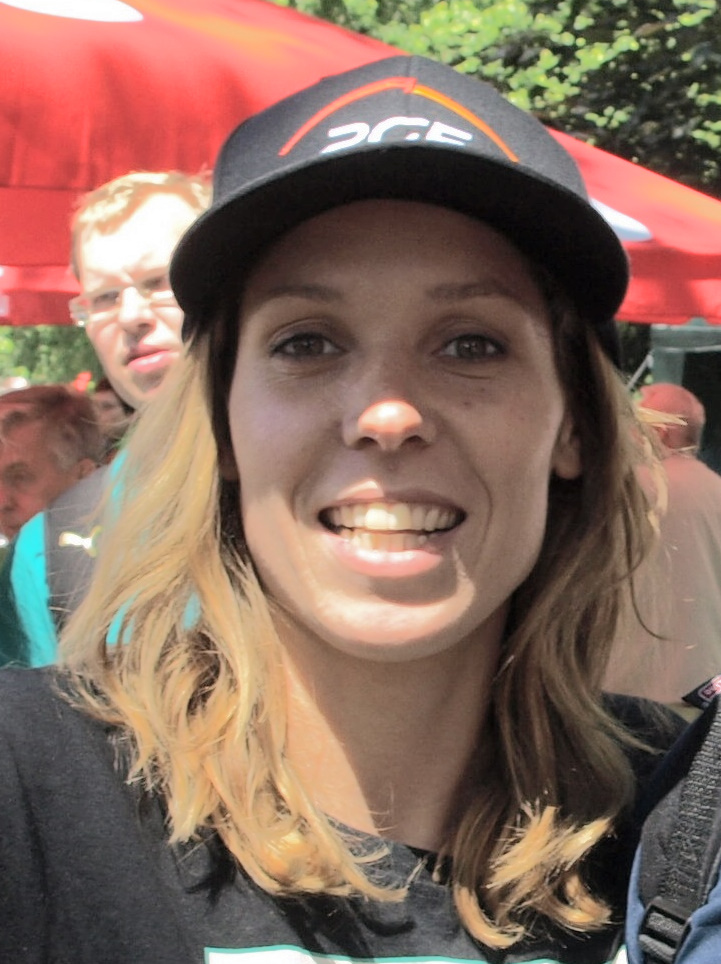

Personal information
- Full name: Zofia Teresa Noceti-Klepacka
- Nationality: Polish
- Born: 26 April 1986 (age 40) Warsaw, Poland
- Height: 1.70 m (5 ft 7 in)
- Weight: 59 kg (130 lb)

Sport
- Country: Poland
- Sport: Sailing
- Event: Windsurfing
- Club: Legia Warsaw
Medal record
Women's windsurfing
Representing Poland
Olympic Games
Bronze medal – third place	2012 London	RS:X
World Championships
Gold medal – first place	2007 Cascais	RS:X
Silver medal – second place	2011 Perth	RS:X
Silver medal – second place	2012 Cádiz	RS:X
European Championships
Gold medal – first place	2011 Burgas	RS:X
Gold medal – first place	2017 Marseille	RS:X
Gold medal – first place	2018 Sopot	RS:X
Silver medal – second place	2016 Helsinki	RS:X
Bronze medal – third place	2010 Sopot	RS:X
Bronze medal – third place	2014 Çeşme	RS:X
Bronze medal – third place	2015 Mondello	RS:X
Bronze medal – third place	2020 Vilamoura	RS:X
Bronze medal – third place	2021 Vilamoura	RS:X

Zofia Teresa Noceti-Klepacka (born 26 April 1986) is a Polish windsurfer and a political far-right media personality.

== Biography ==
Klepacka grew up in Warsaw, in one of the tenement houses on Marszałkowska Street.

She is the most successful participant at the World Sailing own Youth Sailing World Championships winning four titles this matched that of Great Britain Sally Cuthbert. She went on to win senior world championship in 2007 claiming the RS:X World Championships.

She participated in three editions of the Olympic Games, winning the bronze medal at the 2012 Summer Olympics.

== Achievements ==
Year	Event / Title	Venue	Position
Olympic Games
2004	Olympic Games - Female Windsurfing (Mistral)	Athens	12th
2008	Olympic Games - Female Windsurfing (RS:X)	Qindoa	7th
2012	Olympic Games - Female Windsurfing (RS:X)	Weymouth	
2020	Olympic Games - Female Windsurfing (RS:X)	Tokoyo	9th
World Championships
2001	2001 ISAF Youth Sailing World Championships - Mistral Female		
2002	2002 ISAF Youth Sailing World Championships - Mistral Female		
2003	2003 ISAF Youth Sailing World Championships - Mistral Female		
2003	Mistral World Championships - Female	Cádiz	10th
2004	2004 ISAF Youth Sailing World Championships - Mistral Female		
2004	Mistral World Championships - Female	İzmir	20th
2005	Formula World Championships - Female	Melbourne	5th
2006	RS:X World Championships - Female	Torbole	4th
2007	RS:X World Championships - Female	Cascais	
2008	RS:X World Championships	Auckland	12th
2010	RS:X World Championships	Kerteminde	5th
2011	RS:X World Championships	Perth	
2012	RS:X World Championships	Cádiz	
2014	RS:X World Championships	Santander	7th
2015	RS:X World Championships	Al-Musannah	4th
2016	RS:X World Championships	Eilat	4th
2017	RS:X World Championships		4th
2018	RS:X World Championships		5th
2019	RS:X World Championships		8th
2020	RS:X World Championships		7th
2021	RS:X World Championships		5th
2022	iQFoil World Championships		33rd
2023	2023 Sailing World Championships - iQFoil		33rd
2024	iQFoil World Championships		29th
2025	Formula Foil Windsurfing World Championship - Female		6th

== Life after sports ==
In 2009 she married the Argentine sailor Lucio Noceti, with whom she has a son. In 2012 the couple separated, in 2019 divorced. She has a daughter with Michał Pater.

In February 2019, she criticized the Mayor of Warsaw Rafał Trzaskowski and the "LGBT+ declaration" signed by him. She published on her social media "No on has the right to impose on our children something we parents don’t want!!!!". Klepacka's comments received hundreds of reactions, including many from fans in agreement with her stance. She also applauded a right wing publication that equated LGBT people to Nazis. She is also a vociferous opponent of abortion. In 2019 she featured in a far-right propaganda video on YouTube which was later taken down for inciting hatred.
