= Ingrid Puusta =

Estonian windsurfer

Personal information
- Nationality: Estonia
- Born: 8 November 1990 (age 35) Tartu, Estonia
- Height: 1.63 m (5 ft 4 in)
- Weight: 58 kg (128 lb)

Sailing career
- Sport: Sailing
- Club: Noblessner Yacht Club
- Coached by: Matthew Rickard
- Class: RS:X

Ingrid Puusta (born 8 November 1990 in Tartu) is an Estonian Olympic windsurfer, who specializes in the Neil Pryde RS:X class. She represented Estonia at the 2012 and 2016 Summer Olympics, and trains at Noblessner Yacht Club in Tallinn under her personal coach Matthew Rickard. As of March 2017, Puusta is ranked no. 10 in the world for the RS:X class by the World Sailing.

Puusta competed in the women's RS:X class at the 2012 Summer Olympics in London, receiving a berth due to her results at the World Championships in Cádiz, Spain. Delivering a satisfactory effort in the opening series, Puusta managed to pull off a sixth position on the third leg, but fell short of reaching the medal race with an accumulated net score of 134 and a fifteenth-place finish in a fleet of twenty-six sailors.

At the Rio Olympics Puusta almost didn't reach the medal race before coming 11th over all.

On 25 September 2016 Ingrid Puusta windsurfed 164.5 km across the Baltic Sea alone to rise money for disabled sailing in Estonia. Puusta started from Swedish Farö near Gotland on Sunday morning 0737 UTC+3 and finished 2125 UTC+3 at Türju in Saaremaa, Estonia. Weak wind extended her crossing time to nearly 14 hours.

In the 2019 pre-Olympics event READY STEADY TOKYO in Enoshima, Japan, Ingrid Puusta achieved 8th position overall, achieving 3rd place in the medal race. At the 2019 RS:X World Championships, held in tricky wind conditions at Lake Garda, she finished 28th overall. She finished in 16th place at the 2020 RS:X World Championships.

2024 Ingrid Puusta finished 17th in the IQFoil class, with 162 points at the Paris Olympics, in Marseille.

She has several Estonian Champion titles over the years.
