= Susannah Pyatt =

New Zealand sailor

Personal information
- Nickname: The Extreme
- Born: 17 May 1990 (age 36)

Sport
- Country: New Zealand
- Sport: Sailing

Susannah Pyatt (born 17 May 1990) is a New Zealand competitive sailor. She competed at the 2012 Summer Olympics in London, in the women's Elliott 6m with Stephanie Hazard and Jenna Hansen.
