= Tatiana Bazyuk =

Russian windsurfer

Personal information
- Full name: Tatyana Vyacheslavovna Bazyuk
- Nationality: Russia
- Born: 18 October 1984 (age 41) Lutsk, Ukrainian SSR, Soviet Union
- Height: 1.67 m (5 ft 5 1/2 in)
- Weight: 58 kg (128 lb)

Sailing career
- Sport: Sailing
- Club: CSKA Moskva
- Coached by: Roman Matsyusovich
- Class: Sailboard

Tatyana Vyacheslavovna Bazyuk (also Tatiana Bazyuk, Russian: Татьяна Вячеславовна Базюк; born 18 October 1984 in Lutsk, Ukrainian SSR) is a Ukrainian-born Russian windsurfer, who specializes in Neil Pryde RS:X class. She represented and competed for Russia in two editions of the Olympic Games (2008 and 2012) and is currently training for the Russian Army Forces under her coach Roman Matsyusovich.

Bazyuk made her official debut at the 2008 Summer Olympics in Beijing, where she placed twenty-fourth in the newly introduced RS:X class with a net score of 198, trailing Mexico's Demita Vega by an eight-point gap.

At the 2012 Summer Olympics in London, Bazyuk competed for her second Russian team in the RS:X class by receiving a berth from the World Championships in Cádiz, Spain. Bazyuk delivered a mediocre effort with two incomplete legs and a twenty-fifth-place finish in a fleet of twenty-six windsurfers, accumulating a net score of 208 points.
