= Eran Sela =

Israeli sailor (born 1985)

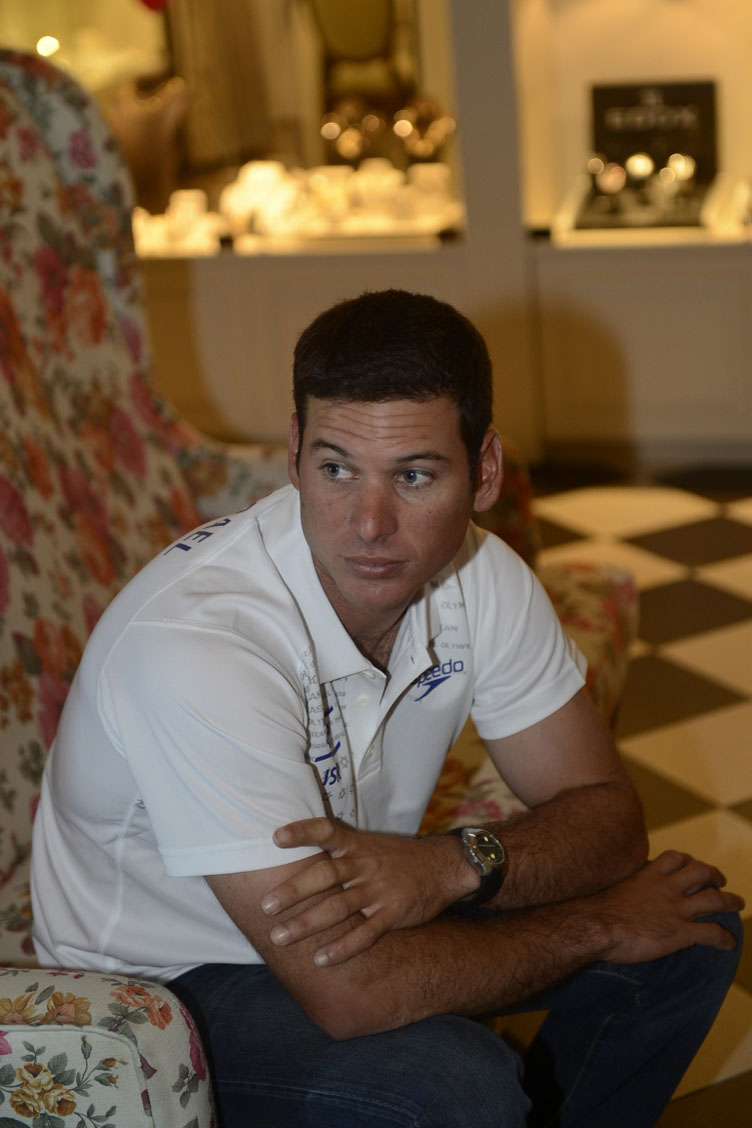
- Sela at a consolidation event of the Olympic Committee of Israel in Eilat, 2012

Personal information
- Native name: ערן סלע
- Born: 10 March 1985 (age 41) Hadera, Israel
- Height: 1.71 m (5 ft 7 in)
- Weight: 73 kg (161 lb)

Sport
- Country: Israel
- Sport: Sailing
- Event: 470
- Club: Sdot Yam Yacht Club
- Coached by: Eyal Levine

Achievements and titles
- Highest world ranking: 3rd (470, 2012)
Medal record
Sailing
Representing Israel
ISAF Sailing World Cup
Silver medal – second place	2012 Palma de Majorca	470
Bronze medal – third place	2010 Miami	470
470 European Championships
Silver medal – second place	2010 Istanbul	470
Bronze medal – third place	2011 Helsinki	470
470 European Junior Championships
Bronze medal – third place	2004 Hungary	470
- Updated on 22 October 2012

Eran Sela (Hebrew: ערן סלע; born 10 March 1985) is an Israeli Olympic sailor, sailing in the 470 discipline. His current partner is Gideon Kliger.

== Early life ==
Sela was born in Hadera and resides in the kibbutz Sdot Yam. His father works at sea-craft maintenance and gives oceanic services, while his mother works at Caeserstone. He has two siblings, Roi, who works on a project relating to ships and Ofri, who worked as a skipper assistant.

In the army, he served at the Flotilla base in Atlit as an "exceptional sportsman".

== Career ==
Sela is a member of the Sdot Yam Yacht Club, where he began sailing when he was 14 on a 420 dinghy and then switched to a 470 dinghy. In the European Junior Championship in Hungary in 2004, he won a bronze medal. He was twice the Israeli national champion, and three times the runner-up.

His first partner was Aviv Ben-Hurin, and afterwards Yogev Yosef, both of them from Sdot Yam. In 2009, he competed with Yosef for a ticket to the 2012 Summer Olympics against Udi Gal and Gideon Kliger but placed low.

He quit sailing following financing problems, and coached for 1.5 years. Gal and Kliger broke up their partnership after Gal retired from sailing, and Kliger joined Sela. After a month of training, the duo finished third place in the Rolex Cup in Miami.

In March 2010, they placed first in the Israeli Championships, and won a silver medal in the same year 470 European Championships in Istanbul.

In 2011, they won a bronze medal in the 470 European Championships in Helsinki. Afterwards, they won a bronze medal in the Olympic Test Event at Weymouth, which gave them the Israeli Olympic criteria. In the 2011 ISAF Sailing World Championships, held in Perth, they finished 4th place and qualified for the 2012 Summer Olympics.

In 2012 they won a silver medal at the ISAF Sailing World Cup in Palma. From then they have been in a decline, only reaching 8th place at the 2012 470 World Championships and 15th place at the 2012 Summer Olympics.

== See also ==
- List of European Championships medalists in sailing
