= Jazmín López Becker =

Argentine windsurfer (born 1992)

Jazmín López
Personal information
- Full name: Jazmín López Becker
- Nicknames: Jaz, Kapa
- Nationality: Argentina
- Born: 5 June 1992 (age 34) Villa Carlos Paz, Argentina
- Height: 1.74 m (5 ft 8 1/2 in)
- Weight: 60 kg (132 lb)

Sport

Sailing career
- Class: Sailboard
- Club: Club Nautico Córdoba

Jazmín López Becker (born 5 June 1992 in Villa Carlos Paz, Córdoba) is an Argentine windsurfer, who specialized in Neil Pryde RS:X class. As of September 2013, Lopez is ranked no. 84 in the world for the sailboard class by the International Sailing Federation.

Lopez made her official debut at the 2011 Pan American Games in Guadalajara, Mexico, where she finished fifth in the women's sailboard class with a net score of 47 points.

At the 2012 Summer Olympics in London, Lopez competed in the women's RS:X class at the 2012 Summer Olympics in London by receiving a berth from the World Championships in Cadiz, Spain. Struggling to attain a top position in the opening series, Lopez accumulated a net score of 190 points for a twenty-third-place finish in a fleet of twenty-six sailors.
