= Carolina Mendelblatt =

Brazilian sailor (born 1979)

Personal information
- Full name: Carolina Souza Borges Mendelblatt
- Nickname: Carol
- Nationality: Brazil; Portugal
- Born: 25 May 1979 (age 47) Rio de Janeiro, Brazil
- Height: 1.75 m (5 ft 9 in)
- Weight: 60 kg (132 lb)

Sport

Sailing career
- Class(es): Sailboard, Sailboat
- Club: Iate Clube do Rio de Janeiro (BRA); Clube de Vela de Portugal (POR)

Carolina Souza Mendelblatt (née Borges, born 25 May 1979 in Rio de Janeiro) is a Brazilian-born Portuguese windsurfer, who specialized in Mistral and Neil Pryde RS:X classes. She graduated with a BA (Hons)at Ravensbourne College of Design and Communication and worked as a broadcaster in London, U.K. She represented Brazil at the 2004 Summer Olympics, and had been training with the Rio de Janeiro Yacht Club (Portuguese: Iate Clube do Rio de Janeiro) for most of her career before joining the Portuguese squad in 2012. As of September 2013, Mendelblatt is ranked no. 91 in the world for the sailboard class by the International Sailing Federation.

Mendelblatt made her official debut as a member of the Brazilian squad at the 2004 Summer Olympics in Athens, where she placed twenty-fifth in women's Mistral sailboard with an accumulated net score of 229, edging out Puerto Rico's Karla Barrera by a vast, 31-point gap.

Eight years after competing in her last Olympics, Mendelblatt joined the Portuguese squad to compete for the second time in the RS:X class at the 2012 Summer Olympics in London by receiving a berth from the World Championships in Cadiz, Spain. Mendelblatt withdrew from the Games before the event had officially started, claiming that she lacked the support of the Portuguese mission and that she was three months pregnant.

Mendelblatt is married to Star sailor and two-time U.S. Olympian Mark Mendelblatt (2004 and 2012), and the couple currently resides in Miami, Florida.
