= Stephanie Hazard =

New Zealand sailor

Personal information
- Nationality: New Zealand
- Born: 24 November 1989 (age 36)

Sport
- Country: New Zealand
- Sport: Sailing
- Retired: 2012

Stephanie Hazard (born 29 November 1989, Subiaco) is a New Zealand competitive sailor. She competed at the 2012 Summer Olympics in London, in the women's Elliott 6m, with Jenna Hansen and Susannah Pyatt.
