= Caleb Paine =

American sailor (born 1990)

Personal information
- Nationality: American
- Born: November 21, 1991 (age 34)
- Height: 1.91 m (6 ft 3 in)
- Weight: 97 kg (214 lb)

Sport
- Country: United States
- Sport: Sailing
- Club: Mission Bay Yacht Club; San Francisco Yacht Club (California)|Southwestern Yacht Club; St. Francis Yacht Club
Medal record
Sailing
Representing United States
Olympic Games
| Bronze medal – third place | 2016 Rio de Janeiro | Men's Finn |

Caleb Paine (born November 15, 1990) is an American sailor. He represented his country at the 2016 Summer Olympics. Paine started sailing at age 6 in the dingy favored by Southern California youth sailors called a Naples Sabot at Mission Bay Yacht Club. He later transferred to Southwestern Yacht Club and started sailing in the Laser class of sailboat in national competition. Forgoing college, Paine began his Olympic campaign in earnest in the Finn class as his size demanded. He began traveling the world to compete, raising money any way he could to stay in competition. He worked closely with Gold medalist and fellow American Zach Railey as his training partner leading up to the 2012 Olympics in London where Railey competed. He continued to train and develop his equipment and skills leading up to the 2016 Games in Rio. A very hard-fought battle with former training partner Railey resulted in Paine's earning the right to sail in Rio. The racing in Rio was equally challenging both off the water and on but Paine secured the Bronze Medal in the final medal race by posting a dominant win. For winning the Bronze Medal in the Rio Olympics Paine also was awarded the title of US Sailor of the Year.

He later went on to partner with Olympian Stu McNay and win the 505 World Championship. He currently owns and operated Podium Boats, a RIB sales and charter company utilizing VSR brand boats. He also sails professionally.
