= 2012 RS:X World Championships =

- 2012

Tournament information
- Location: Cádiz, Spain
- Month played: From 20 to 28 March
- Established: 1980
- Format: World Championship

Current champion
- (France) Julien Bontemps (men) (Israel) Lee Korzits (women)

The 2012 RS:X World Championships were held in Cádiz, Spain (in Puerto Sherry) between March 20 and March 28.

The regattas of the medal race were canceled due to strong winds.

== Men's results ==
#	Sailor	R1	R2	R3	R4	R5	R6	R7	R8	R9	R10	Tot.
1st place, gold medalist(s)	(France) Julien Bontemps	1.0	5.0	1.0	(6.0)	3.0	6.0	3.0	3.0	1.0	1.0	24.0
2nd place, silver medalist(s)	(United Kingdom) Nick Dempsey	9.0	1.0	2.0	1.0	5.0	(12.0)	2.0	1.0	2.0	3.0	26.0
3rd place, bronze medalist(s)	(New Zealand) Jon-Paul Tobin	5.0	(13.0)	3.0	4.0	2.0	5.0	4.0	2.0	4.0	2.0	31.0
4	(Netherlands) Dorian van Rijsselberghe	3.0	4.0	4.0	2.0	4.0	4.0	1.0	5.0	(9.0)	4.6	31.6
5	(Greece) Byron Kokkalanis	(8.0)	1.0	1.0	5.0	6.0	1.0	6.0	4.0	3.0	5.0	32.0
6	(Poland) Przemysław Miarczyński	(61.0)	3.0	6.0	12.0	1.0	2.0	5.0	10.0	8.0	6.0	53.0
7	(Israel) Nimrod Mashiah	1.0	4.0	6.0	1.0	(14.0)	7.0	14.0	7.0	5.0	9.0	54.0
8	(Germany) Toni Wilhelm	2.0	3.0	5.0	10.0	7.0	9.0	(30.0)	8.0	7.0	4.0	55.0
9	(Israel) Shahar Tzuberi	7.0	2.0	5.0	9.0	10.0	11.0	11.0	6.0	(27.0)	8.0	69.0
10	(Poland) Piotr Myszka	3.0	12.0	4.0	3.0	18.0	14.0	(23.0)	9.0	10.0	13.0	86.0
11	(Poland) Michal Majewski	7.0	2.0	3.0	8.0	9.0	10.0	17.0	16.0	(34.0)	23.0	95.0
12	(Portugal) João Rodrigues	12.0	7.0	10.0	4.0	11.0	(28.0)	22.0	21.0	11.0	12.0	110.0
13	(Spain) Iván Pastor	6.0	21.0	7.0	21.0	8.0	(61.0)	7.0	32.0	14.0	11.0	127.0
14	(Japan) Makoto Tomizawa	10.0	10.0	13.0	14.0	22.0	(23.0)	19.0	11.0	12.0	18.0	129.0
15	(France) Pierre Le Coq	11.0	(26.0)	9.0	11.0	16.0	18.0	18.0	13.0	18.0	19.0	133.0
16	(Canada) Zachary Plavsic	4.0	20.0	11.0	15.0	13.0	19.0	12.0	22.0	(35.0)	22.0	138.0
17	(South Korea) Lee Tae-hoon	8.0	7.0	21.0	17.0	20.0	13.0	21.0	14.0	19.0	(39.0)	140.0
18	(France) Benoit Bigot	11.0	23.0	2.0	7.0	17.0	26.0	10.0	(37.0)	22.0	31.0	149.0
19	(Cyprus) Andreas Cariolou	20.0	19.0	14.0	13.0	21.0	8.0	8.0	19.0	29.0	(36.0)	151.0
20	(Russia) Dmitrii Polishchuk	40.0	13.0	15.0	13.0	15.0	20.0	9.0	12.0	(61.0)	15.0	152.0
21	(France) HUG Louis Benoit	13.0	21.0	11.0	2.0	28.0	(35.0)	25.0	15.0	25.0	25.0	165.0
22	(France) Louis Giard	2.0	6.0	8.0	(36.0)	26.0	25.0	29.0	17.0	23.0	30.0	166.0
23	(France) Thomas Goyard	25.0	24.0	17.0	3.0	(47.0)	15.0	24.0	29.0	13.0	17.0	167.0
24	(Israel) Ron Asulin	28.0	18.0	12.0	18.0	(40.0)	16.0	20.0	23.0	6.0	26.0	167.0
25	(Switzerland) Richard Stauffacher	15.0	14.0	10.0	10.0	19.0	27.0	27.0	25.0	31.0	(44.0)	178.0
26	(Spain) Juan-Manuel Moreno	16.0	8.0	16.0	26.0	25.0	17.0	33.0	18.0	(38.0)	21.0	180.0
27	(Ukraine) Maksym Oberemko	18.0	22.0	7.0	20.0	27.0	22.0	(35.0)	30.0	33.0	14.0	193.0
28	(Poland) Pawel Tarnowski	18.0	10.0	12.0	19.0	43.0	24.0	15.0	(44.0)	26.0	29.0	196.0
29	(New Zealand) Tom Ashley	5.0	16.0	28.0	22.0	42.0	29.0	(43.0)	24.0	20.0	16.0	202.0
30	(United Kingdom) Connor Bainbridge	16.0	29.0	16.0	24.0	33.0	21.0	13.0	31.0	21.0	(37.0)	204.0

== Women's results ==
#	Sailor	R1	R2	R3	R4	R5	R6	R7	R8	R9	Tot.
1st place, gold medalist(s)	(Israel) Lee Korzits	1.0	1.0	1.0	1.0	1.0	2.0	(6.0)	4.0	2.0	13.0
2nd place, silver medalist(s)	(Poland) Zofia Klepacka	3.0	1.0	1.0	2.0	2.0	3.0	3.0	(5.0)	3.0	18.0
3rd place, bronze medalist(s)	(Italy) Alessandra Sensini	(12.0)	9.0	8.0	1.0	3.0	1.0	1.0	1.0	1.0	25.0
4	(United Kingdom) Bryony Shaw	(10.0)	6.0	4.0	5.0	9.0	4.0	5.0	2.0	4.0	39.0
5	(Poland) Maja Dziarnowska	1.0	7.0	3.0	3.0	4.0	6.0	(16.0)	10.0	9.0	43.0
6	(Israel) Maayan Davidovich	9.0	8.0	10.0	7.0	(16.0)	5.0	2.0	6.0	8.0	55.0
7	(France) Charline Picon	8.0	12.0	3.0	4.0	8.0	8.0	4.0	(13.0)	11.0	58.0
8	(Italy) Flavia Tartaglini	11.0	4.0	(41.0)	3.0	7.0	12.0	8.0	9.0	7.0	61.0
9	(Ukraine) Olga Maslivets	6.0	3.0	2.0	10.0	17.0	(26.0)	26.0	3.0	5.0	72.0
10	(Spain) Marina Alabau	5.0	2.0	5.0	5.0	6.0	9.0	10.0	33.0	(35.0)	75.0
11	(Canada) Nikola Girke	14.0	13.0	7.0	2.0	13.0	11.0	(15.0)	8.0	10.0	78.0
12	(Germany) Moana Delle	2.0	4.0	6.0	11.0	11.0	16.0	9.0	(23.0)	20.0	79.0
13	(Australia) Jessica Crisp	3.0	13.0	6.0	11.0	12.0	10.0	14.0	17.0	(18.0)	86.0
14	(Finland) Tuuli Petaja	10.0	8.0	(41.0)	9.0	25.0	14.0	7.0	7.0	13.0	93.0
15	(New Zealand) Natalia Kosińska	4.0	5.0	9.0	19.0	(33.0)	22.0	20.0	12.0	12.0	103.0
16	(Hong Kong) Chan Wai Kei	15.0	5.0	2.0	14.0	(36.0)	20.0	25.0	18.0	15.0	114.0
17	(Greece) Angeliki Skarlatou	5.0	6.0	7.0	9.0	15.0	13.0	(41.0)	27.0	32.0	114.0
18	(United Kingdom) Izzy Hamilton	19.0	15.0	5.0	6.0	23.0	(30.0)	30.0	11.0	6.0	115.0
19	(France) Hélène Noesmoen	17.0	10.0	11.0	8.0	18.0	15.0	17.0	(29.0)	19.0	115.0
20	(Poland) Agnieszka Bilska	11.0	11.0	12.0	12.0	14.0	21.0	18.0	16.0	(25.0)	115.0
21	(France) Pauline Perrin	16.0	15.0	19.0	4.0	19.0	18.0	11.0	14.0	(33.0)	116.0
22	(Spain) Blanca Manchón	2.0	2.0	(41.0)	10.0	10.0	7.0	19.0	41.0	41.0	132.0
23	(China) Li Ling	4.0	7.0	(41.0)	15.0	5.0	17.0	33.0	26.0	26.0	133.0
24	(Hong Kong) Hayley Victoria Chan Hei Man	7.0	12.0	13.0	13.0	26.0	24.0	(37.0)	22.0	17.0	134.0
25	(Italy) Laura Linares	16.0	11.0	(41.0)	17.0	20.0	28.0	13.0	15.0	14.0	134.0
26	(Poland) Hanna Zembrzuska	13.0	14.0	20.0	7.0	(29.0)	27.0	12.0	25.0	24.0	142.0
27	(China) Ning Wang	12.0	9.0	(41.0)	6.0	27.0	19.0	35.0	21.0	16.0	145.0
28	(China) Yue Huang	6.0	10.0	4.0	16.0	(34.0)	29.0	29.0	30.0	23.0	147.0
29	(Norway) Jannicke Stålstrøm	7.0	(41.0)	7.0	16.0	24.0	23.0	24.0	19.0	31.0	151.0
30	(Japan) Yuki Sunaga	13.0	3.0	(41.0)	14.0	22.0	33.0	23.0	35.0	22.0	165.0

== See also ==
- Windsurfing World Championships
