= Weymouth =

Weymouth can refer to:

== Places ==
=== United Kingdom ===
- Weymouth, Dorset, England

=== United States ===
- Weymouth, Massachusetts, a city
- Weymouth, Ohio, an unincorporated community
- Weymouth Township, New Jersey, a township
- Weymouth, Atlantic County, New Jersey, an unincorporated community
- Weymouth Hall, a historic mansion in Natchez, Mississippi

=== Elsewhere ===
- Weymouth, Tasmania, Australia
- Weymouth Bay, Queensland, Australia
- Weymouth, Nova Scotia, Canada
- Weymouth, New Zealand
- Weymouth, Barbados

== Other uses ==
- Weymouth railway station
- Weymouth F.C.
- Weymouth College
- HMS Weymouth, several ships
- 19294 Weymouth
- Weymouth New Testament

== People ==
- Adam Weymouth (born 1984), English travel writer
- Ceawlin Thynn, Viscount Weymouth (born 1974), British peer
- George Weymouth (c. 1585–c. 1612), English explorer
- George Alexis Weymouth (1936–2016), American artist
- George W. Weymouth (1850–1910), American politician
- Katharine Weymouth (born 1966), former publisher of The Washington Post
- Lally Weymouth (1943–2025), American journalist
- Ralph Weymouth (1917–2020), Vice Admiral of the United States Navy
- Richard Francis Weymouth (1822–1902), English Bible scholar
- Thomas Thynne, 1st Marquess of Bath (1734–1796), 3rd Viscount Weymouth
- Tina Weymouth (born 1950), American musician
- Yann Weymouth (born 1941), American architect

== See also ==
- Weymouth bit
- Double bridle or Weymouth bridle
- Weymouth Wildcats
- Weymouth Harbour (disambiguation)
- Waymouth
