= Sarah Mergenthaler =

American sports sailor (born 1979)

Personal information
- Nationality: American
- Born: April 21, 1979 (age 46) Red Bank, New Jersey, United States

Sport
- Sport: Sailing
- Event: Women's 470
- Club: Red Bank Sailing Club

Achievements and titles
- Olympic finals: 2008 Beijing – 12th place

Sarah Mergenthaler (born April 21, 1979) is an American sports sailor.

She was born in Red Bank, New Jersey, United States, and started sailing at the age of seven at a club in Red Bank.

Raised in Colts Neck Township, Mergenthaler graduated from Marlboro High School, where she played basketball and soccer and was placekicker on the football team, the first woman to play for the school's team.

At the 2008 Summer Olympics in Beijing, she competed in the women's 470 alongside Amanda Clark, finishing in 12th position.
