= Oleksiy Borysov =

Ukrainian sailor

Oleksiy Borysov (born June 1, 1983 in Sevastopol) is a Ukrainian born Russian sailor. He competed for Ukraine at the 2012 Summer Olympics in the Men's Finn class. In 2014, after the annexation of Sevastopol, Crimea to Russia, he received a Russian citizenship as Aleksey Borisov (Russian: Алексей Борисов).
