= Scott Flanigan =

Irish sailor

Scott Flanigan (born 22 December 1992) in Dublin is an Irish sailor. He competed at the 2012 Summer Olympics in the 470 class.
