= Valeriy Kudryashov =

Ukrainian sailor

Valeriy Valeriyovych Kudriashov (Ukrainian: Валерій Валерійович Кудряшов) is a Ukrainian sailor. He competed at the 2012 Summer Olympics in the Men's Laser class.
