= Kalle Bask =

Finnish sailor

Kalle Bask is a Finnish sailor. He competed at the 2012 Summer Olympics in the 49er class, with helmsman Lauri Lehtinen.
