= Sigrid Rondelez =

Belgian windsurfer (born 1971)

Personal information
- Nickname: Sigi
- Nationality: Belgium
- Born: 17 March 1971 (age 55) Bruges, Belgium
- Height: 1.72 m (5 ft 7 1/2 in)
- Weight: 61 kg (134 lb)

Sailing career
- Sport: Sailing
- Club: Side Shore Surfers de Panne
- Coached by: Casper Bouman
- Class: Sailboard

Sigrid Rondelez (born 17 March 1971) is a Belgian windsurfer, who specialized in Mistral and Neil Pryde RS:X classes. She represented Belgium in three editions of the Olympic Games (2000, 2004, and 2012), and was a top eight finalist at the 2003 ISAF Sailing World Championships in Cádiz, Spain. Before her sporting career ended in 2012, Rondelez trained for Side Shore Surfers Club in De Panne under her head coach, former Dutch windsurfer, and 2008 Olympian Casper Bouman.

Rondelez made her official debut at the 2000 Summer Olympics in Sydney, where she placed sixteenth in women's Mistral sailboard with a net score of 127 points. At the 2004 Summer Olympics in Athens, Rondelez competed again in the same program after finishing eighth from the World Championships in Cádiz. She posted a grade of 148 net points to end the eleven-race opening series with an eighteenth-place finish.

Eight years after competing in her last Olympics, Rondelez qualified for her third Belgian team, as a 36-year-old, in the RS:X class at the 2012 Summer Olympics in London by receiving a berth from the ISAF Sailing World Championships in Perth, Western Australia. Rondelez missed a chance to sail in the medal race with a seventeenth-place finish after ten opening rounds, accumulating a net score of 150 points.
