= Sailing at the 2012 Summer Olympics – Women's 470 =

Women's 470 at the Games of the XXX Olympiad
- Silver medalists Hannah Mills & Saskia Clark on Weymouth Carnival Day on 15 August 2012
- Venue: Weymouth and Portland National Sailing Academy
- Dates: 3–10 August
- Competitors: 40 from 20 nations
- Teams: 20 (boats)

Medalists
1st place, gold medalist(s)		Jo Aleh; Polly Powrie	New Zealand
2nd place, silver medalist(s)		Hannah Mills; Saskia Clark	Great Britain
3rd place, bronze medalist(s)		Lisa Westerhof; Lobke Berkhout	Netherlands

The women's 470 was one of ten sailing event on the Sailing at the 2012 Summer Olympics program, and took place at Weymouth and Portland National Sailing Academy. The racing took place on Nothe, West, and South course locations all of which were outside Portland Harbour. 40 sailors representing 20 nations across 20 dinghies competed in the ten scheduled races, with the top ten boats overall from this qualifying series competing in a medal race, where each position scored double points. It was the seventh appearance of the 470 at the Olympics as a women's only event since the first in 1988, and the tenth since the class' first Olympic appearance in 1976.

The medal race was held on Friday 10 August, 2012. The race and in turn gold medal was won by New Zealand's Jo Aleh and Polly Powrie, taking the lead back from Hannah Mills and Saskia Clark of Great Britain with both teams tied on points going into the medal race, in which the British pair finished 9th. Lisa Westerhof and Lobke Berkhout of the Netherlands took bronze.

== Schedule ==
●	Practice race	●	Race on Portland	●	Race on Nothe	●	Race on West	●	Race on South	●	Medal race on Nothe

Date	July						August												
Date	26 Thu	27 Fri	28 Sat	29 Sun	30 Mon	31 Tue	1 Wed	2 Thu	3 Fri		4 Sat	5 Sun	6 Mon	7 Tue	8 Wed	9 Thu	10 Fri	11 Sat	12 Sun
Women's 470								●	● ●	● ●	●	●	Spare day	● ●	● ●	Spare day	MR		

== Course areas and course configurations ==
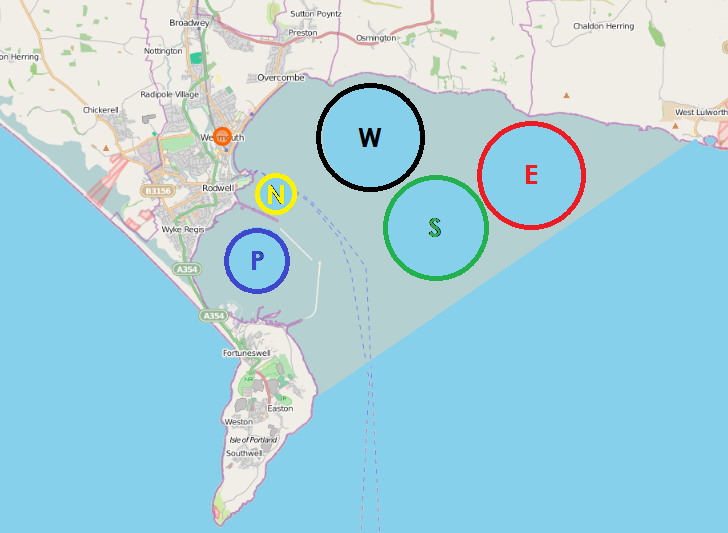
Course areas: Portland (P) Nothe (N) West (W) / South (S) East (E)

For the 470 course areas Portland, Nothe, West, and South were used. The location (50° 35.19’ N, 02° 26.54’ W) points to the center Portland course area, the location (50° 36.18’ N 02° 25.98’ W) points to the center of the Nothe course area, the location (50° 37.18’ N 02° 23.55’ W) points to the center of the West course area and the location (50° 35.71’ N 02° 22.08’ W) points to the center of the South course area. The target time for the course was 60 minutes for the races and 30 minutes for the medal race. The race management could choose from many course configurations.

== Results ==
Results of individual races
Pos	Helmsman	Country	I	II	III	IV	V	VI	VII	VIII	IX	X	MR	Tot	Pts
Gold medal	Jo Aleh; Polly Powrie	New Zealand	2	6	2	5	10	4	1	1	2	18^{†}	2	53.0	35.0
Silver medal	Hannah Mills; Saskia Clark	Great Britain	6	1	4	6	1	6	5	2	8^{†}	2	18	59.0	51.0
Bronze medal	Lisa Westerhof; Lobke Berkhout	Netherlands	1	8	6	4	2	18	4	3	20^{†}	6	12	84.0	64.0
4	Camille Lecointre; Mathilde Géron	France	10	17^{†}	1	8	12	3	7	6	3	5	10	82.0	65.0
5	Giulia Conti; Giovanna Micol	Italy	8	10	18^{†}	2	3	1	16	16	6	7	4	91.0	73.0
6	Fernanda Oliveira; Ana Barbachan	Brazil	11	5	14^{†}	1	6	10	10	9	5	4	14	89.0	75.0
7	Elise Rechichi; Belinda Stowell	Australia	14	7	3	DSQ 21^{†}	9	7	9	13	4	1	16	104.0	83.0
8	Kathrin Kadelbach; Friederike Belcher	Germany	19^{†}	2	7	13	15	5	6	5	14	11	6	103.0	84.0
9	Amanda Clark; Sarah Lihan	United States	7	3	5	7	19	20^{†}	3	8	17	9	20	118.0	98.0
10	Tara Pacheco; Berta Betanzos	Spain	15	14	8	16^{†}	13	8	11	4	7	13	8	117.0	101.0
11	Wang Xiaoli; Huang Xufeng	China	18	18	9	12	8	19^{†}	2	17	1	12		116.0	97.0
12	Agnieszka Skrzypulec; Jolanta Ogar	Poland	13	13	20^{†}	17	7	2	18	7	11	10		118.0	98.0
13	María Fernanda Sesto; Consuelo Monsegur	Argentina	16	19^{†}	19	3	5	12	14	11	15	3		117.0	98.0
14	Ai Kondo; Wakako Tabata	Japan	9	4	17	19	11	9	13	DSQ 21^{†}	13	8		124.0	103.0
15	Gil Cohen; Vered Bouskila	Israel	3	DSQ 21^{†}	10	18	4	14	12	15	12	17		126.0	105.0
16	Henriette Koch; Lene Sommer	Denmark	5	12	16^{†}	10	14	16	15	10	9	15		122.0	106.0
17	Enia Ninčević; Romana Župan	Croatia	4	16	13	11	20^{†}	11	8	19	19	14		135.0	115.0
18	Tina Mrak; Teja Černe	Slovenia	12	9	12	14	17^{†}	17	17	14	16	16		144.0	127.0
19	Lisa Ericson; Astrid Gabrielsson	Sweden	17	11	11	9	16	15	19	12	18	20^{†}		148.0	128.0
20	Lara Vadlau; Eva-Maria Schimak	Austria	20^{†}	15	15	15	18	13	20	18	10	19		163.0	143.0

Scoring system: low-point system; Source:
Legend: – Qualified for medal race(s); DSQ – Disqualified; † – Discarded race not counted in the overall result;

== Daily standings ==
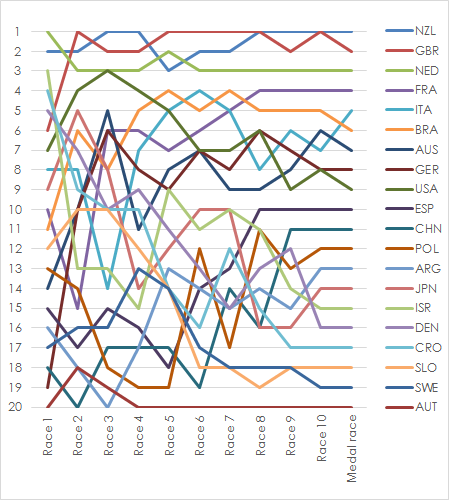
Graph showing the daily standings in the Women's 470 during the 2012 Summer Olympics
