= Wang Xiaoli (sailor) =

Chinese sailor (born 1982)

Xiaoli Wang (12 May 1982, Binzhou) is a Chinese sports sailor. At the 2012 Summer Olympics, she competed in the Women's 470 class. She and team-mate Huang Xufeng finished in 11th place. At the 2016 Olympics, she teamed with Huang Lizhu, finishing in 16th place.

At the 2013 470 World Championships, Wang and Huang Xufeng became the first Chinese team to win a medal at the 470 World Championships, winning a bronze medal. The team were coached by Kevin Burnham and Nick Drougas.
