= David Wright (sailor) =

Canadian sailor

David John Wynne Wright (born November 3, 1981, in Montréal) is a Canadian sailor.

He won the ICSA Men's Singlehanded National Championship in 2002. Other competitions include the 2011 Pan American Games – Laser event, the 2011 ISAF Sailing World Championships – Laser event, and the 2012 Summer Olympics – Men's Laser event.
