= Irina Konstantinova =

Bulgarian windsurfer (born 1976)

Personal information
- Full name: Irina Emilova Konstantinova-Bontemps
- Nationality: Bulgaria
- Born: 10 July 1976 (age 50) Sofia, Bulgaria
- Height: 1.65 m (5 ft 5 in)
- Weight: 57 kg (126 lb)

Sailing career
- Sport: Sailing
- Club: ASPTT Nantes
- Coached by: Jean-Claude Menard
- Class: Sailboard

Irina Emilova Konstantinova-Bontemps (Bulgarian: Ирина Емилова Константинова-Бонтепс; born 10 July 1976 in Sofia) is a Bulgarian windsurfer, who specialized in Neil Pryde RS:X class. She represented Bulgaria in four editions of the Olympic Games (2000, 2004, 2008, and 2012), and has also placed outside the top ten in both Mistral and RS:X classes. In 2006, Konstantinova married French windsurfer, two-time world champion, and later 2008 Olympic silver medalist Julien Bontemps before she relocated to France, and trained for ASPTT Nantes. As of September 2013, Konstantinova is ranked no. 88 in the world for the sailboard class by the International Sailing Federation.

Konstantinova made her official debut at the 2000 Summer Olympics in Sydney, where she placed twenty-fourth in women's Mistral sailboard with a net score of 193 points. At the 2004 Summer Olympics in Athens, Konstantinova posted a remarkable grade of 152 to pull off a nineteenth-place effort in the same program.

At the 2008 Summer Olympics in Beijing, Konstantinova narrowly missed out on the medal race by four points, as she finished twelfth overall in the newly introduced RS:X class with a net score of 101.

Twelve years after competing in her first Olympics, Konstantinova qualified for her fourth Bulgarian team, as a 36-year-old, in the RS:X class at the 2012 Summer Olympics in London by receiving a berth from the ISAF Sailing World Championships in Perth, Western Australia. Delivering a mediocre effort in the opening races, Konstantinova dropped to twenty-second place overall in a fleet of twenty-six sailors with a net score of 180 points.
