= Giuseppe Angilella =

Italian sailor (born 1984)

Personal information
- Born: 27 August 1984 (age 42) Palermo

Sport
- Country: Italy
- Sport: Sailing

Giuseppe Angilella (born 27 August 1984) is an Italian sailor. He competed at the 2012 Summer Olympics in the 49er class, finishing ninth.
