= Daniel Birgmark =

Swedish sailor

Personal information
- Nationality: Sweden
- Born: 5 March 1973 (age 53) Gothenburg, Sweden

Sailing career
- Sport: Sailing
- Club: Royal Gothenburg Yacht Club
- Classes: Finn, Laser

Daniel Birgmark (born 5 March 1973 in Gothenburg) is a sailor representing Sweden at Sailing at the 2008 Summer Olympics – Finn class and Sailing at the 2012 Summer Olympics – Finn class. He studied Marine Biology at the Gothenburg University in Sweden.
