= Byron Kokkalanis =

Greek windsurfer (born 1985)

Medal record

Men's windsurfing

Representing Greece

World Championships
Bronze medal – third place	2013 Armação dos Búzios, Brazil	RS:X

European Championships
Gold medal – first place	2013 Brest, France	RS:X
Silver medal – second place	2012 Madeira, Portugal	RS:X
Silver medal – second place	2013 Burgas, Bulgaria	RS:X
Silver medal – second place	2013 Sopot, Poland	RS:X

Byron Kokkalanis (Greek: Βύρων Κοκκαλάνης; born 19 August 1985 in Athens), also spelled Vyron, is a Greek windsurfer of partly Filipino ancestry. He started sailing in 1997 in the Mistral class and 3 years later he won the Mistral Junior World Championship, his first international regatta. He took the fifth place at the 2016 Summer Olympics and the sixth place at the 2012 London Olympic Games. At the 2020 Tokyo Olympic Games he finished in the 11th place.

He was also fifth at the 2012 RS:X World Championships., third at the 2013 RS:X World Championship, first at the 2013 RS:X European Championship.
