= Li Ling (sailor) =

Chinese windsurfer

Personal information
- Nationality: China
- Born: 14 March 1986 (age 40) Binzhou, Shandong, China
- Height: 1.68 m (5 ft 6 in)
- Weight: 60 kg (132 lb)

Sailing career
- Sport: Sailing
- Club: Shandong Province Sailing Team
- Class: Sailboard

Li Ling (Chinese: 李玲; pinyin: Li Líng; born 14 March 1986 in Binzhou, Shandong) is a Chinese windsurfer, who specialized in Neil Pryde RS:X class. As of March 2013, Li is ranked no. 39 in the world for the sailboard class by the International Sailing Federation.

Li competed in the women's RS:X class at the 2012 Summer Olympics in London by receiving a berth from the World Championships in Cádiz, Spain. She finished fourteenth in a fleet of twenty-six sailors with an accumulated net score of 115, missing out on the top ten medal race by 25 points.
