= Matthias Miller (sailor) =

German sailor

Personal information
- Full name: Matthias Miller
- Nationality: Germany
- Born: 1981 or 1982 (age 44–45) Laupheim, Baden-Württemberg, Germany

Sailing career
- Sport: Sailing
- Class: Finn

Matthias Miller (born 1981 or 1982) is a German former sailor who specilised in the Finn class. He earned Germany a quota place at the 2012 Summer Olympics by finishing 20th at the 2012 Finn Gold Cup. However, Miller failed to meet the German Olympic Sports Confederation (DOSB) standard for qualification, as he failed to finish among the top 10 nations.
