= Brendan Casey =

Australian sailor

Brendan Casey (born 22 February 1977) is an Australian sailor. He competed at the 2012 Summer Olympics in the Men's Finn class.
