= Astrid Gabrielsson =

Swedish sailor

Astrid Elisabeth Gabrielsson (born 27 July 1989) is a Swedish sports sailor. At the 2012 Summer Olympics, she competed in the women's 470 class with Lisa Ericson.

Born in Gothenburg, Gabrielsson represents the Royal Gothenburg Yacht Club. In 2008, Gabrielsson and Ericson won bronze in the junior 470 world championships.
