= Alejandro Foglia =

Uruguayan sailor

Personal information
- Full name: Alejandro José Foglia Costa
- Born: January 30, 1984 (age 41); Montevideo, Uruguay
- Height: 6 ft 2 in (1.88 m)
- Weight: 13 st (83 kg)

Sailing career
- Club: Yacht Club Punta del Este

Alejandro José Foglia Costa (Note: In this Spanish name, the first or paternal surname is Foglia and the second or maternal family name is Costa.) (born 30 January 1984, in Montevideo) is a Uruguayan sailor in the Laser and Finn classes.

He competed in four Summer Olympics for his native South American country: 2004, 2008, 2012 and 2016, and in two Pan American Games: 2007 and 2011.

He was named Uruguay's flagbearer for the 2008 Summer Olympics.

== Results ==
Olympic Games

- 2004: 34th
- 2008: 17th
- 2012: 8th
- 2016: 19th

Pan American Games

- 2007: ?
- 2011: 4th

ISAF Sailing World Championships

- 2007: 18th
- 2011: 52nd

== Personal life ==
He is brother of Andrea Foglia another Uruguayan sailor

== Notes ==
Olympic Games
Preceded by Serrana Fernández	Flagbearer for Uruguay; Beijing 2008	Succeeded by Rodolfo Collazo
