= Tokoyo =

Tokoyo may refer to:

- Tokoyo no kuni a realm in Japanese mythology
- Tokoyo (fictional character), the protagonist of a folk tale

See also:

- Tokyo, the capital of Japan
