= Weymouth Harbour =

Weymouth Harbour may refer to:

- Weymouth Harbour, Dorset
- Weymouth Harbour, Nova Scotia
