= Niclas Düring =

Swedish sailor

Niclas Felix Düring (born 6 April 1990) is a Swedish sailor. He competed at the 2012 Summer Olympics in the 49er class. He currently pursues a M.Sc in Industrial Engineering and Management at Chalmers University of Technology in Gothenburg.

Düring was born in Sundbyberg, Sweden on 6 April 1990.
