= Yuki Sunaga =

Japanese windsurfer (born 1980)

Personal information
- Nationality: Japan
- Born: 28 December 1980 (age 45) Sakado, Saitama, Japan
- Height: 1.71 m (5 ft 7 1/2 in)
- Weight: 62 kg (137 lb)

Sailing career
- Sport: Sailing
- Club: Miki House
- Class: Sailboard

Yuki Sunaga (須長 由季, Sunaga Yuki; born 28 December 1980 in Sakado, Saitama) is a Japanese windsurfer, who specialized in Neil Pryde RS:X class. As of September 2013, Sunaga is ranked no. 53 in the world for the sailboard class by the International Sailing Federation.

Sunaga competed in the women's RS:X class at the 2012 Summer Olympics in London by finishing thirty-third and receiving a berth from the ISAF World Championships in Perth, Western Australia. Struggling to attain a top position in the opening series, Sunaga accumulated a net score of 180 points for a twenty-first-place finish in a fleet of twenty-six windsurfers.
