= Friederike Belcher =

German sports sailor

Friederike Belcher (née Ziegelmayer, born 6 March 1982 in Berlin) is a German sailor. She competed in the 2012 Summer Olympics, in the Women's 470 class.

She is married to multiple Olympic gold medalist Australian sailor Mathew Belcher and is the granddaughter of sailing bronze medalist Rolf Mulka. Her father's company "Ziegelmayer" based in Hamburg, Germany is one of the primary boatbuilders for the 470 class.
