= Florian Raudaschl =

Austrian sailor (born 1978)

Florian Raudaschl (born 23 May 1978 in Bad Ischl) is an Austrian sailor. He competed at the 2012 Summer Olympics in the Men's Finn class.
