= Erik Storck =

American sailor

Erik Storck is an American sailor. He competed at the 2012 Summer Olympics in the 49er class.
