= Simon Grotelüschen =

German sailor

Simon Grotelüschen (born 3 October 1986 in Lübeck) is a German sailor, who competes in the Laser class. He finished sixth at the 2012 Summer Olympics.

He studied medicine at the University of Kiel.
