= Peter Lang (sailor, born 1989) =

Danish sailor (born 1989)

Personal information
- Born: 12 June 1989 (age 37) Vejle, Denmark

Sailing career
- Sport: Sailing
- Club: Kolding Sejlklub
Medal record
Men's dinghy sailing
Representing Denmark
Olympic Games
Bronze medal – third place	2012 London	49er

Peter Ørsted Lang (born 12 June 1989) is a Danish Olympic bronze medallist sailor in the 49er class.

Born in Vejle, Lang represents Kolding Sejlklub. Together with Allan Nørregaard, he won bronze at the 2012 Summer Olympics in the 49er class. In 2014, he won the 49er event at the 2014 US Sailing's Miami Olympic Classes Regatta together with Jonas Warrer.
