= Shi Jian (sailor) =

Chinese sailor (born 1988)

Shi Jian (born January 11, 1988, in Changzhou) is a Chinese sailor. He competed at the 2012 Summer Olympics in the Men's Laser class finishing in 43rd.
