= Henriette Koch =

Danish sailor

Henriette Koch (born 3 April 1985) is a Danish sports sailor.

She was born in Allerød, Denmark. At the 2012 Summer Olympics, she competed in the women's 470 class where, alongside crewmate Lene Sommer, she finished 16th.
