= Nikola Girke =

Canadian sailor and windsurfer

Personal information
- Born: December 30, 1977 (age 48) Grande Prairie, Alberta, Canada
- Height: 1.78 m (5 ft 10 in)

Sport
- Sport: Sailing
- Events: RS:X, 470, Nacra 17
- Updated on 8 December 2019

Nikola Girke (born December 30, 1977, in Grande Prairie, Alberta) is a Canadian sailor and a five-time Olympian. She is amongst only a few elite athletes who have made the transition from one sport to another and has achieved a top 10 in the world across three different sport disciplines. She finished 13th at the 2004 Summer Olympics in the 470, then switched to RSX windsurfing and placed 17th at the 2008 Summer Olympics. At the 2012 Summer Olympics she finished 10th in the RS:X. Girke was named to Canada's 2016 Olympic team to compete in the 2016 Summer Olympics in Rio de Janeiro, as part of the Nacra 17 with Luke Ramsay. The duo placed 15th. Girke also competed in windsurfing at both the 2011 Pan American Games and the 2015 Pan American Games placing 4th and 6th respectively. Nikola holds a degree from UBC in Human Kinetics and is a Certified Executive and Emotional Intelligence coach.

She represented Canada for the fifth time at the 2020 Summer Olympics.

Year	Venue	Equipment	Event	Pos.	Notes
2004	Athens	470	Female 2 person dinghy	13	
2008	Qingdoa	RS:X	Female Windsurfing	17	
2012	Weymouth	RS:X	Female Windsurfing	10	
2016	Rio	Nacra 17	Mixed - Multihull	15	
2020	Tokyo	RS:X	Female Windsurfing	23	
