= Francisco Andrade =

Portuguese sailor (born 1980)

Francisco Catalão Rebelo Andrade (born 6 August 1980 in Rio de Janeiro, Brazil) is a Portuguese sailor. He competed at the 2008 and 2012 Summer Olympics in the 49er class, finishing in 11th and 8th place respectively.
