= Gordon Cook =

Canadian sailor

- Born: December 3, 1978 (age 47); Toronto
- Parent: Stephen Cook

Gordon Cook (born December 3, 1978, in Toronto) is a two-time Canadian Olympic sailor. He sails for the Royal Canadian Yacht Club. He is the son of computer scientist Stephen Cook.

Cook is a graduate of the Engineering Physics program at Queen's University. At Queen's University, he also met his 2012 Olympic team partner Ben Remocker, where they were members of the university sailing team. Cook and Remocker became the first Canadians to sail a 49er in an Olympic Regatta at the 2008 Beijing Olympics, where they finished 14th.

In 2009 Cook partnered up with West Vancouver sailor Hunter Lowden and the two campaigned together for the 2012 Olympic games. While Cook and Lowden did not make the first round of qualifications at the 2011 ISAF worlds in December 2011 they did qualify at the 2012 49er worlds in Croatia making Cook the only person ever to represent Canada twice in the 49er Class at the Olympic Games. Cook and Lowden came third in the first race of the 49 year class in the 2012 Olympic games, but did not qualify for the medal race.
