= Dionysios Dimou =

Greek sailor

Dionysios Dimou is a Greek sailor. He competed at the 2012 Summer Olympics in the 49er class.
