= Kathrin Kadelbach =

German sports sailor (born 1983)

Kathrin Kadelbach (born 1 August 1983 in Berlin) is a German sports sailor. At the 2012 Summer Olympics, she competed in the Women's 470 class.
