= Andrey Quintero =

Colombian sailor

Andrey Quintero (born August 17, 1985) is a Colombian sailor. He competed at the 2012 Summer Olympics in the Men's Laser class.
