= Ricardo Montemayor =

Mexican sailor (born 1991)

Ricardo Montemayor (born 23 December 1991 in Mexico D.F.) is a Mexican sailor. He competed at the 2012 Summer Olympics in the Men's Laser class, where he achieved a place of 38th out of 49. He studied Geological Engineering at the University of British Columbia.
