= Bernardo Freitas =

Portuguese sailor (born 1990)

Bernardo Freitas (born 18 February 1990, Cascais) is a Portuguese sailor. He competed at the 2012 Summer Olympics in the 49er class, finishing in 8th. In 2017-18, he was a crew member on Turn the Tide on Plastic in the Volvo Ocean Race.
