= Allan Nørregaard =

Danish sailor (born 1981)

Personal information
- Born: 19 March 1981 (age 45) Kolding, Denmark

Sailing career
- Sport: Sailing
Medal record
Men's dinghy sailing
Representing Denmark
Olympic Games
Bronze medal – third place	2012 London	49er
- Updated on 19 May 2013

Allan Nørregaard (born 19 March 1981) is a Danish sailor. Together with Peter Lang, he won bronze at the 2012 Summer Olympics in the 49er class.
