= Moana Delle =

German windsurfer

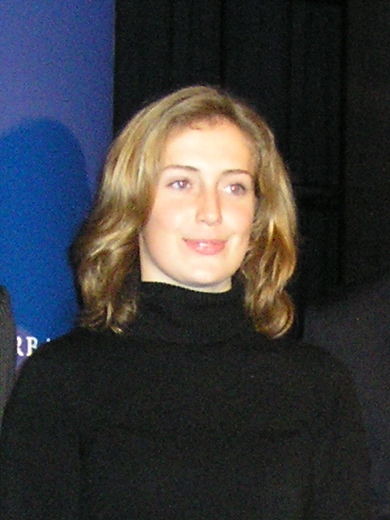
- 2007

Personal information
- Nationality: German
- Born: 7 March 1989 (age 37) Münster, Germany
- Height: 167 cm (5 ft 6 in)
- Weight: 57 kg (126 lb)

Sailing career
- Sport: Sailing
- Club: SC Bayer 05 Uerdingen
- Class(es): RS:X, Mistral

Moana Delle (born 7 March 1989 in Münster) is a German windsurfer. She finished 5th at the 2012 Summer Olympics in the sailboard class.
