= Lene Sommer =

Danish sailor

Lene Sommer (born 16 September 1985) is a Danish sports sailor.

She was born in Frederiksberg, Denmark, on 16 September 1985. At the 2012 Summer Olympics, she competed in the women's 470 class where, alongside crewmate Henriette Koch, she finished 16th.
