= Sarah Lihan =

American sports sailor (born 1988)

Sarah Lihan (born August 15, 1988) is an American sports sailor. She was born in Fort Lauderdale, Florida, United States.

At the 2012 Summer Olympics, she competed in the women's 470 class with Amanda Clark; the pair finished ninth.
