= Gong Lei (sailor) =

Chinese sailor

Gong Lei (Chinese: 宫磊; pinyin: Gōng Lěi, born 26 March 1983) is a Chinese sailor. He competed at the 2012 Summer Olympics in the Men's Finn class.
