= Trevor Moore (sailor) =

American sailor (born 1985, disappeared 2015)

- Born: Trevor Oakley Moore; August 13, 1985; Boston, Massachusetts, U.S.
- Disappeared: June 25, 2015 (aged 29); Miami, Florida, U.S.
- Status: Missing for 11 years and 3 days
- Sports career
- Sport: Sailing
- College team: Hobart and William Smith Colleges

Trevor Oakley Moore (born August 13, 1985) is an American sailor, born in Boston and raised in Scituate, Massachusetts.

Moore moved to Florida at the age of 6 and lived there until he was 14. He then moved full-time to Pomfret, VT with his father John Moore at the age of 14.

Moore was a three-time Intercollegiate Sailing Association (ICSA) All-American, in 2005, 2006, and 2007. He helped Hobart and William Smith Colleges sailing team win the Inter-Collegiate Sailing Association National Championships in both Coed Fleet Racing and Team Racing in 2005. He won the B Division for low-point scoring in the 2005 Nationals. Other top finishes include a runner-up 2nd-place finish in 2006 at the ICSA Singlehanded Men's National Championship, and runner-up 2nd-place finish at the ICSA National Championship Fleet Race in the A Division in 2007. He was named ICSA College Sailor of the Year in 2007.

In 2008, Moore attempted to qualify for the Olympics and finished in 4th place in the Olympic Trials for the Laser Standard Class. He had a passion for team racing and competed at many US Sailing Team Race National Championships for the Hinman Trophy. He was great coach to many young sailors in the Optimist & Laser Classes primarily, but also in the 420, 49er, 29er, and 49erFX.

He competed at the 2012 Summer Olympics in the 49er class. His boat was named "Wendy" after his late mother Wendy Moore, who died when he was in grade school.

== Disappearance ==
In late June 2015, Moore was reported missing from a reported boating accident in Miami. As of 2022, he has not been found. Moore’s family believe he perished at sea, and they have set up a foundation and scholarship in his memory.

== See also ==
- List of people who disappeared mysteriously at sea
