= Gianfranco Sibello =

Italian sailor

Gianfranco Sibello (born 4 October 1975) is an Italian sailor. He competed at the 2012 Summer Olympics in the 49er class.
