= Lisa Westerhof =

Dutch sailor (born 1981)

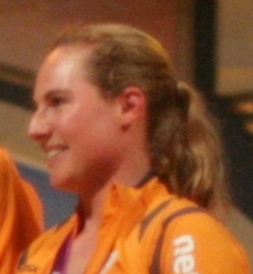
- Westerhof at Holland Heineken House 2012

Personal information
- Full name: Lisa Laetitia Westerhof
- Nationality: Dutch
- Born: 2 November 1981 (age 44) De Bilt, Netherlands
- Height: 1.67 m (5 ft 6 in)

Sailing career
- Sport: Sailing
- Class: 470 female
Medal record
Sailing
Representing Netherlands
Olympic Games
Bronze medal – third place	2012 Weymouth	Women's 470
470 World Championships
Gold medal – first place	2009 Copenhagen	Women's 470
Gold medal – first place	2010 The Hague	Women's 470
Silver medal – second place	2002 Cagliari	Women's 470
Bronze medal – third place	2012 Barcelona	Women's 470
Optimist World Championship
Gold medal – first place	1996 Langebaan	Optimist
- Updated on 13 February 2014

Lisa Laetitia Westerhof (born 2 November 1981, in De Bilt) is a sailor from the Netherlands. Westerhof represented her country at the Optimist World Championship in 1995 and 1996, becoming only the second girl to win the championship outright.

She sailed at the 2004 Summer Olympics in Athens. With crew Margriet Matthijsse took Westerhof ninth place as helmsman in the Dutch Women's 470. Westerhof's second Olympic appearance was during the 2012 Olympics in Weymouth again as helmsman in the Women's 470. Now with Lobke Berkhout as crew Westerhof won the bronze medal.

== Professional life ==
Westerhof lives in Scheveningen, studied economics at the Erasmus University in Rotterdam, and is a First Officer on the Boeing 737 for Air France KLM.
