= Teja Černe =

Slovenian sailor (born 1984)

Medal record

Sailing

Representing Slovenia

Mediterranean Games
Bronze medal – third place	2005 Almería	Women's 470

Teja Černe (born September 29, 1984) is a Slovenian competitive sailor. She was born in Koper. She competed at the 2004 Summer Olympics in Athens in the women's one person dinghy event, the Europe class. She competed at the 2012 Summer Olympics in London, in the women's 470, together with Tina Mrak.
