= Hannes Baumann =

German sailor

Personal information
- Nationality: Germany
- Born: 9 August 1982 (age 44) Bad Saarow-Pieskow, East Germany
- Height: 188 cm (6 ft 2 in)
- Weight: 77 kg (170 lb)

Sailing career
- Sport: Sailing
- Club: Norddeutscher Regatta Verein
- Classes: 49er, ILCA 7

Hannes Baumann (born 9 August 1982) is a German sailor. He competed at the 2012 Summer Olympics in the 49er class.

== Early life ==
Hannes Baumann was born in Bad Saarow-Pieskow. He started sailing at the age of 11 and started racing at 12. His favorite hobbies apart from sailing are : cycling, snowboarding, surfing. The person he admires the most is Robert Scheidt.
