= Angeliki Skarlatou =

Greek windsurfer (born 1976)

Personal information
- Nickname: Gelly
- Nationality: Greece
- Born: 28 January 1976 (age 50) Amaliada, Greece
- Height: 1.65 m (5 ft 5 in)
- Weight: 57 kg (126 lb)

Sailing career
- Sport: Sailing
- Club: Bouliagmeni Nautical Club
- Class: Sailboard

Angeliki "Gelly" Skarlatou (Greek: Αγγελική Σκαρλάτου; born 28 January 1976) is a Greek windsurfer, who specialized in Mistral and Neil Pryde RS:X classes. She represented Greece in four editions of the Olympic Games (1996, 2000, 2012, and 2016), and has earned numerous national and sporting titles, including gold medals at the Eurolymp Week, during her career. As of September 2013, she is ranked no. 40 in the world for the sailboard class by the International Sailing Federation.

Skarlatou made her official debut at the 1996 Summer Olympics in Atlanta, where she placed twenty-third in women's Mistral sailboard with a net score of 149 points. At the 2000 Summer Olympics in Sydney, Skarlatou posted a grade of 159 to improve her placement status with a twenty-first-place finish in the same program. In 2004, Skarlatou decided not to compete in her third Olympics for the host nation, and instead, completed a Bachelor of Arts degree in sports science at Athens University and a master's degree in marketing at Brunel University in London, United Kingdom.

Twelve years after competing in her last Olympics, Skarlatou qualified for her second Greek team, as a 36-year-old, in the RS:X class at the 2012 Summer Olympics by receiving a berth from the ISAF Sailing World Championships in Perth, Western Australia. Though she fell short of her slot for the medal rounds, Skarlatou achieved her best Olympic result with a sixteenth-place effort in a fleet of twenty-six sailors, accumulating a net score of 134 points.

At the 2016 Summer Olympics, she competed in the RS:X class again. She finished 19th with a net score of 171 points.
