= José Ruiz (sailor) =

Venezuelan sailor (born 1980)

José Ruiz Durango (born 22 January 1980 in Maracaibo) is a Venezuelan sailor. He competed at the 2008 and 2012 Summer Olympics in the Men's Laser class.
