= Mike Pateniotis =

Greek sailor

Mike Pateniotis (born 5 February 1984) is a Greek sailor. He competed at the 2012 Summer Olympics in the 49er class, finishing in 20th place.

At the 2016 Summer Olympics, he competed in the Nacra 17 Mixed event. His partner was Sofia Bekatorou. They finished in 18th place.
