= Amanda Clark =

American sports sailor (born 1982)

Personal information
- Born: March 26, 1982 (age 44) Southampton, New York, U.S.
- Occupation(s): Full-time sailor and coach

Sport
- College team: Connecticut College

Amanda Clark (born March 26, 1982) is an American sailor. She was born in Southampton, New York.

In 2002, Clark won the ICSA Women’s Singlehanded National Championship in 2002.

She competed at the 2008 Summer Olympics in Beijing, People's Republic of China in the women's 470. Sailing alongside Sara Mergenthaler the pair finished in 12th position.

At the 2012 Summer Olympics, she competed in the women's 470 class with Sarah Lihan; the pair finished ninth.

Significant sailing achievements: Ranked No. 1 on the U.S. Sailing Team – 470 Women (2005–2008); Team Alternate/470 Women – 2004 Olympic Games; At 15, youngest female sailor to join the US Sailing Team in the Europe class.
