= Lisa Ericson =

Swedish sports sailor

Personal information
- Full name: Berit Lisa Matilda Ericson
- Nationality: Swedish
- Born: 9 May 1988 (age 37); Gothenburg, Sweden
- Height: 165 cm (5 ft 5 in)
- Weight: 60 kg (132 lb)

Sailing career
- Club: Royal Gothenburg Yacht Club

Berit Lisa Matilda Ericson (born 9 May 1988), known as Lisa Ericson (married name Örn), is a Swedish sports sailor. She competed in the Women's 470 class at the 2012 Summer Olympics and the 49er FX event at the 2016 Summer Olympics.
