= Huang Xufeng =

Chinese sports sailor

Xufeng Huang (Chinese: 黄绪峰; pinyin: Huáng Xùfēng, born 31 January 1984) is a Chinese sports sailor. At the 2012 Summer Olympics, she competed in the Women's 470 class, finishing in eleventh. She won gold at the China National Games in 2013 in the Women's 470 Class, and, at the World 470 Class at La Rochelle in 2013, she took the bronze medal.
