= Lauri Lehtinen (sailor) =

Finnish sailor

Personal information
- Nationality: Finnish
- Born: 25 March 1987 (age 39) Helsinki, Finland
- Height: 180 cm (5 ft 11 in)
- Weight: 74 kg (163 lb)

Sailing career
- Sport: Sailing
- Club: Nyländska Jaktklubben
- Class: 49er

Lauri Lehtinen (born 25 March 1987 in Helsinki) is a Finnish sailor. He competed at the 2012 Summer Olympics in the 49er class.
