= Jannicke Stålstrøm =

Norwegian windsurfer

Personal information
- Born: 7 September 1969 (age 57) Tønsberg, Norway
- Height: 168 cm (5 ft 6 in)
- Weight: 61 kg (134 lb)

Sport
- Sport: Windsurfing

Jannicke Stålstrøm (born 7 September 1969) is a Norwegian windsurfer. She was born in Tønsberg, and represents Horten Seilforening. She competed at the 2004, 2008 and 2012 Summer Olympics.
