= Jenna Hansen =

New Zealand sailor

Personal information
- Born: 25 October 1986 (age 39)

Sport
- Country: New Zealand
- Sport: Sailing

Jenna Hansen (born 25 October 1986) is a New Zealand competitive sailor. She competed at the 2012 Summer Olympics in London, in the women's Elliott 6m.
