= Hunter Lowden =

Canadian sailor

Hunter Lowden (born April 10, 1982) is a Canadian sailor. He competed at the 2012 Summer Olympics in the 49er class.
