= 2010–11 ISAF Sailing World Cup =

Event title
- Edition: 3rd
- Dates: 12 December 2010 – 22 June 2011
- Yachts: 2.4 Metre, 470, 49er, Elliott 6m, Finn, Laser, Laser Radial, RS:X, SKUD 18, Sonar, Star

The 2010–11 ISAF Sailing World Cup was a series of sailing regattas staged during 2010–11 season. The series featured boats which feature at the Olympics and Paralympics.

== Regattas ==
2010–11 regattas

Date	Regatta	City	Country
12–18 December 2010	Sail Melbourne	Melbourne	Australia
23–29 January 2011	Miami OCR	Miami	United States
2–9 April 2011	Trofeo Princesa Sofía	Palma	Spain
22–29 April 2011	Semaine Olympique Française	Hyères	France
24–29 May 2011	Delta Lloyd Regatta	Medemblik	Netherlands
5–11 June 2011	Sail for Gold	Weymouth	United Kingdom
18–22 June 2011	Kiel Week	Kiel	Germany

== Results ==
=== 2.4 Metre ===
Regatta	Winner	Country	Ref
Melbourne	Matthew Bugg	Australia	
Miami	Damien Seguin	France	
Palma	Thierry Schmitter	Netherlands	
Hyères	Damien Seguin	France	
Medemblik	Thierry Schmitter	Netherlands	
Weymouth	Damien Seguin	France	
Kiel	Megan Pascoe	Great Britain	

=== Men's 470 ===
Regatta	Winners	Country	Ref
Melbourne	Mathew Belcher; Malcolm Page	Australia	
Miami	Nic Asher; Elliot Willis	Great Britain	
Palma	Nicolas Charbonnier; Jérémie Mion	France	
Hyères	Pierre Leboucher; Vincent Garos	France	
Medemblik	Mathew Belcher; Malcolm Page	Australia	
Weymouth	Pierre Leboucher; Vincent Garos	France	
Kiel	Mathew Belcher; Malcolm Page	Australia	

=== Women's 470 ===
Regatta	Winners	Country	Ref
Melbourne	Kathrin Kadelbach; Friederike Belcher	Germany	
Miami	Ingrid Petitjean; Nadège Douroux	France	
Palma	Jo Aleh; Bianca Barbarich-Bacher	New Zealand	
Hyères	Tara Pacheco; Berta Betanzos	Spain	
Medemblik	Lisa Westerhof; Lobke Berkhout	Netherlands	
Weymouth	Jo Aleh; Polly Powrie	New Zealand	
Kiel	Erin Maxwell; Isabelle Farrar	United States	

=== 49er ===
Regatta	Winners	Country	Ref
Melbourne	Nico Delle Karth; Nikolaus Resch	Austria	
Miami	John Pink; Richard Peacock	Great Britain	
Palma	Emmanuel Dyen; Stéphane Christidis	France	
Hyères	Pietro Sibello; Gianfranco Sibello	Italy	
Medemblik	Stephen Morrison; Ben Rhodes	Great Britain	
Weymouth	Nathan Outteridge; Iain Jensen	Australia	
Kiel	Tobias Schadewaldt; Hannes Baumann	Germany	

=== Women's Elliott 6m ===
Regatta	Winners	Country	Ref
Miami	Claire Leroy; Marie Riou; Élodie Bertrand	France	
Palma	Sally Barkow; Alana O'Reilly; Elizabeth Kratzig Burnham	United States	
Hyères	Lucy MacGregor; Kate MacGregor; Annie Lush	Great Britain	
Medemblik	Renee Groeneveld; Annemieke Bes; Mijke Lievens	Netherlands	
Weymouth	Anna Tobias; Molly O'Bryan Vandemoer; Deborah Capozzi	United States	
Kiel	Ekaterina Skudina; Elena Syuzeva; Elena Vorobeva	Russia	

=== Men's Finn ===
Regatta	Winner	Country	Ref
Melbourne	Ben Ainslie	Great Britain	
Miami	Giles Scott	Great Britain	
Palma	Ben Ainslie	Great Britain	
Hyères	Ben Ainslie	Great Britain	
Medemblik	Edward Wright	Great Britain	
Weymouth	Ben Ainslie	Great Britain	
Kiel	Edward Wright	Great Britain	

=== Men's Laser ===
Regatta	Winner	Country	Ref
Melbourne	Nick Thompson	Great Britain	
Miami	Rasmus Myrgren	Sweden	
Palma	Paul Goodison	Great Britain	
Hyères	Javier Hernandez	Spain	
Medemblik	Tom Slingsby	Australia	
Weymouth	Tom Slingsby	Australia	
Kiel	Simon Grotelüschen	Germany	

=== Women's Laser Radial ===
Regatta	Winner	Country	Ref
Melbourne	Zhang Dongshuang	China	
Miami	Paige Railey	United States	
Palma	Sara Winther	New Zealand	
Hyères	Sara Winther	New Zealand	
Medemblik	Marit Bouwmeester	Netherlands	
Weymouth	Marit Bouwmeester	Netherlands	
Kiel	Paige Railey	United States	

=== Men's RS:X ===
Regatta	Winner	Country	Ref
Melbourne	Chan King Yin	Hong Kong	
Miami	Dorian van Rijsselberghe	Netherlands	
Palma	Dorian van Rijsselberghe	Netherlands	
Hyères	Piotr Myszka	Poland	
Medemblik	Lee Tae-hoon	South Korea	
Weymouth	Nick Dempsey	Great Britain	
Kiel	Przemysław Miarczyński	Poland	

=== Women's RS:X ===
Regatta	Winner	Country	Ref
Melbourne	Huali Zhu	China	
Miami	Marina Alabau	Spain	
Palma	Marina Alabau Neira	Spain	
Hyères	Blanca Manchón	Spain	
Medemblik	Ling Li	China	
Weymouth	Marina Alabau Neira	Spain	
Kiel	Jessica Crisp	Australia	

=== SKUD 18 ===
Regatta	Winners	Country	Ref
Melbourne	Alexandra Rickham; Niki Birrell	Great Britain	
Miami	Scott Whitman; Julia Dorsett	United States	
Hyères	Alexandra Rickham; Niki Birrell	Great Britain	
Weymouth	Daniel Fitzgibbon; Liesl Tesch	Australia	

=== Sonar ===
Regatta	Winners	Country	Ref
Miami	John Robertson; Hannah Stodel; Steve Thomas	Great Britain	
Hyères	Bruno Jourdren; Eric Flageul; Nicolas Vimont-Vicary	France	
Weymouth	John Robertson; Hannah Stodel; Steve Thomas	Great Britain	

=== Men's Star ===
Regatta	Winners	Country	Ref
Miami	Robert Scheidt; Bruno Prada	Brazil	
Palma	Iain Percy; Andrew Simpson	Great Britain	
Hyères	Robert Scheidt; Bruno Prada	Brazil	
Medemblik	Robert Scheidt; Bruno Prada	Brazil	
Weymouth	Robert Scheidt; Bruno Prada	Brazil	
Kiel	Flavio Marazzi; Enrico De Maria	Switzerland	
