= 2011–12 ISAF Sailing World Cup =

Event title
- Edition: 4th
- Dates: 6 November 2011 – 20 June 2012
- Yachts: 2.4 Metre, 470, 49er, Elliott 6m, Finn, Laser, Laser Radial, RS:X, SKUD 18, Sonar, Star

The 2011–12 ISAF Sailing World Cup was a series of sailing regattas staged during 2011–12 season. The series featured boats which feature at the Olympics and Paralympics.

== Regattas ==
2011–12 regattas

Date	Regatta	City	Country
6–12 November 2011	Sail Melbourne	Melbourne	Australia
22–28 January 2012	Miami OCR	Miami	United States
31 March – 7 April 2012	Trofeo Princesa Sofía	Palma	Spain
20–27 April 2012	Semaine Olympique Française	Hyères	France
22–26 May 2012	Delta Lloyd Regatta	Medemblik	Netherlands
4–9 June 2012	Sail for Gold	Weymouth	United Kingdom
16–20 June 2012	Kiel Week	Kiel	Germany

== Results ==
=== 2.4 Metre ===
Regatta	Winner	Country	Ref
Melbourne	Matthew Bugg	Australia	
Miami	Damien Seguin	France	
Palma	Thierry Schmitter	Netherlands	
Hyères	Damien Seguin	France	
Medemblik	Thierry Schmitter	Netherlands	
Weymouth	Thierry Schmitter	Netherlands	
Kiel	Damien Seguin	France	

=== Men's 470 ===
Regatta	Winners	Country	Ref
Melbourne	Stuart McNay; Graham Biehl	United States	
Miami	Mathew Belcher; Malcolm Page	Australia	
Palma	Mathew Belcher; Malcolm Page	Australia	
Hyères	Mathew Belcher; Malcolm Page	Australia	
Medemblik	Ger Owens; Scott Flanigan	Ireland	
Weymouth	Mathew Belcher; Malcolm Page	Australia	
Kiel	Ferdinand Gerz; Patrick Follmann	Germany	

=== Women's 470 ===
Regatta	Winners	Country	Ref
Melbourne	Elise Rechichi; Belinda Stowell	Australia	
Miami	Lisa Westerhof; Lobke Berkhout	Netherlands	
Palma	Giulia Conti; Giovanna Micol	Italy	
Hyères	Lisa Westerhof; Lobke Berkhout	Netherlands	
Weymouth	Jo Aleh; Polly Powrie	New Zealand	
Kiel	Annika Bochmann; Elisabeth Panuschka	Germany	

=== 49er ===
Regatta	Winners	Country	Ref
Melbourne	Nathan Outteridge; Iain Jensen	Australia	
Miami	Nico Delle Karth; Nikolaus Resch	Austria	
Palma	Jonas Warrer; Søren Hansen	Denmark	
Hyères	Emmanuel Dyen; Stéphane Christidis	France	
Weymouth	Nathan Outteridge; Iain Jensen	Australia	
Kiel	Tobias Schadewaldt; Hannes Baumann	Germany	

=== Women's Elliott 6m ===
Regatta	Winners	Country	Ref
Miami	Lucy MacGregor; Kate MacGregor; Annie Lush	Great Britain	
Palma	Anna Tobias; Molly O'Bryan Vandemoer; Deborah Capozzi	United States	
Hyères	Anna Tobias; Molly O'Bryan Vandemoer; Deborah Capozzi	United States	
Weymouth	Olivia Price; Nina Curtis; Lucinda Whitty	Australia	

=== Men's Finn ===
Regatta	Winner	Country	Ref
Melbourne	Oleksiy Borisov	Ukraine	
Miami	Zach Railey	United States	
Palma	Ben Ainslie	Great Britain	
Hyères	Brendan Casey	Australia	
Medemblik	Caleb Paine	United States	
Weymouth	Giles Scott	Great Britain	
Kiel	Deniss Karpak	Estonia	

=== Men's Laser ===
Regatta	Winner	Country	Ref
Melbourne	Tom Slingsby	Australia	
Miami	Paul Goodison	Great Britain	
Palma	Simon Grotelüschen	Germany	
Hyères	Philipp Buhl	Germany	
Medemblik	Rutger van Schaardenburg	Netherlands	
Weymouth	Tom Slingsby	Australia	
Kiel	Philipp Buhl	Germany	

=== Women's Laser Radial ===
Regatta	Winner	Country	Ref
Melbourne	Xu Lijia	China	
Miami	Lijia Xu	China	
Palma	Alicia Cebrián	Spain	
Hyères	Lijia Xu	China	
Medemblik	Krystal Weir	Australia	
Weymouth	Alison Young	Great Britain	
Kiel	Tatiana Drozdovskaya	Belarus	

=== Men's RS:X ===
Regatta	Winner	Country	Ref
Melbourne	Jon-Paul Tobin	New Zealand	
Miami	Nick Dempsey	Great Britain	
Hyères	Julien Bontemps	France	
Medemblik	Shahar Tzuberi	Israel	
Weymouth	Dorian van Rijsselberghe	Netherlands	

=== Women's RS:X ===
Regatta	Winner	Country	Ref
Melbourne	Jessica Crisp	Australia	
Miami	Demita Vega	Mexico	
Hyères	Moana Delle	Germany	
Medemblik	Flavia Tartaglini	Italy	
Weymouth	Zofia Noceti-Klepacka	Poland	

=== SKUD 18 ===
Regatta	Winners	Country	Ref
Melbourne	Alexandra Rickham; Niki Birrell	Great Britain	
Miami	Daniel Fitzgibbon; Liesl Tesch	Australia	
Hyères	Daniel Fitzgibbon; Liesl Tesch	Australia	
Weymouth	Alexandra Rickham; Niki Birrell	Great Britain	

=== Sonar ===
Regatta	Winners	Country	Ref
Miami	Udo Hessels; Marcel van de Veen; Mischa Rossen	Netherlands	
Hyères	John Robertson; Hannah Stodel; Steve Thomas	Great Britain	
Medemblik	Bruno Jourdren; Eric Flageul; Nicolas Vimont-Vicary	France	
Weymouth	John Robertson; Hannah Stodel; Steve Thomas	Great Britain	

=== Men's Star ===
Regatta	Winners	Country	Ref
Miami	Robert Scheidt; Bruno Prada	Brazil	
Palma	Robert Scheidt; Bruno Prada	Brazil	
Hyères	Iain Percy; Andrew Simpson	Great Britain	
Weymouth	Peter O'Leary; David Burrows	Ireland	
Kiel	Johannes Polgar; Markus Koy	Germany	
