= 2009–10 ISAF Sailing World Cup =

Event title
- Edition: 2nd
- Dates: 14 December 2009 – 14 August 2010
- Yachts: 2.4 Metre, 470, 49er, Elliott 6m, Finn, Laser, Laser Radial, RS:X, SKUD 18, Sonar, Star

The 2008–09 ISAF Sailing World Cup was a series of sailing regattas staged during 2008–09 season. The series featured boats which feature at the Olympics and Paralympics.

== Regattas ==
2009–10 regattas

Date	Regatta	City	Country
14–19 December 2009	Sail Melbourne	Melbourne	Australia
24–30 January 2010	Miami OCR	Miami	United States
27 March – 2 April 2010	Trofeo Princesa Sofía	Palma	Spain
23–30 April 2010	Semaine Olympique Française	Hyères	France
26–30 May 2010	Delta Lloyd Regatta	Medemblik	Netherlands
19–23 June 2009	Kiel Week	Kiel	Germany
9–14 August 2009	Sail for Gold	Weymouth	United Kingdom

== Results ==
=== 2.4 Metre ===
Regatta	Winner	Country	Ref
Melbourne	Paul Tingley	Canada	
Miami	Paul Tingley	Canada	
Palma	Thierry Schmitter	Netherlands	
Hyères	Damien Seguin	France	
Medemblik	Damien Seguin	France	
Kiel	Heiko Kröger	Germany	
Weymouth	Damien Seguin	France	

=== Men's 470 ===
Regatta	Winners	Country	Ref
Melbourne	Mathew Belcher; Malcolm Page	Australia	
Miami	Anton Dahlberg; Sebastian Östling	Sweden	
Palma	Pierre Leboucher; Vincent Garos	France	
Hyères	Nicolas Charbonnier; Baptiste Meyer	France	
Medemblik	Nic Asher; Elliot Willis	Great Britain	
Kiel	Mathew Belcher; Malcolm Page	Australia	
Weymouth	Pierre Leboucher; Vincent Garos	France	

=== Women's 470 ===
Regatta	Winners	Country	Ref
Melbourne	Jo Aleh; Polly Powrie	New Zealand	
Miami	Amanda Clark; Sarah Chin	United States	
Palma	Giulia Conti; Giovanna Micol	Italy	
Hyères	Emmanuelle Rol; Hélène Defrance	France	
Medemblik	Giulia Conti; Giovanna Micol	Italy	
Kiel	Sarah Ayton; Saskia Clark	Great Britain	
Weymouth	Ai Kondo Yoshida; Wakako Kajimoto	Japan	

=== 49er ===
Regatta	Winners	Country	Ref
Melbourne	Nathan Outteridge; Iain Jensen	Australia	
Miami	Emmanuel Dyen; Stéphane Christidis	France	
Palma	Emmanuel Dyen; Stéphane Christidis	France	
Hyères	Paul Brotherton; Mark Asquith	Great Britain	
Medemblik	Nathan Outteridge; Iain Jensen	Australia	
Kiel	John Pink; Richard Peacock	Great Britain	
Weymouth	Nathan Outteridge; Iain Jensen	Australia	

=== Women's Elliott 6m ===
Regatta	Winners	Country	Ref
Miami	Anna Tobias; Molly O'Bryan Vandemoer; Deborah Capozzi	United States	
Palma	Renee Groeneveld; Annemieke Bes; Brechtje van der Werf	Netherlands	
Hyères	Silke Hahlbrock; Maren Hahlbrock; Kerstin Schult	Germany	
Medemblik	Anne-Claire le Berre; Myrtille Ponge; Alice Ponsar	France	
Kiel	Ekaterina Skudina; Irina Lotsmanova; Elena Syuzeva	Russia	

=== Finn ===
Regatta	Winner	Country	Ref
Melbourne	James Paterson	Australia	
Miami	Edward Wright	Great Britain	
Palma	Edward Wright	Great Britain	
Hyères	Marin Misura	Croatia	
Medemblik	Ivan Kljaković Gašpić	Croatia	
Kiel	Ivan Kljakovic Gaspic	Croatia	
Weymouth	Giles Scott	Great Britain	

=== Men's Laser ===
Regatta	Winner	Country	Ref
Melbourne	Mike Leigh	Canada	
Miami	Nick Thompson	Great Britain	
Palma	Javier Hernandez	Spain	
Hyères	Paul Goodison	Great Britain	
Medemblik	Tom Slingsby	Australia	
Kiel	Tom Slingsby	Australia	
Weymouth	Tom Slingsby	Australia	

=== Women's Laser Radial ===
Regatta	Winner	Country	Ref
Melbourne	Marit Bouwmeester	Netherlands	
Miami	Paige Railey	United States	
Palma	Tina Mihelić	Croatia	
Hyères	Ausra Mileviciute	Lithuania	
Medemblik	Marit Bouwmeester	Netherlands	
Kiel	Paige Railey	United States	
Weymouth	Marit Bouwmeester	Netherlands	

=== Men's RS:X ===
Regatta	Winner	Country	Ref
Melbourne	Nicolas Lozano	Colombia	
Miami	Dorian van Rijsselberghe	Netherlands	
Palma	Byron Kokkalanis	Greece	
Hyères	Byron Kokkalanis	Greece	
Medemblik	Przemysław Miarczyński	Poland	
Kiel	Julien Bontemps	France	
Weymouth	João Rodrigues	Portugal	

=== Women's RS:X ===
Regatta	Winner	Country	Ref
Melbourne	Jessica Crisp	Australia	
Miami	Marina Alabau	Spain	
Palma	Alessandra Sensini	Italy	
Hyères	Bryony Shaw	Great Britain	
Medemblik	Blanca Manchón	Spain	
Kiel	Agata Brygoła	Poland	
Weymouth	Charline Picon	France	

=== SKUD 18 ===
Regatta	Winners	Country	Ref
Melbourne	Amethyst Barnbrook; Lindsay Mason	Australia	
Miami	Scott Whitman; Julia Dorsett	United States	
Weymouth	Daniel Fitzgibbon; Rachael Cox	Australia	

=== Sonar ===
Regatta	Winners	Country	Ref
Miami	Aleksander Wang-Hansen; Per Eugen Kristiansen; Marie Solberg	Norway	
Hyères	Dror Cohen; Arnon Efrati; Benni Vexler	Israel	
Weymouth	Udo Hessels; Marcel van de Veen; Mischa Rossen	Netherlands	

=== Men's Star ===
Regatta	Winners	Country	Ref
Miami	Eivind Melleby; Petter Mørland Pedersen	Norway	
Palma	Fredrik Lööf; Johan Tillander	Sweden	
Hyères	Eivind Melleby; Petter Mørland Pedersen	Norway	
Medemblik	Eivind Melleby; Petter Mørland Pedersen	Norway	
Kiel	Robert Scheidt; Bruno Prada	Brazil	
Weymouth	Peter O'Leary; Frithjof Kleen	Ireland	
