= 2008–09 ISAF Sailing World Cup =

Event title
- Edition: 1st
- Dates: 16 December 2008 – 19 September 2009
- Yachts: 2.4 Metre, 470, 49er, Elliott 6m, Finn, Laser, Laser Radial, RS:X, SB20, SKUD 18, Sonar, Star, Yngling

The 2008–09 ISAF Sailing World Cup was a series of sailing regattas staged during 2008–09 season. The series featured boats which feature at the Olympics and Paralympics.

== Regattas ==
2017 regattas

Date	Regatta	City	Country
16–21 December 2008	Sail Melbourne	Melbourne	Australia
25–31 January 2009	Miami OCR	Miami	United States
4–10 April 2009	Trofeo Princesa Sofía	Palma	Spain
18–24 April 2009	Semaine Olympique Française	Hyères	France
27–31 May 2009	Delta Lloyd Regatta	Medemblik	Netherlands
20–28 June 2009	Kiel Week	Kiel	Germany
14–19 September 2009	Sail for Gold	Weymouth	United Kingdom

== Results ==
=== 2.4 Metre ===
Regatta	Winner	Country	Ref
Melbourne	Joshua Mckenzie-Brown	New Zealand	
Miami	Damien Seguin	France	
Palma	Thierry Schmitter	Netherlands	
Hyères	Damien Seguin	France	
Medemblik	Thierry Schmitter	Netherlands	
Kiel	Thierry Schmitter	Netherlands	
Weymouth	Thierry Schmitter	Netherlands	

=== Men's 470 ===
Regatta	Winners	Country	Ref
Melbourne	Mathew Belcher; Malcolm Page	Australia	
Miami	Onán Barreiros; Aarón Sarmiento	Spain	
Palma	Nicolas Charbonnier; Baptiste Meyer	France	
Hyères	Matías Bühler; Felix Steiger	Switzerland	
Medemblik	Pierre Leboucher; Vincent Garos	France	
Kiel	Šime Fantela; Igor Marenić	Croatia	
Weymouth	Nic Asher; Elliot Willis	Great Britain	

=== Women's 470 ===
Regatta	Winners	Country	Ref
Melbourne	Stacey Omay; Chelsea Hall	Australia	
Miami	Henriette Koch; Lene Sommer	Denmark	
Palma	Sylvia Vogl; Carolina Flatscher	Austria	
Hyères	Henriette Koch; Lene Sommer	Denmark	
Medemblik	Ai Kondo Yoshida; Wakako Kajimoto	Japan	
Kiel	Lisa Westerhof; Lobke Berkhout	Netherlands	
Weymouth	Lisa Westerhof; Lobke Berkhout	Netherlands	

=== 49er ===
Regatta	Winners	Country	Ref
Melbourne	Paul Campbell-James; Mark Asquith	Great Britain	
Miami	Nico Delle Karth; Nikolaus Resch	Austria	
Palma	Pietro Sibello; Gianfranco Sibello	Italy	
Hyères	Pietro Sibello; Gianfranco Sibello	Italy	
Medemblik	Nathan Outteridge; Iain Jensen	Australia	
Kiel	Lennart Briesenick; Morten Massmann	Germany	
Weymouth	Nathan Outteridge; Iain Jensen	Australia	

=== Women's Elliott 6m ===
Regatta	Winners	Country	Ref
Kiel	Katie Spithill; Nina Curtis; Nicole Douglass	Australia	
Weymouth	Renee Groeneveld; Annemieke Bes; Brechtje van der Werf	Netherlands	

=== Finn ===
Regatta	Winner	Country	Ref
Melbourne	Warwick Hill	Australia	
Miami	Edward Wright	Great Britain	
Palma	Giles Scott	Great Britain	
Hyères	Ivan Kljaković Gašpić	Croatia	
Medemblik	Edward Wright	Great Britain	
Kiel	Rafał Szukiel	Poland	
Weymouth	Ivan Kljakovic Gaspic	Croatia	

=== Men's Laser ===
Regatta	Winner	Country	Ref
Melbourne	Matías del Solar	Chile	
Miami	Nick Thompson	Great Britain	
Palma	Nick Thompson	Great Britain	
Hyères	Paul Goodison	Great Britain	
Medemblik	Paul Goodison	Great Britain	
Kiel	Paul Goodison	Great Britain	
Weymouth	Tom Slingsby	Australia	

=== Women's Laser Radial ===
Regatta	Winner	Country	Ref
Melbourne	Anna Tobias	United States	
Miami	Anna Tobias	United States	
Palma	Paige Railey	United States	
Hyères	Anna Tobias	United States	
Medemblik	Tatiana Drozdovskaya	Belarus	
Kiel	Paige Railey	United States	
Weymouth	Sari Multala	Finland	

=== Men's RS:X ===
Regatta	Winner	Country	Ref
Melbourne	Nicolas le Gal	France	
Miami	Dorian van Rijsselberghe	Netherlands	
Palma	Dorian van Rijsselberghe	Netherlands	
Hyères	Shahar Tzuberi	Israel	
Medemblik	Dorian van Rijsselberghe	Netherlands	
Kiel	Przemysław Miarczyński	Poland	
Weymouth	Ricardo Santos	Brazil	

=== Women's RS:X ===
Regatta	Winner	Country	Ref
Melbourne	Blanca Manchón	Spain	
Miami	Marina Alabau	Spain	
Palma	Blanca Manchon	Spain	
Hyères	Chen Peina	China	
Medemblik	Blanca Manchon	Spain	
Kiel	Moana Delle	Germany	
Weymouth	Blanca Manchon	Spain	

=== Women's SB20 ===
Regatta	Winners	Country	Ref
Miami	Lotte Meldgaard Pedersen; Tina Schmidt; Trine Palludan	Denmark	

=== SKUD 18 ===
Regatta	Winners	Country	Ref
Miami	Scott Whitman; Julia Dorsett	United States	
Weymouth	Scott Whitman; Julia Dorsett	United States	

=== Sonar ===
Regatta	Winners	Country	Ref
Miami	John Robertson; Hannah Stodel; Aleksander Wang-Hansen	Great Britain	
Weymouth	Alphonsus Doerr; Maureen Mckinnon; Hugh Freund	United States	

=== Men's Star ===
Regatta	Winners	Country	Ref
Miami	Rick Merriman; Phil Trinter	United States	
Palma	Robert Stanjek; Markus Koy	Germany	
Hyères	Xavier Rohart; Pierre-Alexis Ponsot	France	
Medemblik	Robert Scheidt; Bruno Prada	Brazil	
Kiel	Mark Mendelblatt; Mark Strube	United States	
Weymouth	Iain Percy; Andrew Simpson	Great Britain	

=== Women's Yngling ===
Regatta	Winners	Country	Ref
Medemblik	Lucy MacGregor; Annie Lush; Ally Martin	Great Britain	
