= Sail for Gold =

Annual sailing regatta in Weymouth

- First held: 2006
- Classes: 2.4mR, 470, 49er, 49er FX, Finn, Laser, Laser Radial, Nacra 17, RS:X, Sonar
- Venue: Weymouth
- Website: sailforgold.co.uk

Sail for Gold is an annual sailing regatta in Weymouth, the United Kingdom. The regatta was first held in 2006 and hosts the Olympic and Paralympic classes.

It is part of the 2014 EUROSAF Champions Sailing Cup.

== Winners ==
=== Finn ===
- 2006 – Ed Wright (GBR)
- 2007 – Ed Wright (GBR)
- 2008 – Giles Scott (GBR)
- 2009 – Ivan Kljaković Gašpić (CRO)
- 2010 – Giles Scott (GBR)
- 2011 – Ben Ainslie (GBR)
- 2012 – Giles Scott (GBR)
- 2013 – Mark Andrews (GBR)
- 2014 – Giles Scott (GBR)
- 2015 – Giles Scott (GBR)

=== Laser ===
- 2006 – Paul Goodison (GBR)
- 2007 – Nick Thompson (GBR)
- 2008 – Nick Thompson (GBR)
- 2009 – Tom Slingsby (AUS)
- 2010 – Tom Slingsby (AUS)
- 2011 – Tom Slingsby (AUS)
- 2012 – Tom Slingsby (AUS)
- 2013 – Sam Meech (NZL)
- 2015 – Philipp Buhl (GER)

=== Laser Radial ===
- 2006 – Charlotte Dobson (GBR)
- 2007 – Penny Clark (GBR)
- 2008 – Xu Lijia (CHN)
- 2009 – Sari Multala (FIN)
- 2010 – Marit Bouwmeester (NED)
- 2011 – Marit Bouwmeester (NED)
- 2012 – Alison Young (GBR)
- 2013 – Xu Lijia (CHN)
- 2015 – Marit Bouwmeester (NED)

=== Men's 470 ===
- 2006 – Nick Rogers & Joe Glanfield (GBR)
- 2007 – Nick Rogers & Joe Glanfield (GBR)
- 2008 – Nic Asher & Elliot Willis (GBR)
- 2009 – Nic Asher & Elliot Willis (GBR)
- 2010 – Pierre Leboucher & Vincent Garos (FRA)
- 2011 – Pierre Leboucher & Vincent Garos (FRA)
- 2012 – Mathew Belcher & Malcolm Page (AUS)
- 2014 – Luke Patience & Elliot Willis (GBR)
- 2015 – Stuart McNay & Dave Hughes (USA)

=== Women's 470 ===
- 2006 – Ally Martin & Lottie Clay (GBR)
- 2007 – Christina Bassadone & Saskia Clark (GBR)
- 2008 – Tara Pacheco & Berta Betanzos (ESP)
- 2009 – Lisa Westerhof & Lobke Berkhout (NED)
- 2010 – Ai Kondo & Wakako Tabata (JPN)
- 2011 – Jo Aleh & Polly Powrie (NZL)
- 2012 – Jo Aleh & Polly Powrie (NZL)
- 2014 – Sophie Weguelin & Eilidh McIntyre (GBR)
- 2015 – Hannah Mills & Saskia Clark (GBR)

=== 49er ===
- 2006 – Iker Martínez de Lizarduy & Xabier Fernández (ESP)
- 2007 – John Pink & Simon Wheeler (GBR)
- 2008 – Stevie Morrison & Ben Rhodes (GBR)
- 2009 – Nathan Outteridge & Iain Jensen (AUS)
- 2010 – Nathan Outteridge & Iain Jensen (AUS)
- 2011 – Nathan Outteridge & Iain Jensen (AUS)
- 2012 – Nathan Outteridge & Iain Jensen (AUS)
- 2013 – Ryan Seaton & Matt McGovern (IRL)
- 2014 – David Evans & Edward Powys (GBR)
- 2015 – Peter Burling & Blair Tuke (NZL)

=== 49er FX ===
- 2013 – Charlotte Dobson & Nicola Groves (GBR)
- 2014 – Annemiek Bekkering & Annette Duetz (NED)
- 2015 – Martine Grael & Kahena Kunze (BRA)

=== 2.4 Metre ===
- 2009 – Thierry Schmitter (NED)
- 2010 – Damien Seguin (FRA)
- 2011 – Damien Seguin (FRA)
- 2012 – Thierry Schmitter (NED)
- 2013 – Megan Pascoe (GBR)
- 2014 – Megan Pascoe (GBR)
- 2015 – Helena Lucas (GBR)

=== Elliott 6m ===
- 2009 – Renee Groeneveld, Annemieke Bes & Brechtje van der Werf (NED)
- 2010 – Nicky Souter, Nina Curtis & Olivia Price (AUS)
- 2011 – Anna Tunnicliffe, Deborah Capozzi & Molly Vandemoer (USA)
- 2012 – Olivia Price, Nina Curtis & Lucinda Whitty (AUS)

=== Skud 18 ===
- 2009 – Scott Whitman & Julia Dorsett (USA)
- 2010 – Daniel Fitzgibbon & Rachael Cox (AUS)
- 2011 – Daniel Fitzgibbon & Liesl Tesch (AUS)
- 2012 – Alexandra Rickham & Niki Birrell (GBR)
- 2015 – Alexandra Rickham & Niki Birrell (GBR)

=== Sonar ===
- 2009 – Rick Doerr, Hugh Freund & Maureen McKinnon-Tucker (USA)
- 2010 – Udo Hessels, Mischa Rossen & Marcel van de Veen (NED)
- 2011 – John Robertson, Hannah Stodel & Stephen Thomas (GBR)
- 2012 – John Robertson, Hannah Stodel & Stephen Thomas (GBR)
- 2013 – John Robertson, Hannah Stodel & Stephen Thomas (GBR)
- 2014 – John Robertson, Hannah Stodel & Stephen Thomas (GBR)
- 2015 – Colin Harrison, Russell Boaden & Jonathan Harris (GBR)

=== Star ===
- 2009 – Iain Percy & Andrew Simpson (GBR)
- 2010 – Peter O'Leary & Frithjof Kleen (IRL)
- 2011 – Robert Scheidt & Bruno Prada (BRA)
- 2012 – Peter O'Leary & David Burrows (IRL)

=== Yngling ===
- 2006 – Shirley Robertson, Annie Lush & Lucy MacGregor (GBR)

=== Nacra 17 ===
- 2013 – Ben Saxton & Hannah Diamond (GBR)
- 2014 – Lucy MacGregor & Andrew Walsh (GBR)
- 2015 – Jason Waterhouse & Lisa Darmanin (AUS)

=== Tornado ===
- 2006 – Leigh McMillan & Will Howden (GBR)
- 2007 – Leigh McMillan & Will Howden (GBR)

=== Men's Formula Kite ===
- 2015 – Florián Trittel (ESP)

=== Women's Formula Kite ===
- 2015 – Stephanie Bridge (GBR)

=== Men's RS:X ===
- 2006 – Nick Dempsey (GBR)
- 2007 – Nick Dempsey (GBR)
- 2008 – Shahar Tzuberi (ISR)
- 2009 – Ricardo Santos (BRA)
- 2010 – João Rodrigues (POR)
- 2011 – Nick Dempsey (GBR)
- 2012 – Dorian van Rijsselberghe (NED)
- 2013 – Nick Dempsey (GBR)
- 2014 – Nick Dempsey (GBR)
- 2015 – Nick Dempsey (GBR)

=== Women's RS:X ===
- 2006 – Bryony Shaw (GBR)
- 2007 – Bryony Shaw (GBR)
- 2008 – Blanca Manchón (ESP)
- 2009 – Blanca Manchón (ESP)
- 2010 – Charline Picon (FRA)
- 2011 – Marina Alabau (ESP)
- 2012 – Zofia Noceti-Klepacka (POL)
- 2013 – Bryony Shaw (GBR)
- 2014 – Bryony Shaw (GBR)
- 2015 – Flavia Tartaglini (ITA)
