= 2011 ISAF Sailing World Championships – Elliott 6m =

Elliot 6m at the 2011 ISAF Sailing World Championships
- Venue: Perth, Western Australia
- Dates: 3–16 December
- Competitors: 87 from 19 nations

Medalists
gold medal	Anna Tunnicliffe; Deborah Capozzi; Molly Vandemoer	United States
silver medal	Lucy MacGregor; Annie Lush; Kate MacGregor	Great Britain
bronze medal	Claire Leroy; Élodie Bertrand; Riou	France

The Elliott 6m class at the 2011 ISAF Sailing World Championships was held in Perth, Western Australia between 3 and 16 December 2011.

== Results ==
=== Knockout stage ===
Quarter-finals
7–8 August 2012
(Sweden) SWE-1 Kjellberg (8)	0
FRA-1 Leroy (1)	3
7–8 August 2012
GBR MacGregor (5)	3
NED-1 Mulder (4)	1
7–8 August 2012
AUS-2 Price(6)	0
RUS Skudina (3)	3
7–8 August 2012
AUS-1 Souter (7)	0
USA-1 Tunnicliffe (2)	3

Semi-finals
10 August 2012
FRA-1 Leroy (1)	2
GBR MacGregor (5)	3
10 August 2012
RUS Skudina (3)	1
USA-1 Tunnicliffe (2)	3

Final
11 August 2012
GBR MacGregor (5)	0
USA-1 Tunnicliffe (2)	4
Bronze Medal Match
11 August 2012
RUS Skudina (3)	1
FRA-1 Leroy (1)	3

=== Total results ===
Results of individual races
Pos	Crew	Country
Gold medal	Anna Tunnicliffe; Deborah Capozzi; Molly Vandemoer	United States
Silver medal	Lucy MacGregor; Annie Lush; Kate MacGregor	Great Britain
Bronze medal	Claire Leroy; Élodie Bertrand; Marie Riou	France
4	Ekaterina Skudina; Elena Siuzeva; Elena Oblova	Russia
5	Nicky Souter; Jessica Eastwell; Katie Spithell	Australia
6	Anna Kjellberg; Malin Källström; Lotta Harrysson	Sweden
7	Mandy Mulder; Merel Witteveen; Annemiek Bekkering	Netherlands
8	Olivia Price; Nina Curtis; Lucinda Whitty	Australia
9	Stephanie Hazard; Jenna Hansen; Susannah Pyatt	Australia
10	Renee Groeneveld; Marcelien Bos-de Koning; Annemieke Bes	Netherlands
11	Rita Goncalves; Diana Neves; Mariana Lobato	Portugal
12	Támara Echegoyen; Ángela Pumariega; Sofía Toro	Spain
13	Genevieve Tulloch; Alice Manard Leonard; Jenn Hamberlin	United States
14	Silja Lehtinen; Silja Kanerva; Annina Takala	Finland
15	Silvia Roca; Eva González; Lara Cacabelos	Spain
16	Lotte Meldgaard; Tina Schmidt Gramkov; Susanne Boidin	Denmark
17	Renata Demetrio Decnop Coelho; Larissa Bunese Juk; Gabriela Nicolino de Sa	Brazil
18	Silke Hahlbrock; Maren Hahlbrock; Anke Christiane Lukosch	Germany
19	Vesna Dekleva Paoli; Katarina Kersevan; Lena Koter	Slovenia
20	Juliana Siqueira Senfft; Fernanda Demetrio Decnop Coehlo; Luciana Kopschitz	Brazil
21	Wang Ru; LI Xiaoni; Pan Tingting	China
21	Trine Abrahmsen; Ida Hartvig Larsen; Trine Palludan	Denmark
23	Caroline Sylvan; Louise Kruuse af Verchou; Frida Langenius	Sweden
23	Anne Claire le Berre; Alice Ponsar; Myrtille Ponge	France
25	Sharon Ferris-Choat; Joanne Prokop; Caroline Kaars Sijpesteijn	Canada
25	Tania Zimmermann Villanueva-Meyer; Nathalie Zimmermann Vega; Josefina Roder Mori	Peru
27	Martina Maria Silva; Ana Lucia Silva; Maria Trinidad Silva	Argentina
27	Petra Kliba; Gea Barbic; Tajana Ganic	Croatia
29	Jinnie Gordon; Laurel Gordon Taylor; Jessica Simons	Canada
