= 2013–14 ISAF Sailing World Cup =

Event title
- Edition: 6th
- Dates: 12 October 2013 – 26 April 2014
- Yachts: 2.4 Metre, 470, 49er, 49er FX, Finn, Formula Kite, Laser, Laser Radial, Nacra 17, RS:X, SKUD 18, Sonar

The 2013–14 ISAF Sailing World Cup was a series of sailing regattas staged during 2013–14 season. The series featured boats which feature at the Olympics and Paralympics.

== Regattas ==
2013–14 regattas

Date	Regatta	City	Country
12–19 October 2013	ISAF Sailing World Cup Qingdao	Qingdao	China
1–8 December 2013	ISAF Sailing World Cup Melbourne	Melbourne	Australia
25 January – 1 February 2014	ISAF Sailing World Cup Miami	Miami	United States
29 March – 5 April 2014	ISAF Sailing World Cup Palma	Palma	Spain
19–26 April 2014	ISAF Sailing World Cup Hyères	Hyères	France

== Results ==
=== 2.4 Metre ===
Regatta	Winner	Country	Ref
Melbourne	Paul Francis	New Zealand	
Miami	Megan Pascoe	Great Britain	
Palma	Helena Lucas	Great Britain	
Hyères	Heiko Kröger	Germany	

=== Men's 470 ===
Regatta	Winners	Country	Ref
Qingdao	Lucas Calabrese; Juan de la Fuente	Argentina	
Melbourne	Mathew Belcher; Will Ryan	Australia	
Miami	Sofian Bouvet; Jérémie Mion	France	
Palma	Šime Fantela; Igor Marenić	Croatia	
Hyères	Mathew Belcher; Will Ryan	Australia	

=== Women's 470 ===
Regatta	Winners	Country	Ref
Qingdao	Jo Aleh; Polly Powrie	New Zealand	
Melbourne	Chen Shasha; Yang Gao	China	
Miami	Sophie Weguelin; Eilidh McIntyre	Great Britain	
Palma	Jo Aleh; Polly Powrie	New Zealand	
Hyères	Jo Aleh; Polly Powrie	New Zealand	

=== Men's 49er ===
Regatta	Winners	Country	Ref
Melbourne	Nathan Outteridge; Iain Jensen	Australia	
Miami	Jonas Warrer; Peter Lang	Denmark	
Palma	Peter Burling; Blair Tuke	New Zealand	
Hyères	Peter Burling; Blair Tuke	New Zealand	

=== Women's 49er FX ===
Regatta	Winners	Country	Ref
Melbourne	Olivia Price; Eliza Solly	Australia	
Miami	Sarah Steyaert; Julie Bossard	France	
Palma	Martine Grael; Kahena Kunze	Brazil	
Hyères	Martine Soffiatti Grael; Kahena Kunze	Brazil	

=== Men's Finn ===
Regatta	Winner	Country	Ref
Melbourne	Björn Allansson	Sweden	
Miami	Giles Scott	Great Britain	
Palma	Giles Scott	Great Britain	
Hyères	Pieter-Jan Postma	Netherlands	

=== Men's Formula Kite ===
Regatta	Winner	Country	Ref
Melbourne	Florian Gruber	Germany	

=== Women's Formula Kite ===
Regatta	Winner	Country	Ref
Melbourne	Nuria Goma	Spain	

=== Men's Laser ===
Regatta	Winner	Country	Ref
Qingdao	Tonči Stipanović	Croatia	
Melbourne	Tom Burton	Australia	
Miami	Tonči Stipanović	Croatia	
Palma	Tom Burton	Australia	
Hyères	Tom Burton	Australia	

=== Women's Laser Radial ===
Regatta	Winner	Country	Ref
Qingdao	Zhang Dongshuang	China	
Melbourne	Tatiana Drozdovskaya	Belarus	
Miami	Paige Railey	United States	
Palma	Marit Bouwmeester	Netherlands	
Hyères	Evi Van Acker	Belgium	

=== Mixed Nacra 17 ===
Regatta	Winners	Country	Ref
Melbourne	Darren Bundock; Nina Curtis	Australia	
Miami	Vittorio Bissaro; Silvia Sicouri	Italy	
Palma	Billy Besson; Marie Riou	France	
Hyères	Vittorio Bissaro; Silvia Sicouri	Italy	

=== Men's RS:X ===
Regatta	Winner	Country	Ref
Qingdao	Shahar Tzuberi	Israel	
Melbourne	Chuankun Shi	China	
Miami	Byron Kokkalanis	Greece	
Palma	Pierre Le Coq	France	
Hyères	Piotr Myszka	Poland	

=== Women's RS:X ===
Regatta	Winner	Country	Ref
Qingdao	Chen Peina	China	
Melbourne	Manjia Zheng	China	
Miami	Bryony Shaw	Great Britain	
Palma	Charline Picon	France	
Hyères	Moana Delle	Germany	

=== SKUD 18 ===
Regatta	Winners	Country	Ref
Melbourne	Jovin Tan; Desiree Lim	Singapore	
Miami	Alexandra Rickham; Niki Birrell	Great Britain	

=== Sonar ===
Regatta	Winners	Country	Ref
Miami	Bruno Jourdren; Eric Flageul; Nicolas Vimont-Vicary	France	
Hyères	John Robertson; Hannah Stodel; Steve Thomas	Great Britain	
