= Gary Boyd =

Gary Boyd may refer to:

- Gary Boyd (baseball) (1946–2025), American baseball player
- Gary Boyd (golfer) (born 1986), British golfer
- Gary Boyd (sailor) (born 1972), Australian sailor
