= Hélène Defrance =

French sailor (born 1986)

Personal information
- Nationality: French
- Born: 11 August 1986 (age 40) Clamart, France
- Occupations: Nutritionist, Dietitian
- Employer: Lille OSC
- Height: 179 cm (5 ft 10 in)
- Weight: 66 kg (146 lb)

Sport
- Sport: Sailing
- Event: 470
- Club: ASPTT Marseille

Achievements and titles
- Olympic finals: 2016
- World finals: 2015
- Regional finals: 2010, 2015
Medal record
Sailing
Representing France
470 European Championships
Gold medal – first place	2010 Istanbul	470
Silver medal – second place	2015 Aarhus	470
470 World Championships
Bronze medal – third place	2015 Haifa	470
Gold medal – first place	2016 San Isidro	470
Olympic Games
Bronze medal – third place	2016 Rio de Janeiro	470

Hélène Defrance (born 11 August 1986) is a French former sailor, who won a bronze medal in the women's 470 event at the 2016 Summer Olympics. She also won the 2010 470 European Championships race, and the 2016 470 World Championships. Defrance is a knight of the Ordre national du Mérite.

Being a qualified nutritionist, she now works for French professional football club Lille OSC, within the High Performance structure.

== Career ==
Defrance was a member of ASPTT Marseille. In 2010, Defrance and Emmanuelle Rol won the 470 European Championships, and the 2009–10 ISAF Sailing World Cup stage in Hyères, France. Defrance failed to qualify for the 2012 Summer Olympics in London.

In 2013, Defrance teamed up with Camille Lecointre, after Lecointre's Olympic partner Mathilde Géron returned to studying after the Games. The pair won the 2013 French National Championships, and came second at the 2013–14 ISAF Sailing World Cup events in Miami and Palma de Mallorca. Defrance and Lecointre were winning the Mallorca event until the last race, when they were overtaken by New Zealand's Jo Aleh and Polly Powrie. Defrance and Lecointre won a bronze medal at the 2015 470 World Championships, and a silver medal at that year's 470 European Championships. The pair won the 2016 470 World Championships event in Argentina. In March 2016, Defrance and Lecointre were selected for the women's 470 event at the 2016 Summer Olympics; it was Defrance's first Olympic Games. At the Games, they finished third, winning the bronze medal. They were one point ahead of the fourth-placed team, the Dutch pair of Afrodite Zegers and Anneloes van Veen. In the final race of the competition, they came from the back of the fleet up to sixth place, which secured their bronze medal.

After the Games, she took a break from sailing. In 2017, Defrance sailed GC32 boats; she tried to find a sponsor for the 2018 GC32 sailing season.

== Post career ==
After the 2016 Summer Olympics, Defrance trained to become a qualified dietician in Perpignan, France. She had previously been working on the job part-time alongside her sailing commitments since 2014. In 2018, she was one of 18 French former Olympic and Paralympic athletes chosen to support the Paris bid for the 2024 Summer Olympics. As of 2022, she worked as a nutritionist for Ligue 1 club Lille OSC.

== Honours ==
In November 2016, Defrance was awarded the title of Chevalier (Knight) in the French Ordre national du Mérite, for services to sailing.
