= Female Snipe World Championship =

Sailing World Championship in the Snipe for females

The Female Snipe World Championship is an bi-annual international sailing regatta held in the Snipe (dinghy). It is organized by the host club on behalf of the Snipe Class International Racing Association (SCIRA) and recognized by World Sailing, the sports IOC recognized governing body.

== Trophies ==
The Roy Yamaguchi Memorial Trophy is awarded to the winning helm and her it was donated to the class by Japanenese Class Association who hosted the first addition of the event. The other trophy of note is the Carmen Diaz Trophy donated by Augie Diaz and is awarded to the highest placing boat with a helm and crew aged under 22 in the year of the event.

== Events ==
| Ed. | | | Hosts | | | Boat | Sailor | | | Ref. |
| No | Day/Month | Year | Host club | City | Country | Boat | No. | Nat. | Cont. | Ref. |
|---|---|---|---|---|---|---|---|---|---|---|
| 1 | 11–15 Aug | 1992 | Hakkeijima Marina | Yokohama | Japan | 44 | 88 | 5 | 4 | |
| 2 | 8–11 Sep | 1996 | Club de Regatas Mar Menor | Cartagena | Spain | 23 | 46 | 9 | 4 | |
| 3 | 3–7 Oct | 1998 | Severn Sailing Association | Annapolis | United States | 31 | 62 | 10 | 4 | |
| 4 | 28 Aug – 3 Sep | 2000 | Societa Triestina della Vela | Trieste | Italy | 30 | 60 | 10 | 4 | |
| 5 | 15-20 Oct | 2002 | St. Petersburg Yacht Club | Tampa Bay | United States | 26 | 52 | 8 | 4 | |
| 6 | 14 Aug | 2004 | Vestfjordens Seilforening | Oslo | Norway | 35 | 70 | 8 | 4 | |
| 7 | 19–26 Nov | 2006 | Yacht Club Punta del Este | Punta del Este | Uruguay | 15 | 30 | 9 | 4 | |
| 8 | 24-28 Sep | 2008 | Real Club Náutico de Roquetas de Mar | Roquetas de Mar | Spain | 23 | 46 | 9 | 4 | |
| 9 | 7–12 Nov | 2010 | St. Petersburg Yacht Club | St. Petersburg | United States | 24 | 48 | 8 | 4 | |
| 10 | 18–23 Sep | 2012 | Real Club Mediterráneo | Málaga | Spain | 21 | 42 | 5 | 4 | |
| 11 | 3–8 Nov | 2014 | Club Náutico Córdoba | Córdoba | Argentina | 14 | 28 | 4 | 3 | |
| 12 | 26-29 Aug | 2016 | Circolo Velico Tiberino | Bracciano | Italy | 19 | 38 | 8 | 3 | |
| 13 | 14–19 Aug | 2018 | Sail Newport | Newport | United States | 32 | 64 | 10 | 3 | |
| N/A | 8–12 Oct | 2020 | Yacht Club Paulista | São Paulo | Brazil | CANCELLED DUE TO COVID | | | | |
| 15 | 6–9 Oct | 2021 | Yacht Club Paulista | São Paulo | Brazil | 40 | 80 | 7 | 3 | |
| 16 | 3–8 Oct | 2023 | Club de Vela Valencia Mar | Valencia | Spain | 42 | 84 | 14 | 4 | |
| 17 | 22–27 Jul | 2025 | Enoshima Yacht Harbour | Enoshima | Japan | 34 | 68 | 6 | 4 | |

== Winners ==
| Year | Skipper/Crew | Fleet | Country | Ref. |
|---|---|---|---|---|
| 1994 | Pauline Book; Carine Juliussen | Åsgårdstrand Seilforening | Norway | |
| 1996 | Pauline Book; Carine Juliussen | Åsgårdstrand Seilforening | Norway | |
| 1998 | Yekaterina Skudina; Tatiana Lartseva | Pirogovo Club | Russia | |
| 2000 | Karianne Eikeland; Janett Krefting | Bergens Seilforening | Norway | |
| 2002 | Carolyn Brown Krebs; Julie Redler | Mission Bay Yacht Club | United States | |
| 2004 | Andrea Foglia; Mariana Foglia | Yacht Club Punta del Este | Uruguay | |
| 2006 | Andrea Foglia; Mariana Foglia | Yacht Club Punta del Este | Uruguay | |
| 2008 | Marina Gallego Durán; Marina Sánchez Ferrer | Real Club de Regatas de Santiago de la Ribera | Spain | |
| 2010 | Anna Tunnicliffe; Molly O'Bryan Vandemoer | Lauderdale Yacht Club | United States | |
| 2012 | Marta Hernández de la Higuera; Ángela Hernández de la Higuera | Club de Mar de Almería | Spain | |
| 2014 | María Paula Salerno; Mariela Cecilia Salerno | Yacht Club Argentino | Argentina | |
| 2016 | Juliana Duque; Amanda Sento Sé | Yacht Clube da Bahía | Brazil | |
| 2018 | Carol Cronin; Kim Couranz | Severn Sailing Association | United States | |
| 2021 | Juliana Duque; Mila Beckerath | Yacht Clube da Bahía | Brazil | |
| 2023 | Juliana Duque; Bruna Di Croce Patricio | Yacht Clube da Bahía | Brazil | |
| 2025 | Ai Yoshida; Honoka Miura | Odakyu Yacht Club | Japan | |

== See also ==
- Open Snipe World Championship
- Youth Snipe World Championship
- Masters Snipe World Championship
