= 2011 ISAF Sailing World Championships =

Sailing event in Perth, Western Australia

Event title
- Edition: 3rd

Event details
- Venue: Perth, Western Australia
- Dates: 3–18 December 2011
- Titles: 10
- Opening ceremony: 2 December 2011

Competitors
- Competitors: 789
- Competing nations: 76
- Qualification(s): 2012 Summer Olympics

The 2011 ISAF Sailing World Championships was held in Perth, Western Australia, this was the third edition of the ISAF Sailing World Championships. It is the world championships for all disciplines used at the upcoming Olympics. As it used to allocate 75% of the qualification quota for the 2012 Summer Olympics this event has added significance.

== Venues ==
A number of different venues and courses was used for the different events:

- The Harbour Course. Women's match racing events – billed as "largest match racing competition ever held" – will be held in the Inner Harbour.
- The Centre Course, closest to the shore. Will host most medal races.
- The Leighton Course, located off of Leighton Beach in North Fremantle.
- The Parmelia Course, located west of the Centre Course, closest to Rottnest Island.
- The Owen Course. The most southerly course, closest to Woodman Point.
- The Success Course. Both the men's and women's Laser events will be held at the Fremantle Sailing Club in near Success Harbour, south of the main venues.

== Festival ==
In conjunction with the sailing championships, a festival, the 2011 WORLDS FESTIVAL, will be held in Fremantle, featuring "an exciting and diverse programme of cultural activities that will showcase [the] Australian lifestyle, the sport of sailing and the arts".

== Controversy ==
The City of Fremantle objected to the branding of the championships as a "Perth event", in particular, the erection of a large "Perth" sign on Bathers' Beach outside Challenger Harbour. Fremantle had previously hosted the 1987 America's Cup.

== Opening ceremony ==
The opening ceremony of the championship was held on 2 December 2011 at the Barrack Street Jetty. The ceremony consisted of parade of athletes through the streets of Perth, speeches by dignitaries, oaths from competitors and officials, and the raising of the International Sailing Federation flag, followed by a parade of sail down the Swan River from Perth to Fremantle, featuring a "convoy of boats representing the history and heritage of each of the yacht clubs along the river".

== Events and equipment ==
The following events were open for entries:

Event	Equipment	Max. entries
Men's one-person dinghy	Laser	150
Men's one-person dinghy (heavyweight)	Finn	80
Men's two-person dinghy	470	120
Men's skiff	49er	100
Men's keelboat	Star	80
Men's windsurfer	RS:X	120
Women's one-person dinghy	Laser Radial	120
Women's two-person dinghy	470	80
Women's windsurfer	RS:X	80
Women's match racing	Elliott 6m	32

== Summary ==
=== Medal table ===
* Host nation (Australia)

Rank	Nation	Gold	Silver	Bronze	Total
1	Australia (AUS)*	3	0	0	3
2	Netherlands (NED)	2	1	0	3
3	Great Britain (GBR)	1	4	1	6
4	United States (USA)	1	0	2	3
5	Israel (ISR)	1	0	1	2
5	Spain (ESP)	1	0	1	2
7	Brazil (BRA)	1	0	0	1
8	Poland (POL)	0	2	0	2
9	New Zealand (NZL)	0	1	2	3
10	Belgium (BEL)	0	1	0	1
10	Germany (GER)	0	1	0	1
12	Croatia (CRO)	0	0	1	1
12	Denmark (DEN)	0	0	1	1
12	France (FRA)	0	0	1	1
Totals (14 entries)		10	10	10	30

=== Event medalists ===
Event	Gold	Silver	Bronze
Men's 470	Australia; Mathew Belcher; Malcolm Page	Great Britain; Luke Patience; Stuart Bithell	Croatia; Šime Fantela; Igor Marenić
Women's 470	Spain; Tara Pacheco; Berta Betanzos	Great Britain; Hannah Mills; Saskia Clark	New Zealand; Jo Aleh; Polly Powrie
49er	Australia; Nathan Outteridge; Iain Jensen	New Zealand; Peter Burling; Blair Tuke	Denmark; Emil Toft Nielsen; Simon Toft Nielsen
Elliott 6m	United States; Anna Tunnicliffe; Deborah Capozzi; Molly Vandemoer	Great Britain; Lucy MacGregor; Annie Lush; Kate MacGregor	France; Claire Leroy; Élodie Bertrand; Marie Riou
Laser	Tom Slingsby (AUS)	Nick Thompson (GBR)	Andrew Murdoch (NZL)
Laser Radial	Marit Bouwmeester (NED)	Evi Van Acker (BEL)	Paige Railey (USA)
Finn	Giles Scott (GBR)	Pieter-Jan Postma (NED)	Edward Wright (GBR)
Men's RS:X	Dorian van Rijsselberghe (NED)	Piotr Myszka (POL)	Nimrod Mashiach (ISR)
Women's RS:X	Lee Korzits (ISR)	Zofia Noceti-Klepacka (POL)	Marina Alabau (ESP)
Star	Brazil; Robert Scheidt; Bruno Prada	Germany; Robert Stanjek; Frithjof Kleen	United States; Mark Mendelblatt; Brian Fatih
