= Andrea Foglia =

Uruguayan sports sailor

Andrea Foglia Costa (Note: In this Spanish name, the first or paternal surname is Foglia and the second or maternal family name is Costa.) (born December 4, 1985) is a Uruguayan sports sailor. At the 2012 Summer Olympics, she competed in the Women's Laser Radial class, finishing in 38th place.

She won the Women's World Championship in the Snipe class twice (2004 and 2006).

Her brother is Alejandro Foglia, another Uruguayan sailor.

== Results ==
=== Women's Snipe class ===
- World Championships
  - 2004: 1st
  - 2006: 1st

=== Women's Laser Radial class ===
- Pan American Games
  - 2011: 9th
- ISAF Sailing World Championships
  - 2011: 69th
- Olympic Games
  - 2012: 38th
