= Sailing World Cup =

Sporting competition

- First held: 2008
- Last held: 2024
- Organizer: World Sailing
- Classes: 470, 49er, 49er FX, Finn, Laser, Laser Radial, Nacra 17, RS:X
- Website: www.sailinggrandslam.com

The Sailing Grand Slam, formerly World Sailing's Sailing World Cup, is a series of sailing regattas. The World Cup came into existence during the 2008–09 Season. The series includes boats that have competed in the Olympics and Paralympics.

The world cup was from the beginning composed of the major regattas Sail Melbourne in Melbourne, US Sailings's Rolex Miami OCR in Miami, Trofeo SAR Princess Sofia in Palma de Majorca, Semaine Olympique Française in Hyères and Delta Lloyd Regatta in Medemblik.

For 2023 and 2024, the Sailing World Cup consisted of Trofeo Princesa Sofía, Allianz Regatta, Semaine Olympique Française, and Kiel Week. For 2025, the four European regattas Trofeo Princesa Sofía, Semaine Olympique Française, Dutch Water Week, and Kiel Week, and Long Beach Olympic Classes Regatta in the venue of the 2028 Olympic sailing competition, instead grouped as the Sailing Grand Slam.

== Seasons ==
Season	Regattas	Ref.
2008–09	Melbourne, Miami, Palma, Hyères, Medemblik, Weymouth	
2009–10	Melbourne, Miami, Palma, Hyères, Medemblik, Weymouth	
2010–11	Melbourne, Miami, Palma, Hyères, Medemblik, Weymouth	
2011–12	Melbourne, Miami, Palma, Hyères, Medemblik, Weymouth	
2012–13	Melbourne, Miami, Palma, Hyères	
2013–14	Qingdao, Melbourne, Miami, Palma, Hyères	
2014	Qingdao, Abu Dhabi (final)	
2015	Melbourne, Miami, Hyères, Weymouth, Qingdao, Abu Dhabi (final)	
2016	Melbourne, Miami, Hyères, Weymouth, Qingdao, Melbourne (final)	
2017	Miami, Hyères, Santander (final)	
2018	Gamagōri, Miami, Hyères, Marseille (final)	
2019	Enoshima, Miami, Genoa, Marseille (final)	
2020	Enoshima, Miami, Genoa (cancelled), Enoshima (final; cancelled)	
2021	Medemblik	
2022	Palma, Medemblik	
2023	Palma, Hyères, Almere, Kiel	
2024	Palma, Hyères, Almere, Kiel	
