= Mariana Foglia =

Uruguayan sailor

Mariana Foglia (born June 28, 1982) is a Uruguayan sailor. She and Pablo Defazio placed 17th in the Nacra 17 event at the 2016 Summer Olympics.
