= Sail Melbourne =

Sailing event in Victoria, Australia

- Organizer: Yachting Victoria
- Website: www.sailmelbourne.com.au

Sail Melbourne is an annual sailing Regatta run by Yachting Victoria at various yacht clubs around Port Phillip Bay. Sail Melbourne is a Grade 1 ISAF (International Sailing Federation) event.

== Asia Pacific Regatta ==
The annual Asia Pacific Regatta as a part of Sail Melbourne consists of invited Olympic classes.

=== Laser Full Rig ===
The Laser Full Rig is a single handed mono hull with a single sail. Due to the simple design of the Laser, the racing is more focused of the ability of the crew instead of the boat.

=== Laser Radial ===
The Laser Radial is the Laser sailed by women in the Olympics. It has a smaller sail area and shorter mast than the full rig.

=== Tornado ===
The Tornado is a two-person, double trapeze Catamaran with an asymmetrical spinnaker.

=== 49er ===
The 49er is a two-person, double trapeze mono hull with an asymmetrical spinnaker.

=== Finn ===
The Finn is a single handed men's class.

=== 470 Men's and Women's ===
The 470 is a class broken up into Men's and Women's. It is a two-person, 4.7m mono hull with single trapeze and symmetrical spinnaker.

== Winners ==
=== Europe ===
- 1995 – Sharon Ferris (CAN)
- 1996 – Christine Bridge (AUS)
- 1997 – Sharon Ferris (CAN)
- 1998 – Carolijn Brouwer (NED)
- 2001 – Sarah Macky (NZL)
- 2002 – Min Dezillie (BEL)
- 2003 – Lenka Šmídová (CZE)
- 2004 – Sarah Blanck (AUS)

=== Finn ===
- 1996 – Paul McKenzie (AUS)
- 1998 – Sébastien Godefroid (BEL)
- 2000 – Mateusz Kusznierewicz (POL)
- 2002 – Sébastien Godefroid (BEL)
- 2003 – Sébastien Godefroid (BEL)
- 2004 – Anthony Nossiter (AUS)
- 2005 – Josh Beaver (AUS)
- 2007 – Michael Williams (AUS)
- 2008:1 – Ben Ainslie (GBR)
- 2008:2 – Warwick Hill (AUS)
- 2009 – James Paterson (AUS)
- 2010 – Ben Ainslie (GBR)
- 2011 – Oleksiy Borysov (UKR)
- 2012 – Brendan Casey (AUS)
- 2013 – Björn Allansson (SWE)
- 2014 – Ed Wright (GBR)
- 2016 – Jake Lilley (AUS)
- 2017 – Jake Lilley (AUS)
- 2018 – Nicholas Heiner (NED)
- 2020 – Jake Lilley (AUS)

=== ILCA 4 (formerly known as Laser 4.7) ===
- 2004 – Mark Lincoln (AUS)
- 2005 – Mark Lincoln (AUS)
- 2016 – Jack Littlechild (AUS)
- 2017 – Boston Cortis (AUS)
- 2018 – Brooke Wilson (AUS)
- 2020 – Mia Lovelady (AUS)
- 2022 – Angus McIntyre (AUS)
- 2023 – Riley Cantwell (AUS)

=== Women’s ILCA 6 (formerly known as Laser Radial) ===
- 2008:2 – Anna Tunnicliffe (USA)
- 2009 – Marit Bouwmeester (NED)
- 2010 – Zhang Dongshuang (CHN)
- 2011 – Xu Lijia (CHN)
- 2012 – Krystal Weir (AUS)
- 2013 – Tatiana Drozdovskaya (BLR)
- 2014 – Alison Young (GBR)
- 2016 – Marit Bouwmeester (NED)

=== Open ILCA 6 (formerly known as Laser Radial) ===
- 2002 – Jake Bartrom (NZL)
- 2003 – Jake Bartrom (NZL)
- 2004 – Matthew Chew (AUS)
- 2005 – Krystal Weir (AUS)
- 2006 – Krystal Weir (AUS)
- 2008:1 – Sarah Blanck (AUS)
- 2016 – Finnian Alexander (AUS)
- 2017 – Zac Littlewood (AUS)
- 2018 – Frazer Brew (AUS)
- 2020 – Stefan Elliott-Shircore (AUS)
- 2022 – Zoe Thomson (AUS)
- 2023 – Mária Érdi (HUN)

=== ILCA 7 (formerly known as Laser) ===
- 1995 – Hamish Pepper (NZL)
- 1996 – Daniel Birgmark (SWE)
- 1997 – Nik Burfoot (NZL)
- 1998 – Ben Ainslie (GBR)
- 2000 – Michael Blackburn (AUS)
- 2001 – Michael Blackburn (AUS)
- 2002 – Brendan Casey (AUS)
- 2003 – Michael Blackburn (AUS)
- 2004 – Paul Goodison (GBR)
- 2005 – Roope Suomalainen (FIN)
- 2006 – Tom Slingsby (AUS)
- 2007 – Kristian Ruth (NOR)
- 2008:1 – Paul Goodison (GBR)
- 2008:2 – Matías del Solar (CHI)
- 2009 – Mike Leigh (CAN)
- 2010 – Nick Thompson (GBR)
- 2011 – Tom Slingsby (AUS)
- 2012 – Tom Burton (AUS)
- 2013 – Tom Burton (AUS)
- 2014 – Tom Burton (AUS)
- 2016 – Pavlos Kontides (CYP)
- 2017 – Tom Burton (AUS)
- 2018 – Matthew Wearn (AUS)
- 2020 – Jean-Baptiste Bernaz (FRA)
- 2022 – Matthew Wearn (AUS)
- 2023 – Michael Beckett (GBR)

=== Minnow ===
- 2016 – Edward Warner (AUS)

=== OK ===
- 2018 – Roger Blasse (AUS)

=== Open Bic ===
- 2016 – Conall Green (AUS)
- 2017 – Travis Wadley (AUS)

=== Optimist ===
- 2003 – Leon Poutsma (AUS)
- 2016 – Ryan Littlechild (AUS)
- 2017 – Fletcher Walters (AUS)
- 2018 – Daniel Links (AUS)

=== RS 100 ===
- 2022 – Peter Milne (AUS)
- 2023 – Mike Boswell (AUS)

=== Sabre ===
- 2016 – James McLennan (AUS)

=== Waszp ===
- 2018 – Jack Felsenthal (AUS)
- 2022 – Jack Felsenthal (AUS)

=== 420 ===
- 2002 – Cheung Ka Ho & Ashun Tong Ping Shun (HKG)
- 2003 – Mithu Nahak & Thimiti Srikanth Chatu (IND)
- 2004 – Claire Cunningham & Felix Patterson (AUS)
- 2016 – Nick Joel & Hugo Llewelyn (AUS)
- 2017 – Marcello Torre & Owen Ready (AUS)
- 2018 – Cole Tapper & Tyler Creevey (AUS)
- 2022 – Hanako Tomishima & Grace Morrow (AUS)

=== Men’s 470 ===
- 1995 – Nigel Abbott (AUS)
- 1996 – Tom King (AUS)
- 1997 – Simon Cooke (NZL)
- 1998 – Lee Knapton (AUS)
- 2000 – Paul Foerster (USA)
- 2002 – Nathan Wilmot & Malcolm Page (AUS)
- 2003 – Nathan Wilmot & Malcolm Page (AUS)
- 2004 – Nathan Wilmot & Malcolm Page (AUS)
- 2005 – Mathew Belcher & Nick Behrens (AUS)
- 2006 – Nathan Wilmot (AUS)
- 2008:1 – Nick Rogers & Joe Glanfield (GBR)
- 2008:2 – Mathew Belcher & Malcolm Page (AUS)
- 2009 – Mathew Belcher & Malcolm Page (AUS)
- 2010 – Mathew Belcher & Malcolm Page (AUS)
- 2011 – Stuart McNay & Graham Biehl (USA)
- 2012 – Mathew Belcher & Will Ryan (AUS)
- 2013 – Mathew Belcher & Will Ryan (AUS)
- 2014 – Alexander Conway & Patrick Conway (AUS)
- 2016 – Mathew Belcher & Will Ryan (AUS)
- 2017 – Mathew Belcher & Will Ryan (AUS)
- 2018 – Mathew Belcher & Will Ryan (AUS)

=== Women’s 470 ===
- 1995 – Jeni Lidgett-Danks (AUS)
- 1996 – Jeni Lidgett-Danks (AUS)
- 1998 – Ruslana Taran (UKR)
- 2000 – Vlada Kravchun (UKR)
- 2002 – Jenny Armstrong & Belinda Stowell (AUS)
- 2003 – Jenny Armstrong & Belinda Stowell (AUS)
- 2004 – Ingrid Petitjean & Nadège Douroux (FRA)
- 2005 – Elise Rechichi & Tessa Parkinson (AUS)
- 2008:1 – Erin Maxwell & Isabelle Farrar (USA)
- 2008:2 – Stacey Omay & Chelsea Hall (AUS)
- 2009 – Jo Aleh & Polly Powrie (NZL)
- 2010 – Kathrin Kadelbach & Friederike Belcher (GER)
- 2011 – Elise Rechichi & Belinda Stowell (AUS)
- 2012 – Sasha Ryan & Jaime Ryan (AUS)
- 2013 – Chen Shasha & Gao Yang (CHN)
- 2014 – Sasha Ryan & Amelia Catt (AUS)
- 2016 – Lara Vadlau & Jolanta Ogar (AUT)
- 2017 – Carrie Smith & Jaime Ryan (AUS)
- 2018 – Frederike Loewe & Anna Markfort (GER)

=== Open 470 ===
- 2020 – Tyler Paige & Adrian Hoesch (ASA)
- 2022 – Chris Charlwood & Amelia Catt (AUS)
- 2023 – Nia Jerwood & Conor Nicholas (AUS)

=== 505 ===
- 2020 – Mike Holt & Rob Woelfel (USA)

=== 29er ===
- 2002 – Renee Linton & Aaron Linton (AUS)
- 2003 – James Tudball & Matt Williams (AUS)
- 2004 – Beau Outteridge & Micheal Taylor (AUS)
- 2016 – Max Paul & Tom Crockett (AUS)
- 2018 – Archie Cropley & Max Paul (AUS)
- 2022 – Daniel Links & Markus Sampson (AUS)

=== 49er ===
- 1998 – Marc Audineau (FRA)
- 2000 – Dan Slater (NZL)
- 2001 – Nigel Abbott (AUS)
- 2002 – Pietro Sibello & Gianfranco Sibello (ITA)
- 2003 – Chris Nicholson & Gary Boyd (AUS)
- 2004 – Chris Nicholson & Gary Boyd (AUS)
- 2005 – Scott Kenedy & Mark Kennedy (NZL)
- 2006 – Nathan Outteridge (AUS)
- 2008:2 – Paul Campbell-James & Mark Asquith (GBR)
- 2009 – Nathan Outteridge & Iain Jensen (AUS)
- 2010 – Nico Delle Karth & Nikolaus Resch (AUT)
- 2011 – Nathan Outteridge & Iain Jensen (AUS)
- 2012 – Steven Thomas & Rhys Mara (AUS)
- 2013 – Nathan Outteridge & Iain Jensen (AUS)
- 2014 – Nathan Outteridge & Iain Jensen (AUS)
- 2016 – Benjamin Bildstein & David Hussl (AUT)
- 2017 – David Gilmour & Joel Turner (AUS)
- 2018 – David Gilmour & Lachlan Gilmour (AUS)
- 2022 – Thomas Needham & Joel Turner (AUS)
- 2023 – Tom Burton & Max Paul (AUS)

=== 49er FX ===
- 2012 – Alex Maloney & Molly Meech (NZL)
- 2013 – Olivia Price & Eliza Solly (AUS)
- 2014 – Ragna Agerup & Maia Agerup (NOR)
- 2016 – Tess Lloyd & Eliza Solly (AUS)
- 2017 – Amelia Stabback & Ella Clark (AUS)
- 2018 – Tess Lloyd & Jaime Ryan (AUS)
- 2022 – Laura Harding & Annie Wilmot (AUS)
- 2023 – Olivia Price & Evie Haseldine (AUS)

=== Tasar ===
- 2020 – Gary Ratcliffe & Robyn Ratcliffe (AUS)
- 2022 – Chris Dance & Peter Hackett (AUS)
- 2023 – Bronwyn Ridgway & Paul Ridgway (AUS)

=== 2.4 Metre ===
- 2003 – Stuart Shimeld (AUS)
- 2004 – Stuart Shimeld (AUS)
- 2005 – Michael Leydon (AUS)
- 2008:2 – Joshua McKenzie-Brown (NZL)
- 2009 – Paul Tingley (CAN)
- 2010 – Matthew Bugg (AUS)
- 2011 – Matthew Bugg (AUS)
- 2013 – Paul Francis (NZL)
- 2014 – Matthew Bugg (AUS)
- 2017 – Neil Patterson (AUS)
- 2018 – Michael Leydon (AUS)
- 2020 – Michael Leydon (AUS)
- 2022 – John Collingwood (AUS)
- 2023 – Neil Patterson (AUS)

=== Hansa 303 (single) ===
- 2018 – Christopher Symonds (AUS)
- 2022 – Chris Symonds (AUS)

=== Hansa 303 (double) ===
- 2018 – Colin Alderton & Bradley Alderton (AUS)

=== Hansa Liberty ===
- 2020 – Bob Schahinger (AUS)
- 2022 – Bob Schahinger (AUS)
- 2023 – Alison Weatherly (AUS)

=== Skud 18 ===
- 2009 – Amethyst Barnbrook & Lindsay Mason (AUS)
- 2010 – Alexandra Rickham & Niki Birrell (GBR)
- 2011 – Alexandra Rickham & Niki Birrell (GBR)
- 2013 – Jovin Tan & Desiree Lim (SGP)
- 2014 – Daniel Fitzgibbon & Liesl Tesch (AUS)
- 2018 – Ross Manning & Maximillion Quan (AUS)

=== Soling ===
- 1995 – Cameron Miles (AUS)
- 1998 – Colin Beashel (AUS)

=== Star ===
- 1995 – Ian Johnson (AUS)
- 2002 – Ian Walker & Nick Williams (AUS)
- 2003 – Colin Beashel & David Giles (AUS)

=== Yngling ===
- 2002 – Melanie Dennison, Caroline Aders & Fiona Herbert (AUS)
- 2003 – Melanie Dennison, Caroline Aders & Fiona Herbert (AUS)
- 2005 – Nicky Bethwaite, Karyn Gojnich & Helen Impey (AUS)

=== Nacra 15 ===
- 2018 – Will Cooley & Bec Hancock (AUS)

=== Nacra 17 ===
- 2013 – Darren Bundock & Nina Curtis (AUS)
- 2014 – Jason Waterhouse & Lisa Darmanin (AUS)
- 2016 – Jason Waterhouse & Lisa Darmanin (AUS)
- 2017 – Jason Waterhouse & Lisa Darmanin (AUS)
- 2018 – Tayla Rietman & Lachlan White (AUS)

=== Tornado ===
- 1995 – Darren Bundock (AUS)
- 1997 – Darren Bundock (AUS)
- 1998 – Pierre Pennec (FRA)
- 2002 – Darren Bundock & John Forbes (AUS)
- 2003 – Darren Bundock & John Forbes (AUS)
- 2004 – Robbie Lovig & Glen Douglas (AUS)
- 2005 – Darren Bundock & Aaron Worrall (AUS)
- 2008:1 – Darren Bundock & Glenn Ashby (AUS)

=== Viper ===
- 2016 – Tayla Rietman & Lachlan White (AUS)

=== Men’s Formula Kite ===
- 2013 – Florian Gruber (GER)
- 2014 – Riccardo Andrea Leccese (ITA)

=== Women’s Formula Kite ===
- 2013 – Nuria Goma (ESP)
- 2014 – Ariane Imbert (FRA)

=== Open Formula Kite ===
- 2016 – Oliver Bridge (GBR)
- 2020 – Scott Whitehead (AUS)
- 2022 – Zac Pullen (AUS)
- 2023 – Oscar Timm (AUS)

=== Men’s Iqfoil ===
- 2023 – Grae Morris (AUS)

=== Women’s Iqfoil ===
- 2023 – Samantha Costin (AUS)

=== Men’s Mistral ===
- 1995 – Aaron McIntosh (NZL)
- 1996 – Tony Philp (FIJ)
- 1997 – JP Tobin (NZL)
- 1998 – Fredrik Palm (SWE)
- 2000 – Fredrik Palm (SWE)
- 2001 – Matthew McCormick (NZL)
- 2002 – JP Tobin (NZL)
- 2003 – JP Tobin (NZL)
- 2004 – Julien Bontemps (FRA)
- 2005 – Kwok Fai Cheng (HKG)

=== Women’s Mistral ===
- 1995 – Natasha Sturges (GBR)
- 1996 – Renee Herbert (FRA)
- 1997 – Lee Lai-shan (HKG)
- 1998 – Natasha Sturges (GBR)
- 2000 – Barbara Kendall (NZL)
- 2001 – Natasha Sturges (GBR)
- 2002 – Natasha Sturges (GBR)
- 2003 – Barbara Kendall (NZL)
- 2004 – Faustine Merret (FRA)
- 2005 – Chan Wai-man (HKG)

=== Men’s RS:X ===
- 2006 – Casper Bouman (NED)
- 2007 – Makoto Tomizawa (JPN)
- 2008:2 – Nicolas Le Gal (FRA)
- 2009 – Nicolas Lozano (COL)
- 2010 – Chan King Yin (HKG)
- 2011 – JP Tobin (NZL)
- 2012 – Luke Baillie (AUS)
- 2013 – Shi Chuankun (CHN)
- 2014 – Juozas Bernotas (LTU)
- 2016 – Kiran Badloe (NED)
- 2020 – Tom Squires (GBR)

=== Women’s RS:X ===
- 2006 – Chen Qiubin (CHN)
- 2007 – Alessandra Sensini (ITA)
- 2008:2 – Blanca Manchón (ESP)
- 2009 – Jessica Crisp (AUS)
- 2010 – Zhu Huali (CHN)
- 2011 – Jessica Crisp (AUS)
- 2013 – Zheng Manjia (CHN)
- 2014 – Stefaniya Elfutina (RUS)
- 2016 – Zofia Noceti-Klepacka (POL)
- 2020 – Noy Drihan (ISR)

=== Open RS:X ===
- 2017 – Joanna Sterling (AUS)

=== Techno 293 ===
- 2017 – William Grimshaw (AUS)
- 2018 – Jarrod Jones (AUS)
- 2022 – Harriet Wormald (AUS)

=== Techno 293+ ===
- 2018 – Hamish Swain (AUS)
- 2022 – Amelia Wilson (AUS)

=== Wind Foil ===
- 2022 – Grae Morris (AUS)

=== Windfoiling Open ===
- 2023 – Rylie Sinclair (AUS)

=== Wing Foiling ===
- 2022 – Jack Abbott (AUS)
