= Fredrik Palm =

Swedish windsurfer

Fredrik Palm (born 19 December 1974) is a Swedish Olympic windsurfer. He finished 19th in the Mistral event at the 1996 Summer Olympics and 23rd in the Mistral event at the 2000 Summer Olympics.
