= Yelena Oblova =

Russian sailor

Personal information
- Full name: Elena Aleksandrovna Vorobeva
- Nationality: Russia; Croatia
- Born: Elena Aleksandrovna Oblova; 18 April 1988 (age 38) Kolomna, Russian SFSR, Soviet Union
- Height: 178 cm (5 ft 10 in)
- Weight: 71 kg (157 lb)

Sailing career
- Sport: Sailing
- Club: Y.C. Split
- Class(es): Elliott 6m, Laser Radial, ILCA6

Elena Aleksandrovna Vorobeva née Oblova (Russian: Елена Александровна Воробьёва (Облова), born 18 April 1988 in Kolomna) is a Croatian sailor.

== Career ==
She competed for Russia at the 2012 Summer Olympics in London/Weymouth sailing the Elliott 6m Class with her teammates Yekaterina Skudina and Yelena Syuzeva.

She competed for Croatia at the 2020 Summer Olympics in Tokyo sailing the Laser Radial. Finished 12th out of 44 participants. She also competed for Croatia at the Paris 2024 Olympics in Marseille and finished 6th out of 43 competitors.
