= Kate MacGregor =

English sailor (born 1991)

Kate MacGregor (born 12 January 1991) is an English sailor. She was born in Poole, Dorset.

As of 2012, MacGregor is 1.58 metres (5 ft 2 in) tall and weighs 60 kilograms (130 lb). She is a member of Poole Yacht Club and is coached by Maurice Paardenkooper. She studied for a Business degree at Southampton Solent University but put her studies on hold to focus on her sailing career. She won a gold medal at the 2007 Australian Youth Olympic Festival held in Sydney, Australia.

In 2010, MacGregor teamed up with her older sister Lucy MacGregor, Annie Lush and Mary Rook to win gold at the ISAF women's match racing World Championship in Newport, Rhode Island, United States. The British crew won the final 3–2 over an American team helmed by two-time world title-winner Sally Barkow. At the 2011 Sailing World Championships in Perth, Australia, MacGregor reached the final of the match-racing event, as part of a crew with Lush and Lucy MacGregor, where they were beaten 4–0 by the United States boat skippered by Anna Tunnicliffe.

The three won a gold medal at the 2011 World Cup event in Hyères, France by beating Barkow's crew 3–0 in the final.

MacGregor was selected to compete for Great Britain at the 2012 Summer Olympics in the newly created Elliott 6 metres match-racing event. She will compete alongside her sister Lucy MacGregor and Annie Lush. Together the three are nicknamed the "Match Race Girls". The event took place at the Weymouth and Portland National Sailing Academy with the round robin group stage being held from 29 July to 4 August 2012. They were defeated in the quarter finals of the Sailing at the 2012 Summer Olympics – Elliott 6m by the Russian team.
