= Berta Betanzos =

Spanish sailor

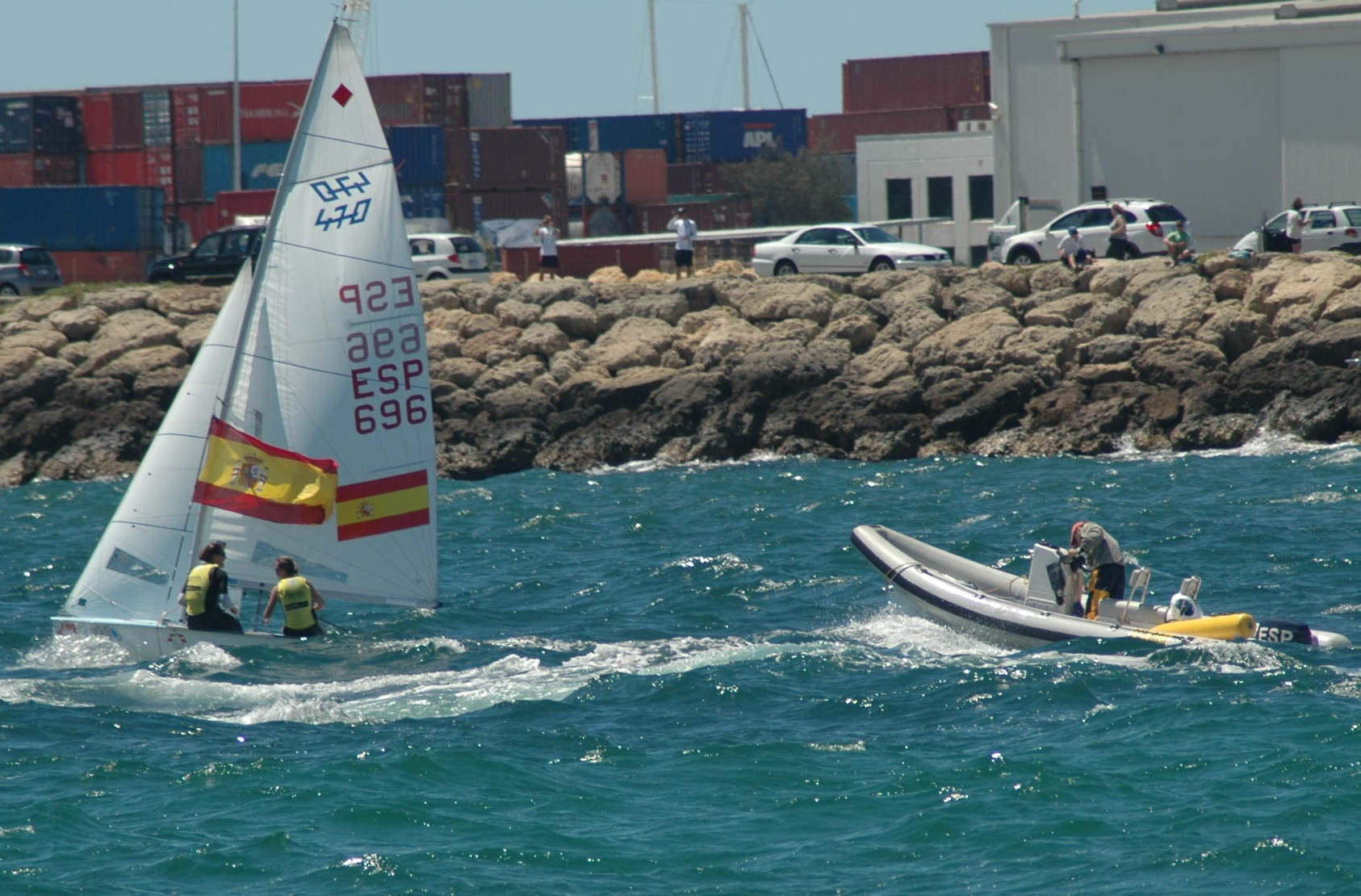
Berta in the 2011 ISAF Sailing World Championships.

Berta Betanzos Moro (born 15 January 1988 in Santander) is a Spanish sports sailor.

She won the gold medal in the 2011 ISAF Sailing World Championships (with Tara Pacheco) and the silver medal in the 470 World Championships of 2009 (also with Pacheco). In 2009, the team also won the European Junior Title. In 2011, she and Pacheco won the European 470 title. She won the 49er FX gold at the 2016 ISAF Sailing World Championships with Támara Echegoyen.

At the 2012 Summer Olympics, she competed in the Women's 470 class (also with Pacheco) finishing 10th.

For the 2016 Summer Olympics, she competed in the 49er FX class with Támara Echegoyen.
