= Marie Riou =

French sailor (born 1981)

Medal record

Sailing

Representing France

World Championships
Gold medal – first place	1999 Kuopio	420
Gold medal – first place	2008 Women's Match	
Gold medal – first place	2014 Santander	Nacra 17
Bronze medal – third place	2011 Perth	Elliott 6m

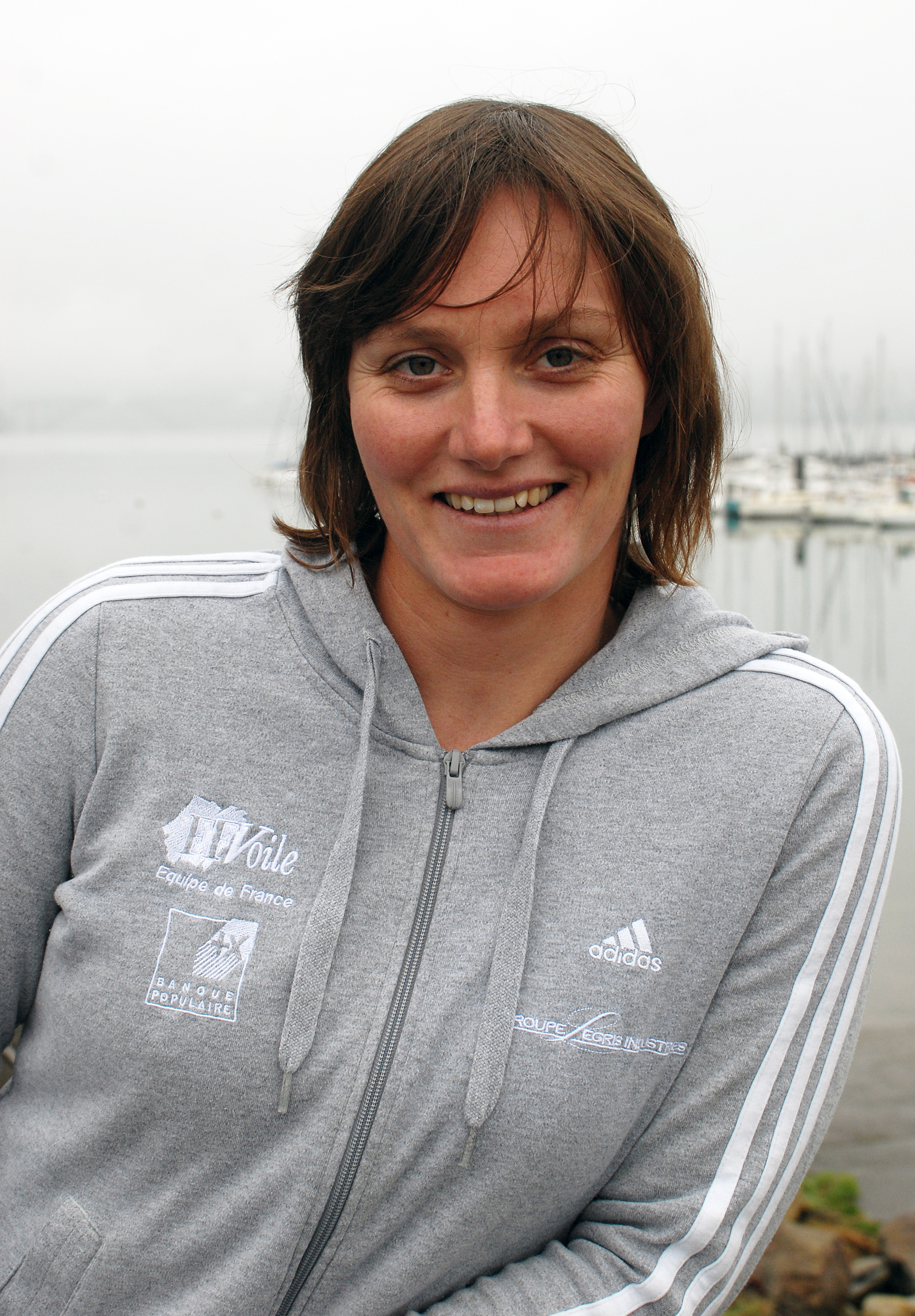
Marie Riou

Marie Riou (born 21 August 1981) is a French sailor who competed in the 2012 Summer Olympics in the Elliott 6m class with Claire Leroy and Élodie Bertrand coming 6th overall.

In the 2017–18 Volvo Ocean Race, she sailed on Dongfeng Race Team.

In The Ocean Race in 2023 she reached fourth place in the IMOCA 60 Biotherm skippered by Paul Meilhat. She and the rest of the crew of Biotherm completed their journey in Genoa. Paul Meilhat's finishing crew were Riou, Mariana Lobato and Alan Roberts. The boat had its own reporter and she travelled with them. The voyage had taken six months and over a hundred days of sailing in seven legs.
