= Gary Boyd (sailor) =

Australian sailor

Personal information
- Nationality: Australian
- Born: 24 January 1972 (age 53); Newcastle, New South Wales, Australia

Sport
- Sport: Sailing

Gary Boyd (born 24 January 1972) is an Australian sailor. He competed in the 49er event at the 2004 Summer Olympics.
