= Javier Hernández (sailor) =

Spanish sailor (born 1983)

Javier Hernandez Cebrian (Note: In this Spanish name, the first or paternal surname is Hernandez and the second or maternal family name is Cebrian.) (born 26 November 1983 in Santa Cruz) is a Spanish Real Club Náutico de Tenerife sailor. He competed at the 2008 and 2012 Summer Olympics in the Men's Laser class.
