= Yelena Syuzeva =

Russian sailor

Yelena Vladimirovna Syuzeva (Russian: Елена Владимировна Сюзева; born 29 June 1987) is a Russian sailor, from Krasnodar, who competed in the 2012 Summer Olympics in the Elliott 6m class with Ekaterina Skudina and Elena Oblova coming 4th overall.
