= Élodie Bertrand =

French sailor

Medal record

Sailing

Representing France

World Championships
Bronze medal – third place	2011 Perth	Elliott 6m

Élodie Bertrand (born 9 January 1981) is a French sailor who competed in the 2012 Summer Olympics in the Elliott 6m class with Claire Leroy and Marie Riou coming 6th overall. The same team had won the bronze medal at the 2011 World Championships.
