= Pierre Leboucher =

French sailor (born 1980)

Personal information
- Nationality: France
- Born: 9 November 1980 (age 45) Nantes, France
- Height: 1.68 m (5 ft 6 in)
- Weight: 63 kg (139 lb)

Sailing career
- Sport: Sailing
- Club: ASPTT Nantes
- Class: Dinghy

Pierre Leboucher (born 9 November 1980 in Nantes) is a French sailor, who specialized in two-person dinghy (470) class. He represented France, along with his partner Vincent Garos at the 2012 Summer Olympics, and has also been training under the yachting team for ASPTT Nantes throughout most of his sporting career. As of September 2014, Leboucher is ranked tenth in the world for two-person dinghy class by the International Sailing Federation, following his successes at the 2012 and 2013 470 World Championships and ISAF World Cup series.

Leboucher qualified as a helmsman for the French squad in the men's 470 class at the 2012 Summer Olympics in London by finishing sixth and receiving a berth from the ISAF World Championships in Perth, Western Australia. Teaming with his partner Garos in the opening series, the French duo fell behind the pack on the early races, but sailed smoothly at the very end to achieve a creditable seventh position against a fleet of twenty-seven boats with an accumulated net score of 90 points.
