= Vincent Garos =

French sailor

Personal information
- Nationality: France
- Born: 1 June 1982 (age 44) Nantes, France
- Height: 1.80 m (5 ft 11 in)
- Weight: 73 kg (161 lb)

Sailing career
- Sport: Sailing
- Club: Sport Nautique de l'Ouest
- Coached by: Didier Bernard
- Class: Dinghy

Vincent Garos (born 1 June 1982 in Nantes) is a retired French sailor, who specialized in two-person dinghy (470) class. He represented France, along with his partner Pierre Leboucher at the 2012 Summer Olympics, and also became a member of the French national sailing team for five years before retiring shortly after the Games. Throughout most of his sporting career, Garos has been training for Ouest Nautical Sport Club (French: Sport Nautique de l'Ouest) under his personal coach Didier Bernard.

Garos qualified as a crew member for the French squad in the men's 470 class at the 2012 Summer Olympics in London by finishing sixth and receiving a berth from the ISAF World Championships in Perth, Western Australia. Teaming with his partner Leboucher in the opening series, the French duo fell behind the pack on the early races, but sailed smoothly at the very end to achieve a creditable seventh position against a fleet of twenty-seven boats with an accumulated net score of 90 points.

Shortly after the Games, Garos decided to retire from sailing to embark upon his formal business career role in the sport sector. Whilst training and competing for the sport, Garos completed a Bachelor of Arts in material sciences and engineering, worked part-time in the technical sales department of an industrial company and fulfilled a one-year contract in the navy.
