= Annie Lush =

English sailor (born 1980)

Annie Lush (born 11 April 1980) is an English sailor. She was born in Poole, Dorset.

As of 2012, Lush is 1.78 metres (5 ft 10 in) tall and weighs 77.5 kilograms (171 lb). Lush attended Cambridge University, where she was awarded Blues in rowing, sailing and rugby.

Lush was a candidate for selection for the 2008 Summer Olympics in the Yngling three-person keelboat class with crewmates Lucy MacGregor and double Olympic gold medallist Shirley Robertson. Despite winning the bronze medal at the 2007 World Championships, the trio were overlooked for selection in favour of Sarah Ayton, Sarah Webb and Pippa Wilson who ended up winning gold in the Olympic event.

In 2010 Lush teamed up with sisters Lucy and Kate MacGregor and Mary Rook to win gold at the ISAF women's match racing World Championship in Newport, Rhode Island, United States. The British crew won the final 3–2 over an American team helmed by two-time world title-winner Sally Barkow. At the 2011 Sailing World Championships in Perth, Australia, Lush reached the final of the match-racing event, as part of a crew with Lucy and Kate MacGregor, where they were beaten 4–0 by the United States boat skippered by Anna Tunnicliffe. The three won a gold medal at the 2011 World Cup event in Hyères, France by beating Barkow's crew 3–0 in the final.

Lush was selected to compete for Great Britain at the 2012 Summer Olympics in the newly created Elliott 6 metres match-racing event. She competed alongside sisters Lucy and Kate MacGregor. Together the three are nicknamed the "Match Race Girls". The event took place at the Weymouth and Portland National Sailing Academy with the round robin group stage being held from 29 July to 4 August 2012. The team finished 7th in the competition. In 2013 was Annie selected for team SCA Volvo Ocean Race 2014–15, the team was based in Lanzarote, Canary Isles.
