= Weymouth and Portland National Sailing Academy =

Sports club in Isle of Portland, England

Coordinates: 50°34′14″N 2°27′22″W

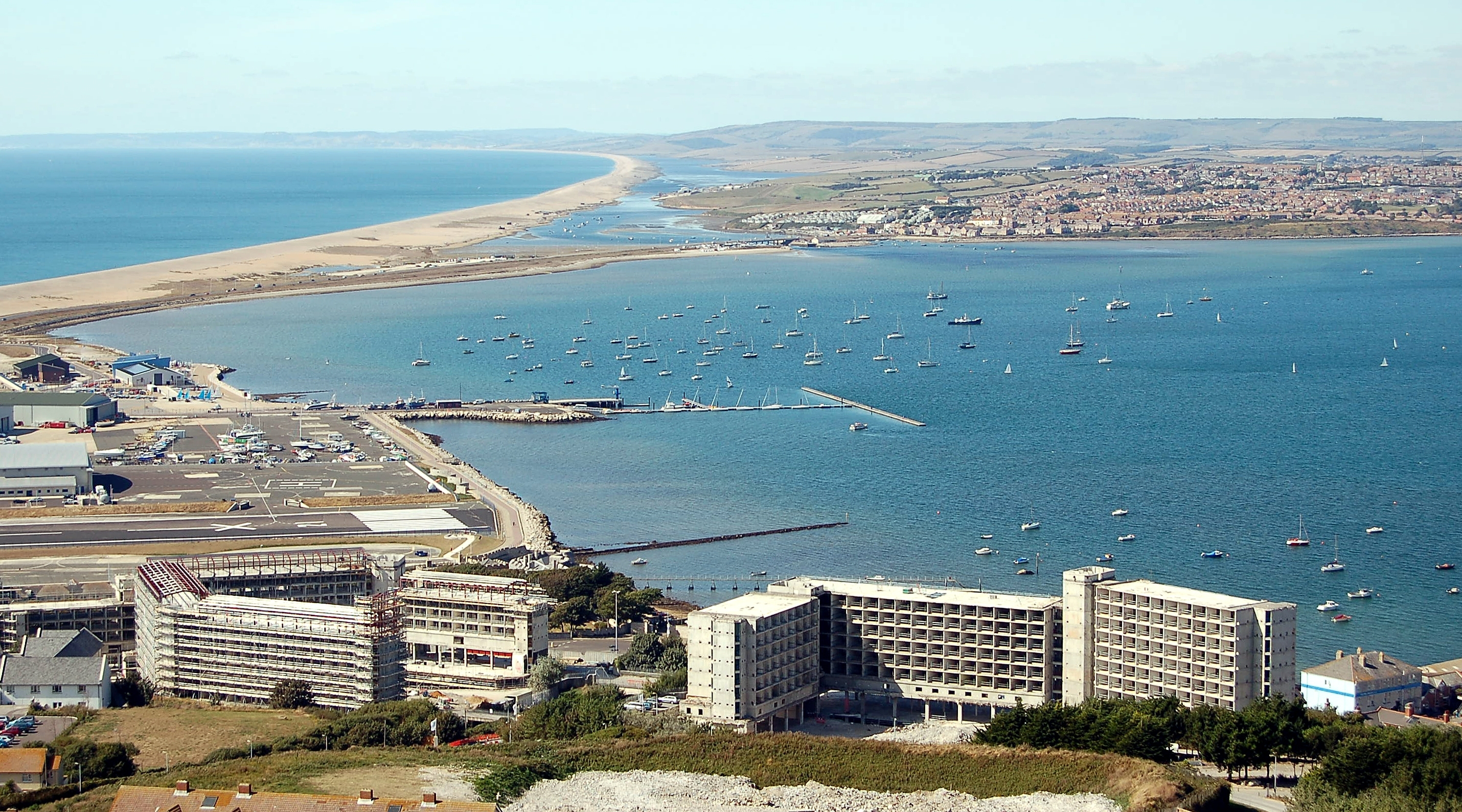
Portland Harbour, seen from The Verne. The academy's clubhouse is on the far left.

The Weymouth and Portland National Sailing Academy is a centre for the sport of sailing on the Isle of Portland, Dorset, on the south coast of England. The academy building is located in Osprey Quay on the northern tip of the island, and the waters of Portland Harbour and Weymouth Bay, adjacent to the site, are the main areas used for sailing. Local, national and international sailing events have been held at the site since it was opened in 2000, and in 2005 WPNSA was selected to host the sailing events at the 2012 Olympic and Paralympic Games.

== History ==
The academy was formed as a not-for-profit company in 1999 and officially opened on 1 April 2000. It occupied converted naval premises until a clubhouse was built, which was opened in June 2005 by the Princess Royal. £7.85 million of funding for the project was donated by charities, individuals and local councils; the National Lottery donated £3 million in 2003, and the South West Regional Development Agency added £3.34 million. The academy's aims are to promote the sport of sailing at all levels of competence and ability, through courses, training and events, and to contribute to the economic regeneration of the area. Since opening it has created a demand in service and marine industries worth around £10 million. WPNSA continues to promote sailing to local schools, offering benefits such as free boat hoist and storage. Use of the facilities and access to training is open to anyone in return for an annual membership fee. On 6 July 2005, London was chosen to host the 2012 Olympic and Paralympic Games, and the WPNSA was chosen to host the sailing events.

== Facilities ==
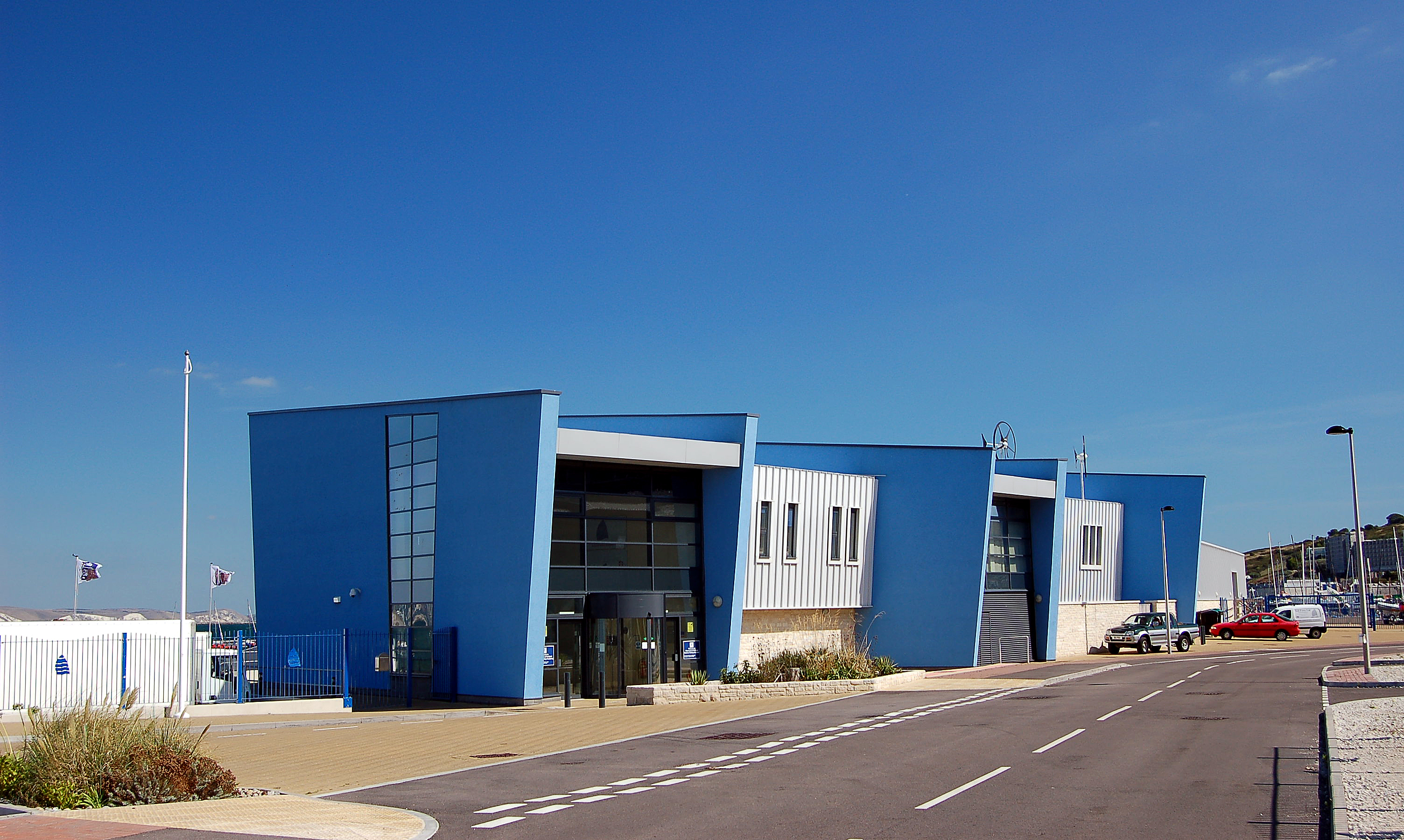
The clubhouse in Osprey Quay

Portland Harbour and Weymouth Bay are the main areas used for sailing. The harbour covers an area of 8.6 square kilometres (2,125 acres), and is ideal for sailing as it is exposed to reliable winds from most directions, but is sheltered from large waves and currents by Chesil Beach and the breakwaters. The clubhouse houses facilities on two floors, including a gymnasium, seven lecture and meeting rooms for 260 people, an event hall with kitchens and a bar, VIP meeting rooms and offices, a lounge bar and cafeteria seating 350 people, and two balconies. The outside of the academy complex has a 40-metre (131 ft) slipway and two deep water slipways, 30 pontoons with disabled access, cranage and boat hoists, boat storage and parking areas. WPNSA also operates Boscawen House, formerly an admiral's residence, which offers accommodation for a maximum of 47 people. The clubhouse generates 15–20% of its electricity from solar cells, and rainwater is collected from the roof to wash boats.

=== Osprey Quay ===
In November 2007, the South West Regional Development Agency signed a deal with Sutton Harbour Group to construct a 3-hectare (7-acre) year-round tourist and leisure complex in Osprey Quay, between Portland Castle and the academy. The £30 million scheme, called Castle Court, includes a hotel, apartments, public areas, a restaurant, shops, and other employment space, and is expected to create 300 jobs. A permanent base for the Royal Yachting Association's senior, youth, junior, and paralympic national sailing squads is to be provided.

== Events ==
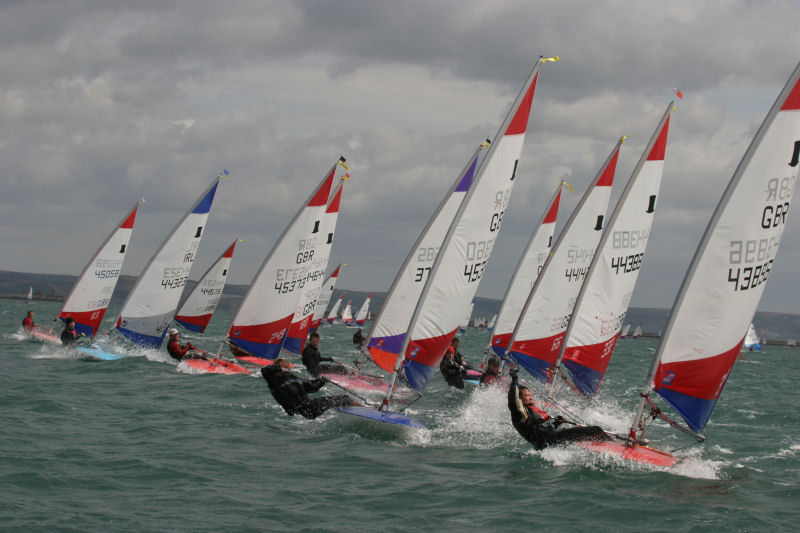
Topper dinghies racing at the 2006 National Championship

Since opening the academy has hosted national and international sailing events, including the J/24 World Championship in 2005, staging trials for the 2004 Athens Olympics, the 2006 ISAF Youth Sailing World Championships, the BUCS Fleet Racing Championships, the Sail for Gold regatta and the RYA Youth National Championships. Local events are also held at the academy; nearby schools have extra-curricular sailing lessons, and in October each year WPNSA hosts Weymouth Speed Week. The British Olympic Sailing Team train at WPNSA.

The academy also hosted the Moth World Championship in 2008.

=== 2012 Olympic and Paralympic Games ===
In 2005, the Weymouth and Portland National Sailing Academy was chosen as the venue for the sailing competition at the London 2012 Olympic and Paralympic Games. WPNSA was chosen to host these events due to its existing world-class facilities. The Olympic Delivery Authority has built upon these facilities, providing a new 220m slipway accessible at all states of tide and wind, an additional 70 marina berths, and an extended dinghy park with capacity for 600 boats. In addition, the Academy provides direct access to Portland Harbour and Weymouth Bay, which have been credited as some of the best sailing waters in the World. Olympic sailing events took place between 28 July and 11 August 2012, and Paralympic events between 31 August and 5 September. One course was in Portland Harbour and four in Weymouth Bay. Sailors from all over the world competed for 30 medals in the Olympic Games and 18 medals in the Paralympic Games. A cruise liner berthed at Portland Port was used as accommodation.

The academy is around 190 kilometres (120 mi) from the Olympic Zone in central London. There was concern about the logistics of transporting athletes from London to the academy, as there is no motorway in Dorset, and transport links are already often congested in summer. Weymouth and Portland Borough Council lobbied the Department for Transport to reinstate double track between Moreton and Dorchester South on the South West Main Line and increase services from Weymouth railway station to London Waterloo and Bristol, and to introduce new direct services to Exeter. Services to London Waterloo began running every 30 minutes from December 2007, but services through Bristol to Cardiff were stopped. On 5 April 2007, Dorset County Council granted planning permission for a relief road scheme to alleviate congestion between Weymouth and Dorchester, which includes a single carriageway running 7 kilometres (4 mi) north of Weymouth, and a 1000-space park-and-ride scheme, costing £84.5 million. Work on the road commenced in 2008, and as anticipated it was completed in three years, in time for the 2012 Olympic sailing events.

=== Events after the Olympics and Paralympics ===
In October 2021, Weymouth and Portland National Sailing Academy was announced as the host of the 2023 29er World Championships.
