= Yekaterina Skudina =

Russian sailor

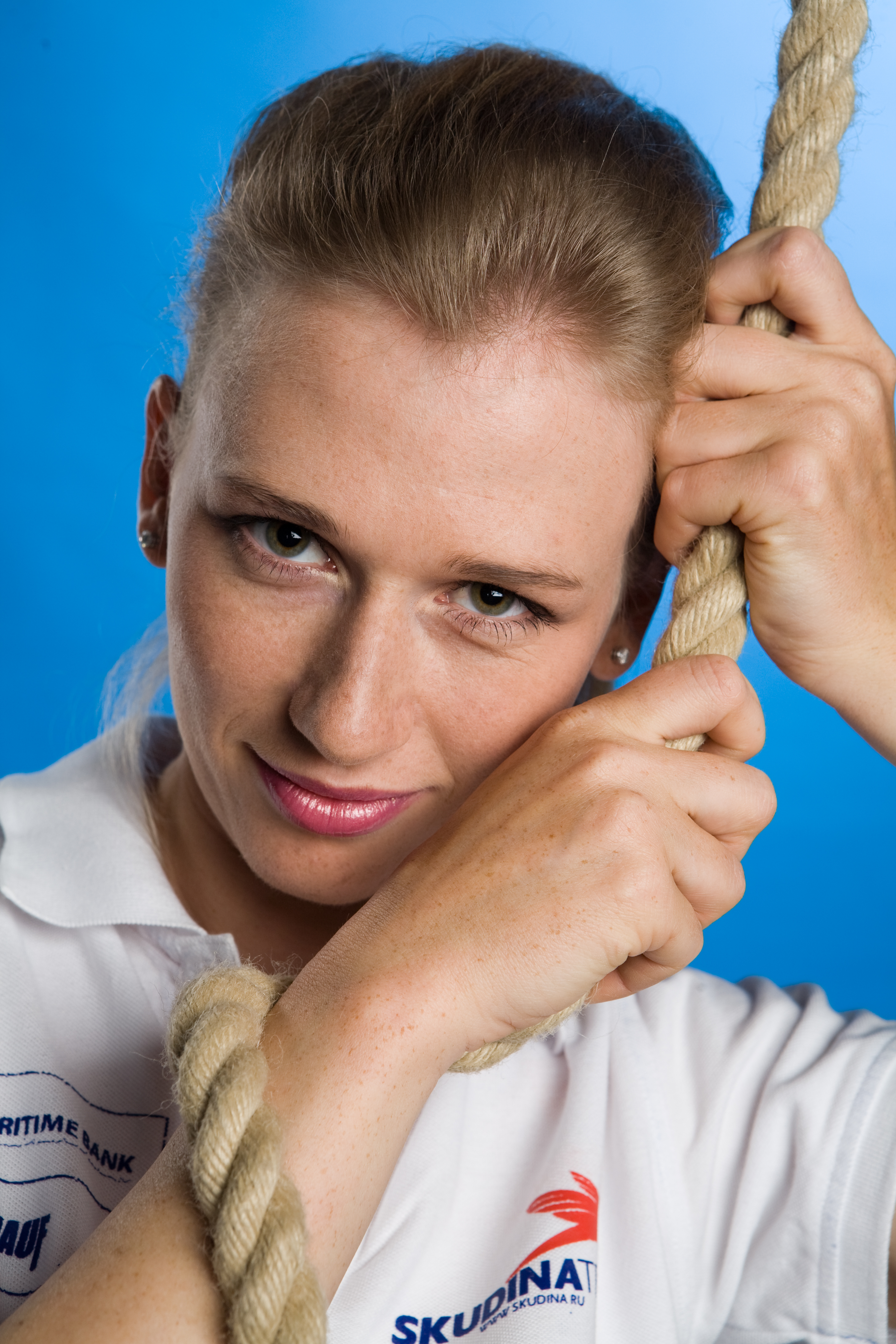

Personal information
- Full name: Yekaterina Yuryevna Skudina
- Born: 21 March 1981 (age 45) Dolgoprudny, Moscow, Soviet Union
- Height: 172 cm (5 ft 8 in)
- Weight: 61 kg (134 lb)

Sailing career
- Sport: Sailing
- Coached by: I.V. Khoroshilov
- Class(es): Snipe, Yngling, Elliott 6m
Medal record
Sailing
Representing Russia
World Championships
Gold medal – first place	1998 Annapolis	Snipe class
Bronze medal – third place	2007 Medemblik	Yngling class

Yekaterina Yuryevna Skudina (Russian: Екатерина Юрьевна Скудина; born 21 March 1981) is a Russian world champion and Olympic sailor.

== Personal ==
Skudina has a PhD from the STANKIN university in "Social and managerial technologies as a resource for achieving leadership in sports in the international arena", and enjoys playing the piano. As of 2014, she lives in Moscow, and is a member of Pirogovo Yacht Club.

After completing her Olympic career in 2012, she founded the PROyachting yacht project, which promotes sailing among a business audience. Since 2012, she has been a member of the Presidium of the All-Russian Sailing Federation, where she oversaw the development of Olympic yachting in Russia.

== Sailing ==
=== World championships ===
Skudina was awarded the Roy Yamaguchi Memorial Trophy for winning the world championships in the women's Snipe class in 1998, and the bronze medal at the Yngling open world championships in 2007. At the 2011 World Championships, Skudina finished fourth in the Elliott 6m class.

=== Olympic Games ===
Skudina took part in three Olympic Games:

- 2004 Summer Olympics, 8th place (Yngling)
- 2008 Summer Olympics, 6th place (Yngling)
- 2012 Summer Olympics, 4th place (Elliott 6m)

=== Other main regattas ===
Skudina won the European Sailing Championships in 2007 (Yngling) and 2010 (Elliott 6m). She was 2nd at the European Sailing Championships in 2011 (Elliott 6m). She won the Kiel Week in the Elliott 6m class in 2011 and the Stena Match Cup Sweden in 2010.
