= Lucy MacGregor =

English sailor (born 1986)

Personal information
- Born: 28 November 1986 (age 39) Poole, Dorset

Sailing career
- Sport: Sailing
Medal record
Representing Great Britain
Sailing
World Championships
| Gold medal – first place | 2010 Newport | Match racing |

Lucy MacGregor (born 28 November 1986) is an English sailor. She was born in Poole, Dorset.

As of 2012, MacGregor is 1.58 metres (5 ft 2 in) tall and weighs 63 kilograms (139 lb). She attended Bournemouth School for Girls and is a member of Poole Yacht Club. She started sailing at the age of six in Poole Harbour.

MacGregor was candidate for selection for the 2008 Summer Olympics in the Yngling three-person keelboat class with crewmates Annie Lush and double Olympic gold medallist Shirley Robertson. Despite winning the bronze medal at the 2007 World Championships, the trio were overlooked for selection in favour of Sarah Ayton, Sarah Webb and Pippa Wilson who ended up winning gold in the Olympic event.

In 2010 MacGregor teamed up with her younger sister Kate MacGregor, Annie Lush and Mary Rook to win gold at the ISAF women's match racing World Championship in Newport, Rhode Island, United States. The British crew won the final 3–2 over an American team helmed by two-time world title-winner Sally Barkow. At the 2011 Sailing World Championships in Perth, Australia, MacGregor reached the final of the match-racing event, as part of a crew with Lush and Kate MacGregor, where they were beaten 4–0 by the United States boat skippered by Anna Tunnicliffe. The three won a gold medal at the 2011 World Cup event in Hyères, France by beating Barkow's crew 3–0 in the final.

MacGregor was selected to compete for Great Britain at the 2012 Summer Olympics in the newly created Elliott 6 metres match-racing event. She competed alongside her sister Kate MacGregor and Annie Lush. Together the three were nicknamed the "Match Race Girls". The event took place at the Weymouth and Portland National Sailing Academy with the round robin group stage being held from 29 July to 4 August 2012. The team finished in seventh place.

In 2013, MacGregor won the inaugural Women's International match Racing Series tour.
