= Molly O'Bryan Vandemoer =

American sailor

Personal information
- Full name: Molly Brigid O'Bryan Vandemoer
- Nationality: American
- Born: April 13, 1979 (age 47)

Sailing career
- Sport: Sailing
- College team: University of Hawaii at Manoa
Medal record
Sailing
Representing United States
Female Snipe World Championship
Gold medal – first place	2010 St Petersburg	Snipe
Women's Match Racing World Championship
Gold medal – first place	2011 Perth	Elliott 6m
Silver medal – second place	2012 Gothenburg	Elliott 6m

Molly Brigid O'Bryan Vandemoer (born April 13, 1979) is an American sailor who competed in the 2012 Summer Olympics in the Elliott 6m class with Anna Tunnicliffe and Deborah Capozzi coming 5th overall. With Tunnicliffe and Capozzi, she also won the World title in 2011 and came second in 2012.

Previously, she was a High School National Champion, and competed with the University of Hawaiʻi at Mānoa sailing team, where she was the captain of the women's and co-ed teams, was named three-times ICSA All-American skipper, and won the ICSA Women's Dinghy National Championship in 2001. She was awarded the Wayne Kight Memorial Trophy in 2001.

She also won, with Anna Tunnicliffe, the Women's Snipe World Championships in 2010.

She is currently the director of the Peninsula Youth Sailing Foundation (PYSF).
