= Stephen Thomas (sailor) =

British Paralympic sailor (born 1977)

Personal information
- Nationality: Great Britain
- Born: 5 January 1977 (age 49) Ogmore Valley, Wales

Sailing career
- Sport: Sailing
- Class: Sonar
Medal record
Sailing
Representing Great Britain
Disabled World Championships
Gold medal – first place	2005 Sønderborg	Mixed Sonar
Gold medal – first place	2006 Perth	Mixed Sonar
Gold medal – first place	2015 Melbourne	Miixed Sonar
Silver medal – second place	2010 Medemblik	Mixed Sonar
Silver medal – second place	2011 Weymouth	Mixed Sonar
Bronze medal – third place	2003 Athens	Mixed Sonar
Bronze medal – third place	2012 Charlotte Harbour	Mixed Sonar

Stephen Thomas (born 5 January 1977) is a British Paralympic sailor. Thomas has represented Great Britain at three Summer Paralympics and with his colleagues John Robertson and Hannah Stodel has won multiple medals in the Mixed Sonar class at the Disabled Sailing World Championships, including gold in 2005 and 2006.

== Personal life ==
Thomas was born in 1977, growing up in the Ogmore Valley in south Wales, but moved to Bridgend when he was ten. Thomas was a keen athlete as a youth and represented the Under 18 Wales rugby union team. At the age of 18 Thomas contracted meningococcal septicaemia. He was rushed to hospital and he entered a six-week coma. Complications resulting from his illness resulted in him having both his legs amputated below the knees to save his life. Thomas matriculated to UWIC in Cardiff where he studied Sport & Exercise Science.

== Ice sledge hockey career ==
Thomas was introduced to the disability sport of ice sledge hockey before sailing. He was at a National Eisteddfod when he was approached by a stranger who asked him to join an ice sledge hockey team. Thomas took to the physicality of the sport and was part of the Great Britain squad who attempted to qualify for the 2002 Winter Paralympics in Utah. The team failed to reach the Utah games but Thomas' desire to attend a Winter Paralympics, saw him part of the team who four years later qualified for the 2006 Games in Turin. The British squad was placed into Group A, along with Italy and the two eventual finalists Canada and Norway. The British squad lost heavily to both Canada (9–0) and Norway (6–0), but beat the Italian team 2–1 to finish third meaning they could not contest for a medal. In the classification rounds, to find overall placement, Britain lost to Sweden, but then beat Italy 2–1 again to finish seventh out of eight teams. Thomas was not the only member of the British ice sledge hockey team of 2006 to also compete in Summer Paralympics. Among the team were world record holding javelin thrower Nathan Stephens and gold medal sprinter Richard Whitehead.

== Sailing career ==
Between the 2002 and 2006 Winter Paralympics, a change encounter with the Performance Director for Welsh Disability Sport saw Thomas offered a role in the British sailing team. Thomas had no experience of sailing, but the team were looking for a person with his disability and physique, and he accepted their invitation. Thomas faced a steep learning curve but persisted as middleman in a Mixed Sonar team alongside fellow British sailors John Robertson and Hannah Stodel. In 2003 he travelled with his team-mates to Athens to take part in his first IFDS World Disabled Sailing Championship, where they secured the bronze medal. The following year the trio qualified for their first Summer Paralympics, the 2008 games at Beijing, finishing sixth in the Sonar class.

Thomas, Robertson and Stodel would remain as a team for over 12 years, with major successes coming in the 2005 World Championships in Sønderborg and the 2006 World Championships in Perth where they took gold in their class. They represented Britain in their second Paralympics, in the 2008 Games in Beijing. They again finished sixth. Two silver medals in the 2010 and 2011 IFDS World Championships were followed by their third successive Paralympics, this time on home surf when the games came to London. The London Paralympics ended in disappointment for Thomas and his teammates after they were deducted four points after a team bosun cleaned the port side of their keel after being authorised to inspect the craft for damage. The deduction saw the British team drop to fifth and the bronze medal going to Norway, just three points ahead of them.

In the run up to the 2016 Summer Paralympics in Rio, Thomas was part of a third World Championship winning Sonar team, beating the Australian team by a single point.

== Skiing career ==
Thomas competed in cross-country skiing at the 2022 Winter Paralympics. He was part of the first British relay team to finish the 4 × 2.5km relay event at a Paralympics, alongside Steve Arnold, Scott Meenagh and Callum Deboys.
