= Deborah Capozzi =

American sailor (born 1981)

Personal information
- Born: July 9, 1981 (age 44) Smithtown, New York, U.S.
- Height: 5 ft 4 in (163 cm)

Sailing career
- Sport: Sailing
- Club: Sayville Yacht Club; Blue Point, New York, U.S.
- Class(es): Elliott 6m, Yngling, 49erFX, Sonar, ILCA 6, SB20
Medal record
Sailing
Representing United States
World Championships
| Gold medal – first place | 2005 Lake Mondsee | Yngling |
| Gold medal – first place | 2011 Perth | Elliott 6m |
| Silver medal – second place | 2007 Cascais | Yngling |
| Silver medal – second place | 2012 Gothenburg | Elliott 6m |
| Bronze medal – third place | 2006 La Rochelle | Yngling |

Deborah "Debbie" Capozzi (born July 9, 1981) is an American sailor who competed in the 2008 Summer Olympics with Sally Barkow and Carrie Howe in the Yngling, coming 7th overall. At the 2012 Summer Olympics in the Elliott 6m class with Anna Tunnicliffe and Molly O'Bryan Vandemoer they came 5th overall.
