= Alexandra Rickham =

British Paralympic sailor (born 1981)

Personal information
- Nationality: British / Jamaican
- Born: 11 September 1981 (age 44) Kingston, Jamaica

Sailing career
- Sport: Sailing
- Club: Weymouth and Portland National Sailing Academy
Medal record
Sailing
Representing Great Britain
Paralympic Games
Bronze medal – third place	2012 London	Mixed Two Person SKUD18
Bronze medal – third place	2016 Rio	Mixed Two Person SKUD18
Para World Sailing Championships
Silver medal – second place	2015 Para World Sailing Championships	Mixed Two Person SKUD18

Alexandra Rickham (born 11 September 1981) is a British Paralympic sailor and leader in sustainability within sport.

== Personal life ==
Rickham was born on 11 September 1981 in Kingston, Jamaica, before attending boarding school in the UK from the age of 12. She is a tetraplegic athlete who became disabled as a result of a shallow diving accident in 1995. Rickham cites Sylvia Earle as an inspiring role model for her climate and ocean advocacy work continuing even in her 9th decade.

== Sailing ==
Rickham competed in the 2008 Paralympic Sailing Competition in the SKUD 18 two person keelboat class, where she finished in fifth place. In 2011 following back to back IFDS World Championship wins she was shortlisted by the International Sailing Federation for the ISAF World Sailor of the Year Awards.

Rickham was selected to represent Great Britain at the 2012 Summer Paralympics held in London, United Kingdom. She competed in the SKUD 18 - 2 person keelboat event, alongside teammate Niki Birrell. The duo started strongly, winning two of the first five races, but form slipped slightly in the later races but their performance was still good enough to win the bronze medal. In 2015 with the same crew Rickham won silver in the Para World Sailing Championships. Rickham has 5 consecutive World titles in partnership with Birrell, maintaining a number 1 ranking for 6 years

== Education ==
Rickham undertook a degree in Natural Sciences at the University of Bath with an initial focus on biology before switching specialisms to environmental studies and graduating in 2004. She followed this with a Masters in Environmental Technology at Imperial College, her dissertation title was Carbon Neutrality on the Isle of Man as an Example of an Island State.

== Professional Life ==
Rickham was a consultant at Earth to Ocean working first as a consultant and then as their Diversity and Impact manager setting up SailGPs sustainability programme. In 2022 Rickham was appointed Director of Sustainability at World Sailing, with a remit to lead their sustainability agenda 2030, in 2024 she was appointed as Technical Delegate for Paris 2024. Rickham is an Ambassador for Ecoathletes and serves on their advisory board.
