= Hannah Stodel =

British Paralympic sailor (born 1985)

Personal information
- Nationality: Great Britain
- Born: 27 August 1985 (age 40) West Mersea, Colchester, Essex, England

Sailing career
- Sport: Sailing
- Class: Sonar
Medal record
Sailing
Representing Great Britain
Disabled World Championships
Gold medal – first place	2005 Sønderborg	Mixed Sonar
Gold medal – first place	2006 Perth	Mixed Sonar
Gold medal – first place	2015 Melbourne	Mixed Sonar
Silver medal – second place	2010 Medemblik	Mixed Sonar
Silver medal – second place	2011 Weymouth	Mixed Sonar
Bronze medal – third place	2003 Athens	Mixed Sonar
Bronze medal – third place	2012 Charlotte Harbour	Mixed Sonar

Hannah Stodel (born 27 August 1985) is a British Paralympic sailor. Stodel has represented Great Britain at three Summer Paralympics and with her colleagues John Robertson and Stephen Thomas has won multiple medals in the Mixed Sonar class at the Disabled Sailing World Championships, including gold in 2005 and 2006. She was the 2017 RYA Yachtmaster of the Year.

== Personal life ==
Stodel was born in 1985, growing up in the coastal village of West Mersea, in south-east England. She was born without a lower right arm. Stodel matriculated to Loughborough University where she studied Sport & Exercise Science.

== Sailing career ==
Stodel was introduced to sailing at the age of three, her first boat being a Mirror. Stodel has stated that due to her disability she was bullied as a child, and she used sailing as an escape from the pain. In 1995 she joined the Royal Yachting Association Mirror National Junior Squad, a predominantly able bodied team, as she felt disability events were a weaker option.

Her sailing career path changed after receiving a phone call from Andy Cassell, a British Paralympic sailor. He invited Stodel to a sailing weekend where he argued that disability competitions were not a lesser form of sailing and that by switching from mainstream competitions more opportunities would become available to her. Stodel was won over by Cassell and in 2003 she switched class to sonar competing in disability events. She teamed up with fellow British sailors John Robertson and Stephen Thomas and in 2003 they secured the bronze medal at the IFDS World Disabled Sailing Championship in Athens. The following year the trio qualified for their first Summer Paralympics, finishing sixth in the Sonar class.

Stodel, Robertson and Thomas would remain as a team for over 12 years, with major successes coming in the 2005 World Championships in Sønderborg and the 2006 World Championships in Perth where they took gold in their class. They represented Britain in their second Paralympics, in the 2008 Games in Beijing. They again finished sixth. Two silver medals in the 2010 and 2011 IFDS World Championships were followed by their third successive Paralympics, this time on home surf when the games came to London. The London Paralympics ended in disappointment for Stodel and her teammates after they were deducted four points after a team bosun cleaned the port side of their keel after being authorized to inspect the craft for damage. The deduction saw the British team drop to fifth and the bronze medal going to Norway, just three points ahead of them.

In the run up to the 2016 Summer Paralympics in Rio, Stodel was part of a third World Championship winning Sonar team, beating the Australian team by a single point.

As second female Stodel has been awarded the RYA Yachtmaster of the Year 2017 and was presented with the award on 10 January 2018 by HRH The Princess Royal at the 64th London Boat Show.
