= Tom Slingsby =

Australian sailor

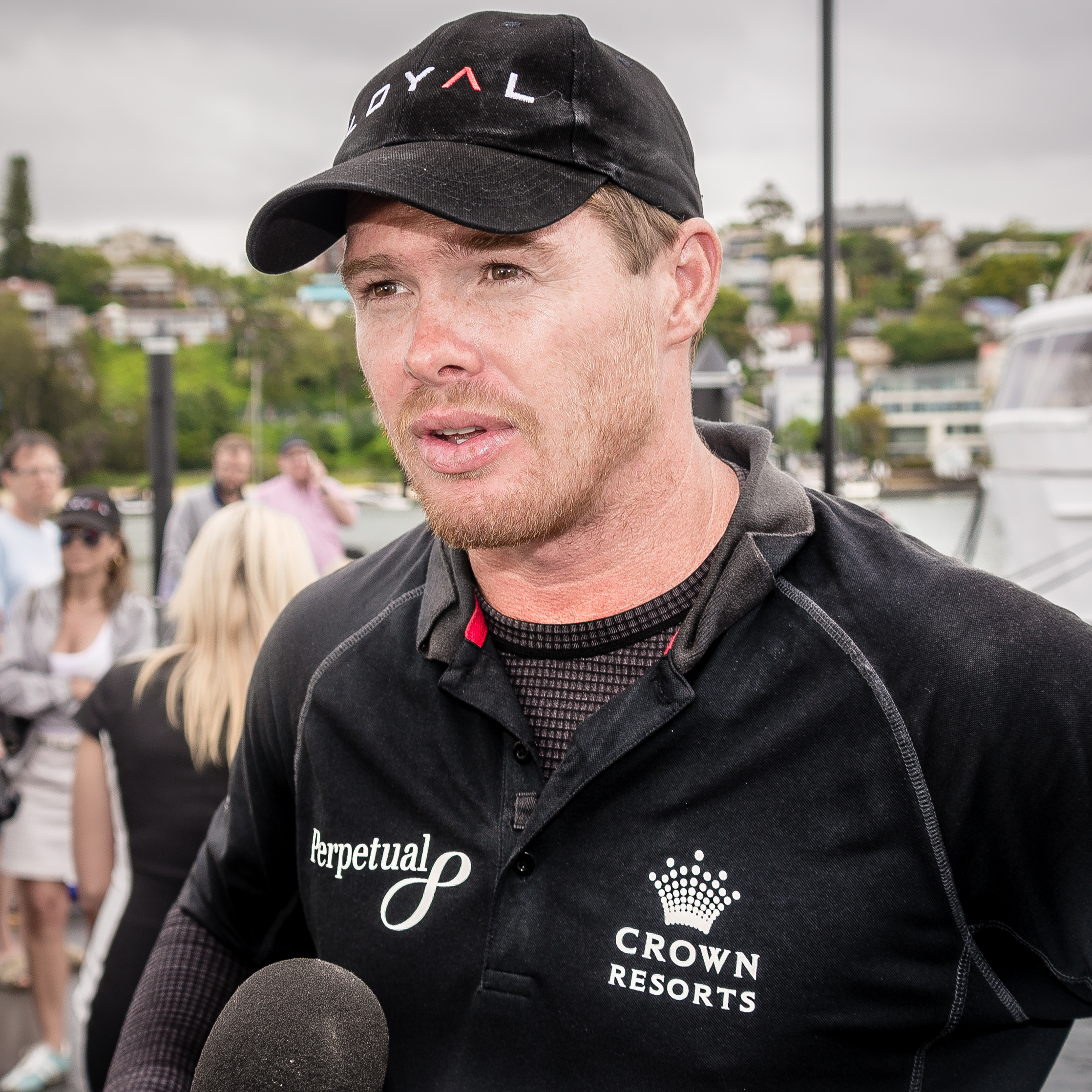
- Slingsby in 2014

Personal information
- Nationality: Australian
- Born: 5 September 1984 (age 41) Sydney, NSW
- Height: 186 cm (6 ft 1 in)
- Weight: 83 kg (183 lb)

Sport
- Country: Australia
- Sport: Sailing
- Event: laser (dinghy) F50 (catamaran) etchells moth (dinghy)
Medal record
Men's sailing
Representing Australia
Olympic Games
| Gold medal – first place | 2012 London | Men's Laser class |
SailGP
| Gold medal – first place | Season 1 - 2019 | F50 |
| Gold medal – first place | Season 2 - 2021/22 | F50 |
| Gold medal – first place | Season 3 - 2022/23 | F50 |
| Silver medal – second place | Season 4 - 2023/24 | F50 |
- Updated on 7 May 2020

Tom Slingsby OAM (born 5 September 1984) is an Australian competitive sailor. Slingsby's first successes came sailing Laser dinghies, where he won three consecutive world championships and the 2012 Olympic gold medal. Slingsby was the strategist for the America's Cup-winning Team Oracle USA in 2013. In 2016 he skippered the winner-of-line honours in the Sydney to Hobart Yacht Race line. Following this he skippered the Australian team in the inaugural SailGP competition.

== Career highlights ==
2007 – Won the Laser dinghy world championships.

2008 – Ranked number one in the Laser dinghy class prior to the 2008 Summer Olympics Laser competition but finished 22nd overall.

2008 – Won Australian Sailing Male Sailor of the Year Award

2010 – Won the Laser dinghy world championships at Hayling Island, UK. He was also named the male ISAF World Sailor of the Year.

2010 – Won the Etchells Class World Championship as crew with Andrew Palfry, with fellow America's Cup legend John Bertrand helming.

2011 – Won the Laser ISAF World Sailing Championships at Fremantle, Australia.

2011 – Won Australian Sailing Male Sailor of the Year Award

2012 – Won the Laser dinghy world championship at Boltenhagen Germany for his fifth world title

2012 – Won the Men's Laser Gold Medal at the 2012 Summer Olympics in London.

2012 – Won the Australian Institute of Sport Athlete of the Year Award with swimmer Alicia Coutts.

2012 – Won Australian Sailing Male Sailor of the Year Award

2013 – Won the 34th America's Cup as the strategist in Oracle Team USA. Re-signed with Oracle for their defence of the cup.

2016 – Won the Sydney Hobart Yacht Race skippering the supermaxi yacht Perpetual Loyal.

2019 – Won the inaugural SailGP skippering the Australian Team sailing F50 foiling catamarans.

2019 – Won the Chandler Macleod Moth Worlds

2020 – Won Australian Sailing Male Sailor of the Year Award

2021 – Won the World Sailor of the Year Awards.

2022 – Won Australian Sailing Male Sailor of the Year Award

2023 - Inducted into the Australian Sailing Hall of Fame

In December 2013 Slingsby was a crew member aboard racing supermaxi yacht Perpetual Loyal in the 2013 Sydney to Hobart Yacht Race, with his other celebrity crew members, Karl Stefanovic, Larry Emdur, Phil Waugh, Jude Bolton and Guillaume Brahimi.

Slingsby received the Medal of the Order of Australia (OAM) in the 2014 Australia Day Honours for "service to sport as a gold medallist at the London 2012 Olympic Games".

Slingsby, as the Captain of Team Australia, won the 2019 season 1 of Sail GP

Awards and achievements
| Preceded by Anna Meares | Australian Athlete of the Year; 2012 (with Alicia Coutts) | Succeeded by Caroline Buchanan and Kim Crow |
