= Anna Tobias =

American sailor

Personal information
- Full name: Anna Tunnicliffe Tobias
- Nationality: American
- Born: October 17, 1982 (age 44) Doncaster, England
- Education: Old Dominion University

Sport
- College team: Old Dominion University
Medal record
Sailing
Representing United States
Olympic Games
| Gold medal – first place | 2008 Beijing | Laser Radial |
World Championships
| Gold medal – first place | 2010 St Petersburg | Snipe (women's) |
| Gold medal – first place | 2011 Perth | Elliott 6m |
| Silver medal – second place | 2008 Roquetas de Mar | Snipe (women's) |
| Silver medal – second place | 2012 Gothenburg | Elliott 6m |
| Bronze medal – third place | 2005 Fortaleza | Laser Radial |
| Bronze medal – third place | 2009 Karatsu | Laser Radial |
CrossFit
CrossFit Games
| Gold medal – first place | 2018 Madison | Master 35-39 |
| Gold medal – first place | 2019 Madison | Master 35-39 |

Anna Tunnicliffe Tobias (born October 17, 1982) is an American sailor and CrossFit competitor. In 2008 she won an Olympic gold medal in the Laser Radial single handed sailing class. In 2009 and 2011, she won the ISAF Sailing World Cup in Laser Radial. She also won the women's world championship of the snipe class in 2010, and placed second in 2008.

She was named ICSA Women's College Sailor of the Year in 2005, ISAF Rolex World Sailor of the Year in 2009 and 2011, and US Sailing's Rolex Yachtswoman of the Year every year from 2008 to 2011.

Tunnicliffe also competes at the highest level in CrossFit, most recently winning the 2018 CrossFit Games Masters 35–39, and competing in the individual open division at the CrossFit Games in 2013, 2014, 2015, 2016 and 2017. Her best finish was 9th overall, in 2013. She has three first-place event finishes at the Games: "The Beach" in 2014, "Sandbag 2015" in 2015, and "Rope Chipper" in 2016.

On August 27, 2016, Anna Tunnicliffe married her longtime CrossFit coach Brad Tobias and changed her name to Anna Tunnicliffe Tobias. She and her husband co-own T2CrossFit in Pittsburgh, Pennsylvania.

== Biography ==
Anna Tunnicliffe was born in Doncaster, England. Her parents owned a yacht when she was a child and introduced her to sailing. Anna moved to Perrysburg, Ohio, in the United States, with her family at the age of 12. She attended Perrysburg High School and joined the North Cape Yacht Club, racing Optimists and other small boats for the next five years. In 1999 she began sailing the Laser Radial. Her first event in this boat was at the Leiter Cup in Detroit, Michigan. Despite her small build she advanced to the Smythe Finals for her area, where she was the only woman sailing. She participated in cross country, swimming, and track at the varsity level. In her senior year she won the district track championships in the 800 meters, setting a new high school record of 2 minutes 17.56 seconds. After choosing sailing over track, she decided to go to the Old Dominion University to study and sail.

In January 2014, Tunnicliffe announced her retirement from Olympic Sailing after 12 years of competition. She continues to pursue her professional CrossFit career.

On October 23, 2017, Anna Tobias announced that she would become a team athlete in Crossfit with a team from T2Crossfit, the box she co-owns with her husband. She also qualified to compete in the Masters division (35–39) and went on to win that division at the 2018 CrossFit Games

== Awards ==
Tunnicliffe helped to bring four national championships to ODU, including the Women's National Championship and three Women's Single-Handed championships. She competed as an A division skipper for the women's team and B division skipper for the co-ed team during her junior year, and as an A division skipper for both teams as a senior. In her sophomore through senior years, Tunnicliffe was awarded women's team all American status; she earned co-ed all American status in her senior year. For every year the Quantum Sailor of the Year award (recognizing the top American college female sailor) was given, Tunnicliffe was a finalist. She was a runner up her junior year, missing 1st by 0.02 points, and won in her senior year. She was one of three finalists for the ICSA sportsmanship trophy.

Tunnicliffe was ranked 1st in the world for the women's singlehanded dinghy, the Laser Radial.

== Sailing finishes ==
| Year | Class of boat | Event | Location | Country | Finishing Place |
Olympics Games
| 2008 | Laser Radial – Women's | 2008 Summer Olympic Games | | CHN | 1 |
| 2012 | Elliott 6m – Women's Match Racing | 2012 Summer Olympic Games | | GBR | 5 |
World Championships
| 2005 | Laser Radial – Women's | Laser Radial World Championship | Fortaleza, Ceara | BRA | 3 |
| 2006 | Laser Radial – Women's | Laser Radial World Championship | Los Angeles | USA | 4 |
| 2008 | Snipe | Female Snipe World Championship | Roquetas de Mar | ESP | 2 |
| 2009 | Laser Radial | ISAF Sailing World Championships | | | 3 |
| 2010 | Laser Radial – Women's | Laser Radial World Championship | | | 7 |
| 2010 | Snipe | Female Snipe World Championship | St. Petersburg, Florida | USA | 1 |
| 2010 | Sonar (keelboat) – Women's Match Racing | ISAF Women's Match Racing World Championship | | | 10 |
| 2011 | Elliott 6m – Women's Match Racing | ISAF Sailing World Championships | Perth | AUS | 1 |
| 2012 | Elliott 6m – Women's Match Racing | ISAF Women's Match Racing World Championship | | | 2 |
| 2013 | 49erFX – Female | 49er World Championships | | | 11 |
| 2019 | 49erFX – Female | 49er World Championships | | | 9 |
| 2020 | 49erFX – Female | 49er World Championships | | | 7 |
| 2024 | 49erFX – Female | 49er World Championships | | | 26 |
Others
| 2002 | Europe – Women (Olympic Class: 1989–2004) | Rolex Miami OCR | Miami, Florida | USA | 8 |
| 2005 | Laser Radial – Women's One Person Dinghy | Rolex Miami OCR | Biscayne Bay, Miami, Florida | USA | 2 |
| 2005 | Laser Radial – Women's One Person Dinghy | Laser Midwinters East | Clearwater Yacht Club, Florida | USA | 2 |
| 2005 | Laser Radial – Women's One Person Dinghy | Kiel Week | Baltic Sea / Kiel | GER | 22 |
| 2005 | Laser Radial – Women's One Person Dinghy | Laser Atlantic Coast Championship | Brant Beach, New Jersey | USA | 2 |
| 2005 | Laser Radial – Women's One Person Dinghy | Laser Radial European Championship | Split | CRO | 8 |
| 2005 | Match Racing – Women's | Rolex Osprey Cup 2005 | Petersburg, FL | USA | 2 |
| 2006 | Laser Radial – Women's One Person Dinghy | Rolex Miami OCR | Biscayne Bay, Miami, Florida | USA | 1 |
| 2006 | Laser Radial – Women's One Person Dinghy | Laser Radial North American Championship | Fort Lauderdale | USA | 2 |
| 2006 | Laser Radial – Women's One Person Dinghy | Laser Midwinters East | Clearwater, Florida | USA | 2 |
| 2006 | Laser Radial – Women's One Person Dinghy | HRH Princess Sofia Trophy | Palma de Majorca, Spain | ESP | 4 |
| 2006 | Laser Radial – Women's One Person Dinghy | Semaine Olympique Française | Hyères | FRA | 5 |
| 2006 | Laser Radial – Women's One Person Dinghy | ISAF World Sailing Games | Lake Neusiedl | AUT | 7 |
| 2006 | Laser Radial – Women's One Person Dinghy | Qingdao International Regatta – Test Event | Qingdao | CHN | 4 |
| 2007 | Laser Radial – Women's One Person Dinghy | Qingdao International Regatta – Pre-Olympics | Qingdao | CHN | 1 |
| 2007 | Laser Radial – Women's One Person Dinghy | Laser Radial Mid Winter Regatta | Clearwater, Fla. | USA | 1 |
| 2007 | Laser Radial – Women's One Person Dinghy | USA Olympic Trials | Newport, RI. | USA | 1 |

== CrossFit Games results ==
| Year | Division | Games | Regionals | Open (Worldwide) |
|---|---|---|---|---|
| 2012 | Individual | — | — | 125th |
| 2013 | Individual | 9th | 2nd (South East) | 101st |
| 2014 | Individual | 22nd | 3rd (Mid Atlantic) | 11th |
| 2015 | Individual | 22nd | 3rd (Atlantic) | 35th |
| 2016 | Individual | 10th | 2nd (Atlantic) | 56th |
| 2017 | Individual | 25th | 5th (Atlantic) | 118th |
| 2018 | Individual | — | DNP | 92nd |
| 2018 | Team | — | 29th (Atlantic) | 275th |
| 2018 | Masters (35–39) | 1st | 1st (online qualifier) | 6th |
| Year | Division | Games | Qualifier | Open |
| 2019 | Individual | — | — | 186th (world); 84th (United States) |
| 2019 | Masters (35–39) | 1st | 6th (online qualifier) | 10th |
| 2020 | Individual | | | 160th (world); 66th (United States) |
| 2020 | Masters (35–39) | | | 11th |
