= Sailing at the 2016 Summer Olympics – Qualification =

The main qualification event for sailing at the 2016 Summer Olympics will be the 2014 ISAF Sailing World Championships. The rest of the quota places will be awarded at the 2015 World Championships and at Continental Qualification Events.

== Qualification ==
=== Timeline ===
Event	Date	Venue
2014 ISAF Sailing World Championships	September 8–21, 2014	(Spain) Santander
2015 Laser World Championships	June 29 – July 8, 2015	(Canada) Kingston
2015 Nacra 17 World Championship	July 3–11, 2015	(Denmark) Aarhus
2015 470 World Championships	October 10–17, 2015	(Israel) Haifa
2015 RS:X World Championships	October 19–24, 2015	(Oman) Al-Mussanah
2015 49er & 49erFX World Championships	November 16–21, 2015	(Argentina) Buenos Aires
2015 Laser Radial Women's World Championship	November 20–26, 2015	(Oman) Al-Mussanah
2015 Finn World Championship	November 24–29, 2015	(New Zealand) Takapuna
Africa Qualification Events
Africa Qualification Regatta (RS:X, Laser, Laser Radial)	December 4–11, 2015	(Algeria) Algiers
Africa Qualification Regatta (470 Men)	January 12–17, 2016	(South Africa) Cape Town
Princess Sofia Trophy Regatta (remaining events)	March 26 – April 2, 2016	(Spain) Palma de Mallorca
Asia Qualification Events
ISAF Sailing World Cup Qingdao (Finn, 470, Nacra 17)	September 14–20, 2015	(China) Qingdao
2016 Asian Sailing Championship (RS:X, Laser, Laser Radial, 49er, 49erFX)	March 5–12, 2016	(United Arab Emirates) Abu Dhabi
Europe Qualification Events
Princess Sofia Trophy Regatta (all events)	March 26 – April 2, 2016	(Spain) Palma de Mallorca
North & South America Qualification Events
2015 Pan American Games (Laser & Laser Radial)	July 12–19, 2015	(Canada) Toronto
ISAF Sailing World Cup Miami (all events)	January 25–30, 2016	(United States) Miami
Oceania Qualification Events
ISAF Sailing World Cup Melbourne (all events)	December 6–13, 2015	(Australia) Melbourne

=== Progress ===
Event	2014 WC	2015 WC	AFR	ASI	OCE	EUR	NAM	SAM	Hosts	Tri.	Total
Men
Sailboard	18	6	2	2	1	2	2	2	1	0	36
Laser class	23	9	2	2	1	2	2	2	1	2	46
Finn class	12	4	1	1	1	1	1	1	1	0	23
470 class	13	6	1	1	1	1	1	1	1	0	26
49er class	10	3	1	1	1	1	1	1	1	0	20
Women
Sailboard	13	6	1	1	1	1	1	1	1	0	26
Laser Radial class	19	4	2	2	1	2	2	2	1	2	37
470 class	10	3	1	1	1	1	1	1	1	0	20
49erFX class	10	3	1	1	1	1	1	1	1	0	20
Mixed
Nacra 17	10	3	1	1	1	1	1	1	1	0	20

== Summary ==
Nation	Men					Women				Mixed	Total	
Nation	RS:X	Laser	Finn	470	49er	RS:X	Laser Radial	470	49erFX	Nacra 17	Boats	Athletes
Algeria	X					X	X				3	3
Angola		X		X							2	3
Argentina	X	X	X	X	X	X	X		X	X	9	13
Aruba							X			X	2	3
Australia		X	X	X	X		X	X		X	7	11
Austria				X	X			X		X	4	8
Belarus	X						X				2	2
Belgium		X			X		X				3	4
Bermuda		X					X				2	2
Brazil	X	X	X	X	X	X	X	X	X	X	10	15
Canada		X	X	X			X		X	X	6	9
Cayman Islands							X				1	1
Chile		X		X	X			X	X		5	9
China	X		X	X		X	X	X			6	8
Colombia	X										1	1
Cook Islands		X					X				2	2
Croatia	X	X	X	X	X		X				6	8
Cyprus	X	X									2	2
Czech Republic	X	X					X				3	3
Denmark	X	X	X		X	X	X		X	X	7	11
Egypt		X									1	1
El Salvador		X									1	1
Estonia		X	X			X			X		4	5
Finland		X	X	X		X	X		X		6	8
France	X	X	X	X	X	X	X	X	X	X	10	15
Germany	X	X		X	X			X	X	X	7	12
Great Britain	X	X	X	X	X	X	X	X	X	X	10	15
Greece	X		X	X		X				X	5	7
Guatemala		X									1	1
Hong Kong	X					X					2	2
Hungary	X	X	X			X	X				5	5
Ireland		X			X		X		X		4	6
Israel	X			X		X		X			4	6
Italy	X	X	X		X	X	X	X	X	X	9	13
Japan	X			X	X	X	X	X	X		6	11
Latvia						X					1	1
Lithuania	X						X				2	2
Malaysia		X					X				2	2
Mexico	X	X				X					3	3
Montenegro		X									1	1
Netherlands	X	X	X			X	X	X	X	X	8	11
New Zealand		X	X	X	X			X	X	X	7	12
Norway		X	X			X	X		X		5	6
Peru		X					X				2	2
Poland	X	X			X	X		X			5	7
Portugal	X	X			X		X				4	5
Russia	X	X		X		X		X			5	7
Saint Lucia							X				1	1
Seychelles	X	X	X								3	3
Singapore	X	X				X	X	X	X	X	7	10
Slovenia			X					X			2	3
South Africa		X		X							2	3
South Korea	X	X		X							3	4
Spain	X	X		X	X	X	X	X	X	X	9	14
Sweden		X	X	X			X		X		5	7
Switzerland	X			X	X			X		X	5	9
Chinese Taipei	X										1	1
Thailand	X	X				X	X				4	4
Trinidad and Tobago		X									1	1
Tunisia		X					X			X	3	4
Turkey	X		X	X		X	X				5	6
Ukraine	X			X							2	3
United States	X	X	X	X	X	X	X	X	X	X	10	15
Uruguay			X				X			X	3	4
Venezuela	X	X									2	2
Virgin Islands		X									1	1
Total: 66 NOCs	36	46	23	26	20	26	37	20	20	20	275	380

== Men's events ==
=== Windsurfer – RS:X ===
#	Nation	Qualification Tournament	Place in Event	Sailor	Sailor at Games
1	Brazil	Host Country	—N/a	—N/a	Ricardo Santos
2	France	2014 Worlds	1	Julien Bontemps	Pierre Le Coq
3	Poland	2014 Worlds	2	Przemysław Miarczyński	Piotr Myszka
4	Great Britain	2014 Worlds	5	Nick Dempsey	Nick Dempsey
5	Greece	2014 Worlds	6	Byron Kokkalanis	Byron Kokkalanis
6	Netherlands	2014 Worlds	7	Dorian van Rijsselberghe	Dorian van Rijsselberghe
7	Israel	2014 Worlds	11	Nimrod Mashiah	Shahar Tzuberi
8	Germany	2014 Worlds	12	Toni Wilhelm	Toni Wilhelm
9	Spain	2014 Worlds	13	Iván Pastor	Iván Pastor
—	New Zealand	2014 Worlds	16	JP Tobin	
10	China	2014 Worlds	17	Wang Aichen	Wang Aichen
11	Cyprus	2014 Worlds	18	Andreas Cariolou	Andreas Cariolou
12	Denmark	2014 Worlds	19	Sebastian Fleischer	Sebastian Fleischer
13	Argentina	2014 Worlds	22	Mariano Reutemann	Bautista Saubidet Birkner
14	Lithuania	2014 Worlds	23	Juozas Bernotas	Juozas Bernotas
15	Italy	2014 Worlds	24	Daniele Benedetti	Mattia Camboni
16	Russia	2014 Worlds	25	Maksym Oberemko	Maksym Oberemko
17	Japan	2014 Worlds	26	Makoto Tomizawa	Makoto Tomizawa
—	Norway	2014 Worlds	28	Sebastian Wang-Hansen	
18	Switzerland	2015 Worlds	6	Mateo Sanz Lanz	Mateo Sanz Lanz
19	South Korea	2015 Worlds	20	Lee Tae-hoon	Lee Tae-hoon
20	Hungary	2015 Worlds	22	Áron Gádorfalvi	Áron Gádorfalvi
21	Hong Kong	2015 Worlds	27	Chun Leung Michael Cheng	Chun Leung Michael Cheng
22	Portugal	2015 Worlds	28	João Rodrigues	João Rodrigues
23	Mexico	2015 Worlds	34	David Mier	David Mier
24	Ukraine	2015 Worlds	36	Oleksandr Tugaryev	Oleksandr Tugaryev
—	Sweden	2015 Worlds	52	Adam Holm	
25	Chinese Taipei	2015 Worlds	58	Chang Hao	Chang Hao
26	Turkey	2015 Worlds	68	Pamir Saçkan	Onur Cavit Biriz
27	Czech Republic	2015 Worlds	75	Karel Lavický	Karel Lavický
28	Algeria	Africa Regatta	1	Hamza Bouras	Hamza Bouras
29	Seychelles	Africa Regatta	3	Jean-Marc Gardette	Jean-Marc Gardette
30	Thailand	ASAF Cup (Asia)	3	Natthaphong Phonoppharat	Natthaphong Phonoppharat
31	Singapore	ASAF Cup (Asia)	7	Leonard Ong	Leonard Ong
—		ISAF World Cup (Oceania)			
32	Croatia	Princess Sofia (Europe)	21	Luka Mratović	Luka Mratović
33	Belarus	Princess Sofia (Europe)	27	Mikita Tsirkun	Mikita Tsirkun
—	Canada	ISAF World Cup (NAM)	20	Zachary Plavsic	
34	United States	ISAF World Cup (NAM)	24	Pedro Pascual	Pedro Pascual
35	Venezuela	ISAF World Cup (SAM)	31	Daniel Flores	Daniel Flores
36	Colombia	ISAF World Cup (SAM)	36	Santiago Grillo	Santiago Grillo

=== One-person dinghy – Laser ===
#	Nation	Qualification Tournament	Place in Event	Sailor	Sailor at Games
1	Brazil	Host Country	—N/a	—N/a	Robert Scheidt
2	Netherlands	2014 Worlds	1	Nicholas Heiner	Rutger van Schaardenburg
3	Australia	2014 Worlds	2	Tom Burton	Tom Burton
4	Great Britain	2014 Worlds	3	Nick Thompson	Nick Thompson
5	Germany	2014 Worlds	4	Philipp Buhl	Philipp Buhl
6	France	2014 Worlds	6	Jean-Baptiste Bernaz	Jean-Baptiste Bernaz
7	United States	2014 Worlds	7	Charlie Buckingham	Charlie Buckingham
8	New Zealand	2014 Worlds	9	Sam Meech	Sam Meech
9	Cyprus	2014 Worlds	10	Pavlos Kontides	Pavlos Kontides
10	Sweden	2014 Worlds	13	Jesper Stålheim	Jesper Stålheim
11	Italy	2014 Worlds	16	Giovanni Coccoluto	Francesco Marrai
12	Croatia	2014 Worlds	22	Tonči Stipanović	Tonči Stipanović
13	Norway	2014 Worlds	29	Kristian Ruth	Kristian Ruth
14	Singapore	2014 Worlds	32	Colin Cheng Xin Ru	Colin Cheng Xin Ru
15	Guatemala	2014 Worlds	33	Juan Ignacio Maegli	Juan Ignacio Maegli
16	Tunisia	2014 Worlds	36	Youssef Akrout	Youssef Akrout
17	Virgin Islands	2014 Worlds	37	Cy Thompson	Cy Thompson
18	Ireland	2014 Worlds	38	James Espey	Finn Lynch
19	Portugal	2014 Worlds	39	Rui Silveira	Gustavo Lima
20	Belgium	2014 Worlds	42	Wannes Van Laer	Wannes Van Laer
21	Canada	2014 Worlds	43	Lee Parkhill	Lee Parkhill
22	Finland	2014 Worlds	45	Kaarle Tapper	Kaarle Tapper
23	Denmark	2014 Worlds	47	Thorbjørn Schierup	Michael Hansen
24	Poland	2014 Worlds	49	Jonasz Stelmaszyk	Kacper Zieminski
25	Peru	2015 Worlds	24	Stefano Peschiera	Stefano Peschiera
26	Argentina	2015 Worlds	28	Julio Alsogaray	Julio Alsogaray
27	Estonia	2015 Worlds	31	Karl-Martin Rammo	Karl-Martin Rammo
28	Chile	2015 Worlds	34	Matías del Solar	Matías del Solar
29	South Korea	2015 Worlds	38	Ha Jee-min	Ha Jee-min
30	South Africa	2015 Worlds	45	Stefano Marcia	Stefano Marcia
31	Hungary	2015 Worlds	50	Balázs Tomai	Benjámin Vadnai
32	Montenegro	2015 Worlds	52	Milivoj Dukić	Milivoj Dukić
33	Spain	2015 Worlds	56	Joaquín Blanco	Joaquín Blanco
34	Seychelles	Africa Regatta	2	Rodney Govinden	Rodney Govinden
35	Egypt	Africa Regatta	4	Ahmed Ragab	Ahmed Ragab
36	Malaysia	ASAF Cup (Asia)	1	Khairulnizam Afendy	Khairulnizam Afendy
37	Thailand	ASAF Cup (Asia)	2	Keerati Bualong	Keerati Bualong
38	Cook Islands	ISAF World Cup (Oceania)	23	Taua Henry	Taua Henry
39	Russia	Princess Sofia (Europe)	20	Sergey Komissarov	Sergey Komissarov
40	Czech Republic	Princess Sofia (Europe)	23	Viktor Teplý	Viktor Teplý
41	Trinidad and Tobago	2015 Pan Am Games (NAM)	9	Andrew Lewis	Andrew Lewis
42	Mexico	ISAF World Cup (NAM)	43	Yanic Gentry	Yanic Gentry
43	El Salvador	2015 Pan Am Games (SAM)	11	Enrique Arathoon	Enrique Arathoon
44	Venezuela	ISAF World Cup (SAM)	58	José Gutiérrez	José Gutiérrez
45	Angola	Tripartite	—N/a	—N/a	Manuel Lelo
46	Bermuda	Tripartite	—N/a	—N/a	Cameron Pimentel

=== Heavyweight one-person dinghy – Finn ===
#	Nation	Qualification Tournament	Place in Event	Sailor	Sailor at Games
1	Brazil	Host Country	—N/a	—N/a	Jorge Zarif
2	Great Britain	2014 Worlds	1	Giles Scott	Giles Scott
3	Croatia	2014 Worlds	2	Ivan Kljaković Gašpić	Ivan Kljaković Gašpić
4	France	2014 Worlds	4	Jonathan Lobert	Jonathan Lobert
5	New Zealand	2014 Worlds	5	Josh Junior	Josh Junior
6	United States	2014 Worlds	7	Caleb Paine	Caleb Paine
7	Norway	2014 Worlds	8	Anders Pedersen	Anders Pedersen
8	Sweden	2014 Worlds	10	Max Salminen	Max Salminen
9	Denmark	2014 Worlds	11	Jonas Høgh Christensen	Jonas Høgh Christensen
10	Slovenia	2014 Worlds	12	Vasilij Žbogar	Vasilij Žbogar
11	Australia	2014 Worlds	13	Jake Lilley	Jake Lilley
12	Hungary	2014 Worlds	15	Zsombor Berecz	Zsombor Berecz
13	Finland	2014 Worlds	16	Tapio Nirkko	Tapio Nirkko
14	Netherlands	2015 Worlds	6	Pieter-Jan Postma	Pieter-Jan Postma
15	Greece	2015 Worlds	9	Ioannis Mitakis	Ioannis Mitakis
16	Estonia	2015 Worlds	11	Deniss Karpak	Deniss Karpak
17	Uruguay	2015 Worlds	17	Alejandro Foglia	Alejandro Foglia
18	Italy	2015 Worlds	24	Giorgio Poggi	Giorgio Poggi
19	Seychelles	Princess Sofia (Africa)	56	Allan Julie	Allan Julie
20	China	ISAF World Cup (Asia)	1	Gong Lei	Gong Lei
—		ISAF World Cup (Oceania)			
21	Turkey	Princess Sofia (Europe)	18	Alican Kaynar	Alican Kaynar
22	Canada	ISAF World Cup (NAM)	13	Tom Ramshaw	Tom Ramshaw
23	Argentina	ISAF World Cup (SAM)	10	Facundo Olezza	Facundo Olezza

=== Two-person dinghy – 470 ===
#	Nation	Qualification Tournament	Place in Event	Sailor	Sailor at Games
1	Brazil	Host Country	—N/a	—N/a	Bruno Bethlem; Henrique Haddad
2	Australia	2014 Worlds	1	Mathew Belcher; William Ryan	Mathew Belcher; William Ryan
3	Croatia	2014 Worlds	2	Šime Fantela; Igor Marenić	Šime Fantela; Igor Marenić
4	Greece	2014 Worlds	3	Pavlos Kagialis; Panagiotis Mantis	Pavlos Kagialis; Panagiotis Mantis
5	Great Britain	2014 Worlds	4	Luke Patience; Elliot Willis	Luke Patience; Chris Grube
6	United States	2014 Worlds	5	Stuart McNay; David Hughes	Stuart McNay; David Hughes
7	Japan	2014 Worlds	6	Tetsuya Matsunaga; Yugo Yoshida	Kazuto Doi; Kimihiko Imamura
8	Spain	2014 Worlds	7	Jordi Xammar; Joan Herp	Jordi Xammar; Joan Herp
9	France	2014 Worlds	8	Guillaume Pirouelle; Valentin Sipan	Sofian Bouvet; Jérémie Mion
10	Russia	2014 Worlds	10	Pavel Sozykin; Denis Gribanov	Pavel Sozykin; Denis Gribanov
11	New Zealand	2014 Worlds	12	Paul Snow-Hansen; Daniel Willcox	Paul Snow-Hansen; Daniel Willcox
12	Austria	2014 Worlds	13	Florian Reichstädter; Matthias Schmid	Florian Reichstädter; Matthias Schmid
13	Switzerland	2014 Worlds	14	Yannick Brauchli; Romuald Hausser	Yannick Brauchli; Romuald Hausser
14	Sweden	2014 Worlds	15	Anton Dahlberg; Fredrik Bergström	Anton Dahlberg; Fredrik Bergström
15	Finland	2015 Worlds	5	Joonas Lindgren; Niklas Lindgren	Joonas Lindgren; Niklas Lindgren
16	Germany	2015 Worlds	9	Ferdinand Gerz; Oliver Szymanski	Ferdinand Gerz; Oliver Szymanski
17	Argentina	2015 Worlds	18	Lucas Calabrese; Juan de la Fuente	Lucas Calabrese; Juan de la Fuente
18	Turkey	2015 Worlds	19	Deniz Çınar; Ateş Çınar	Deniz Çınar; Ateş Çınar
19	South Africa	2015 Worlds	21	Asenathi Jim; Roger Hudson	Asenathi Jim; Roger Hudson
20	Israel	2015 Worlds	24	Dan Froyliche; Eyal Levin	Dan Froyliche; Eyal Levin
21	South Korea	2015 Worlds	29	Kim Chang-ju; Kim Ji-hoon	Kim Chang-ju; Kim Ji-hoon
22	Angola	Africa Regatta	6	Matias Montinho; Paixão Afonso	Matias Montinho; Paixão Afonso
23	China	ISAF World Cup (Asia)	1	Wang Chao; Lan Hao	Wang Wei; Xu Zangjun
—		ISAF World Cup (Oceania)			
24	Ukraine	Princess Sofia (Europe)	14	Borys Shvets; Pavlo Matsuyev	Borys Shvets; Pavlo Matsuyev
25	Canada	ISAF World Cup (NAM)	7	Jacob Saunders; Graeme Saunders	Jacob Saunders; Graeme Saunders
26	Chile	ISAF World Cup (SAM)	18	Andres Ducasse; Francisco Ducasse	Andres Ducasse; Francisco Ducasse

=== Skiff – 49er ===
#	Nation	Qualification Tournament	Place in Event	Sailor	Sailor at Games
1	Brazil	Host Country	—N/a	—N/a	Gabriel Borges; Marco Grael
2	New Zealand	2014 Worlds	1	Peter Burling; Blair Tuke	Peter Burling; Blair Tuke
3	Denmark	2014 Worlds	2	Jonas Warrer; Anders Thomsen	Jonas Warrer; Christian Peter Lübeck
4	Australia	2014 Worlds	3	Nathan Outteridge; Iain Jensen	Nathan Outteridge; Iain Jensen
5	Austria	2014 Worlds	4	Nico Delle-Karth; Nikolaus Resch	Nico Delle-Karth; Nikolaus Resch
6	Portugal	2014 Worlds	5	Jorge Lima; José Costa	Jorge Lima; José Costa
7	Great Britain	2014 Worlds	6	John Pink; Stuart Bithell	Dylan Fletcher; Alain Sign
8	Ireland	2014 Worlds	8	Ryan Seaton; Matt McGovern	Ryan Seaton; Matt McGovern
9	France	2014 Worlds	9	Emmanuel Dyen; Stéphane Christidis	Noé Delpech; Julien d'Ortoli
10	Spain	2014 Worlds	10	Carlos Paz; Antón Paz Blanco	Diego Botín; Iago López
11	Italy	2014 Worlds	12	Stefano Cherin; Andrea Tesei	Ruggero Tita; Pietro Zucchetti
12	Poland	2015 Worlds	4	Paweł Kołodziński; Łukasz Przybytek	Paweł Kołodziński; Łukasz Przybytek
13	Germany	2015 Worlds	5	Erik Heil; Thomas Plößel	Erik Heil; Thomas Plößel
14	Argentina	2015 Worlds	6	Klaus Lange; Yago Lange	Klaus Lange; Yago Lange
15	Croatia	2015 Worlds	12	Pavle Kostov; Petar Cupać	Pavle Kostov; Petar Cupać
16	Belgium	2015 Worlds	19	Yannick Lefèbvre; Tom Pelsmaekers	Yannick Lefèbvre; Tom Pelsmaekers
—	Canada	2015 Worlds	41	David Mori; Justin Barnes	
17	Switzerland	2015 Worlds	43	Lucien Cujean; Sébastien Schneiter	Lucien Cujean; Sébastien Schneiter
—		Princess Sofia (Africa)			
18	Japan	ASAF Cup (Asia)	1	Yukio Makino; Kenji Takahashi	Yukio Makino; Kenji Takahashi
—		ISAF World Cup (Oceania)			
—	Sweden	Princess Sofia (Europe)	14	Victor Bergström; Niclas During	
19	United States	ISAF World Cup (NAM)	13	Thomas Barrows III; Joseph Morris	Thomas Barrows III; Joseph Morris
20	Chile	ISAF World Cup (SAM)	39	Benjamín Grez; Cristóbal Grez	Benjamín Grez; Cristóbal Grez

== Women's events ==
=== Windsurfer – RS:X ===
#	Nation	Qualification Tournament	Place in Event	Sailor	Sailor at Games
1	Brazil	Host Country	—N/a	—N/a	Patrícia Freitas
2	France	2014 Worlds	1	Charline Picon	Charline Picon
3	Spain	2014 Worlds	2	Marina Alabau	Marina Alabau
4	Israel	2014 Worlds	3	Maayan Davidovich	Maayan Davidovich
5	China	2014 Worlds	4	Wu Jiahui	Chen Peina
6	Great Britain	2014 Worlds	5	Bryony Shaw	Bryony Shaw
7	Italy	2014 Worlds	6	Flavia Tartaglini	Flavia Tartaglini
8	Poland	2014 Worlds	7	Zofia Noceti-Klepacka	Małgorzata Białecka
9	Netherlands	2014 Worlds	10	Lilian de Geus	Lilian de Geus
10	Finland	2014 Worlds	15	Tuuli Petäjä-Sirén	Tuuli Petäjä-Sirén
11	Russia	2014 Worlds	19	Stefania Elfutina	Stefania Elfutina
—	New Zealand	2014 Worlds	21	Natalia Kosinska	
12	Estonia	2014 Worlds	23	Ingrid Puusta	Ingrid Puusta
13	Mexico	2014 Worlds	24	Demita Vega	Demita Vega
14	Hong Kong	2015 Worlds	11	Hei Man Hayley Chan	Sin Lam Sonia Lo
15	Japan	2015 Worlds	21	Megumi Iseda	Megumi Iseda
16	Norway	2015 Worlds	29	Maria Mollestad	Maria Mollestad
—	Australia	2015 Worlds	31	Joanna Sterling	
17	Denmark	2015 Worlds	36	Lærke Buhl-Hansen	Lærke Buhl-Hansen
18	Greece	2015 Worlds	38	Angeliki Skarlatou	Angeliki Skarlatou
19	United States	2015 Worlds	39	Farrah Hall	Marion Lepert
20	Turkey	2015 Worlds	47	Dilara Uralp	Dilara Uralp
—	Sweden	2015 Worlds	48	Fanny Baumann	
—	Germany	2015 Worlds	54	Stefanie Schwarz	
21	Latvia	2015 Worlds	55	Ketija Birzule	Ketija Birzule
22	Singapore	2015 Worlds	56	Nicole Lim	Audrey Yong
23	Algeria	Africa Regatta	1	Katia Belabas	Katia Belabas
24	Thailand	ASAF Cup (Asia)	2	Siripon Kaewduangngam	Siripon Kaewduangngam
—		ISAF World Cup (Oceania)			
25	Hungary	Princess Sofia (Europe)	35	Sára Cholnoky	Sára Cholnoky
—	Canada	ISAF World Cup (NAM)	31	Olivia Mew	
26	Argentina	ISAF World Cup (SAM)	26	María Celia Tejerina	María Celia Tejerina

=== One-person dinghy – Laser Radial ===
#	Nation	Qualification Tournament	Place in Event	Sailor	Sailor at Games
1	Brazil	Host Country	—N/a	—N/a	Fernanda Decnop
2	Netherlands	2014 Worlds	1	Marit Bouwmeester	Marit Bouwmeester
3	Sweden	2014 Worlds	2	Josefin Olsson	Josefin Olsson
4	Belgium	2014 Worlds	3	Evi Van Acker	Evi Van Acker
5	Finland	2014 Worlds	4	Tuula Tenkanen	Tuula Tenkanen
6	Czech Republic	2014 Worlds	5	Veronika Fenclová	Veronika Fenclová
7	Croatia	2014 Worlds	6	Tina Mihelić	Tina Mihelić
8	Denmark	2014 Worlds	7	Anne-Marie Rindom	Anne-Marie Rindom
9	France	2014 Worlds	8	Mathilde de Kerangat	Mathilde de Kerangat
10	Great Britain	2014 Worlds	9	Alison Young	Alison Young
—	New Zealand	2014 Worlds	12	Sara Winther	
11	China	2014 Worlds	13	Zhang Dongshuang	Xu Lijia
12	United States	2014 Worlds	14	Erika Reineke	Paige Railey
13	Italy	2014 Worlds	17	Silvia Zennaro	Silvia Zennaro
14	Canada	2014 Worlds	18	Isabella Bertold	Brenda Bowskill
15	Singapore	2014 Worlds	19	Elizabeth Yue Ling Yin	Elizabeth Yue Ling Yin
16	Ireland	2014 Worlds	20	Annalise Murphy	Annalise Murphy
17	Norway	2014 Worlds	21	Marthe Enger Eide	Tiril Bue
18	Lithuania	2014 Worlds	22	Viktorija Andrulytė	Gintarė Scheidt
19	Belarus	2014 Worlds	23	Tatiana Drozdovskaya	Tatiana Drozdovskaya
20	Japan	2015 Worlds	8	Manami Doi	Manami Doi
21	Australia	2015 Worlds	11	Ashley Stoddart	Ashley Stoddart
22	Turkey	2015 Worlds	13	Nazlı Çağla Dönertaş	Nazlı Çağla Dönertaş
23	Argentina	2015 Worlds	21	Lucía Falasca	Lucía Falasca
24	Spain	2015 Worlds	23	Alicia Cebrián	Alicia Cebrián
25	Tunisia	Africa Regatta	1	Ines Gmati	Ines Gmati
26	Algeria	Africa Regatta	2	Imène Cherif-Sahraoui	Imène Cherif-Sahraoui
27	Thailand	ASAF Cup (Asia)	1	Kamolwan Chanyim	Kamolwan Chanyim
28	Malaysia	ASAF Cup (Asia)	2	Nur Shazrin Mohd Latif	Nur Shazrin Mohd Latif
29	Cook Islands	ISAF World Cup (Oceania)	13	Teau McKenzie	Teau McKenzie
30	Hungary	Princess Sofia (Europe)	8	Mária Érdi	Mária Érdi
31	Portugal	Princess Sofia (Europe)	13	Sara Carmo	Sara Carmo
32	Aruba	2015 Pan Am Games (NAM)	4	Philipine van Aanholt	Philipine van Aanholt
33	Bermuda	ISAF World Cup (NAM)	40	Cecilia Wollmann	Cecilia Wollmann
34	Uruguay	2015 Pan Am Games (SAM)	2	Dolores Moreira	Dolores Moreira
35	Peru	ISAF World Cup (SAM)	36	Paloma Schmidt	Paloma Schmidt
36	Cayman Islands	Tripartite	—N/a	—N/a	Florence Allan
37	Saint Lucia	Tripartite	—N/a	—N/a	Stephanie Devaux-Lovell

=== Two-person dinghy – 470 ===
#	Nation	Qualification Tournament	Place in Event	Sailor	Sailor at Games
1	Brazil	Host Country	—N/a	—N/a	Ana Barbachan; Fernanda Oliveira
2	Austria	2014 Worlds	1	Lara Vadlau; Jolanta Ogar	Lara Vadlau; Jolanta Ogar
3	New Zealand	2014 Worlds	2	Jo Aleh; Polly Powrie	Jo Aleh; Polly Powrie
4	Great Britain	2014 Worlds	3	Hannah Mills; Saskia Clark	Hannah Mills; Saskia Clark
5	France	2014 Worlds	4	Camille Lecointre; Hélène Defrance	Camille Lecointre; Hélène Defrance
6	Slovenia	2014 Worlds	5	Tina Mrak; Veronika Macarol	Tina Mrak; Veronika Macarol
7	Netherlands	2014 Worlds	6	Michelle Broekhuizen; Marieke Jongens	Afrodite Kyranakou; Anneloes van Veen
8	United States	2014 Worlds	7	Annie Haeger; Briana Provancha	Annie Haeger; Briana Provancha
9	Japan	2014 Worlds	8	Ai Kondo; Miho Yoshioka	Ai Kondo; Miho Yoshioka
10	Russia	2014 Worlds	11	Alisa Kirilyuk; Liudmila Dmitrieva	Alisa Kirilyuk; Liudmila Dmitrieva
11	China	2014 Worlds	15	Chen Shasha; Gao Haiyan	Huang Lizhu; Wang Xiaoli
12	Poland	2015 Worlds	6	Agnieszka Skrzypulec; Irmina Gliszczyńska	Agnieszka Skrzypulec; Irmina Gliszczyńska
13	Germany	2015 Worlds	8	Annika Bochmann; Marlene Steinherr	Annika Bochmann; Marlene Steinherr
14	Australia	2015 Worlds	9	Carrie Smith; Jaime Ryan	Carrie Smith; Jaime Ryan
15	Spain	2015 Worlds	10	Marina Gallego; Fatima Reyes	Bàrbara Cornudella; Sara López
16	Switzerland	2015 Worlds	11	Linda Fahrni; Maja Siegenthaler	Linda Fahrni; Maja Siegenthaler
17	Italy	2015 Worlds	20	Roberta Caputo; Alice Sinno	Elena Berta; Alice Sinno
—		Princess Sofia (Africa)			
18	Singapore	ISAF World Cup (Asia)	13	Lee Shu Xian; Priscilla Low	Jovina Choo; Amanda Ng
—		ISAF World Cup (Oceania)			
19	Israel	Princess Sofia (Europe)	9	Nina Amir; Gil Cohen	Nina Amir; Gil Cohen
—	Canada	ISAF World Cup (NAM)	12	Allison Surrette; Alexandra Ten Hove	
20	Chile	ISAF World Cup (SAM)	9	Nadja Horwitz; Sofia Middleton	Nadja Horwitz; Sofia Middleton

=== Skiff – 49erFX ===
#	Nation	Qualification Tournament	Place in Event	Sailor	Sailor at Games
1	Brazil	Host Country	—N/a	—N/a	Martine Grael; Kahena Kunze
2	Denmark	2014 Worlds	2	Ida Marie Baad Nielsen; Marie Thusgaard Olsen	Jena Mai Hansen; Katja Salskov-Iversen
3	Italy	2014 Worlds	3	Giulia Conti; Francesca Clapcich	Giulia Conti; Francesca Clapcich
4	Netherlands	2014 Worlds	4	Annemiek Bekkering; Annette Duetz	Annemiek Bekkering; Annette Duetz
5	Germany	2014 Worlds	5	Victoria Jurczok; Anika Lorenz	Victoria Jurczok; Anika Lorenz
6	Great Britain	2014 Worlds	7	Charlotte Dobson; Sophie Ainsworth	Charlotte Dobson; Sophie Ainsworth
7	Spain	2014 Worlds	8	Támara Echegoyen; Berta Betanzos	Támara Echegoyen; Berta Betanzos
8	Sweden	2014 Worlds	9	Lisa Ericson; Hanna Klinga	Lisa Ericson; Hanna Klinga
—	Australia	2014 Worlds	11	Tess Lloyd; Caitlin Eks	
9	New Zealand	2014 Worlds	12	Alex Maloney; Molly Meech	Alex Maloney; Molly Meech
10	France	2014 Worlds	17	Sarah Steyaert; Julie Bossard	Sarah Steyaert; Aude Compan
11	Argentina	2015 Worlds	11	Victoria Travascio; Maria Sol Branz	Victoria Travascio; Maria Sol Branz
12	Singapore	2015 Worlds	13	Griselda Khng; Sara Tan	Griselda Khng; Sara Tan
13	Canada	2015 Worlds	17	Danielle Boyd; Erin Rafuse	Danielle Boyd; Erin Rafuse
14	Norway	2015 Worlds	18	Ragna Agerup; Maia Agerup	Ragna Agerup; Maia Agerup
15	Ireland	2015 Worlds	19	Andrea Brewster; Saskia Tidey	Andrea Brewster; Saskia Tidey
—	Croatia	2015 Worlds	24	Enia Ninčević; Marina Dujmović	
—	Austria	2015 Worlds	28	Laura Schöfegger; Elsa Lovrek	
16	Estonia	2015 Worlds	35	Kätlin Tammiste; Anna Maria Sepp	Kätlin Tammiste; Anna Maria Sepp
—		Princess Sofia (Africa)			
17	Japan	ASAF Cup (Asia)	1	Keiko Miyagawa; Sena Takano	Keiko Miyagawa; Sena Takano
—		ISAF World Cup (Oceania)			
18	Finland	Princess Sofia (Europe)	9	Camilla Cedercreutz; Noora Ruskola	Camilla Cedercreutz; Noora Ruskola
19	United States	ISAF World Cup (NAM)	17	Paris Henken; Helena Scutt	Paris Henken; Helena Scutt
20	Chile	ISAF World Cup (SAM)	27	Arantza Gumucio; Begoña Gumucio	Arantza Gumucio; Begoña Gumucio

== Mixed events ==
=== Multihull – Nacra 17 ===
#	Nation	Qualification Tournament	Place in Event	Sailor	Sailor at Games
1	Brazil	Host Country	—N/a	—N/a	Samuel Albrecht; Isabel Swan
2	France	2014 Worlds	1	Billy Besson; Marie Riou	Billy Besson; Marie Riou
3	Argentina	2014 Worlds	2	Santiago Lange; Cecilia Carranza Saroli	Santiago Lange; Cecilia Carranza Saroli
4	Australia	2014 Worlds	3	Jason Waterhouse; Lisa Darmanin	Jason Waterhouse; Lisa Darmanin
5	Italy	2014 Worlds	4	Vittorio Bissaro; Silvia Sicouri	Vittorio Bissaro; Silvia Sicouri
6	New Zealand	2014 Worlds	5	Gemma Jones; Jason Saunders	Gemma Jones; Jason Saunders
7	Switzerland	2014 Worlds	6	Matías Bühler; Nathalie Brugger	Matías Bühler; Nathalie Brugger
8	Great Britain	2014 Worlds	7	Lucy MacGregor; Andrew Walsh	Ben Saxton; Nicola Groves
9	Denmark	2014 Worlds	11	Allan Nørregaard; Line Just Emsvang	Allan Nørregaard; Anette Viborg Andreasen
10	Austria	2014 Worlds	14	Thomas Zajac; Tanja Frank	Thomas Zajac; Tanja Frank
11	Netherlands	2014 Worlds	18	Coen de Koning; Mandy Mulder	Coen de Koning; Mandy Mulder
12	Germany	2015 Worlds	5	Paul Kohlhoff; Carolina Werner	Paul Kohlhoff; Carolina Werner
13	Aruba	2015 Worlds	7	Nicole van der Velden; Thijs Visser	Nicole van der Velden; Thijs Visser
14	Spain	2015 Worlds	9	Iker Martínez; Marina López	Fernando Echavarri; Tara Pacheco
15	United States	2015 Worlds	19	Matthew Whitehead; Sarah Newbery	Bora Gulari; Louisa Chafee
16	Tunisia	Princess Sofia (Africa)	41	Hedi Gharbi; Rihab Hammami	Hedi Gharbi; Rihab Hammami
17	Singapore	ISAF World Cup (Asia)	1	Justin Liu; Denise Lim	Justin Liu; Denise Lim
—		ISAF World Cup (Oceania)			
18	Greece	Princess Sofia (Europe)	16	Michail Pateniotis; Sofia Bekatorou	Michail Pateniotis; Sofia Bekatorou
19	Canada	ISAF World Cup (NAM)	15	Luke Ramsay; Nikola Girke	Luke Ramsay; Nikola Girke
20	Uruguay	ISAF World Cup (SAM)	33	Pablo Defazio; Mariana Foglia	Pablo Defazio; Mariana Foglia
