= 2014 ISAF Sailing World Championships – Laser =

Laser at the 2014 ISAF Sailing World Championships
- Venue: Santander, Spain
- Dates: 12–18 September
- Competitors: 147 from 69 nations

Medalists
gold medal	Nicholas Heiner	Netherlands
silver medal	Tom Burton	Australia
bronze medal	Nick Thompson	Great Britain

The men's Laser class at the 2014 ISAF Sailing World Championships was held in Santander, Spain 12–18 September.

== Results ==
Results of individual races
Pos	Helmsman	Country	I	II	III	IV	V	VI	VII	VIII	MR	Tot	Pts
Gold medal	Nicholas Heiner	Netherlands	3	10	1	4	3	12^{†}	12	10	2	57	45
Silver medal	Tom Burton	Australia	5	3	8	2	8	4	16^{†}	7	14	67	51
Bronze medal	Nick Thompson	Great Britain	1	18^{†}	11	7	6	8	3	3	16	73	55
4	Philipp Buhl	Germany	15	2	20	6	38^{†}	1	1	2	12	97	59
5	Robert Scheidt	Brazil	13	2	1	3	BFD 50^{†}	9	20	8	8	114	64
6	Jean-Baptiste Bernaz	France	26^{†}	15	2	9	11	6	13	11	4	97	71
7	Charlie Buckingham	United States	6	23^{†}	2	8	2	19	2	16	18	96	73
8	Rutger van Schaardenburg	Netherlands	14	1	1	RET 50^{†}	21	3	14	17	6	127	77
9	Sam Meech	New Zealand	12	6	2	43^{†}	16	13	19	6	10	127	84
10	Pavlos Kontides	Cyprus	20	12	4	1	25	5	48^{†}	4	DNF 22	141	93
11	Lorenzo Chiavarini	Great Britain	2	14	29^{†}	6	5	18	17	13	–	104	75
12	Bruno Fontes	Brazil	4	7	9	3	34^{†}	14	21	21	–	113	79
13	Jesper Stålheim	Sweden	12	4	5	5	30^{†}	11	18	27	–	112	82
14	Andy Maloney	New Zealand	18	10	19	4	1	16	39^{†}	15	–	122	83
15	Christopher Barnard	United States	7	11	10	2	13	32	11	44^{†}	–	130	86
16	Giovanni Coccoluto	Italy	1	9	36^{†}	13	7	24	9	26	–	125	89
17	Ashley Brunning	Australia	11	30	BFD 50^{†}	1	14	10	15	14	–	145	95
18	Ryan Palk	Australia	5	9	13	1	27	26	46^{†}	22	–	149	103
19	Luke Elliott	Australia	20	3	15	27	26	7	28^{†}	9	–	135	107
20	Thomas Saunders	New Zealand	11	5	22	5	23	15	31	39^{†}	–	151	112
21	Tonči Stipanović	Croatia	6	12	5	27	BFD 50^{†}	34	7	23	–	164	114
22	Tobias Schadewaldt	Germany	3	13	14	12	BFD 50^{†}	17	25	30	–	164	114
23	Francesco Marrai	Italy	25	19	3	13	22	22	33^{†}	12	–	149	116
24	Alessio Spadoni	Italy	12	17	15	10	BFD 50^{†}	2	35	25	–	166	116
25	Martin Evans	Great Britain	16	6	12	16	28	41^{†}	8	32	–	159	118
26	Yuri Hummel	Netherlands	31	10	9	15	9	44^{†}	27	20	–	165	121
27	Emil Cedergårdh	Sweden	24	19	7	5	32	30	4	42^{†}	–	163	121
28	Matthew Wearn	Australia	7	2	10	29	35	38	40^{†}	1	–	162	122
29	Kristian Ruth	Norway	15	1	20	24	20	40	42^{†}	5	–	167	125
30	Michael Bullot	New Zealand	23	11	4	24	4	23	38^{†}	36	–	163	125
31	Erik Bowers	United States	18	3	16	8	DNF 50^{†}	37	5	41	–	178	128
32	Colin Cheng	Singapore	2	20	11	17	19	25	34	46^{†}	–	174	128
33	Juan Ignacio Maegli	Guatemala	3	1	BFD 50^{†}	14	DNF 50	43	10	18	–	189	139
34	Eliot Merceron	France	1	25	7	30	24	45^{†}	29	24	–	185	140
35	Antony Munos	France	9	16	17	34	12	42^{†}	22	31	–	183	141
36	Youssef Akrout	Tunisia	5	17	11	26	15	36	44^{†}	33	–	187	143
37	James Espey	Ireland	6	16	33	15	10	28	36	45^{†}	–	189	144
38	Cy Thompson	U.S. Virgin Islands	32	26	3	10	17	20	41^{†}	37	–	186	145
39	Elliot Hanson	Great Britain	14	30	8	4	18	46^{†}	37	35	–	192	146
40	Rui Silveira	Portugal	4	21	19	3	37	39	23	43^{†}	–	189	146
41	Gustavo Lima	Portugal	18	29	3	12	BFD 50^{†}	27	30	28	–	197	147
42	Wannes Van Laer	Belgium	RDG 18	RDG 18	21	6	29	29	45^{†}	29	–	195	150
43	Lee Parkhill	Canada	8	7	6	22	31	48^{†}	32	47	–	201	153
44	Fabian Gielen	Germany	19	6	35	13	BFD 50^{†}	35	6	40	–	204	154
45	Kaarle Tapper	Finland	DSQ 50^{†}	9	6	17	33	31	43	19	–	208	158
46	Filip Jurišić	Croatia	8	15	42	2	BFD 50^{†}	21	47	38	–	223	173
47	Thorbjørn Schierup	Denmark	10	35	15	7	BFD 50^{†}	47	26	34	–	224	174
48	Theodor Bauer	Germany	10	8	18	41	36	49^{†}	24	48	–	234	185
49	Jonasz Stelmaszyk	Poland	31	4	25	11	BFD 50^{†}	33	DNF 50	DNF 50	–	254	204
50	Mitchell Kennedy	Australia	21^{†}	8	17	18	4	–	–	–	–	68	47
51	Juan Pablo Bisio	Argentina	37^{†}	21	16	8	6	–	–	–	–	88	51
52	Robert Davis	Canada	2	22^{†}	22	19	10	–	–	–	–	75	53
53	Sergey Komissarov	Russia	9	31^{†}	14	27	8	–	–	–	–	89	58
54	Guillaume Girod	Switzerland	16	23	38^{†}	18	2	–	–	–	–	97	59
55	Karl-Martin Rammo	Estonia	22	14	9	23^{†}	14	–	–	–	–	82	59
56	Mattis Naud	France	9	35^{†}	24	28	1	–	–	–	–	97	62
57	Jeremy O'Connell	Australia	43^{†}	5	17	31	9	–	–	–	–	105	62
58	Stefano Peschiera	Peru	23	26	8	28^{†}	7	–	–	–	–	92	64
59	Alexandr Denisiuc	Moldova	36^{†}	16	12	25	12	–	–	–	–	101	65
60	Adonis Bougiouris	Greece	22	20	14	10	33^{†}	–	–	–	–	99	66
61	Kacper Ziemiński	Poland	33^{†}	27	20	9	11	–	–	–	–	100	67
62	Daniel Mihelić	Croatia	30^{†}	13	16	21	17	–	–	–	–	97	67
63	Alex Mills-Barton	Great Britain	39	UFD 50^{†}	4	7	18	–	–	–	–	118	68
64	Joaquín Blanco	Spain	38^{†}	4	23	21	21	–	–	–	–	107	69
65	Huichao Chen	China	21	19	18	11	40^{†}	–	–	–	–	109	69
66	Evert McLaughlin	Canada	7	32^{†}	27	22	15	–	–	–	–	103	71
67	Viktor Teplý	Czech Republic	35	8	13	40^{†}	16	–	–	–	–	112	72
68	Scott Sydney	Singapore	16	20	7	31	39^{†}	–	–	–	–	113	74
69	Alex Veeren	Brazil	28	11	36^{†}	14	22	–	–	–	–	111	75
70	Sam Vandormael	Belgium	8	23	19	28^{†}	25	–	–	–	–	103	75
71	Christian Guldberg Rost	Denmark	13	36	43^{†}	22	5	–	–	–	–	119	76
72	Mathias Mollatt	Norway	28	5	BFD 50^{†}	33	13	–	–	–	–	129	79
73	Benjámin Vadnai	Hungary	29^{†}	24	5	24	26	–	–	–	–	108	79
74	Anders Karlsson	Sweden	20	22	35	42^{†}	3	–	–	–	–	122	80
75	Valeriy Kudryashov	Ukraine	27^{†}	15	24	25	19	–	–	–	–	110	83
76	Ramón González Bennazar	Puerto Rico	24	17	24	35^{†}	20	–	–	–	–	120	85
77	Andrew Lewis	Trinidad and Tobago	30	34	6	18	37^{†}	–	–	–	–	125	88
78	Kaarel Kruusmägi	Estonia	13	26	26	45^{†}	24	–	–	–	–	134	89
79	Matias Mikkola	Finland	29^{†}	25	23	19	23	–	–	–	–	119	90
80	Nik Pletikos	Slovenia	34^{†}	28	25	11	27	–	–	–	–	125	91
81	Julio Alsogaray	Argentina	21	UFD 50^{†}	32	12	30	–	–	–	–	145	95
82	Jesus Rogel Sanchez	Spain	17	27	34	17	DNF 50^{†}	–	–	–	–	145	95
83	Jian Qiao	China	14	13	37	39^{†}	32	–	–	–	–	135	96
84	Tomas Pellejero	Argentina	24	18	27	35^{†}	28	–	–	–	–	132	97
85	José Gutiérrez	Venezuela	25	31	22	20	38^{†}	–	–	–	–	136	98
86	Tom Ramshaw	Canada	11	22	23	42^{†}	42	–	–	–	–	140	98
87	Balázs Tomai	Hungary	10	32^{†}	28	31	31	–	–	–	–	132	100
88	Güney Can Kaptan	Turkey	4	31	47^{†}	20	46	–	–	–	–	148	101
89	Milivoj Dukić	Montenegro	34	25	18	DSQ 50^{†}	29	–	–	–	–	156	106
90	Shi Jian	China	32	7	42^{†}	34	35	–	–	–	–	150	108
91	Ander Belausteguigoitia	Mexico	36	29	29	16	45^{†}	–	–	–	–	155	110
92	Dany Stanišić	Serbia	32	39^{†}	10	36	34	–	–	–	–	151	112
93	Michael Hansen	Denmark	23	36^{†}	28	26	36	–	–	–	–	149	113
94	Luke Muller	United States	37	36	31	9	DNF 50^{†}	–	–	–	–	163	113
95	Ahmed Ragab	Egypt	29	37	33	16	DNF 50^{†}	–	–	–	–	165	115
96	Stefano Raffaele Marcia	South Africa	15	43	46^{†}	15	43	–	–	–	–	162	116
97	Juan Carlos Perdomo	Puerto Rico	19	39	21	38	41^{†}	–	–	–	–	158	117
98	Štěpán Novotný	Czech Republic	17	28	32	46^{†}	44	–	–	–	–	167	121
99	Matías del Solar	Chile	33^{†}	33	32	14	–	–	–	–	–	112	79
100	Luka Tosic	Serbia	38^{†}	24	31	25	–	–	–	–	–	118	80
101	Finn Lynch	Ireland	26	42^{†}	26	29	–	–	–	–	–	123	81
102	Igor Les	Montenegro	31^{†}	28	27	26	–	–	–	–	–	112	81
103	Mustafa Çakir	Turkey	33	14	35	38^{†}	–	–	–	–	–	120	82
104	Aleksander Arian	Poland	41^{†}	24	25	33	–	–	–	–	–	123	82
105	Enrique Arathoon	El Salvador	27	44^{†}	12	44	–	–	–	–	–	127	83
106	Mattias Lindfors	Finland	25	40^{†}	39	19	–	–	–	–	–	123	83
107	Shinnosuke Yasuda	Japan	27	34	BFD 50^{†}	23	–	–	–	–	–	134	84
108	Just van Aanholt	Aruba	42	32	13	43^{†}	–	–	–	–	–	130	87
109	Federico Yandian	Uruguay	19	38	DNF 50^{†}	30	–	–	–	–	–	137	87
110	Khairulnizam Afendy	Malaysia	43^{†}	41	21	29	–	–	–	–	–	134	91
111	Guillermo Flaquer	Dominican Republic	22	38	BFD 50^{†}	32	–	–	–	–	–	142	92
112	Vladymyr Volodymyrov	Ukraine	45^{†}	42	30	21	–	–	–	–	–	138	93
113	Uros Krasevac	Slovenia	46^{†}	27	26	41	–	–	–	–	–	140	94
114	Kenji Nanri	Japan	17	39^{†}	39	39	–	–	–	–	–	134	95
115	Masaaki Taniguchi	Japan	40	12	45^{†}	44	–	–	–	–	–	141	96
116	Benoît Lagneux	Switzerland	35	21	40^{†}	40	–	–	–	–	–	136	96
117	Cameron Pimentel	Bermuda	39^{†}	29	34	35	–	–	–	–	–	137	98
118	Lander Balcaen	Belgium	39^{†}	30	31	37	–	–	–	–	–	137	98
119	Rubin Cruz Jr.	Philippines	26	45^{†}	41	32	–	–	–	–	–	144	99
120	Andrey Quintero	Colombia	42^{†}	33	36	30	–	–	–	–	–	141	99
121	Maksim Nikolayev	Russia	41^{†}	33	30	37	–	–	–	–	–	141	100
122	Karolis Janulionis	Lithuania	34	37	30	38^{†}	–	–	–	–	–	139	101
123	Eduardo Marques	Portugal	42	18	RET 50^{†}	44	–	–	–	–	–	154	104
124	Rodney Govinden	Seychelles	43^{†}	43	41	20	–	–	–	–	–	147	104
125	Marco Gallo	Italy	36	41^{†}	28	40	–	–	–	–	–	145	104
126	Matej Valic	Slovenia	46^{†}	37	37	32	–	–	–	–	–	152	106
127	Albin Gipperth	Sweden	44	40	BFD 50^{†}	23	–	–	–	–	–	157	107
128	Onur Bilgen	Turkey	47^{†}	34	37	36	–	–	–	–	–	154	107
129	Shahar Jacob	Israel	47^{†}	45	29	34	–	–	–	–	–	155	108
130	Toma Višić	Croatia	28	46^{†}	44	37	–	–	–	–	–	155	109
131	Martis Pajarskas	Lithuania	35	41	34	42^{†}	–	–	–	–	–	152	110
132	Joel Rodriguez	Spain	37	42^{†}	39	36	–	–	–	–	–	154	112
133	Hussain Al Jabri	Oman	30	46^{†}	38	45	–	–	–	–	–	159	113
134	Mathieu de By	Netherlands	41	DSQ 50^{†}	33	39	–	–	–	–	–	163	113
135	Matias Dyck	Ecuador	45^{†}	38	43	33	–	–	–	–	–	159	114
136	Matthias Van de Loock	Belgium	45	35	38	46^{†}	–	–	–	–	–	164	118
137	Abdulla Janahi	Brunei	40	43	40	48^{†}	–	–	–	–	–	171	123
138	Cherkit Meziane	Algeria	44	40	40	48^{†}	–	–	–	–	–	172	124
139	Claus Maria Dapeci	Austria	47^{†}	44	43	43	–	–	–	–	–	177	130
140	Enrico Strazzera	Italy	38	44	DNF 50^{†}	49	–	–	–	–	–	181	131
141	Ahmed Alhasani	Oman	40	47^{†}	45	47	–	–	–	–	–	179	132
142	Manuel Lelo	Angola	44	47^{†}	42	47	–	–	–	–	–	180	133
143	Thomas Czajka	Austria	48^{†}	45	48	41	–	–	–	–	–	182	134
144	Markson Charlie	Papua New Guinea	48^{†}	47	41	47	–	–	–	–	–	183	135
145	Ričards Toms Zvilna	Latvia	48^{†}	46	44	45	–	–	–	–	–	183	135
146	Teddy Mwambodze Ndaro	Kenya	46	48^{†}	44	48	–	–	–	–	–	186	138
147	Björn Heiðar Rúnarsson	Iceland	49^{†}	49	49	46	–	–	–	–	–	193	144

Scoring system: low-point system; Source:
Legend: – Qualified for medal race(s); DNC – Did not come to the starting area; DNF – Did not finish; DNS – Did not start; DSQ – Disqualified; RET – Retired; UFD – "U" flag disqualification; † – Discarded race not counted in the overall result;
