= Sailing at the 2016 Summer Olympics – Laser =

Men's Laser at the Games of the XXXI Olympiad
- Line drawing of the Laser
- Venue: Marina da Glória
- Dates: 8–16 August 2016
- Competitors: 46 from 46 nations
- Winning total: 73.0 points

Medalists
1st place, gold medalist(s)		Tom Burton	Australia
2nd place, silver medalist(s)		Tonči Stipanović	Croatia
3rd place, bronze medalist(s)		Sam Meech	New Zealand

The men's Laser competition at the 2016 Summer Olympics in Rio de Janeiro took place between 8–16 August at Marina da Glória. Eleven races (the last one a medal race) were held.

== Schedule ==
Mon 8 Aug	Tue 9 Aug	Wed 10 Aug	Thu 11 Aug	Fri 12 Aug	Sat 13 Aug	Sun 14 Aug	Mon 15 Aug	Tue 16 Aug
Race 1 Race 2	Race 3 Race 4	Race 5 Race 6	Rest day	Race 7 Race 8	Race 9 Race 10	Rest day	Postponement	Medal race

== Results ==
Results of individual races
Pos	Helmsman	Country	I	II	III	IV	V	VI	VII	VIII	IX	X	MR	Tot	Pts
Gold medal	Tom Burton	Australia	17^{†}	8	2	10	9	14	7	2	11	4	6	90.0	73.0
Silver medal	Tonči Stipanović	Croatia	1	5	7	12	6	7	28^{†}	9	7	3	18	103.0	75.0
Bronze medal	Sam Meech	New Zealand	19^{†}	3	5	6	14	17	13	6	12	1	8	104.0	85.0
4	Robert Scheidt	Brazil	23	1	27^{†}	4	11	2	4	5	26	11	2	116.0	89.0
5	Jean-Baptiste Bernaz	France	11	10	4	17	5	UFD 47^{†}	3	15	19	2	4	133.0	90.0
6	Nick Thompson	Great Britain	8	17	9	15	2	1	24^{†}	7	6	22	16	127.0	103.0
7	Pavlos Kontides	Cyprus	7	31^{†}	1	14	25	6	8	14	9	8	12	135.0	104.0
8	Juan Ignacio Maegli	Guatemala	18	14	3	7	16	25^{†}	18	17	3	7	14	144.0	117.0
9	Rutger van Schaardenburg	Netherlands	3	21	24^{†}	8	1	4	22	4	21	24	10	142.0	118.0
10	Julio Alsogaray	Argentina	4	2	14	1	24	UFD 47^{†}	12	16	14	20	OCS 22	176.0	129.0
11	Charlie Buckingham	United States	20	7	10	22	8	26^{†}	15	10	10	6		134.0	108.0
12	Francesco Marrai	Italy	39^{†}	11	18	5	22	11	5	1	13	23		148.0	109.0
13	Ha Jee-min	South Korea	26	6	38^{†}	3	12	9	10	21	8	14		147.0	109.0
14	Philipp Buhl	Germany	16	16	8	13	17	13	1	25	34^{†}	17		160.0	126.0
15	Sergey Komissarov	Russia	2	9	19	23	7	10	16	31^{†}	28	15		160.0	129.0
16	Jesper Stålheim	Sweden	10	23	26	28	10	15	2	3	20	31^{†}		168.0	137.0
17	Wannes Van Laer	Belgium	27	30^{†}	12	11	23	12	23	13	1	18		170.0	140.0
18	Kacper Ziemiński	Poland	34	28	6	DSQ 47^{†}	3	5	20	12	22	10		187.0	140.0
19	Cy Thompson	Virgin Islands	13	4	11	35^{†}	32	33	6	20	17	16		187.0	152.0
20	Colin Cheng	Singapore	5	20	13	18	21	UFD 47^{†}	27	22	25	9		207.0	160.0
21	Karl-Martin Rammo	Estonia	24	19	17	44^{†}	30	28	36	8	2	5		213.0	169.0
22	Gustavo Lima	Portugal	15	15	20	25	15	8	11	28	38^{†}	33		208.0	170.0
23	Lee Parkhill	Canada	43^{†}	37	33	9	19	20	14	23	4	13		215.0	172.0
24	Enrique Arathoon	El Salvador	33^{†}	32	28	30	4	3	9	32	18	21		210.0	177.0
25	Michael Hansen	Denmark	6	24	23	20	31^{†}	31	19	26	5	26		211.0	180.0
26	Kaarle Tapper	Finland	32^{†}	12	31	29	27	18	17	11	23	19		219.0	187.0
27	Kristian Ruth	Norway	UFD 47^{†}	13	32	2	29	16	25	BFD 47	15	30		256.0	209.0
28	Viktor Teplý	Czech Republic	29	18	30	19	13	23	29	29	32	34^{†}		256.0	222.0
29	Milivoj Dukić	Montenegro	12	26	35^{†}	24	33	19	32	34	33	29		267.0	232.0
30	Matías del Solar	Chile	22	35^{†}	22	32	35	24	34	33	24	12		273.0	238.0
31	Stefano Peschiera	Peru	37	40	16	16	28	22	21	27	35	DNF 47^{†}		289.0	242.0
32	Finn Lynch	Ireland	14	27	15	39	18	27	33	30	40	BFD 47^{†}		290.0	243.0
33	Benjámin Vadnai	Hungary	9	44	21	21	DSQ 47^{†}	30	30	39	29	25		295.0	248.0
34	Youssef Akrout	Tunisia	21	29	34	26	38^{†}	32	37	35	16	27		295.0	257.0
35	Khairulnizam Afendy	Malaysia	38	33	40	33	20	21	RET 47^{†}	37	31	28		328.0	281.0
36	Joaquin Blanco	Spain	28	DNF 47^{†}	25	40	26	29	26	DNE 47	30	35		333.0	286.0
37	Keerati Bualong	Thailand	25	38	37	31	37	39	35	18	27	BFD 47^{†}		334.0	287.0
38	José Gutierrez	Venezuela	35	36	36	42^{†}	39	35	40	19	37	37		356.0	314.0
39	Andrew Lewis	Trinidad and Tobago	42	34	39	36	40	34	31	BFD 47^{†}	36	32		371.0	324.0
40	Stefano Marcia	South Africa	30	25	42	38	43	38	44^{†}	36	39	40		375.0	331.0
41	Cameron Pimentel	Bermuda	31	45^{†}	41	27	44	42	39	34	42	39		384.0	339.0
42	Yanic Gentry	Mexico	41	42	29	43	34	36	38	DNF 47^{†}	41	36		387.0	340.0
43	Ahmed Ragab	Egypt	36	22	44	41	41	41	42	40	45^{†}	42		394.0	349.0
44	Taua Henry	Cook Islands	40	39	43	34	36	40	45	BFD 47^{†}	44	41		409.0	362.0
45	Rodney Govinden	Seychelles	45	41	DNF 47^{†}	37	42	37	41	41	43	38		412.0	365.0
46	Manuel Lelo	Angola	44	43	45	45	DNF 47^{†}	43	43	38	46	43		437.0	390.0

Scoring system: low-point system;
Legend: – Qualified for medal race(s); BFD – Black flag disqualification; DNE – Non excludable disqualification; DNF – Did not finish; DSQ – Disqualified; OCS – On the course side of the starting line; RET – Retired; UFD – "U" flag disqualification; † – Discarded race not counted in the overall result;
