= Sailing at the 2015 Pan American Games – Laser =

Men's Laser at the 2015 Pan American Games
- Venue: Royal Canadian Yacht Club
- Dates: July 12 - July 18
- Competitors: 16 from 16 nations

Medalists
Gold medal	Juan Ignacio Maegli	Guatemala
Silver medal	Robert Scheidt	Brazil
Bronze medal	Lee Parkhill	Canada

The men's laser competition of the sailing events at the 2015 Pan American Games in Toronto was held from July 12 to July 18 at the Royal Canadian Yacht Club. The last champion was Julio Alsogaray of Argentina.

Points were assigned based on the finishing position in each race (1 for first, 2 for second, etc.). The points were totaled from the top 11 results of the first 12 races, with lower totals being better. If a sailor was disqualified or did not complete the race, 17 points were assigned for that race (as there were 16 sailors in this competition). The top 8 sailors at that point competed in the final race, with placings counting double for final score. The sailor with the lowest total score won.

== Schedule ==
All times are Eastern Daylight Time (UTC-4).

Date	Time	Round
July 12, 2015	11:35	Race 1
July 13, 2015	11:35	Races 2 and 3
July 14, 2015	11:35	Race 4
July 15, 2015	10:35	Races 5, 6 and 7
July 16, 2015	11:35	Races 8, 9 and 10
July 17, 2015	11:35	Races 11 and 12
July 18, 2015	12:35	Medal race

== Results ==
Race M is the medal race. Each boat can drop its lowest result provided that all twelve races are completed. If less than ten races are completed all races will count. Boats cannot drop their result in the medal race.

Rank	Athlete	Nation	Race													Total Points	Net Points
Rank	Athlete	Nation	1	2	3	4	5	6	7	8	9	10	11	12	M	Total Points	Net Points
1st place, gold medalist(s)	Juan Ignacio Maegli	Guatemala	(17); DNF	2	4	2	2	2	1	5	3	5	2	5	6	56	39
2nd place, silver medalist(s)	Robert Scheidt	Brazil	7	(17); DSQ	7	3	3	1	5	2	4	1	3	1	10	64	47
3rd place, bronze medalist(s)	Lee Parkhill	Canada	6	1	1	17 (OCS)	1	3	2	8	5	8	4	2	12	70	53
4	Charlie Buckingham	United States	1	(17); BFD	2	1	6	14	4	1	2	2	6	4	14	74	57
5	Cy Thompson	Virgin Islands	5	3	5	12	4	6	3	9	1	3	7	(17); UFD	8	83	66
6	Julio Alsogaray	Argentina	3	(17); BFD	3	7	5	13	6	6	8	10	1	6	2	87	70
7	Andrew Lewis	Trinidad and Tobago	(10)	4	6	6	8	7	7	7	9	7	10	3	16	100	90
8	Stefano Peschiera	Peru	11	(17); BFD	8	17; DNF	9	5	9	3	10	4	8	9	4	114	97
9	Juan Carlos Perdomo	Puerto Rico	2	6	11	10	14	8	8	10	7	(15)	14	8		113	98
10	Matías del Solar	Chile	4	(17); OCS	17; DSQ	5	17; RET	15	11	4	6	6	5	14		121	104
11	Enrique Arathoon	El Salvador	8	5	9	(13)	7	9	13	12	11	9	11	11		118	105
12	José Gutiérrez	Venezuela	9	7	10	8	11	10	12	13	12	11	(16)	12		131	115
13	Andrey Quintero	Colombia	14	9	15	9	13	4	10	14	15	(16)	15	10		144	128
14	Cameron Pimentel	Bermuda	(15)	10	13	11	12	11	14	15	13	13	12	7		146	131
15	Federico Yandian	Uruguay	12	(17); DSQ	12	4	17; RET	12	17; DNE	11	14	14	9	13		152	135
16	Yanic Gentry	Mexico	13	8	14	(17); RET	10	16	15	17; DNF	17; DNE	12	13	15		167	150
