= 2016 Asian Sailing Championship =

Event title
- Edition: 16th

Event details
- Venue: Abu Dhabi, United Arab Emirates
- Dates: 5–12 March
- Titles: 6

The 2016 Asian Sailing Championship was held in Abu Dhabi, United Arab Emirates 5–12 March and served as a qualification event for the 2016 Summer Olympics in six events.

== Summary ==
=== Medal table ===
Rank	Nation	Gold	Silver	Bronze	Total
1	Japan (JPN)	2	1	1	4
2	Malaysia (MAS)	1	2	1	4
3	South Korea (KOR)	1	1	2	4
4	Thailand (THA)	1	1	1	3
5	Hong Kong (HKG)	1	1	0	2
6	Oman (OMA)	0	0	1	1
Totals (6 entries)		6	6	6	18

=== Event medalists ===
Event	Gold	Silver	Bronze
49er	Japan; Yukio Makino; Kenji Takahashi	South Korea; Chae Bongjin; Dongwook Kim	Oman; Musab Al Hadi; Hashim Al Rashdi
49er FX	Japan; Keiko Miyagawa; Sena Takano	Japan; Saki Matsunae; Sayoko Harada	Japan; Chika Hatae; Hlroka Itakura
Laser	Khairulnizam Afendy (MAS)	Keerati Bualong (THA)	Ahmad Latif Kahn Ali Sabri Khan (MAS)
Laser Radial	Kamolwan Chanyim (THA)	Nur Shazrin Mohamad Latif (MAS)	Jia Kim (KOR)
Men's RS:X	Cho Won-woo (KOR)	Michael Cheng (HKG)	Natthaphong Phonoppharat (THA)
Women's RS:X	Sin Lam Lo (HKG)	Siripon Kaewduang-ngam (THA)	Sabin Chun (KOR)
