= Sailing at the 2016 Summer Olympics – Women's RS:X =

Women's RS:X at the Games of the XXXI Olympiad
- Line drawing of the RS-X
- Venue: Marina da Glória
- Dates: 8–14 August 2016
- Competitors: 26 from 26 nations
- Winning total: 64 points

Medalists
1st place, gold medalist(s)		Charline Picon	France
2nd place, silver medalist(s)		Chen Peina	China
3rd place, bronze medalist(s)		Stefania Elfutina	Russia

The women's RS:X competition at the 2016 Summer Olympics in Rio de Janeiro took place between 8–14 August at Marina da Glória. Thirteen races (the last one a medal race) were scheduled and completed.

The medals were presented by Barbara Kendall, IOC member, New Zealand and Nazli Imre, Vice President of World Sailing.

== Schedule ==
Mon 8 Aug	Tue 9 Aug	Wed 10 Aug	Thu 11 Aug	Fri 12 Aug	Sat 13 Aug	Sun 14 Aug
Race 1 Race 2 Race 3	Race 4 Race 5 Race 6	Rest day	Race 7 Race 8 Race 9	Race 10; Race 11; Race 12	Rest day	Medal race

== Results ==
Results of individual races
Pos	Helmsman	Country	I	II	III	IV	V	VI	VII	VIII	IX	X	XI	XII	MR	Tot	Pts
Gold medal	Charline Picon	France	1	2	1	4	5	10	5	11	8	UFD 27^{†}	3	10	4	91.0	64.0
Silver medal	Chen Peina	China	9	11	11	15^{†}	7	1	4	10	4	1	1	1	6	81.0	66.0
Bronze medal	Stefania Elfutina	Russia	2	5	3	6	2	9	8	4	6	3	16^{†}	7	14	85.0	69.0
4	Lilian de Geus	Netherlands	3	4	14	3	3	7	15	19^{†}	5	2	7	5	2	89.0	70.0
5	Marina Alabau	Spain	8	7	2	8	6	8	7	2	1	DSQ 27	9	3	10	98.0	71.0
6	Flavia Tartaglini	Italy	12^{†}	1	5	1	1	4	1	12	10	9	5	6	16	83.0	71.0
7	Maayan Davidovich	Israel	5	6	6	11	4	3	2	15^{†}	14	5	2	2	18	93.0	78.0
8	Patrícia Freitas	Brazil	6	8	4	2	13	16^{†}	10	1	3	8	8	9	8	96.0	80.0
9	Bryony Shaw	Great Britain	7	20^{†}	9	7	14	12	3	5	2	4	4	4	12	103.0	83.0
10	Tuuli Petäjä-Sirén	Finland	4	9	8	5	9	5	DNF 27^{†}	3	12	10	6	8	20	126.0	99.0
11	Ingrid Puusta	Estonia	18^{†}	13	12	10	8	11	9	18	7	16	14	14		150.0	132.0
12	Maria Mollestad	Norway	14	10	20^{†}	14	18	20	14	6	11	6	17	11		161.0	141.0
13	Demita Vega	Mexico	11	18	18	9	10	17	DNF 27^{†}	8	13	17	11	15		174.0	147.0
14	Malgorzata Bialecka	Poland	13	21	13	23	12	6	DNF 27^{†}	14	9	11	13	18		180.0	153.0
15	Lærke Buhl-Hansen	Denmark	17	16	17	20	16	13	12	9	21^{†}	12	10	12		175.0	154.0
16	Marion Lepert	United States	10	3	10	13	RDG 12.9	23	23	6	15	UFD 27^{†}	19	22		183.9	156.9
17	Sin Lam Sonia Lo	Hong Kong	15	15	15	16	19	22^{†}	11	17	17	7	12	13		179.0	157.0
18	Siripon Kaewduangngam	Thailand	19	23	22	18	11	2	DNF 27^{†}	7	18	14	15	17		193.0	166.0
19	Angeliki Skarlatou	Greece	16	17	7	12	17	15	DNF 27^{†}	20	16	15	20	16		198.0	171.0
20	Megumi Iseda	Japan	23	22	19	22	15	14	DNF 27^{†}	13	19	13	18	20		225.0	198.0
21	María Celia Tejerina	Argentina	21	12	16	17	21	19	16	16	24	DNF 27^{†}	23	21		233.0	206.0
22	Dilara Uralp	Turkey	20	19	23	24	20	21	DNF 27^{†}	21	20	19	24	19		257.0	230.0
23	Sára Cholnoky	Hungary	22	14	21	19	24	24	13	22	25	DNF 27^{†}	25	DNF 27		262.0	235.0
24	Ketija Birzule	Latvia	24	24	DNF 27^{†}	21	25	26	DNF 27	25	23	18	21	23		283.0	256
25	Audrey Yong	Singapore	25	25	24	25	23	18	DNF 27^{†}	24	22	DNC 27	DNC 27	DNC 27		293.0	266.0
26	Katia Belabas	Algeria	DNF 27^{†}	DNF 27	DNF 27	DNF 27	DNF 27	25	DNF 27	DNF 27	DNF 27	DNF 27	22	DNF 27		317.0	290.0

Scoring system: low-point system;
Legend: – Qualified for medal race(s); DNC – Did not come to the starting area; DNF – Did not finish; DSQ – Disqualified; RDG – Redress given; UFD – "U" flag disqualification; † – Discarded race not counted in the overall result;
