= Akrout =

Akrout is a surname. Notable people with the surname include:

- Edward Akrout (born 1982), British-French artist and actor
- Youssef Akrout (born 1990), Tunisian sailor
