= Steinherr =

Steinherr (German pronunciation: ['ʃtaɪnhɛʁ]) is a German surname meaning stone lord. Notable people with the surname include:

- Marlene Steinherr (born 1985), German sailor
- Thomas Steinherr (born 1993), German footballer
