= Sailing World Championships =

Olympic qualification event

- First held: 2003
- Classes: 470, 49er, 49er FX, Finn, Laser, Laser Radial, Nacra 17, RS:X
- Website: Sailing.org

The Sailing World Championships (formerly ISAF Sailing World Championships) are World championships in sailing for the 10 events contested at the Summer Olympics, organized by World Sailing (formerly ISAF) and held every four years since 2003. In contrast to other years, when each class organise their World championship under supervision of World Sailing, they are the combined World championships for all the disciplines of the next Summer Olympics and serves as the major qualification event for it.

== History ==
In 1998, the ISAF World Sailing Championships were held in Dubai. The ISAF Sailing World Championships was held in Cádiz in 2003, followed by Cascais in 2007 and Perth in 2011.

In 2014, Santander hosted the 4th ISAF Sailing World Championships attracting more than 1,100 competitors, which distributed half of qualifications for the 2016 Summer Olympics sailing event.

The 2018 edition, in Aarhus, Denmark, saw the introduction of Formula Kite classes. The 2023 event, originally scheduled for 2020, took place in The Hague, the Netherlands. The 2023 edition saw the introduction of para classes.

For the edition before the 2028 Summer Olympics, World Sailing decided to split the event into one championship for one-person events and one for two-person events, with the 2026 event awarded to Valencia, Spain, and the 2027 event awarded to Gdynia, Poland.

== Editions ==
Host cities of the Sailing World Championships

Year	City	Country	Dates	Events	Athletes	Nations	Notes
2003	Cádiz	Spain	11–24 September	11	1,450	71	
2007	Cascais	Portugal	28 June – 13 July	11	1,350	76	
2011	Perth	Australia	3–18 December	10	789	76	
2014	Santander	Spain	8–21 September	10	1,250	83	
2018	Aarhus	Denmark	30 July – 12 August	12	1,500	100	
2023	The Hague	Netherlands	10–20 August	14	1,100	80	
2027	Fortaleza; Gdynia	Brazil; Poland	22–30 January; TBA				

European hosts of the Sailing World Championships

== Equipment ==
Event	Class	Gender	Year					
			03	07	11	14	18	23
One-person dinghies	Europe	W	●					
One-person dinghies	Finn	M	●		●	●	●	
One-person dinghies	Finn	O		●				
One-person dinghies	Laser	M		●	●	●	●	●
One-person dinghies	Laser	O	●					
One-person dinghies	Laser Radial	W		●	●	●	●	●
Two-person dinghies	470	M	●	●	●	●	●	
Two-person dinghies	470	W	●	●	●	●	●	
Two-person dinghies	470	Mx						●
Two-person dinghies	49er	M			●	●	●	●
Two-person dinghies	49er	O	●	●				
Two-person dinghies	49er FX	W				●	●	●
Keelboats	Star	M	●	●	●			
Keelboats	Yngling	W	●	●				
Multihulls	Nacra 17	Mx				●	●	●
Multihulls	Tornado	O	●	●				
Boards	Formula Kite	M					Demo	●
Boards	Formula Kite	W					Demo	●
Boards	Mistral	M	●					
Boards	Mistral	W	●					
Boards	RS:X	M		●	●	●	●	
Boards	RS:X	W		●	●	●	●	
Boards	iQFoil	M						●
Boards	iQFoil	W						●
Match racing	Elliott 6m	W			●			
Disabled	Norlin Mk3	O						●
Disabled	Hansa 303	M						●
Disabled	Hansa 303	W						●
Disabled	RS Connect	O						●
Total			11	11	10	10	12	10

Legend: M – Men; W – Women; Mx – Mixed; O – Open;

== All-time medal table ==
As of 19th May 2024

Rank	Nation	Gold	Silver	Bronze	Total
1	Netherlands	10	7	2	19
2	France	8	5	7	20
3	Australia	8	4	7	19
4	Great Britain	6	8	14	28
5	United States	4	1	3	8
6	Brazil	4	1	0	5
7	Poland	3	5	0	8
8	Spain	3	4	4	11
9	Israel	3	1	4	8
10	Italy	3	1	3	7
11	Japan	2	2	1	5
12	Hungary	2	0	0	2
13	New Zealand	1	5	3	9
14	Germany	1	3	3	7
15	Sweden	1	3	1	5
16	Belgium	1	2	1	4
16	Croatia	1	2	1	4
18	Austria	1	2	0	3
19	Greece	1	1	1	3
19	Portugal	1	1	1	3
21	Norway	1	1	0	2
22	Belarus	1	0	0	1
22	Cyprus	1	0	0	1
22	Singapore	1	0	0	1
25	Denmark	0	2	4	6
26	Finland	0	2	0	2
26	Switzerland	0	2	0	2
28	Argentina	0	1	2	3
29	Russia	0	1	1	2
29	Slovenia	0	1	1	2
31	Canada	0	0	1	1
31	China	0	0	1	1
31	Estonia	0	0	1	1
31	Ukraine	0	0	1	1
Totals (34 entries)		68	68	68	204

== See also ==
- Olympic sailing classes
- Sailing at the Summer Olympics
- World championships in sailing
- Windsurfing World Championships
