= Sailing at the 2016 Summer Olympics – 49er FX =

Women's 49er FX at the Games of the XXXI Olympiad
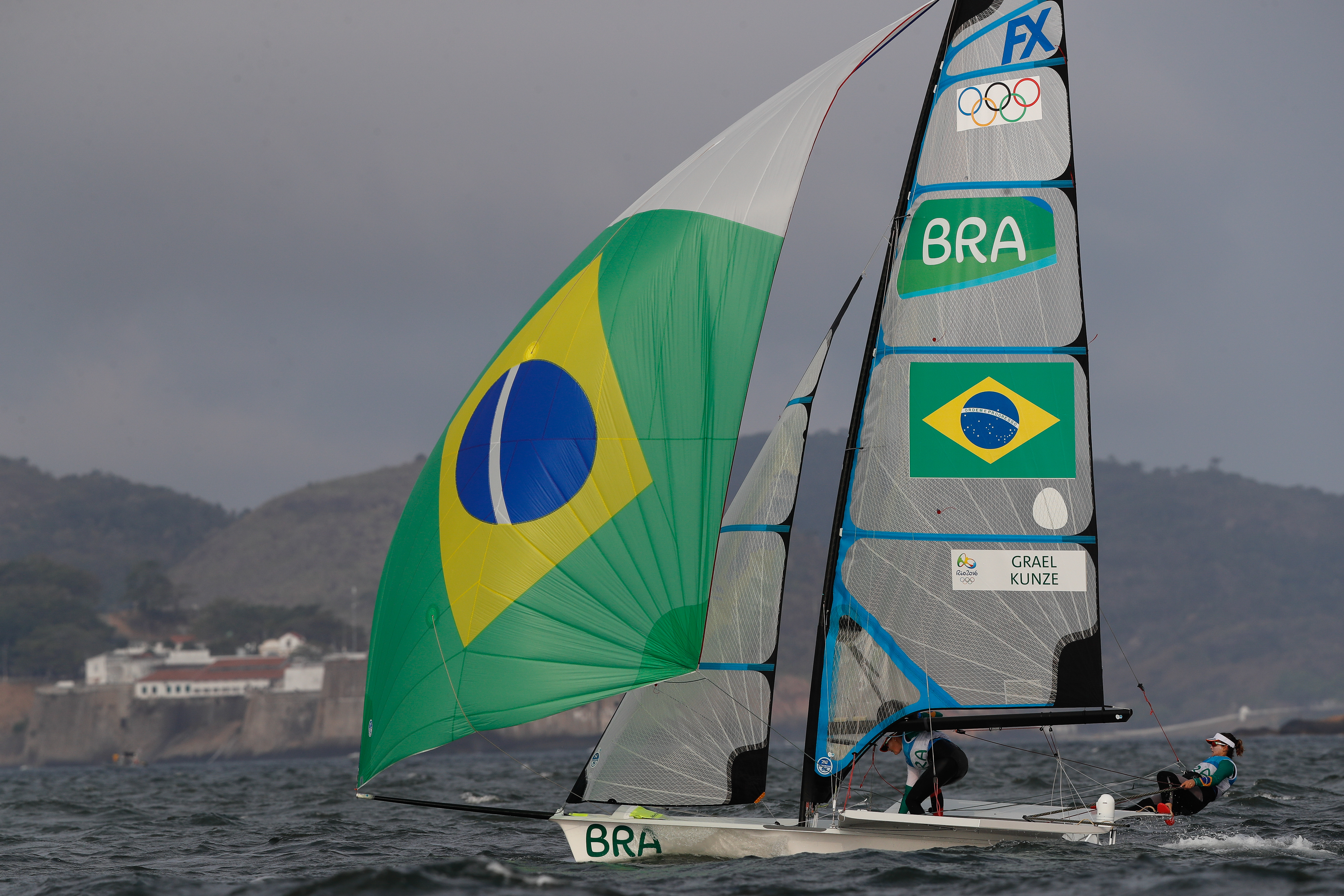
- Gold medal winners Grael and Kunze in their 49er FX.
- Venue: Marina da Glória
- Dates: 12–18 August
- Competitors: 40 from 20 nations
- Winning total: 48 points

Medalists
1st place, gold medalist(s)		Martine Grael; Kahena Kunze	Brazil
2nd place, silver medalist(s)		Alex Maloney; Molly Meech	New Zealand
3rd place, bronze medalist(s)		Jena Hansen; Katja Salskov-Iversen	Denmark

The Women's 49er FX was a sailing event on the Sailing at the 2016 Summer Olympics program in Rio de Janeiro and took place from 12 to 18 August at Marina da Glória. Thirteen races (the last one a medal race) were held.

The medals were presented by Barbara Kendall, IOC member, New Zealand and Carlo Croce, President of World Sailing.

== Schedule ==
Fri 12 Aug	Sat 13 Aug	Sun 14 Aug	Mon 15 Aug	Tue 16 Aug	Wed 17 Aug	Thu 18 Aug
Race 1 Race 2 Race 3	Race 4 Race 5 Race 6	Rest day	Race 7 Race 8 Race 9	Race 10; Race 11; Race 12	Rest day	Medal race

== Results ==
Results of individual races
Pos	Crew	Country	I	II	III	IV	V	VI	VII	VIII	IX	X	XI	XII	MR	Tot	Pts
Gold medal	Martine Grael; Kahena Kunze	Brazil	9	1	1	10	2	6	3	3	11^{†}	2	7	2	2	59.0	48.0
Silver medal	Alex Maloney; Molly Meech	New Zealand	6	5	4	4	5	1	6	12^{†}	3	3	5	5	4	63.0	51.0
Bronze medal	Jena Mai Hansen; Katja Salskov-Iversen	Denmark	UFD 21^{†}	2	2	2	4	2	9	16	2	1	2	4	8	75.0	54.0
4	Támara Echegoyen; Berta Betanzos	Spain	4	13^{†}	3	1	11	5	4	1	1	5	10	1	14	73.0	60.0
5	Giulia Conti; Francesca Clapcich	Italy	3	7	7	6	10	8	15^{†}	13	5	6	4	7	6	97.0	82.0
6	Sarah Steyaert; Aude Compan	France	1	9	10	12	12	13	1	9	4	16^{†}	1	2	10	101.0	85.0
7	Annemiek Bekkering; Annette Duetz	Netherlands	UFD 21^{†}	10	12	3	8	3	5	7	13	11	3	10	12	118.0	97.0
8	Charlotte Dobson; Sophie Ainsworth	Great Britain	2	11	5	8	7	10	2	5	9	15^{†}	14	8	20	116.0	101.0
9	Victoria Jurczok; Anika Lorenz	Germany	UFD 21^{†}	8	8	7	6	7	17	10	7	9	6	9	16	131.0	110.0
10	Paris Henken; Helena Scutt	United States	13	16^{†}	14	5	1	4	11	8	8	12	13	6	19	128.0	112.0
11	Lisa Ericson; Hanna Klinga	Sweden	11	6	9	15	3	9	10	2	16^{†}	14	9	15		119.0	103.0
12	Andrea Brewster; Saskia Tidey	Ireland	8	3	6	18	13	14	19^{†}	6	18	8	13	12		138.0	119.0
13	Victoria Travascio; Maria Sol Branz	Argentina	14	20^{†}	13	9	19	13	7	11	10	4	11	19		149.0	129.0
14	Ragna Agerup; Maia Agerup	Norway	10	18^{†}	15	17	9	17	13	4	6	13	17	11		150.0	132.0
15	Griselda Khng; Sara Tan	Singapore	12	19	17	11	14	11	8	20^{†}	15	7	8	13		155.0	135.0
16	Erin Rafuse; Danielle Boyd	Canada	5	4	11	16	16	16	18^{†}	17	12	18	16	14		163.0	145.0
17	Noora Ruskola; Camilla Cedercreutz	Finland	7	12	16	13	DSQ 21^{†}	15	14	15	14	10	20	18		175.0	154.0
18	Arantza Gumucio; Begoña Gumucio	Chile	16	14	18	14	15	19^{†}	12	14	17	17	15	16		187.0	168.0
19	Kätlin Tammiste; Anna Maria Sepp	Estonia	15	17	19	20^{†}	17	18	16	18	19	20	18	17		214.0	194.0
20	Keiko Miyagawa; Sena Takano	Japan	UFD 21^{†}	15	20	19	18	20	20	19	UFD 21	19	19	20		231.0	210.0

Scoring system: low-point system;
Legend: – Qualified for medal race(s); DSQ – Disqualified; UFD – "U" flag disqualification; † – Discarded race not counted in the overall result;
