= Ahmed Ragab =

Ahmed Ragab may refer to:

- Ahmed Ragab (satirist) (1928–2014), Egyptian satirist
- Ahmed Ragab (sailor) (born 1991), Egyptian sailor
