= Amanda Ng =

Singaporean sailor and windsurfer

Personal information
- Full name: Amanda Ng Ling Kai
- Nationality: Singaporean
- Born: 3 May 1994 (age 32) Singapore
- Height: 170 cm (5 ft 7 in)
- Weight: 58 kg (128 lb)

Sailing career
- Sport: Sailing
Medal record
Women's sailing
Representing Singapore
Southeast Asian Games
Bronze medal – third place	2011 Jakarta-Palembang	Mistral One Design

Amanda Ng Ling Kai (born 3 May 1994) is a Singaporean sailor. She and Jovina Choo placed 20th in the women's 470 event at the 2016 Summer Olympics. She also placed 26th in the women's RS:X event at the 2020 Summer Olympics, placed 4th in the women's RS:X event at the 2018 Asian Games, and won a bronze medal in the women's Mistral One Design event at the 2011 Southeast Asian Games.
