= Manuel Lelo =

Angolan sailor

Personal information
- Nationality: Angolan
- Born: 18 August 1987 (age 38)
- Height: 182 cm (6 ft 0 in)
- Weight: 73 kg (161 lb)

Sport
- Country: Angola
- Sport: Sailing

Manuel Lelo (born 18 August 1987) is an Angolan competitive sailor. He competed at the 2016 Summer Olympics in Rio de Janeiro, in the men's Laser class. He finished in 46th place. He returned to the Tokyo 2020 Olympics to coach the Angola Men's 470 team of Matias Montinho and Paixão Afonso.
