= Sailing at the 2016 Summer Olympics – Women's 470 =

Women's 470 at the Games of the XXXI Olympiad
- Line drawing of the 470
- Venue: Marina da Glória
- Dates: 10–17 August
- Competitors: 40 from 20 nations
- Winning total: 44 points

Medalists
1st place, gold medalist(s)		Hannah Mills; Saskia Clark	Great Britain
2nd place, silver medalist(s)		Jo Aleh; Polly Powrie	New Zealand
3rd place, bronze medalist(s)		Camille Lecointre; Hélène Defrance	France

The Women's 470 was a sailing event on the Sailing at the 2016 Summer Olympics program in Rio de Janeiro, in the 470 dinghy. It took place between 10 and 18 August at Marina da Glória. 11 races (the last one a medal race) were held.

The medals were presented by Barry Maister, IOC member, New Zealand and Sarah Webb Gosling, Vice President of World Sailing.

== Schedule ==
Wed 10 Aug	Thu 11 Aug	Fri 12 Aug	Sat 13 Aug	Sun 14 Aug	Mon 15 Aug	Tue 16 Aug	Wed 17 Aug
Race 1 Race 2	Race 3 Race 4	Race 5 Race 6	Rest day	Race 7 Race 8	Race 9 Race 10	Rest day	Medal race

== Results ==
Results of individual races
Pos	Crew	Country	I	II	III	IV	V	VI	VII	VIII	IX	X	MR	Tot	Pts
Gold medal	Hannah Mills; Saskia Clark	Great Britain	4	7	1	6	1	8^{†}	1	3	2	3	16	52.0	44.0
Silver medal	Jo Aleh; Polly Powrie	New Zealand	DSQ 21^{†}	1	4	1	12	21	3	1	1	4	6	75.0	54.0
Bronze medal	Camille Lecointre; Hélène Defrance	France	6	18^{†}	2	3	4	13	7	7	6	2	12	80.0	62.0
4	Afrodite Kyranakou; Anneloes van Veen	Netherlands	15^{†}	2	8	8	14	4	11	2	3	7	4	78.0	63.0
5	Ai Kondo; Miho Yoshioka	Japan	1	4	3	7	19^{†}	9	12	4	11	1	14	85.0	66.0
6	Tina Mrak; Veronika Macarol	Slovenia	2	6	5	4	UFD 21^{†}	12	4	DSQ 21	5	6	2	88.0	67.0
7	Annie Haeger; Briana Provancha	United States	7	3	10^{†}	2	5	5	2	8	8	9	20	79.0	69.0
8	Fernanda Oliveira; Ana Barbachan	Brazil	5	5	13	10	2	UFD 21^{†}	9	6	13	5	8	97.0	76.0
9	Lara Vadlau; Jolanta Ogar	Austria	3	12	12	5	6	1	5	16	DSQ 21^{†}	14	18	113.0	92.0
10	Agnieszka Skrzypulec; Irmina Gliszczyńska	Poland	10	14	9	RET 21^{†}	3	14	19	12	7	8	10	127.0	106.0
11	Nadja Horwitz; Sofia Middleton	Chile	9	11	18^{†}	16	10	2	10	10	14	15		115.0	97.0
12	Bàrbara Cornudella; Sara López	Spain	14	13	7	11	13	11	13	18^{†}	9	10		119.0	101.0
13	Alisa Kirilyuk; Liudmila Dmitrieva	Russia	UFD 21^{†}	DSQ 21	6	9	11	7	18	9	12	11		125.0	104.0
14	Linda Fahrni; Maja Siegenthaler	Switzerland	8	15	15	12	9	10	8	11	16	19^{†}		123.0	104.0
15	Carrie Smith; Jaime Ryan	Australia	16	8	11	17^{†}	7	6	14	15	17	12		123.0	106.0
16	Huang Lizhu; Wang Xiaoli	China	11	10	14	13	16	16	17^{†}	13	4	16		130.0	113.0
17	Gil Cohen; Nina Amir	Israel	UFD 21^{†}	9	19	15	17	17	15	5	10	13		141.0	120.0
18	Annika Bochmann; Marlene Steinherr	Germany	12	16	17	DNF 21^{†}	15	3	6	14	DSQ 21	17		142.0	121.0
19	Elena Berta; Alice Sinno	Italy	13	19	16	14	8	15	16	19	15	20^{†}		155.0	135.0
20	Jovina Choo; Amanda Ng	Singapore	17	17	20	DNF 21^{†}	18	UDF	20	17	18	18		187.0	166.0

Scoring system: low-point system;
Legend: – Qualified for medal race(s); DNF – Did not finish; DSQ – Disqualified; RET – Retired; UFD – "U" flag disqualification; † – Discarded race not counted in the overall result;
