= Katia Belabbas =

Algerian windsurfer

Personal information
- Born: Katia Belabbas; 1 February 1996 (age 30) Béjaïa, Algeria
- Height: 1.70 m (5 ft 7 in)
- Weight: 65 kg (143 lb)

Sailing career
- Sport: Sailing
Medal record
Women's RS:X
Representing Algeria
African Championship
Gold medal – first place	2015 Algiers	RS:X
Bronze medal – third place	2019 Algiers	RS:X
- Updated on 1 February 2020

Katia Belabbas (born 1 February 1996) is an Algerian windsurfer who competes in the RS:X class. She competed for Algeria at the 2016 Summer Olympics.

== Biography ==
Belabbas was born on 1 February 1996 in Béjaïa, Algeria. As of her Olympic appearance, she was 1.70 metres (5 ft 7 in) tall and weighed 65 kilograms (143 lb).

== Competitions ==
Belabbas was the first woman to represent an African nation in RS:X at the ISAF Sailing World Championships, in which she placed 62nd in 2014. At the time of the race, she had trained in RS:X for only eight months. She won a gold medal in the 2015 RS:X African Championship to qualify herself to the 2016 Summer Olympics. At the Olympics, she placed 26th in the women's RS:X event. She placed third in the 2019 RS:X African Championship in 2019, losing out on an Olympic qualifying spot to countrywoman Amina Bericchi.
