= Jovina Choo =

Singaporean sailor

Jovina Bei Fen Choo (born 10 February 1990) is a Singaporean sailor. She and Amanda Ng placed 20th in the women's 470 event at the 2016 Summer Olympics. Choo also won third place in the women's race at the 2015 Nations Cup.

Choo is an alumna of Nanyang Technological University. After her Olympic appearance, she became a development officer for the World Olympians Association.
