= Sailing at the 2023 Pan American Games – Men's Sunfish =

Men's Sunfish at the 2023 Pan American Games
- Venue: Cofradia Nautica del Pacifico
- Dates: October 28 – November 4
- Competitors: 8 from 8 nations

Medalists
Gold medal	Lee Parkhill	Canada
Silver medal	Jean Paul de Trazegnies	Peru
Bronze medal	Diego González	Chile

The men's Sunfish competition of the sailing events at the 2023 Pan American Games in Santiago was held from October 28 to November 4 at the Cofradia Nautica del Pacifico.

Points were assigned based on the finishing position in each race (1 for first, 2 for second, etc.). The points were totaled from the top 9 results of the first 10 races, with lower totals being better. If a sailor was disqualified or did not complete the race, 9 points were assigned for that race (as there were 8 sailors in this competition). The top 5 sailors at that point competed in the final race, with placings counting double for final score. The sailor with the lowest total score won.

Lee Parkhill from Canada won the gold medal after finishing second in the medal race, ahead of his opponents for the title. Jean Paul de Trazegnies from Peru was the runner-up and Diego González from Chile, who entered the medal race fighting for the gold in the regatta, had a poor performance in the last race to win the bronze medal.

== Schedule ==
All times are (UTC-3).

Date	Time	Round
October 28, 2023	16:15	Races 1 and 2
October 30, 2023	16:03	Races 3, 4 and 5
October 31, 2023	13:54	Race 6
November 1, 2023	16:05	Races 7 and 8
November 2, 2023	13:47	Races 9 and 10
November 4, 2023	12:05	Medal race

== Results ==
The results were as below.
Race M is the medal race.

Rank	Athlete	Nation	Race											Total Points	Net Points
Rank	Athlete	Nation	1	2	3	4	5	6	7	8	9	10	M	Total Points	Net Points
1st place, gold medalist(s)	Lee Parkhill	Canada	1	4	1	4	4	1	1	4	1	(5)	4	30	25
2nd place, silver medalist(s)	Jean Paul de Trazegnies	Peru	3	2	2	3	1	3	2	(5)	2	4	6	33	28
3rd place, bronze medalist(s)	Diego González	Chile	4	1	5	1	2	2	4	2	(7)	2	8	38	31
4	Marco Teixidor	Puerto Rico	3 STP	(9); DSQ	3	9 DSQ	3	6	5	3	4	1	2	48	39
5	Conner Blouin	United States	5	7	(8)	7	7	5	3	1	3	3	10	59	51
6	Diego Silvestre	Independent Athletes Team	(8)	3	4	6	6	4	6	6	5	6	—	54	46
7	Esneiry Pérez	Dominican Republic	(7)	6	6	2	5	7	7	7	6	7	—	60	53
8	Marx Guevara	Venezuela	6	5	7	5	(9); DNF	9 DNC	9 DNC	9 DNC	9 DNC	9 DNC	—	77	68
