= Ines Gmati =

Tunisian sailor (born 1997)

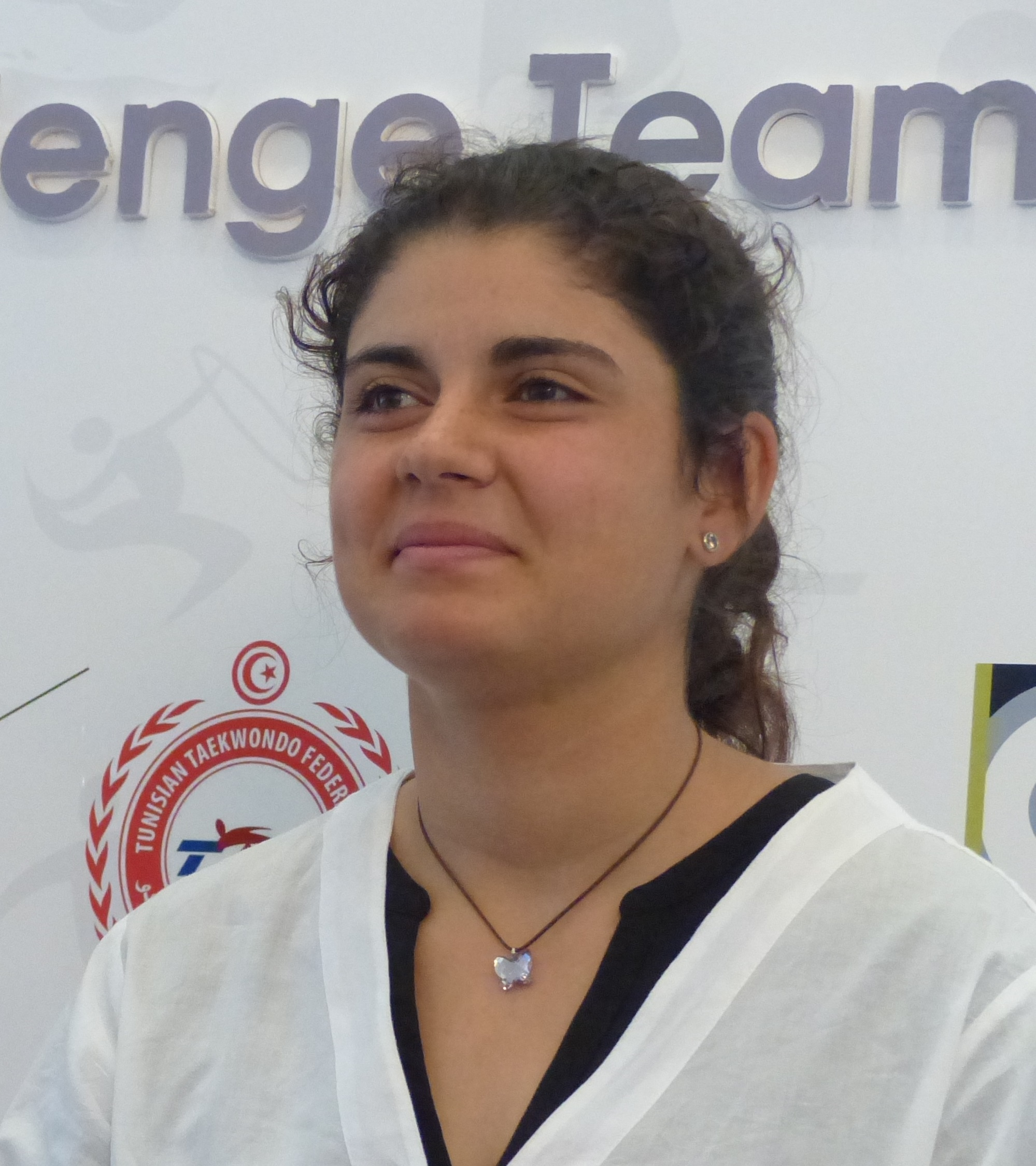
- Gmati in 2016

Personal information
- Nationality: Tunisia
- Born: 5 April 1997 (age 29)
- Height: 165 cm (5 ft 5 in)
- Weight: 70 kg (154 lb)

Sailing career
- Sport: Sailing
Medal record
Women's sailing
Representing Tunisia
African Games
Gold medal – first place	2011 Maputo	Optimist
- Updated on 25 August 2016

Ines Gmati (born 5 April 1997) is a Tunisian sailor. At the 2016 Summer Olympics she competed in the Women's laser radial.
