= Imène Cherif-Sahraoui =

Algerian sailor

Imène Cherif Sahraoui
Personal information
- Full name: Imène Ouneyssa Cherif Sahraoui
- Nationality: Algeria
- Born: September 14, 1995 (age 30)
- Height: 165 cm (5 ft 5 in)
- Weight: 64 kg (141 lb)

Sport

Sailing career
- Class: Laser Radial

Imène Ouneyssa Cherif Sahraoui (Arabic: إيمان ونعيسة شريف صحراوي, born September 14, 1995) is an Algerian sailor. She placed 37th in the Laser Radial event at the 2016 Summer Olympics.
