= Oleksandr Tugaryev =

Ukrainian windsurfer

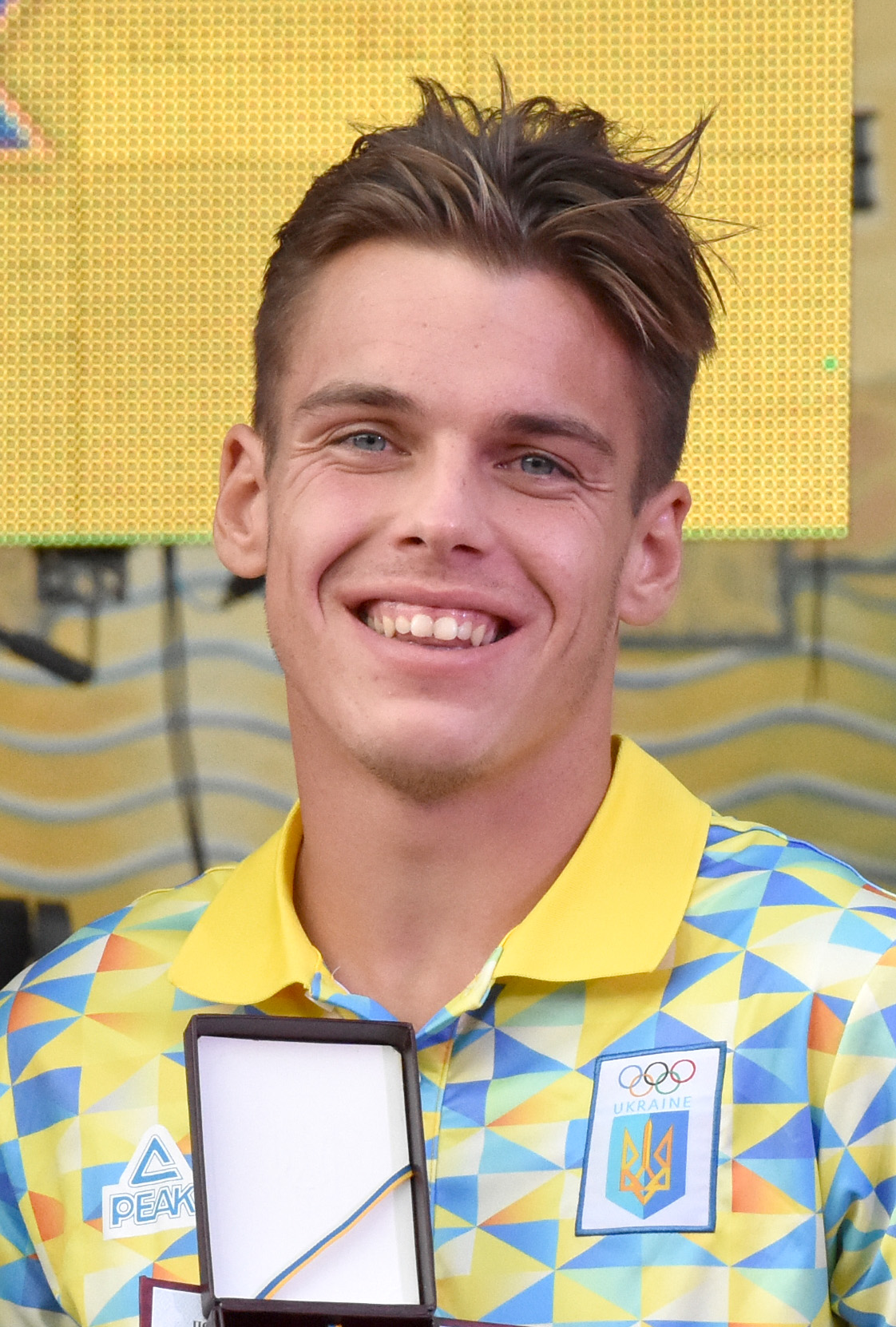

Personal information
- Born: 15 July 1995 (age 30) Ternopil Oblast, Ukraine

Sailing career
- Sport: Sailing

Oleksandr Tugaryev (15 July 1995, Ternopil Oblast) is a Ukrainian sailor, Master of sports of international class.

== Sports results ==
- Junior World Champion (2013) — 2nd place.
- European Champion (U-21, 2015) — 5th place.
- Multiple champion of Ukraine.
- First place in the National Regatta «Вітрильний Олімпійський тиждень», held in June 2016 near the town Vyshgorod.

Contest participants:

- Summer Olympics 2016 in Rio de Janeiro — class RS:X, results of 12 races took 23 place overall.

== Sources ==
- Українська олімпійська збірна на Іграх в Ріо // НОК України.
