= Alice Sinno =

Italian sailor

Alice Sinno (born September 8, 1992) is an Italian sailor. She and Elena Berta placed 19th in the women's 470 event at the 2016 Summer Olympics.

Sinno is an athlete of the Gruppo Sportivo della Marina Militare.
