= Pedro Pascual (sailor) =

American windsurfer

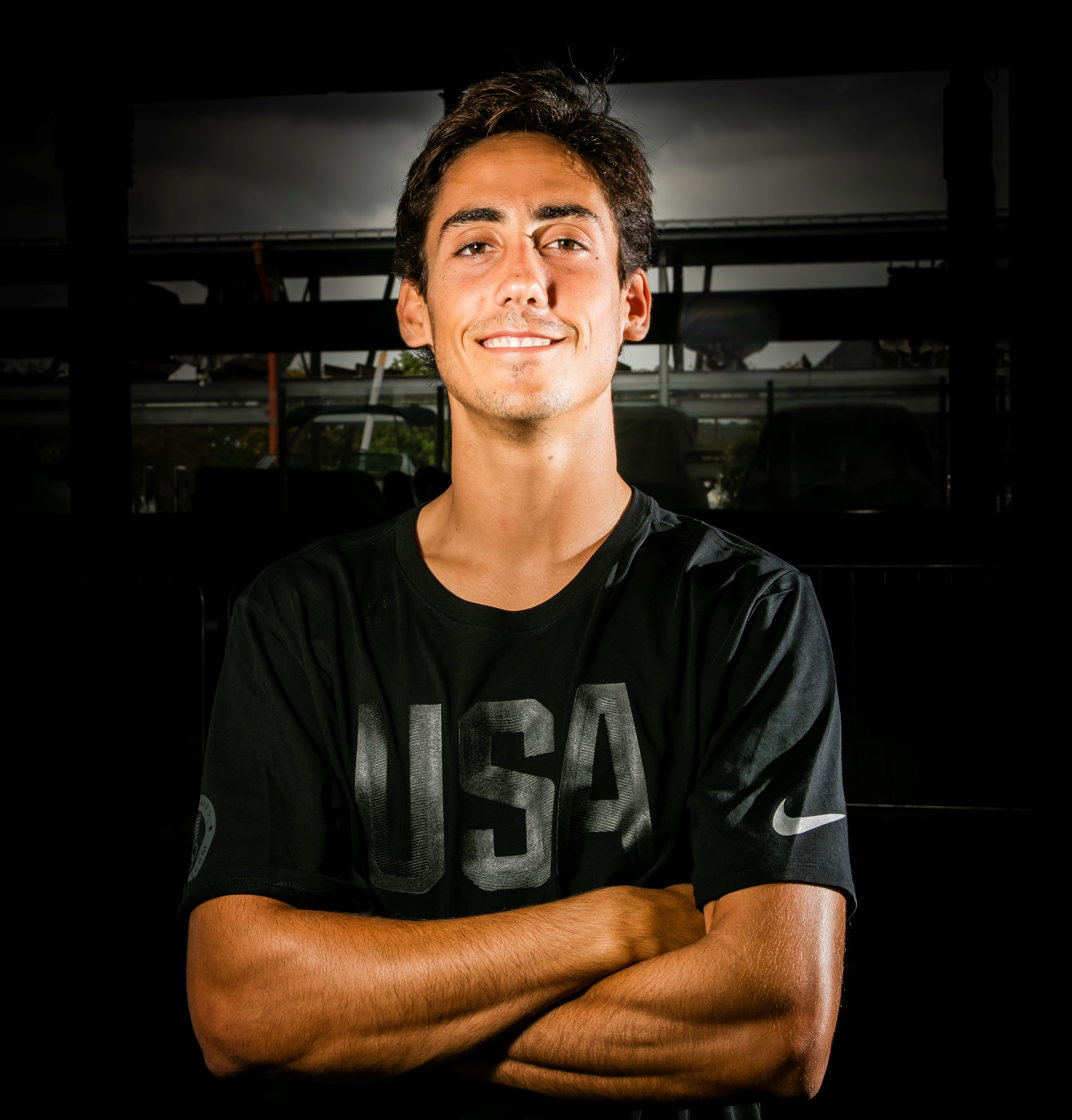

Personal information
- Full name: Pedro Pascual Suitt
- Nationality: American
- Born: March 5, 1996 (age 30) Córdoba, Mexico
- Height: 6 ft 1 in (185 cm)
- Weight: 163 lb (74 kg)

Sport
- Country: United States
- Sport: Olympic Windsurfing
Medal record
Men's sailing
Representing the United States
Pan American Games
Silver medal – second place	2019 Lima	RS:X

Pedro Pascual (born March 5, 1996) is an American competitive sailor. He competed at the 2016 Summer Olympics in Rio de Janeiro, in the men's RS:X, and at the 2020 Summer Olympics in Tokyo.

He qualified to represent the United States at the 2020 Summer Olympics, and proceeded to compete there in 2021.
