= Sara López (sailor) =

Spanish sailor

Sara López Ravetllat
Personal information
- Born: 29 November 1992 (age 33)

Sport
- Country: Spain
- Sport: Sailing

Sara López Ravetllat (born 29 November 1992) is a Spanish competitive sailor. She competed at the 2016 Summer Olympics in Rio de Janeiro, in the women's 470 class.
