= Sara Tan =

Singaporean sailor

Sara Tan Li Ching (born August 6, 1990) is a Singaporean sailor. She and Griselda Khng placed 15th in the women's 49erFX event at the 2016 Summer Olympics.
