= Dilara Uralp =

Turkish windsurfer (born 1995)

Personal information
- Nationality: Turkish
- Born: 16 November 1995 (age 30) Bad Urach, Baden-Württemberg, Germany
- Education: Dokuz Eylül University
- Height: 163 cm (5 ft 4 in)
- Weight: 54 kg (119 lb)

Sport
- Country: Turkey
- Sport: Windsurfing
- Event: RS:X
- Club: Çeşmealtı Windsurfing & Sailing Club

Dilara Uralp (born 16 November 1995) is a Turkish windsurfer who specializes in the RS:X class. She is a member of Çeşmealtı Windsurfing & Sailing Club in İzmir. She studies Physical Education and Sports at Dokuz Eylül University in İzmir.

Diara Uralp was born in Germany on 16 November 1995. In 2005, she began with windsurfing initiated by her father. She has been competing in domestic events since 2006, and internationally since 2010.

She earned a quota spot at the 2016 Summer Olympics, becoming the first ever Turkish participant to compete in windsurfing at the Olympics.
