= Sofia Middleton =

Chilean sailor

Personal information
- Born: 12 March 1993 (age 33)

Sport
- Country: Chile
- Sport: Sailing

Sofia Middleton (born 12 March 1993) is a Chilean competitive sailor. She competed at the 2016 Summer Olympics in Rio de Janeiro, in the women's 470 class.
