= Arantza Gumucio =

Chilean sailor

Personal information
- Born: 4 October 1989 (age 36)

Sport
- Country: Chile
- Sport: Sailing

Arantza Gumucio (born 4 October 1989) is a Chilean competitive sailor. She competed at the 2016 Summer Olympics in Rio de Janeiro, in the women's 49erFX.
