= Sebastian Fleischer =

Danish windsurfer

Personal information
- Nationality: Denmark
- Born: 26 December 1993 (age 32) Helsingør, Denmark
- Height: 1.79 m (5 ft 10 in)
- Weight: 69 kg (152 lb)

Sailing career
- Sport: Sailing
- Club: Royal Danish Yacht Club
- Class: Sailboard

Sebastian Fleischer (born 26 December 1993 in Helsingør) is a Danish windsurfer, who specialized in Neil Pryde RS:X class. As of November 2015, he is ranked no. 8 in the world for the sailboard class by the International Sailing Federation.

Fleischer competed in the men's RS:X class at the 2012 Summer Olympics in London by receiving a berth from the World Championships in Cádiz, Spain. Struggling to attain a top position in the opening series, Fleischer accumulated a net score of 220 for a twenty-ninth-place finish in a fleet of thirty-eight windsurfers.
