= Marion Lepert =

American windsurfer (born 1995)

Personal information
- Born: September 18, 1995 (age 31)

Sport
- Country: United States
- Sport: Sailing

Marion Lepert (born September 18, 1995) is an American competitive sailor. She competed at the 2016 Summer Olympics in Rio de Janeiro, in the women's RS:X.
