= Nations Cup (sailing) =

The Nations Cup is a yachting match racing competition run by the International Sailing Federation (ISAF) since 1991. It a "global championship to find the world's top match racing nations in open and women's events".

Typically, the boats are supplied by the event organizers, with sailors being randomly assigned boats each day, or swapping between matches.

Nations Cup Grand Final events have been held:

- 1991 Barcelona, Spain
- 1993 Hoorn, the Netherlands
- 1995 San Francisco, USA
- 2006 Crosshaven, Ireland
- 2009 Porto Alegre, Brazil
- 2011 Sheboygan, USA
- 2013 Middelfart, Denmark
- 2015 Vladivostok, Russia
- 2019 San Francisco, USA
