= Begoña Gumucio =

Chilean sailor

Personal information
- Born: 14 January 1992 (age 34)

Sport
- Country: Chile
- Sport: Sailing

Begoña Gumucio (born 14 January 1992) is a Chilean competitive sailor. She competed at the 2016 Summer Olympics in Rio de Janeiro, in the women's 49erFX.
