= Nicholas Heiner =

Dutch sailor (born 1989)

Personal information
- Born: 20 April 1989 (age 37) Enkhuizen, Netherlands
- Height: 1.86 m (6 ft 1 in)

Sailing career
- Sport: Sailing
- Classes: Laser; Finn; 49er; 470; 420
Medal record
Sailing
Representing Netherlands
World championships
Gold medal – first place	2014 Santander	Laser
Silver medal – second place	2019 Melbourne	Finn
Bronze medal – third place	2017 Balatonföldvár	Finn
European championships
Silver medal – second place	2018 Cádiz	Finn

Nicholas Heiner (born 20 April 1989) is a Dutch sailor.

Heiner was born in Enkhuizen, Netherlands, to Olympic Finn dinghy bronze medallist from Atlanta 1996, Roy Heiner.

He won the Laser event at the 2014 ISAF Sailing World Championships.

He represented the Netherlands at the 2020 Summer Olympics, placing fourth in the Finn event.
