= Lyudmila Dmitriyeva =

Russian sailor

Medal record

Women's sailing

Representing Russia

Military World Games
Silver medal – second place	2019 Wuhan	Mixed 470

Liudmila Vladimirovna Dmitrieva (Russian: Людмила Владимировна Дмитриева; born May 2, 1989) is a Russian sailor. She and Alisa Kirilyuk placed 13th in the women's 470 event at the 2016 Summer Olympics.
