= Huang Lizhu =

Chinese sailor

Personal information
- Born: 9 October 1987 (age 38) Qionghai, Hainan, China

Sport
- Country: China
- Sport: Sailing

Huang Lizhu (simplified Chinese: 黄丽珠; traditional Chinese: 黃麗珠; pinyin: Huáng Lìzhū, born 9 October 1987 in Qionghai) is a Chinese competitive sailor. She competed at the 2016 Summer Olympics in Rio de Janeiro, in the women's 470 class.
