= Noora Ruskola =

Finnish sailor (born 1994)

Noora Ruskola (born 21 December 1994) is a Finnish sailor. She and Camilla Cedercreutz placed 17th in the 49er FX event at the 2016 Summer Olympics.
