= Sara Carmo =

Portuguese sports sailor

Sara Carmo (born 12 October 1986, Cascais) is a Portuguese sports sailor. At the 2012 Summer Olympics, she competed in the Women's Laser Radial class, finishing in 28th place.
