= Stefano Marcia =

South African sailor

Stefano Marcia (born November 23, 1993) is a South African sailor. He competed at the 2016 Summer Olympics in the men's Laser event, in which he placed 40th.
