= Carrie Smith (sailor) =

Australian sailor

Personal information
- Nickname: Bear
- Nationality: Australian
- Born: 28 January 1995 (age 31) Fremantle, Western Australia, Australia
- Height: 165 cm (5 ft 5 in)
- Weight: 55 kg (121 lb)

Sailing career
- Sport: Sailing
- Club: Fremantle Sailing Club
- Class(es): 470, 420

Carrie Smith (born 28 January 1995) is an Australian competitive sailor. She competed at the 2016 Summer Olympics in Rio de Janeiro, in the women's 470 class.
