= Hanna Klinga =

Swedish sailor

Hanna Klinga (born 13 November 1989) is a Swedish sailor. She and Lisa Ericson placed 11th in the 49er FX event at the 2016 Summer Olympics.
