= Kätlin Tammiste =

Estonian competitive sailor (born 1996)

Kätlin Tammiste (born April 6, 1996) is an Estonian competitive sailor. She and Anna Maria Sepp placed 19th in the 49er FX event at the 2016 Summer Olympics.
