= Alisa Kirilyuk =

Russian sailor (born 1990)

Alisa Kirilyuk (born July 9, 1990) is a Russian sailor. She and Liudmila Dmitrieva placed 13th in the women's 470 event at the 2016 Summer Olympics.
