= Leonard Ong =

Singaporean windsurfer

Personal information
- Nickname: Lenny
- Nationality: Singaporean
- Born: 9 December 1992 (age 33) Singapore
- Height: 170 cm (5 ft 7 in)
- Weight: 68 kg (150 lb)

Sailing career
- Sport: Sailing
- Class: RS:X
Medal record
Men's sailing
Representing Singapore
Southeast Asian Games
| Bronze medal – third place | 2011 Jakarta-Palembang | RS:X |

Leonard Ong (born 9 December 1992) is a Singaporean sailor. He was placed 34th in the men's RS:X event at the 2016 Summer Olympics and was the first male windsurfer to represent the republic in 32 years.
