= Elena Berta =

Italian sailor

Personal information
- Nationality: Italian
- Born: 15 July 1992 (age 33) Rome, Italy
- Height: 1.71 m (5 ft 7 in)
- Weight: 57 kg (126 lb)

Sailing career
- Sport: Sailing
- Club: Circolo Canottieri Aniene
- Class(es): 470, 420
Medal record
Women's sailing
Representing Italy
World Championships
Bronze medal – third place	2021 Vilamoura	470
European Championships
Silver medal – second place	2017 Monaco	470

Elena Berta (born 15 July 1992) is an Italian sailor. She and Alice Sinno placed 19th in the women's 470 event at the 2016 Summer Olympics. and placed 13th in 470 at the 2020 Summer Olympics.
