= Mikita Tsirkun =

Belarusian windsurfer

Mikita Tsirkun (Belarusian: Мікіта Цыркун; born 24 March 1997) is a Belarusian sailor. He placed 22nd in the men's RS:X event at the 2016 Summer Olympics. and 18th in the men's RS:X event at the 2020 Summer Olympics.
