= Griselda Khng =

Singaporean sailor (born 1991)

Griselda Khng (born 31 July 1991) is a Singaporean sailor. She and Sara Tan placed 15th in the 49erFX event at the 2016 Summer Olympics.

Khng was the flag bearer for Singapore at the 2010 Summer Youth Olympics.

At the 117th IOC Session in Singapore, Khng gave IOC President Jacques Rogge the letter to say that London had won the competition to host the 2012 Olympics.
