= Bàrbara Cornudella =

Spanish sailor

Bàrbara Cornudella Ravetllat
Personal information
- Born: 6 September 1992 (age 33)

Sport
- Country: Spain
- Sport: Sailing

Bàrbara Cornudella Ravetllat (born 6 September 1992) is a Spanish competitive sailor. She competed at the 2016 Summer Olympics in Rio de Janeiro, in the women's 470 class.
