= Camilla Cedercreutz =

Finnish sailor

Camilla Cedercreutz (born 31 January 1993) is a Finnish sailor. She and Noora Ruskola placed 17th in the 49er FX event at the 2016 Summer Olympics.
