= Veronika Fenclová =

Czech sailor

Veronika Kozelska Fenclová (Czech pronunciation: [ˈvɛronɪka ˈfɛntslovaː]; born 21 January 1981 in Prague) is a Czech sailor. She competed in the Laser Radial class event at the 2012 Summer Olympics, where she placed ninth.
