= Anna Maria Sepp =

Estonian sailor (born 1996)

Anna Maria Sepp (born February 2, 1996) is an Estonian sailor. She and Kätlin Tammiste placed 19th in the 49er FX event at the 2016 Summer Olympics.
