= Nadja Horwitz =

Chilean sailor

Personal information
- Born: 10 March 1996 (age 30)

Sport
- Country: Chile
- Sport: Sailing

Nadja Horwitz (born 10 March 1996) is a Chilean competitive sailor. She competed at the 2016 Summer Olympics in Rio de Janeiro, in the women's 470 class. Her brother Kai Horwitz is an Olympic alpine skier for Chile.
