= Mathilde de Kerangat =

French sailor

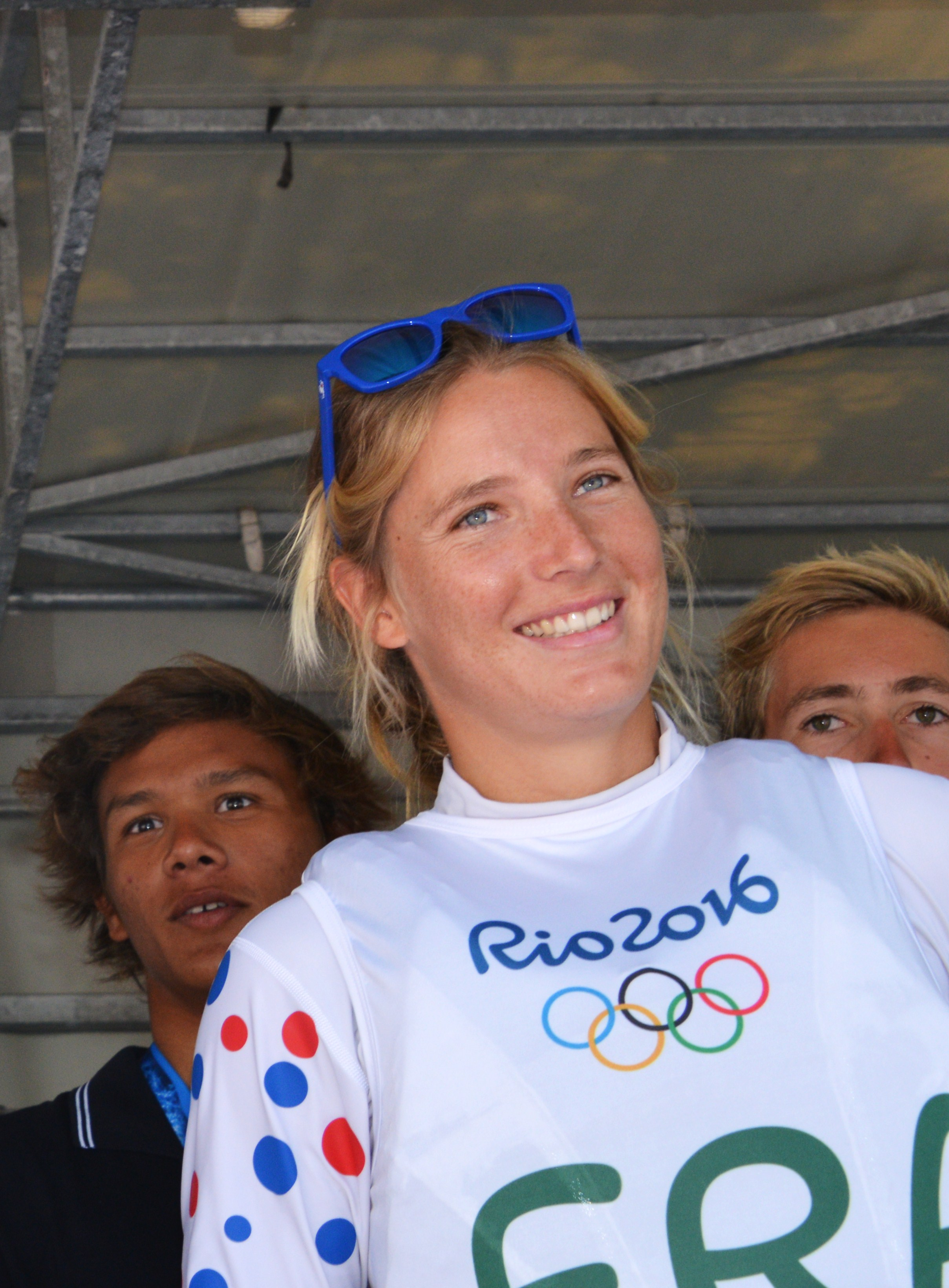
Mathilde de Kerangat during the return of the Charente-Maritime athletes from the Rio de Janeiro 2016 Summer Olympics

Mathilde de Kerangat (born 14 October 1991) is a French sailor. She placed 21st in the Laser Radial event at the 2016 Summer Olympics.
