= Andrea Brewster =

Irish sailor

Personal information
- Born: 10 October 1982 (age 42); Headley Down, Hampshire, England
- Height: 163 cm (5 ft 4 in)
- Weight: 62 kg (137 lb)

Sport
- Country: Ireland
- Sport: Sailing

Andrea Brewster (born 10 October 1982) is an Irish sailor. She represented Ireland at the 2016 Summer Olympics in the 49er FX class.
