= Annika Bochmann =

German sailor (born 1991)

Personal information
- Nationality: German
- Born: 16 July 1991 (age 34)
- Height: 1.67 m (5 ft 6 in)
- Weight: 58 kg (128 lb)

Sailing career
- Sport: Sailing
- Class: Dinghy (470)

Annika Bochmann (born 16 July 1991) is a German sailor, specializing in the 470 (dinghy) class. She represented Germany, along with partner Marlene Steinherr, in the women's 470 class at the 2016 Summer Olympics in Rio de Janeiro. They finished in 18th place.
