= Sára Cholnoky =

Hungarian windsurfer (born 1988)

Sára Cholnoky (born November 3, 1988) is a Hungarian sailor. She placed 23rd in the women's RS:X event at the 2016 Summer Olympics.
