= Jaime Ryan =

Australian sailor

Personal information
- Nationality: Australian
- Born: 8 May 1994 (age 32) Lake Macquarie, New South Wales, Australia

Sport
- Country: Australia
- Sport: Sailing
- Event: 49erFX

Jaime Ryan (born 8 May 1994) is an Australian competitive sailor. She competed at the 2016 Summer Olympics in Rio de Janeiro, in the women's 470 class.

Ryan qualified to represent Australia at the 2020 Summer Olympics. Sailing with Tess Lloyd, she competed in the 49erFX event, finishing 13th in the field of 21.

She is the sister of Australian competitive sailor, William Ryan, who won the gold medal in the 470 class.
