= María Celia Tejerina =

Argentine windsurfer

Celi Tejerina
Personal information
- Full name: María Celia Tejerina Mackern
- Born: 15 June 1994 (age 32) Godoy Cruz, Mendoza, Argentina

Sailing career
- Sport: Sailing
Medal record
Women's sailing
Representing Argentina
Pan American Games
Silver medal – second place	2019 Lima	RS:X

María Celia "Celi" Tejerina Mackern (Note: In this Spanish name, the first or paternal surname is Tejerina and the second or maternal family name is Mackern.) (born 15 June 1994) is an Argentine sailor. She placed 21st in the women's RS:X event at the 2016 Summer Olympics. She competed at the 2020 Summer Olympics.

She competed at the 2019 Pan American Games, winning a silver medal.
