= James Espey =

Irish sailor

James Espey (born 23 January 1984 in Bangor) is an Irish sailor. He has won a number of Irish regional and national titles. Espey qualified to compete at the 2012 Summer Olympics in the Men's Laser class, finishing 36th overall. He did not participate in the 2016 Summer Olympics, as Finn Lynch qualified ahead of Espey to take the Team Ireland spot in the Laser class.
