= Ketija Birzule =

Latvian windsurfer (born 1998)

Personal information
- Nationality: Latvian
- Born: 30 October 1998 (age 27) Riga, Latvia
- Height: 1.64 m (5 ft 5 in)
- Weight: 60 kg (132 lb)

Sailing career
- Sport: Sailing
- Club: Sailing Club 360
- Classes: RS:X, Techno 293

Ketija Birzule (born 30 October 1998) is a Latvian sailor. She represented her country at the 2016 Summer Olympics.
