= Michael Hansen (sailor) =

Danish sailor

Personal information
- Nationality: Danish
- Born: 14 February 1990 (age 36)

Sailing career
- Sport: Sailing
- Event: Laser

Michael Hansen (born 14 February 1990) is a Danish competitive sailor.

He competed at the 2016 Summer Olympics in Rio de Janeiro, in the men's Laser class.
