= Sena Takano =

Japanese sailor (born 1998)

Sena Takano (髙野 芹奈, Takano Sena, born March 1, 1998) is a Japanese sailor.

== Early life and education ==
Takano was born on March 1, 1998, in Osaka Prefecture, Japan. She began her studies at Kansai University.

== Athletic career ==
At the 2019 World Championships, she placed 20th. At the qualifying competition, her score was among the highest in Japan, and she was nominated to the Japanese national team.

At age 18, she participated in the 2016 Summer Olympics, becoming the youngest Japanese sailor to participate in the Olympic Games. Along with Keiko Miyagawa, she placed 20th in the 49erFX event.
