= Pierre Le Coq =

French windsurfer

Personal information
- Nationality: French
- Born: 17 January 1989 (age 37)

Sport
- Sport: Sailing
Medal record
Representing France
Men's Sailing
Bronze medal – third place	2016 Rio de Janeiro	Men's sailboard

Pierre Le Coq (born 17 January 1989) is a French competitive sailor.

He competed at the 2016 Summer Olympics in Rio de Janeiro, in the men's RS:X.
