= Jesper Stålheim =

Swedish sailor (born 1988)

Personal information
- Nationality: Swedish
- Born: 23 March 1988 (age 38) Karlstad, Sweden
- Height: 184 cm (6 ft 0 in)
- Weight: 82 kg (181 lb)

Sailing career
- Sport: Sailing
- Club: Royal Swedish Yacht Club
- Class(es): ILCA 7, 49er, Star

Jesper Stålheim (born 23 March 1988) is a Swedish competitive sailor. He competed at the 2016 Summer Olympics in Rio de Janeiro, in the men's Laser class where he finished in 16th place.

He has qualified to represent Sweden at the 2020 Summer Olympics in the men's Laser class.
