= Marlene Steinherr =

German sailor

Personal information
- Nationality: German
- Born: 10 September 1985 (age 40)
- Height: 1.74 m (5 ft 8 1/2 in)
- Weight: 69 kg (152 lb)

Sailing career
- Sport: Sailing
- Class: Dinghy

Marlene Steinherr (born 10 September 1985) is a German sailor specializing in the 470 (dinghy) class. She represented Germany, along with partner Annika Bochmann, in the women's 470 class at the 2016 Summer Olympics in Rio de Janeiro. They finished in 18th place.
