= Joaquín Blanco Albalat =

Spanish sailor (born 1989)

Joaquín Blanco
Personal information
- Full name: Joaquín Blanco Albalat
- Nationality: Spanish
- Born: 25 June 1989 (age 37) Gran Canaria
- Height: 181 cm (5 ft 11 in)
- Weight: 80 kg (176 lb)

Sailing career
- Sport: Sailing
- Club: Real Club Náutico de Gran Canaria
- Class: Laser
Medal record
Men's Sailing
Representing Spain
Mediterranean Games
Gold medal – first place	2018 Tarragona	Laser

Joaquín Blanco Albalat (born 25 June 1989) is a Spanish competitive sailor. He competed at the 2016 Summer Olympics in Rio de Janeiro, in the men's Laser class.

He is the son of Olympic sailor Joaquín Blanco Roca.
