= Maria Mollestad =

Norwegian windsurfer

Personal information
- Nationality: Norwegian
- Born: 23 July 1996 (age 29) Bærum, Norway

Sport
- Sport: Windsurfing
- Event: RS:X

Maria Mollestad (born 23 July 1996) is a Norwegian windsurfer.

She qualified to compete at the 2016 Summer Olympics in Rio de Janeiro.

== Personal life ==
Mollestad was born in Bærum on 23 July 1996.
