= Sergey Komissarov =

Russian sailor

Personal information
- Born: 3 December 1987 (age 38)

Sport
- Country: Russia
- Sport: Sailing

Sergey Anatolyevich Komissarov (Russian: Сергей Анатольевич Комиссаров; born 3 December 1987) is a Russian sailor in class "Laser". He competed at the 2016 Summer Olympics in Rio de Janeiro, in the men's Laser class.
