= Tom Ramshaw =

Canadian sailor

Personal information
- Full name: Thomas Ramshaw
- Nationality: Canada
- Born: November 18, 1991 (age 34) Toronto, Ontario
- Height: 1.82 m (6 ft 0 in)
- Weight: 96 kg (212 lb)

Sailing career
- Sport: Sailing
- Class(es): Laser, Finn

Thomas Ramshaw (born November 18, 1991, in Toronto, Ontario) is a Canadian sailor in the Finn class. Ramshaw qualified to compete at the 2016 Summer Olympics.

Ramshaw was originally a Laser competitor but later made the move to the finn class in the summer of 2015.

He represented Canada at the 2020 Summer Olympics.
