= Matias Montinho =

Angolan sailor

Personal information
- Nationality: Angolan
- Born: 15 July 1990 (age 35) Luanda, Angola
- Height: 167 cm (5 ft 6 in)
- Weight: 68 kg (150 lb)

Sailing career
- Sport: Sailing
- Club: Clube Naval de Luanda
- Class(es): 470, ILCA 6
Medal record
Men's sailing
Representing Angola
African Games
Bronze medal – third place	2011 Maputo	420
- Updated on 24 August 2016

Matias Montinho (born 15 July 1990) is an Angolan sailor. At the 2016, and 2020 Summer Olympics he competed in the Men's 470 with Paixão Afonso. At the 2024 Olympics he competed with Manuela Paulo in the 470 competition.

Olympic Games
Preceded by Luísa Kiala	Flag bearer for Angola; 2020 Tokyo with Natália Bernardo	Succeeded by Edmilson Pedro; Azenaide Carlos
