= Keiko Miyagawa =

Japanese sailor

Keiko Miyagawa (宮川 恵子, Miyagawa Keiko, born May 17, 1986) is a Japanese sailor. She and Sena Takano placed 20th in the 49erFX event at the 2016 Summer Olympics.
