= Yanic Gentry =

Mexican sailor (born 1991)

Personal information
- Full name: Yanic Arno Gentry Torfer
- Born: 20 February 1991 (age 35) Mexico City, Mexico
- Height: 184 cm (6 ft 0 in)
- Weight: 82 kg (181 lb)

Sport
- Country: Mexico
- Sport: Sailing

Yanic Arno Gentry Torfer (Note: In this Spanish name, the first or paternal surname is Gentry and the second or maternal family name is Torfer.) (born 20 February 1991) is a Mexican sailor. He competed at the 2016 Summer Olympics, in the Laser class, and placed 42nd among 46 participants.
