= Paixão Afonso =

Angolan sailor (born 1991)

Personal information
- Nationality: Angola
- Born: 2 January 1991 (age 35) Luanda, Angola
- Height: 176 cm (5 ft 9 in)
- Weight: 67 kg (148 lb)

Sport
- Sport: Sailing
- Event: 470
Medal record
Men's Sailing
Representing Angola
African Games
Bronze medal – third place	2011 Maputo	420
- Updated on 24 August 2016

Paixão Fernando Afonso (born 2 January 1991 in Luanda) is an Angolan racing sailor. At the 2016 Summer Olympics he competed in the Men's 470 with Matias Montinho. They finished in 26th place. He qualified to represent Angola at the 2020 Summer Olympics in the men's 470 with Matias Montinho again.
