= Cameron Pimentel =

Bermudian sailor

Personal information
- Born: 13 April 1991 (age 35)

Sport
- Country: Bermuda
- Sport: Sailing

Cameron Pimentel (born 13 April 1991) is a Bermudian competitive sailor. He competed at the 2016 Summer Olympics in Rio de Janeiro, in the men's Laser class.
