= Matías del Solar =

Chilean sailor

Personal information
- Full name: Matías Andrés del Solar Goldsmith
- Born: 29 November 1975 (age 50) Viña del Mar, Valparaíso, Chile
- Height: 184 cm (6 ft 0 in)

Sailing career
- Sport: Sailing
Medal record
Sailing
Representing Chile
Pan American Games
Silver medal – second place	2011 Guadalajara	Men's Laser
Bronze medal – third place	2003 Santo Domingo	Men's Laser

Matías Andrés del Solar Goldsmith (Note: In this Spanish name, the first or paternal surname is del Solar and the second or maternal family name is Goldsmith.) (born 29 November 1975), known as Matías del Solar, is a Chilean sailor. He competed at the 2004, 2008, 2012 and 2016 Summer Olympics in the Men's Laser class.
