= Viktor Teplý =

Czech sailor (born 1990)

Personal information
- Nationality: Czech Republic
- Born: 19 October 1990 (age 34); Brno, Czech Republic

Sport
- Sport: Sailing
- Event: Laser class

Viktor Teplý (Czech pronunciation: [ˈvɪktor ˈtɛpliː]; born 19 October 1990 in Brno) is a Czech sailor. He competed at the 2012 and 2016 Summer Olympics in the Men's Laser class.

== Career ==
In 2020, he was runner-up in the D-One Gold Cup 2020 that took place at Lake Lipno, Czech Republic behind Nick Craig.
