= Milivoj Dukić =

Montenegrin sailor

Personal information
- Born: 26 March 1993 (age 32) Cetinje, Montenegro, FR Yugoslavia
- Height: 185 cm (6 ft 1 in)
- Weight: 83 kg (183 lb)

Sport

Sailing career
- Class: ILCA 7

Milivoj Dukić (Миливој Дукић, born 26 March 1993) is a Montenegrin sailor. He competed at the 2012, 2016 and 2021 Summer Olympics in the men's Laser class. He was chosen as one of the flag-bearers for the Montenegro team at the 2024 Summer Olympics opening ceremony.
