= José Gutiérrez (sailor) =

Venezuelan sailor (born 1992)

Personal information
- Born: 12 October 1992 (age 33)

Sport
- Country: Venezuela
- Sport: Sailing

José Gutiérrez (born 12 October 1992) is a Venezuelan competitive sailor. He competed at the 2016 Summer Olympics in Rio de Janeiro, in the men's Laser class.
