= Gustavo Lima =

Portuguese sailor

Personal information
- Born: July 13, 1977 (age 49) Rio de Janeiro, Brazil

Sport
- Country: Portugal
- Sport: Sailing

Gustavo Lima (born 13 July, 1977) is a Brazilian born Portuguese sailor. Competing in the 2000 Summer Olympics, he finished 6th in the laser class. He improved his position by one place, finishing 5th at the 2004 Olympics. He finished 4th at the 2008 Summer Olympics. He also competed at the 2012 Summer Olympics in the Men's Laser class.
