= Ahmed Ragab (sailor) =

Egyptian sailor

Personal information
- Full name: Ahmed Ahmed Mahmud Ragab
- Born: 29 September 1991 (age 33); Alexandria, Egypt
- Height: 1.74 m (5 ft 9 in) (2016)
- Weight: 81 kg (179 lb) (2016)

Sailing career
- Class: Laser

Ahmed Ahmed Mahmud Ragab (Arabic: أحمد أحمد محمود رجب, born 29 September 1991) is an Egyptian competitive sailor. He competed at the 2016 Summer Olympics in Rio de Janeiro, finishing 43rd in the men's Laser class.
