= Kristian Ruth =

Norwegian sailor

Kristian Ruth (born 23 July 1985) is a Norwegian sailor. He competed at the 2008 and 2012 Summer Olympics in the Men's Laser class.
