= Youssef Akrout =

Tunisian sailor (born 1990)

Personal information
- Born: 15 November 1990 (age 35) Tunis, Tunisia
- Height: 180 cm (5 ft 11 in)
- Weight: 78 kg (172 lb)

Sailing career
- Sport: Sailing
- Club: Sport Nautique Bizertin
- Class(es): Laser, Laser Radial
Medal record
Men's sailing
Representing Tunisia
All-Africa Games
Gold medal – first place	2011 Maputo	Laser Radial
Pan Arab Games
Gold medal – first place	2011 Doha	Laser Radial

Youssef Akrout (born 15 November 1990) is a Tunisian sailor in the Laser and Laser Radial classes and sailing coach.

== Biography ==
Akrout was born in Tunis and represented Sport Nautique Bizertin. After winning the Laser event at the 2011 All-Africa Games, Akrout was the only Tunisian sailing competitor at the 2012 Summer Olympics. He competed at the 2012 in the men's Laser class. Akrout finished 45th.

He gained a place for Tunisia in the men's Laser event at the 2016 Olympics through his performance at the 2014 World Championship. He also won the 2015 African Laser and Laser Radial Championships. In the 2016 Summer Olympics, he finished 34th in the Laser event.

In 2016, he sailed his Laser dinghy from Haouaria in Tunisia to Mazara del Vallo on Sicily in 17 hours and 34 minutes. Akrout then took on a coaching career, first in Stavanger Seilforening of Norway, then in Chicago, before he became head coach of Stavanger Seilforening.
