= Sailing at the 2016 Summer Olympics =

Sailing at the Games of the XXXI Olympiad
- Venues: Marina da Gloria
- Dates: 8–18 August 2016
- No. of events: 10
- Competitors: 380 (217 male, 163 female) from 68 nations

Sailing at the 2016 Summer Olympics in Rio de Janeiro was held from 8–18 August at Marina da Gloria in Guanabara Bay. The sailing classes had two changes from the 2012 Summer Olympics events. There were 10 events.

== Overview ==
=== Equipment and event changes ===
- The RS:X, Laser, Laser Radial, Finn, 470, and 49er all return for 2016.
- The keelboat discipline has been dropped, meaning that both women's (Elliott 6m) and men's (the Star) are not part of the program. This is the first time the Olympics have not featured a keelboat.
- The multihull discipline has been reintroduced using the Nacra 17 since the Tornado was dropped for London 2012.
- A mixed gender event was introduced for the first time in Olympics Sailing. This follows to some degree the Paralympic sailing competition which in 2008 introduced a two-person keelboat discipline in the Skud 18 with a requirement for at least one of the two person crew to be female. Tennis and Badminton are the other Olympic sports with a mixed discipline.
- Women's skiff discipline has been added using the same equipment as the men's skiff discipline but with a slightly reduced sailplan 49erFX
- Kiteboarding was initially voted by the ISAF Council in May 2012 to replace windsurfing with kitesurfing and reaffirmed that vote on 9 November 2012. The move was controversial as former gold medalist and IOC member Barbara Kendall said she would challenge the decision and that "it’s exciting for kiteboarding but tragic for windsurfing. Kiteboarding really is a sport that should be at the X-Games." However, on 10 November 2012, the delegates at the International Sailing Federation’s General Assembly voted to keep windsurfing at the 2016 Olympic Games, overturning the ISAF Council's decision which had already been partially implemented within ISAF Events and Rankings.

=== Competition incidents ===
Following the announcement of the games, water pollution became a hot topic, and a commitment to cleaning up the water was given by the hosts. This target was not fully achieved and water quality issues were frequently in the media. World Sailing examined various options including holding the racing fully outside the bay or even moving the event to Buzios. However, in the end only the Belgian sailor Evi Van Acker reported that her Olympics were affected. The German sailor Erik Heil was also infected by multi-resistant germs during an Olympic test event in Rio. The location for sailing events was a source of concern for athletes since scientists had found drug-resistant super bacteria in Guanabara Bay due to the daily dumping of hospital waste and household raw sewage into the rivers and ocean. The Brazilian federal government's Oswaldo Cruz Foundation lab also found the genes of super bacteria in a river that empties into Guanabara Bay.

Just before the games the launch ramp collapsed but no one was injured.

== Competition format ==
=== Qualification ===
A total of 380 athletes competed in the sailing competitions of the Games. The qualification period began at the 2014 ISAF Sailing World Championships in September 2014. As hosts, Brazil was guaranteed one quota place in each of the ten events.

=== Classes (equipment) ===
Class	Type	Event	Sailors	Trapeze	Mainsail	Jib/Genoa	Spinnaker	First OG	Olympics so far
RS:X	Sailboard	women	1	-	+	-	-	2008	3
RS:X	Sailboard	men	1	-	+	-	-	2008	3
Laser Radial	Dinghy	women	1	-	+	-	-	2008	3
Laser	Dinghy	men	1	-	+	-	-	1996	6
Finn	Dinghy	men	1	-	+	–	–	1952	17
470	Dinghy	women	2	1	+	+	+	1988	8
470	Dinghy	men	2	1	+	+	+	1976	11
49er	Skiff	men	2	2	+	+	+	2000	5
49erFX	Skiff	women	2	2	+	+	+	2016	1
Nacra 17	Multihull	mixed	2	2	+	+	+	2016	1

=== Scoring ===
Racing at the 2016 Olympics was fleet racing where all competitors started and sailed the course together. They were scored according to the low-point system, where first place is scored 1, second place is scored 2, etc. There was a series of preliminary races followed by the final Medal Race. The RS:X, 49er, 49erFX, and Nacra 17 classes had 12 preliminary races, other classes have 10.

At the end of the preliminary races, the top ten boats in each class (i.e. those with the lowest total scores) advanced to the Medal Race. Each boat might exclude one race from their total. The Medal Race could not be excluded from the series score and counts double. The boat with the lowest overall total after all races was the winner. Any ties in the final rankings were broken in favour of the competitor/crew finishing higher in the Medal Race.

== Competition schedule ==
The competition started on 8 August and finished on 18 August.

●	Preliminary race	●	Medal race

Date → Event ↓	Mon 8	Tue 9	Wed 10	Thu 11	Fri 12	Sat 13	Sun 14	Mon 15	Tue 16	Wed 17	Thu 18
Men's RS:X	●●●	●●●		●●●	●●●		●				
Women's RS:X	●●●	●●●		●●●	●●●		●				
Men's Laser	●●	●●	●●		●●	●●			●		
Women's Laser Radial	●●	●●	●●		●●	●●			●		
Men's Finn		●●	●●	●●		●●	●●		●		
Mixed Nacra 17			●●	●●●●		●●●	●●●		●		
Men's 470			●●	●●	●●		●●		●●		●
Women's 470			●●	●●	●●		●●		●●		●
Men's 49er					●●●	●●●		●●●	●●●		●
Women's 49erFX					●●●	●●●		●●●	●●●		●

== Participation ==
=== Participating nations ===
- Algeria (3)
- Angola (3)
- Argentina (13)
- Aruba (3)
- Australia (11)
- Austria (8)
- Belarus (2)
- Belgium (4)
- Bermuda (2)
- Brazil (15)
- Canada (9)
- Cayman Islands (1)
- Chile (9)
- China (8)
- Colombia (1)
- Cook Islands (2)
- Croatia (8)
- Cyprus (2)
- Czech Republic (3)
- Denmark (11)
- Egypt (1)
- El Salvador (1)
- Estonia (5)
- Finland (8)
- France (15)
- Germany (12)
- Great Britain (15)
- Greece (7)
- Guatemala (1)
- Hong Kong (2)
- Hungary (5)
- Ireland (6)
- Israel (6)
- Italy (13)
- Japan (11)
- Latvia (1)
- Lithuania (2)
- Malaysia (2)
- Mexico (3)
- Montenegro (1)
- Netherlands (11)
- New Zealand (12)
- Norway (7)
- Peru (2)
- Poland (7)
- Portugal (5)
- Russia (7)
- Saint Lucia (1)
- Seychelles (3)
- Singapore (10)
- Slovenia (3)
- South Africa (3)
- South Korea (4)
- Spain (14)
- Sweden (7)
- Switzerland (9)
- Chinese Taipei (1)
- Thailand (4)
- Trinidad and Tobago (1)
- Tunisia (4)
- Turkey (6)
- Ukraine (3)
- United States (15)
- Uruguay (4)
- Venezuela (2)
- Virgin Islands (1)

== Medal summary ==
=== Medal table ===
Key

* Host nation (Brazil)

Rank	Nation	Gold	Silver	Bronze	Total
1	Great Britain	2	1	0	3
2	Netherlands	2	0	0	2
3	Australia	1	3	0	4
4	New Zealand	1	2	1	4
5	Croatia	1	1	0	2
6	France	1	0	2	3
7	Argentina	1	0	0	1
7	Brazil*	1	0	0	1
9	China	0	1	0	1
9	Ireland	0	1	0	1
9	Slovenia	0	1	0	1
12	Denmark	0	0	2	2
13	Austria	0	0	1	1
13	Germany	0	0	1	1
13	Greece	0	0	1	1
13	Russia	0	0	1	1
13	United States	0	0	1	1
Totals (17 entries)		10	10	10	30

=== Men's events ===
Games	Gold	Silver	Bronze
RS:X	Dorian van Rijsselberghe; Netherlands	Nick Dempsey; Great Britain	Pierre Le Coq; France
Laser	Tom Burton; Australia	Tonči Stipanović; Croatia	Sam Meech; New Zealand
Finn	Giles Scott; Great Britain	Vasilij Žbogar; Slovenia	Caleb Paine; United States
470	Croatia; Šime Fantela; Igor Marenić	Australia; Mathew Belcher; Will Ryan	Greece; Panagiotis Mantis; Pavlos Kagialis
49er	New Zealand; Peter Burling; Blair Tuke	Australia; Nathan Outteridge; Iain Jensen	Germany; Erik Heil; Thomas Plößel

=== Women's events ===
Games	Gold	Silver	Bronze
RS:X	Charline Picon; France	Chen Peina; China	Stefania Elfutina; Russia
Laser Radial	Marit Bouwmeester; Netherlands	Annalise Murphy; Ireland	Anne-Marie Rindom; Denmark
470	Great Britain; Hannah Mills; Saskia Clark	New Zealand; Jo Aleh; Polly Powrie	France; Camille Lecointre; Hélène Defrance
49erFX	Brazil; Martine Grael; Kahena Kunze	New Zealand; Alex Maloney; Molly Meech	Denmark; Jena Hansen; Katja Salskov-Iversen

=== Mixed events ===
Games	Gold	Silver	Bronze
Nacra 17	Argentina; Santiago Lange; Cecilia Carranza	Australia; Jason Waterhouse; Lisa Darmanin	Austria; Thomas Zajac; Tanja Frank
