= Lee Parkhill =

Canadian sailor

Medal record

Sailing

Representing Canada

Pan American Games
Gold medal – first place	2023 Santiago	Sunfish
Bronze medal – third place	2015 Toronto	Laser

Lee Parkhill (born November 22, 1988) in Oakville, Ontario is a Canadian sailor in the Laser class. His highest ranking is 11th in July 2014.

== Career ==
By 2007, he started sailing full rig Lasers, placing 4th in the Laser North American Championships in June 2007, 2nd at the Laser US Championships in August 2008, and finally winning the annual CORK regatta in August 2008. He finished 16th at the 2009 Laser Worlds, 15th at the 2010 Laser Europeans, 7th at the 2009 Miami OCR, 6th at the 2010 Miami OCR and 11th at the 2011 Princess Sofia. At the 2015 Pan American Games he won the bronze medal. He finished 43rd at the 2014 ISAF Sailing World Championships and 21st at the Olympic qualification ranking to earn a quota at the 2016 Summer Olympics for Canada.

In July 2016, he was officially named to Canada's Olympic team.

In 2023, he won a gold medal in Men's sunfish at the 2023 Pan American Games.
