= 2017 in sailing =

The following were the scheduled events of sailing for the year 2017 throughout the world.

== Events ==
=== Olympic classes events ===
==== World championships ====
- 19–26 August: Women's Laser Radial World Championship in Medemblik, Netherlands
    - (gold) : Marit Bouwmeester (NED)
    - (silver) : Evi Van Acker (BEL)
    - (bronze) : Manami Doi (JPN)
- 7–15 July: 470 World Championships in Thessaloniki, Greece
  - Men's 470
    - (gold) : Mathew Belcher & Will Ryan (AUS)
    - (silver) : Anton Dahlberg & Fredrik Bergström (SWE)
    - (bronze) : David Bargehr & Lukas Mähr (AUT)
  - Women's 470
    - (gold) : Agnieszka Skrzypulec & Irmina Gliszczyńska (POL)
    - (silver) : Hannah Mills & Eilidh McIntyre (GBR)
    - (bronze) : Tina Mrak & Veronika Macarol (SLO)
- 28 August – 2 September: 49er & 49er FX World Championships in Porto, Portugal
  - Men's 49er
    - (gold) : Dylan Fletcher-Scott & Stuart Bithell (GBR)
    - (silver) : James Peters & Fynn Sterritt (GBR)
    - (bronze) : Benjamin Bildstein & David Hussl (AUT)
  - Women's 49er FX
    - (gold) : Jena Hansen & Katja Salskov-Iversen (DEN)
    - (silver) : Martine Grael & Kahena Kunze (BRA)
    - (bronze) : Alex Maloney & Molly Meech (NZL)
- 1–10 September: Finn Gold Cup in Balatonföldvár, Hungary
  - (gold) : Max Salminen (SWE)
  - (silver) : Jonathan Lobert (FRA)
  - (bronze) : Nicholas Heiner (NED)
- 5–10 September: Nacra 17 World Championship in La Grande-Motte, France
    - (gold) : Ben Saxton & Katie Dabson (GBR)
    - (silver) : Fernando Echávarri & Tara Pacheco (ESP)
    - (bronze) : Ruggero Tita & Caterina Banti (ITA)
- 12–19 September: Laser World Championship in Split, Croatia
    - (gold) : Pavlos Kontides (CYP)
    - (silver) : Tom Burton (AUS)
    - (bronze) : Matthew Wearn (AUS)
- 16–23 September: 2017 RS:X World Championships in Enoshima, Japan
  - Men's RS:X
    - (gold) : Ye Bing (CHN)
    - (silver) : Mateo Sanz Lanz (SUI)
    - (bronze) : Gao Mengfan (CHN)
  - Women's RS:X
    - (gold) : Chen Peina (CHN)
    - (silver) : Wu Jiahui (CHN)
    - (bronze) : Lu Yunxiu (CHN)

==== Sailing World Cup ====
- 22 January – 11 June: 2017 Sailing World Cup
  - 22–29 January: Sailing World Cup Miami in Miami, United States
    - Men's 470 winners: Stuart McNay & David Hughes (USA)
    - Women's 470 winners: Afrodite Zegers & Anneloes van Veen (NED)
    - Men's 49er winners: Dylan Fletcher-Scott & Stuart Bithell (GBR)
    - Women's 49er FX winners: Martine Grael & Kahena Kunze (BRA)
    - Men's Laser winner: Jean-Baptiste Bernaz (FRA)
    - Women's Laser Radial winner: Vasileia Karachaliou (GRE)
    - Mixed Nacra 17 winners: Ben Saxton & Nicola Groves (GBR)
    - Men's RS:X winner: Louis Giard (FRA)
    - Women's RS:X winner: Lu Yunxiu (CHN)
  - 23–30 April: Sailing World Cup Hyères in Hyères, France
    - 2.4 Metre winner: Damien Seguin (FRA)
    - Men's 470 winners: Mathew Belcher & William Ryan (AUS)
    - Women's 470 winners: Afrodite Zegers & Anneloes van Veen (NED)
    - Men's 49er winners: Diego Botín le Chever & Iago López (ESP)
    - Women's 49er FX winners: Martine Grael & Kahena Kunze (BRA)
    - Men's Finn winner: Alican Kaynar (TUR)
    - Men's Formula Kite winner: Nicolas Parlier (FRA)
    - Men's Laser winner: Pavlos Kontides (CYP)
    - Women's Laser Radial winner: Evi Van Acker (BEL)
    - Mixed Nacra 17 winners: Fernando Echavarri & Tara Pacheco (ESP)
    - Men's RS:X winner: Louis Giard (FRA)
    - Women's RS:X winner: Zofia Noceti-Klepacka (POL)
  - 4–11 June: Sailing World Cup Final in Santander, Spain
    - Men's 470 winners: Panagiotis Mantis & Pavlos Kagialis (GRE)
    - Women's 470 winners: Hannah Mills & Eilidh McIntyre (GBR)
    - Men's 49er winners: James Peters & Fynn Sterritt (GBR)
    - Women's 49er FX winners: Martine Grael & Kahena Kunze (BRA)
    - Men's Finn winner: Ben Cornish (GBR)
    - Men's Formula Kite winner: Nicolas Parlier (FRA)
    - Men's Laser winner: Jean-Baptiste Bernaz (FRA)
    - Women's Laser Radial winner: Evi Van Acker (BEL)
    - Mixed Nacra 17 winners: Fernando Echavarri & Tara Pacheco (ESP)
    - Men's RS:X winner: Kiran Badloe (NED)
    - Women's RS:X winner: Patrícia Freitas (BRA)
- 15 October 2017 – 10 June 2018: 2018 Sailing World Cup
  - 15–22 October: Sailing World Cup Gamagōri in Gamagori, Japan
    - Men's 470 winners: Mathew Belcher & William Ryan (AUS)
    - Women's 470 winners: Agnieszka Skrzypulec & Irmina Gliszczyńska (POL)
    - Men's 49er winners: Dylan Fletcher-Scott & Stuart Bithell (GBR)
    - Women's 49er FX winners: Victoria Travascio & María Sol Branz (ARG)
    - Men's Laser winner: Sam Meech (NZL)
    - Women's Laser Radial winner: Anne-Marie Rindom (DEN)
    - Men's RS:X winner: Paweł Tarnowski (POL)
    - Women's RS:X winner: Hei Man H V Chan (HKG)

==== African championships ====
- 27 November – 2 December: RS:X African Championships in Moonbeach Resort, Egypt
  - (gold) : Hamza Bouras (ALG)
  - (silver) : Jean-Marc Gardette (SEY)
  - (bronze) : Mohamed Elsafty (EGY)

==== Asian championships ====
- 14–21 November: RS:X Asian Championships in Penghu, Taiwan
  - Men's RS:X
    - (gold) : Lee Tae-hoon (KOR)
    - (silver) : Cho Won-woo (KOR)
    - (bronze) : Makoto Tomizawa (JPN)
  - Women's RS:X
    - (gold) : Hei Man Chan (HKG)
    - (silver) : Sin Lam Sonia Lo (HKG)
    - (bronze) : Wai Yan Ngai (HKG)
- 28–29 October: Nacra 17 Asian Championship in Shanghai, China
    - (gold) : Ruggero Tita & Caterina Banti (ITA)
    - (silver) : Riley Gibbs & Louisa Chafee (USA)
    - (bronze) : Annette Vibourg & Mattias Brun (DEN)

==== European championships ====
- 5–13 May: Finn European Championship in Marseille, France
  - (gold) : Jonathan Lobert (FRA)
  - (silver) : Edward Wright (GBR)
  - (bronze) : Ben Cornish (GBR)
- 8–13 May: RS:X European Championships in Marseille, France
  - Men's RS:X
    - (gold) : Louis Giard (FRA)
    - (silver) : Byron Kokkalanis (GRE)
    - (bronze) : Mattia Camboni (ITA)
  - Women's RS:X
    - (gold) : Zofia Noceti-Klepacka (POL)
    - (silver) : Stefania Elfutina (RUS)
    - (bronze) : Flavia Tartaglini (ITA)
- 8–13 May: 470 European Championships in Monaco, Monaco
  - Men's 470
    - (gold) : Carl-Fredrik Fock & Marcus Dackhammar (SWE)
    - (silver) : Guillaume Pirouelle & Jérémie Mion (FRA)
    - (bronze) : Jordi Xammar & Nicolás Rodríguez (ESP)
  - Women's 470
    - (gold) : Afrodite Zegers & Anneloes van Veen (NED)
    - (silver) : Elena Berta & Sveva Carraro (ITA)
    - (bronze) : Agnieszka Skrzypulec & Jolanta Ogar (POL)
- 30 July – 4 August: 49er & 49er FX European Championships & Nacra 17 European Championship in Kiel, Germany
  - Men's 49er
    - (gold) : Dylan Fletcher & Stuart Bithell (GBR)
    - (silver) : James Peters & Fynn Sterritt (GBR)
    - (bronze) : Jacopo Plazzi & Andrea Tesei (ITA)
  - Women's 49er FX
    - (gold) : Tina Lutz & Susann Beucke (GER)
    - (silver) : Charlotte Dobson & Saskia Tidey (GBR)
    - (bronze) : Victoria Jurczok & Anika Lorenz (GER)
  - Mixed Nacra 17
    - (gold) : Ruggero Tita & Caterina Banti (ITA)
    - (silver) : Fernando Echavarri & Tara Pacheco (ESP)
    - (bronze) : Ben Saxton & Katie Dabson (GBR)
- 1–8 October: Laser European Championships in Barcelona, Spain
  - Men's Laser
    - (gold) : Nick Thompson (GBR)
    - (silver) : Francesco Marrai (ITA)
    - (bronze) : Pavlos Kontides (CYP)
  - Women's Laser Radial
    - (gold) : Marit Bouwmeester (NED)
    - (silver) : Anne-Marie Rindom (DEN)
    - (bronze) : Vasileia Karachaliou (GRE)

==== North American championships ====
- 14–16 January: 470 North American Championships in Coconut Grove, United States
    - (gold) : Giacomo Ferrari & Giulio Calabrò (ITA)
    - (silver) : Matthias Schmid & Lukas Maehr (AUT)
    - (bronze) : Jordi Xammar & Nicolás Rodríguez (ESP)
- 19–20 January: RS:X North American Championships in Miami, United States
  - Men's RS:X
    - (gold) : Pedro Pascual (USA)
    - (silver) : Ignacio Berenguer (MEX)
    - (bronze) : Juan Bosco Varela Barba (MEX)
  - Women's RS:X
    - (gold) : Marina Aalabau (ESP)
    - (silver) : Bruna Mello (BRA)
    - (bronze) : Demita Vega (MEX)
- 21–25 June: Laser North American Championship in Vancouver, Canada
  - Men's Laser
    - (gold) : Malcolm Lamphere (USA)
    - (silver) : Marek Zaleski (USA)
    - (bronze) : Henry Marshall (USA)
  - Open Laser Radial
    - (gold) : Luke Ramsay (CAN)
    - (silver) : Sophia Reineke (USA)
    - (bronze) : Maura Dewey (CAN)
- 22–25 June: 49er & 49er FX North American Championships in Kingston, Canada
  - Men's 49er
    - (gold) : Nevin Snow & Maximiliano Agnese (USA)
    - (silver) : William Jones & Evan DePaul (CAN)
    - (bronze) : Ryan Wood & Andrew Wood (CAN)
  - Women's 49er FX
    - (gold) : Erin Rafuse & Danielle Boyd (CAN)
    - (silver) : Carla Munte & Marta Munte (ESP)
    - (bronze) : Anna Yamazaki & Sena Takano (JPN)

==== South American championships ====
- 2–5 March: 470 South American Championships in Porto Alegre, Brazil
  - (gold) : Geison Mendes Dzioubanov & Gustavo Thiesen (BRA)
  - (silver) : Henrique Haddad & Bruno Abdulklech (BRA)
  - (bronze) : Fernanda Oliveira & Ana Barbachan (BRA)
- 13–17 November: RS:X South American Championships in Buenos Aires, Argentina
  - Men's RS:X
    - (gold) : Bautista Saubidet Birkner (ARG)
    - (silver) : Mariano Reutemann (ARG)
    - (bronze) : Francisco Saubidet (ARG)
  - Women's & Youth RS:X
    - (gold) : Patrícia Freitas (BRA)
    - (silver) : María Belén Bazo (PER)
    - (silver) : Daniel Pereira (BRA)

=== Other major events ===
==== America's Cup ====
- 26 May – 12 June: 2017 Louis Vuitton Cup in Great Sound, Hamilton, Bermuda
  - Winners: Emirates Team New Zealand
- 17–27 June: 2017 America's Cup in Great Sound, Hamilton, Bermuda
  - Emirates Team New Zealand defeated (United States) Oracle Team USA, 7–1.
- 20 & 21 June: 2017 Youth America's Cup in Great Sound, Hamilton, Bermuda
  - Winners: (United Kingdom) Land Rover BAR Academy (50 points); Second: (New Zealand) NZL Sailing Team (48 points); Third: (Switzerland) Team Tilt (42 points)

==== Extreme Sailing Series ====
- 8 March – 3 December: 2017 Extreme Sailing Series
  - 8–11 March: Act #1 in Muscat, Oman
    - Winners: (Denmark) SAP Extreme Sailing Team
  - 28 April – 1 May: Act #2 in Qingdao, China
    - Winners: (Switzerland) Alinghi
  - 29 June – 2 July: Act #3 in Madeira, Portugal
    - Winners: (Denmark) SAP Extreme Sailing Team
  - 20–23 July: Act #4 in Barcelona, Spain
    - Winners: Oman Air
  - 10–13 August: Act #5 in Hamburg, Germany
    - Winners: Oman Air
  - 25–28 August: Act #6 in Cardiff, United Kingdom
    - Winners: (Denmark) SAP Extreme Sailing Team
  - 19–22 October: Act #7 in San Diego, United States
    - Winners: (Denmark) SAP Extreme Sailing Team
  - 30 November – 3 December: Act #8 in Los Cabos, Mexico
    - Winners: (Switzerland) Alinghi

==== PWA World Tour ====
- 3–8 May: Korea
- 11–16 May: Fly! ANA Windsurfing World Cup in Yokosuka, Japan
- 23–28 May: Catalunya, Costa Brava PWA World Cup + Foil Race in Costa Brava, Spain
- 9–15 July: Gran Canaria, Spain
- 21–30 July: Fuerteventura, Spain
- 6–12 August: Tenerife, Spain
- 9–14 September: Waterz Festival in Hvide Sande, Denmark
- 29 September – 8 October: Mercedes-Benz World Cup in Sylt, Germany
- 21–26 November: Nouméa Dream Cup

==== Volvo Ocean Race ====
- 14 October 2017 – 30 June 2018: 2017–18 Volvo Ocean Race
  - 14 October: In-Port Race in Alicante, Spain
  - 22–28 October: Leg #1 from Alicante, Spain to Lisbon, Portugal
  - 3 November: In-Port Race in Lisbon, Portugal
  - 5–24 November: Leg #2 from Lisbon, Spain to Cape Town, South Africa
  - 8 December: In-Port Race in Cape Town, South Africa
  - 10–27 December: Leg #3 from Cape Town, South Africa to Melbourne, Australia

==== Women's International Match Racing Series ====
- 16 June – 16 December: 2017 Women's International Match Racing Series
  - 16–21 June: Women’s Match Racing World Championship in Helsinki, Finland
    - (gold) : Lucy MacGregor, Silja Frost, Rosie Watkins, Imogen Stanley, & Charlotte Lawrence (GBR)
    - (silver) : Renée Groeneveld, Marcelien Bos-de Koning, Lobke Berkhout, Sanne Akkerman, & Mijke Lievens (NED)
    - (bronze) : Trine Palludan, Lea Richter Vogelius, Vivi Lund Møller, Anne Sofie Munk-Hansen, & Joan Vestergård Hansen (DEN)
  - 7–12 August: Lysekil Women's Match in Lysekil, Sweden
    - Renée Groeneveld (NED) defeated Pauline Courtois (FRA), 3–1 in the final.
  - 13–18 November: Busan Cup Women's International Match Race in Busan, South Korea
    - Lucy MacGregor (GBR) defeated Trine Palludan (DEN), 3–0 in the final.
  - 30 November – 3 December: Carlos Aguilar Match Race in Saint Thomas, US Virgin Islands (cancelled)
  - 11–16 December: International Bedanne's Cup in Tourville-la-Rivière, France
    - Pauline Courtois (FRA) defeated Anne-Claire Le Berre (FRA), 3–1 in the final.

==== World Match Racing Tour ====
- 20 March – 8 October: 2017 World Match Racing Tour
  - 20–25 March: Match Cup Australia in Perth, Australia
    - Phil Robertson (NZL) defeated Matt Jerwood (AUS), 3–0 in the final.
  - 29 March – 2 April: Congressional Cup in Long Beach, United States
    - Ian Williams (GBR) defeated Johnie Berntsson (SWE), 3–2 in the final.
  - 2–9 July: GKSS Match Cup in Marstrand, Sweden
    - Phil Robertson (NZL) defeated Taylor Canfield (ISV), 3–0 in the final.
  - 1–6 August: Match Cup Russia in Saint Petersburg, Russia
    - Phil Robertson (NZL) defeated Sam Gilmour (AUS), 3–0 in the final.
  - 5–10 September: Chicago Match Cup in Chicago, United States
    - Ian Williams (GBR) defeated Phil Robertson (NZL), 3–0 in the final.
  - 3-8 October: Match Cup China in Xiamen, China
    - Torvar Mirsky (AUS) defeated Phil Robertson (NZL), 3–1 in the final.

=== Other classes ===
==== World championships ====
- 17–22 April: IFCA Youth & Masters Slalom World Championships in Almanarre, France
- 17–22 April: IFCA World Championships (Slalom Junior, Youth & Masters) in Hyères, France
- 9–17 June: Dragon World Championship in Cascais, Portugal
  - (gold) : Provezza Dragon – Andy Beadsworth, Ali Tezdiker, & Simon Fry (TUR)
  - (silver) : Annapurna – Anatoly Loginov, Vadim Statsenko, & Alexander Shalagin (RUS)
  - (bronze) : Alfie – Lawrie Smith, Hugo Rocha, João Matos Rosa, & Gonçalo Ribeiro (GBR)
- 10–15 June: RS:One World Championships in Hoi Han, Vietnam
- 20–25 June: Para World Sailing Championships in Kiel, Germany
  - 2.4 Metre World Championship:
    - (gold) : Heiko Kröger (GER)
    - (silver) : Matthew Bugg (AUS)
    - (bronze) : Damien Seguin (FRA)
  - Men's Hansa 303:
    - (gold) : Piotr Cichocki (POL)
    - (silver) : Christopher Symonds (AUS)
    - (bronze) : Jens Kroker (GER)
  - Women's Hansa 303:
    - (gold) : Violeta del Reino Diez del Valle (ESP)
    - (silver) : Ana Paula Gonçalves Marques (BRA)
    - (bronze) : Cherrie Pinpin (PHI)
- 24 June – 1 July: RS:X Youth World Championships in Torbole, Italy
- 29 June – 7 July: Star World Championship in Troense, Denmark
  - (gold) : Eivind Melleby & Joshua Revkin (NOR)
  - (silver) : Lars Grael & Samuel Gonçalves (BRA)
  - (bronze) : Reinhard Schmidt & Paul Sradnick (GER)
- 10–14 July: J/80 World Championship in Hamble-le-Rice, United Kingdom
- 11–21 July: Optimist World Championship in Pattaya, Thailand
  - (gold) : Marco Gradoni (ITA)
  - (silver) : Muhammad Fauzi Bin Kaman Shah (MAS)
  - (bronze) : Mic Sig Kos Mohr (CRC)
- 13-16 July: M32 World Championship in Marstrand, Sweden
  - (gold) : Phil Robertson & crew (NZL)
  - (silver) : Jonas Warrer & crew (DEN)
  - (bronze) : Chris Steele & crew (NZL)
- 15–21 July: Contender World Championship in Sønderborg, Denmark
  - (gold) : Jason Beebe (AUS)
  - (silver) : Mark Bulka (AUS)
  - (bronze) : Jesper Nielsen (DEN)
- 16–24 July: Laser 4.7 Youth World Championship in Nieuwpoort, Belgium
  - Boys' Laser 4.7
    - (gold) : Yılkan Timurşah (TUR)
    - (silver) : Sofiane Karim (FRA)
    - (bronze) : Cesare Barabino (ITA)
  - Girls' Laser 4.7
    - (gold) : Federica Cattarozzi (ITA)
    - (silver) : Giorgia Cingolani (ITA)
    - (bronze) : Ana Moncada Sanchez (ESP)
- 19–23 July: Hobie 14 World Championship in Noordwijk, Netherlands
- 21–30 July: Moth World Championship in Malcesine, Italy
  - (gold) : Paul Goodison (GBR)
  - (silver) : Peter Burling (NZL)
  - (bronze) : Iain Jensen (AUS)
- 23–28 July: Topper World Championships in Loctudy, France
- 26–29 July: Hobie Wild Cat World Championship in Noordwijk, Netherlands
- 26 July – 2 August: Under-21 Laser World Championships in Nieuwpoort, Belgium
  - Men's Laser
    - (gold) : Joel Rodríguez (ESP)
    - (silver) : Jonatán Vadnai (HUN)
    - (bronze) : Daniel Whiteley (GBR)
  - Women's Laser Radial
    - (gold) : Mária Érdi (HUN)
    - (silver) : Hannah Anderssohn (GER)
    - (bronze) : Magdalena Kwaśna (POL)
- 29 July – 5 August: 29er World Championship in Long Beach, United States
    - (gold) : Benji Daniel & Alex Burger (RSA)
    - (gold) : Benjamin Jaffrezic & Léo Chauvel (FRA)
    - (gold) : Theo Revil & Gautier Guevel (FRA)
- 31 July – 5 August: Open Bic World Championships in Arco, Italy
- 11–17 August: Laser Radial Youth World Championships in Medemblik, Netherlands
  - Boys' Laser Radial
    - (gold) : Dimitris Papadimitriou (GRE)
    - (silver) : Matias Dietrich (ARG)
    - (bronze) : Nicholas Bezy (HKG)
  - Girls' Laser Radial
    - (gold) : Hannah Anderssohn (GER)
    - (silver) : Dolores Moreira (URU)
    - (bronze) : Charlotte Rose (USA)
- 19–26 August: Men's Laser Radial World Championship in Medemblik, Netherlands
  - (gold) : Marcin Rudawski (POL)
  - (silver) : Eliot Merceron (SUI)
  - (bronze) : Zac Littlewood (AUS)
- 20–25 August: H-Boat World Championship in Brunnen, Switzerland
  - (gold) : Claus Høj Jensen, Frederik Dahl Hansen, & Rasmus Jørgen Andresen (DEN)
  - (silver) : Morten Nielsen, Niels Henrik Borch, & Claus Rossing (DEN)
  - (bronze) : Jan Forsbom, Timo Lankinen, Iiro Törnström, & Jukka Nikulainen (FIN)
- 20–27 August: Finn Silver Cup in Balatonfüred, Hungary
  - (gold) : Oskari Muhonen (FIN)
  - (silver) : Facundo Olezza (ARG)
  - (bronze) : Fionn Lyden (IRL)
- 23–26 August: 420 Team Racing World Championships in Campione del Garda, Italy
- 29 August – 3 September: in Boryeong, South Korea
- 12–16 September: J/70 World Championship in Porto Cervo, Italy
  - (gold) : Peter S. Duncan & crew (USA)
  - (silver) : Brian Keane & crew (USA)
  - (bronze) : Luca Domenici & crew (ITA)
- 15–21 September: 6 Metre World Cup in Vancouver, Canada
  - (gold) : Junior – Philippe Durr & crew (SUI)
  - (silver) : New Sweden – Ben Mumford & crew (CAN)
  - (bronze) : St. Francis IX – Andy Beadsworth & crew (GBR)
- 20–29 September: 505 World Championship in Annapolis, United States
  - (gold) : Mike Holt & Carl Smit (USA)
  - (silver) : Mike Martin & Adam Lowry (USA)
  - (bronze) : Andy Smith & Roger Gilbert (GBR)
- 21–30 September: Laser Masters World Championships in Split, Croatia
- 25–30 September: Flying Dutchman World Championship in Scarlino, Italy
  - (gold) : Szabolcs Majthényi & András Domokos (HUN)
  - (silver) : Hans-Peter Schwarz & Roland Kirst (GER)
  - (bronze) : Jørgen Bojsen-Møller & Jacob Bojsen-Møller (DEN)
- 4–8 October: IKA KiteFoil World Championships in Cagliari, Italy
- 4–9 September: 5.5 Metre World Championship in Benodet, France
  - (gold) : John B – Gavin McKinney, Mathias Dahlman, & Lars Horn Johannessen (BAH)
  - (silver) : New Moon – Mark Holowesco, Christoph Burger, & Peter Vlasov (BAH)
  - (bronze) : Feng Shui – Arend Jan Pasman, Ron Azier, & Kim Chabani (NED)
- 14–20 October: Kiteboarding World Championships in Porto Pollo, Italy
- 13–17 November: KiteFoil GoldCup Final (World Championships) in The Pearl, Qatar
- 18–24 November: Formula Kite World Championships in Muscat, Oman
- 11–15 December: Youth Sailing World Championships in Sanya, China
  - Boys' 29er winners: Théo Revil & Gautier Guevel (FRA)
  - Girls' 29er winners: Margherita Porro & Sofia Leoni (ITA)
  - Boys' 420 winners: Otto Henry & Rome Featherstone (AUS)
  - Girls' 420 winners: Carmen Cowles & Emma Cowles (USA)
  - Boys' Laser Radial winner: Maor Ben Hrosh (ISR)
  - Girls' Laser Radial winner: Charlotte Rose (USA)
  - Mixed Nacra 15 winners: Max Wallenberg & Amanda Bjork-Anastassov (SUI)
  - Boys' RS:X winner: Yoav Cohen (ISR)
  - Girls' RS:X winner: Emma Wilson (GBR)
  - Nation's Trophy winners: Italy

==== European championships ====
- 15–19 April: Laser 4.7 European Championship in Murcia, Spain
- 6–13 May: RS:X European Youth Championships in Marseille, France
- 28 May – 2 June: International 14 European Championship in Riva del Garda, Italy
- 3–5 June: RS Feva European Championship in Versoix, Switzerland
- 28 June −2 July: European Match Racing Championship in Ledro, Italy
- 29 June – 2 July: 11:Metre One Design European Championship in Flensburg, Germany
- 4–9 July: IFCA Men slalom european championship in La Tranche-sur-Mer, France
- 5–9 July: 505 European Championship in Warnemünde, Germany
- 11–16 July: in Gizzeria Lido, Italy
- 13–17 July: Soling European Championship in Riva del Garda, Italy
  - (gold) : Farkas Litkey, Károly Vezér, & Csaba Weinhardt (HUN)
  - (silver) : Florian Felzmann, Michael Felzmann, & Margund Schuh (AUT)
  - (bronze) : Igor Yushko, Sergey Pichugin, & Igor Severianov (UKR)
- 16–21 July: F16 European Championship in Morges, Switzerland
- 18–22 July: Para Sailing European Championship in Gdynia, Poland
- 22–30 July: 420 European Championships in Athens, Greece
- 24–28 July: RS100 European Championship in Alto Lario, Italy
- 25–29 July: OK European Championship in Faaborg, Denmark
  - (gold) : Lars Johan Brodtkorb (NOR)
  - (silver) : Charlie Cumbley (GBR)
  - (bronze) : Bo Petersen (DEN)
- 6–13 August: 420 European Junior Championships & 470 European Junior Championships in Riva del Garda, Italy
- 12–17 August: Formula Kite European Championships in Tirmata, Turkey
- 14–19 August: Dragon European Championship in Thun, Switzerland
  - (gold) : Pow Wow – Pedro Andrade, Bernardo Torres Pego, & Charles Nankin (POR)
  - (silver) : Rocknrolla – Dimitry Samokhin, Andrey Korolyuk, & Alexey Bushuev (RUS)
  - (bronze) : Bunker Prince – Yevhen Braslavets, Sergey Pugachev, & Sergey Timokhof (RUS)
- 14–17 September: Sunfish European Championship in Punta Ala, Italy
- 1–8 October: Laser European Championships in Barcelona, Spain
  - Men's Laser Radial
    - (gold) : Marcin Rudawski (POL)
    - (silver) : Marcelo Cairo Assenza (ESP)
    - (bronze) : Dimitri Papadimitriou (GRE)
- 21–27 October: Hansa European Championships in Étang de Thau, France
- 24–29 October: Star European Championship in Sanremo, Italy
  - (gold) : Torben Grael & Arthur Lopes (BRA)
  - (silver) : Diego Negri & Sergio Lambertenghi (ITA)
  - (bronze) : Augie Diaz & Bruno Prada (USA)

==== North American championships ====
- 13–17 August: 29er North American Championship in Kingston, Canada
- 24–27 August: Soling North American Championship in Milwaukee, United States
  - (gold) : Peter Hall, William Hall, & Gord Devries (CAN)
  - (silver) : Michael Dietzel, Hannes Ramoser, & Connor Clafin (GER)
  - (bronze) : Ross Richards, Patrick Richards, & Drew Kosmoski (USA)
- 5–10 September: Star North American Championship in Marblehead, United States
  - (gold) : Augie Diaz & Bruno Prada (USA)
  - (silver) : Luke Lawrence & Ian Coleman (USA)
  - (bronze) : George Szabo & Ed Morey (USA)

==== South American championships ====
- 23–27 November: Star South American Championship in Olivos, Argentina
  - (gold) : M. Bellotti & M. Bueno (BRA)
  - (silver) : H. Longarela & H. Longarela (ARG)
  - (bronze) : F. MacGowan & A. Simonet (ARG)

=== Other events ===
- 6–11 March: Bacardi Cup in Miami, United States
  - Winners: Mark Mendelblatt & Magnus Liljedahl (USA)
- 24 March – 1 April: Trofeo Princesa Sofía in Palma, Spain
  - Men's 470 winners: Tetsuya Isozaku & Akira Takayanagi (JPN)
  - Women's 470 winners: Afrodite Zegers & Anneloes van Veen (NED)
  - Men's 49er winners: James Peters & Fynn Sterritt (GBR)
  - Women's 49er FX winners: Victoria Jurczok & Anika Lorenz (GER)
  - Men's Finn winner: Max Salminen (SWE)
  - Men's Laser winner: Francesco Marrai (ITA)
  - Women's Laser Radial winner: Zhang Dongshuang (CHN)
  - Mixed Nacra 17 winners: Fernando Echavarri & Tara Pacheco (ESP)
  - Men's RS:X winner: Paweł Tarnowski (POL)
  - Women's RS:X winner: Zofia Noceti-Klepacka (POL)
  - Dragon winners: Lady Tati – Patrick de Barros & crew (POR)
  - J/80 winners: Francisco Javier Chacartegui Cirerol & crew (ESP)
- 23–27 May: Delta Lloyd Regatta in Medemblik, Netherlands
  - Men's Laser winner: Elliot Hanson (GBR)
  - Women's Laser Radial winner: Manami Doi (JPN)
  - Men's & Women's 470 winners: Pavel Sozykin & Denis Gribanov (RUS)
  - Men's 49er winners: Tim Fischer & Fabian Graf (GER)
  - Women's 49er FX winners: Enia Ninčević & Peiar Cupac (CRO)
  - Men's RS:X winner: Dorian van Rijsselberghe (NED)
  - 2.4 Metre winner: Megan Pascoe (GBR)
- 17–25 June: Kiel Week in Kiel, Germany
  - Men's 470 winners: Mathew Belcher & Will Ryan (AUS)
  - Women's 470 winners: Frederike Loewe & Anna Markfort (GER)
  - Men's 49er winners: David Gilmour & Joel Turner (AUS)
  - Women's 49er FX winners: Charlotte Dobson & Saskia Tidey (GBR)
  - Men's Finn winner: Deniss Karpak (EST)
  - Men's Laser winner: Francesco Marrai (ITA)
  - Women's Laser Radial winner: Silvia Zennaro (ITA)
  - Mixed Nacra 17 winners: Thomas Zajac & Barbara Matz (AUT)
  - 12 Metre winners: Kiwi Magic – Johan Blach Petersen & crew (DEN)
  - 2.4 Metre winner: Heiko Kröger (GER)
  - 29er winners: Benjamin Jaffrezic & Léo Chauvel (FRA)
  - 420 winners: Telis Athanasopoulos Yogo & Dimitrios Tassios (GRE)
  - 5.5 Metre winners: Hans Köster, Johannes Hensler, Jacob Oersted, & Lea Rüdiger (GER)
  - 505 winners: Jørgen Bojsen-Møller & Jacob Bojsen-Møller (DEN)
  - Albin Express winners: Jan Brink, Jörg Rüterhenke, Lasse Waltje, & Jan Günther (GER)
  - Contender winner: Jesper Nielsen (DEN)
  - Europe winner: Anna Livbjerg (DEN)
  - Flying Dutchman winners: Kay-Uwe Lüdtke & Kai Schäfers (GER)
  - Formula 18 winners: Iordanis Paschalidis & Konstantinos Trigkonis (GRE)
  - Hobie 16 winners: Knud Jansen & Christina Schober (GER)
  - J/24 winners: Mike Ingham, Max Holzer, Marianne Schoke, Quinn Schwenker, & Paul Abdullah (USA)
  - J/70 winners: Jens Marten, Justus Braatz, Terje Klockemann, & Tobias Strenge (GER)
  - J/80 winners: Martin Menzner, Frank Lichte, Mika Rolfs, & Nils Beltermann (GER)
  - Laser 4.7 winner: Tobias Sandmo Birkeland (NOR)
  - Open Laser Radial winner: Caroline Sofia Rosmo (NOR)
  - Melges 24 winners: Lennart Burke, Johan Müller, Valentin Ahlhaus, Daniel Schmidt, & Thore Petersen (GER)
  - Nordic Folkboat winners: Per Jørgensen, Kristian Hansen, & Bent Nielsen (DEN)
  - OK winner: Jim Hunt (GBR)
- 5–9 December: Star Sailors League Finals in Nassau, Bahamas
  - Winners: Paul Goodison & Frithjof Kleen (GBR)
- 26 December 2017 – 1 January 2018: 2017 Sydney to Hobart Yacht Race from Sydney, Australia to Hobart, Australia
  - Line honours: LDV Comanche – Jim Cooney (AUS), 1d 9h 15m 24s
  - Handicap winners: Ichi Ban – Matthew Allen (AUS), 2d 12h 13m 31s
