= 2018 in sailing =

The following are the scheduled events of sailing for the year 2018 throughout the world.

== Events ==
=== Olympic classes events ===
==== World championships ====
- 30 July – 12 August: 2018 Sailing World Championships in Aarhus, Denmark

==== Sailing World Cup ====
- 15 October 2017 – 10 June 2018: 2018 Sailing World Cup
  - 21–28 January: Sailing World Cup Miami in Miami, United States
    - Men's 470 winners: Luke Patience & Chris Grube (GBR)
    - Women's 470 winners: Tina Mrak & Veronika Macarol (SLO)
    - Men's 49er winners: Dylan Fletcher-Scott & Stuart Bithell (GBR)
    - Women's 49er FX winners: Victoria Jurczok & Anika Lorenz (GER)
    - Men's Finn winner: Giles Scott (GBR)
    - Men's Laser winner: Tom Burton (AUS)
    - Women's Laser Radial winner: Alison Young (GBR)
    - Mixed Nacra 17 winners: Jason Waterhouse & Lisa Darmanin (AUS)
    - Men's RS:X winner: Louis Giard (FRA)
    - Women's RS:X winner: Hélène Noesmoen (FRA)
  - 22–29 April: Sailing World Cup Hyères in Hyères, France
  - 3–10 June: Sailing World Cup Final in Marseille, France
- 9 September 2018 – 2019: 2019 Sailing World Cup
  - 9–16 September: Sailing World Cup Enoshima in Enoshima, Japan

==== Asian championships ====
- 24–30 June: 2018 Asian Sailing Championship in Jakarta, Indonesia.

==== European championships ====
- 9–17 March: Finn European Championship in Cádiz, Spain
  - (gold) : Edward Wright (GBR)
  - (silver) : Nicholas Heiner (NED)
  - (bronze) : Max Salminen (SWE)
- 5–12 May: Laser European Championships in La Rochelle, France
  - Men's Laser
    - (gold) : Pavlos Kontides (CYP)
    - (silver) : Philipp Buhl (GER)
    - (bronze) : Michael Beckett (GBR)
  - Women's Laser Radial
    - (gold) : Marit Bouwmeester (NED)
    - (silver) : Maxime Jonker (NED)
    - (bronze) : Emma Plasschaert (BEL)
- 16–24 May: 470 European Championships in Burgas, Bulgaria
  - Men's 470
    - (gold) : Anton Dahlberg & Fredrik Bergström (SWE)
    - (silver) : Panagiotis Mantis & Pavlos Kagialis (GRE)
    - (bronze) : Malte Winkel & Matti Cipra (GER)
  - Women's 470
    - (gold) : Tina Mrak & Veronika Macarol (SLO)
    - (silver) : Frederike Loewe & Anna Markfort (GER)
    - (bronze) : Nadine Boehm & Ann-Christin Goliass (GER)
- 5–13 July: 49er & 49er FX European Championships & Nacra 17 European Championship in Gdynia, Poland
  - Men's 49er
    - (gold) : Diego Botín & Iago López (ESP)
    - (silver) : Dominik Buksak & Szymon Wierzbicki (POL)
    - (bronze) : Dylan Fletcher & Stuart Bithell (GBR)
  - Women's 49er FX
    - (gold) : Helene Næss & Marie Rønningen (NOR)
    - (silver) : Victoria Jurczok & Anika Lorenz (GER)
    - (bronze) : Sophie Weguelin & Sophie Ainsworth (GBR)
  - Mixed Nacra 17
    - (gold) : Ruggero Tita & Caterina Banti (ITA)
    - (silver) : Fernando Echávarri & Tara Pacheco (ESP)
    - (bronze) : Christian Peter Lübeck & Lin Cenholt (DEN)
- 19–25 August: RS:X European Championships in Sopot, Poland

==== North American championships ====
- 13–15 January: 470 North American Championships in Miami, United States
  - Men's 470
    - (gold) : Luke Patience & Chris Grube (GBR)
    - (silver) : Anton Dahlberg & Fredrik Bergström (SWE)
    - (bronze) : Panagiotis Mantis & Pavlos Kagialis (GRE)
  - Women's 470
    - (gold) : Afrodite Zegers & Anneloes van Veen (NED)
    - (silver) : Ai Kondo & Miho Yoshioka (JPN)
    - (bronze) : Agnieszka Skrzypulec & Irmina Gliszczyńska (POL)
- 23–27 May: RS:X North American Championships in Cancún, Mexico
- 12–15 July: Laser North American Championship in Long Beach, United States

==== South American championships ====
- 22–25 February: 470 South American Championship in San Isidro, Argentina
- 1–4 March: RS:X South American Championships in Paracas, Peru
- 3–8 December: 49er & 49er FX South American Championships & Nacra 17 South American Championship in Florianópolis, Brazil

=== Other major events ===
==== Extreme Sailing Series ====
- 14 March – 2 December: 2018 Extreme Sailing Series
  - 14–17 March: Act 1 in Muscat, Oman
  - 24–27 May: GC32 World Championship in Lake Garda, Italy
  - 14–17 June: Act 2 in Barcelona, Spain
  - 5–8 July: Act 3 in Portugal
  - 9–12 August: Act 4 in Saint Petersburg, Russia
  - 24–27 August: Act 5 in Cardiff, United Kingdom
  - 18–21 October: Act 6 in San Diego, United States
  - 29 November – 2 December: Act 7 in Los Cabos, Mexico

==== PWA World Tour ====
- 10–15 May: Fly! ANA Windsurf World Cup in Yokosuka, Japan
- 19–24 May: Korea
- 5–10 June: Costa Brava, Spain
- 13–20 June: Portugal
- 15–21 July: Gran Canaria, Spain
- 26 July – 4 August: Fuerteventura, Spain
- 5–11 August: Tenerife, Spain
- 28 September – 7 October: Mercedes-Benz World Cup in Sylt, Germany

==== Volvo Ocean Race ====
- 14 October 2017 – 30 June 2018: 2017–18 Volvo Ocean Race
  - 2–19 January: Leg #4 from Melbourne, Australia to Hong Kong, China
  - 27 & 28 January 2018: In-Port Race in Hong Kong, China
  - 1 February: Leg #5 (non-scoring) from Hong Kong, China to Guangzhou, China
  - 3 February: In-Port Race in Guangzhou, China
  - 7 February: Leg #6 from Guangzhou, China to Auckland, New Zelanda
  - 10 March: In-Port Race in Auckland, New Zealand
  - 18 March: Leg #7 from Auckland, New Zealand to Itajaí, Brazil
  - 20 April: In-Port Race in Itajaí, Brazil
  - 22 April: Leg #8 from Itajaí, Brazil to Newport, United States
  - 19 May: In-Port Race in Newport, United States
  - 20 May: Leg #9 from Newport, United States to Cardiff, United Kingdom
  - 8 June: In-Port Race in Cardiff, United Kingdom
  - 10 June: Leg #10 from Cardiff, United Kingdom to Gothenburg, Sweden
  - 17 June: In-Port Race in Gothenburg, Sweden
  - 21 June: Leg #11 from Gothenburg, Sweden to The Hague, Netherlands
  - 30 June: In-Port Race in The Hague, Netherlands

=== Other classes ===
==== World championships ====
- 14–22 July: Youth Sailing World Championships in Corpus Christi, United States

| Event | | Host | | Winners | | Participation | | Ref. |
| Title | Date | Club | Country | Event | Winners | Boats | Nats | Ref. |
|---|---|---|---|---|---|---|---|---|
| 2.4 Metre World Championship | 4–10 August | Gefle Segelsällskap | Sweden | Open | | | | |
| 5.5 Metre World Championship | 20-24 Aug | Royal Yacht Squadron | United Kingdom | Open | BAH 21 - New Moon; Mark Holowesko (BAH); Christoph Burger (SUI); Peter Vlasov (BAH) | 25 | 12 | |
| International 14 World Championships | 12–25 August | | United States | Open | | | | |
| 420 World Championships | 8–15 August | | United States | Open | | | | |
| 505 World Championship | 22–27 July | | Poland | Open | Lutz Stengel; Holger Jess | 127 | 14 | |
| B14 World Championship | 1-6 Jan | Port Dalrymple Yacht Club | Australia | Open | | | | |
| A-Cat World Championship | 23–30 Aug | | Australia | Open | | | | |
| Contender World Championship | 19–25 Jan | | Australia | Open | | | | |
| Etchells World Championship | 18-27 Oct | Royal Queensland Yacht Squadron | Australia | Open | | | | |
| Farr 40 World Championship | 6-9 Oct | Chicago Yacht Club | United States | Open | | 14 | | |
| Finn Youth World Championship | 25–30 August | | Slovenia | Open | | | | |
| Formula 18 World Championship | 12-19 Oct | Sarasota Yacht Club | United States | Open | | 78 | | |
| J/22 World Championship | 8-14 Sept. | Annapolis Yacht Club | United States | Open | | | | |
| J/24 World Championship | 24-31 Aug | Fraglia Vela Riva | Italy | Open | | | | |
| J/70 World Championship | 22–29 Sept. | | United States | Open | | | | |
| J/80 World Championship | 6-14 Jul | Sports Nautiques Sablais | France | Open | | 73 | 8 | |
| Youth Lightning World Championship | 3-7 July | Nautical Athletic Club of Voula | Greece | Open U-24 | | 16 | | |
| Melges 20 World Championship | 10-13 Oct. | Yacht Club Cagliari | Italy | Open | | 36 | 16 | |
| Melges 24 World Championship | 31May -9Jun | Royal Victoria Yacht Club | Canada | Open | | 41 | 7+ | |
| Melges 32 World Championship | | Yacht Club Cagliari | France | Open | | 18 | | |
| Moth World Championship | 25 March – 1 April | | Bermuda | Open | | | | |
| RS Feva World Championship | 1–8 April | | United States | Open | | | | |
| RS Tera World Championships | 4-10 Aug | Weymouth and Portland National Sailing Academy | United Kingdom | Open Sport | | | | |
| RS Tera World Championships | 4-10 Aug | Weymouth and Portland National Sailing Academy | United Kingdom | Open Pro | | | | |
| RS:X Youth World Championships | 1–8 July | | France | Male | | | | |
| RS:X Youth World Championships | 1–8 July | | France | Female | | | | |
| Star World Championship | 5–15 Oct | | United States | Open | | | | |
| TP52 World Championship | 17-21 July | Clube Naval de Cascais | Portugal | Open | | 9 | | |
| Techno 293 World Championships | 4–12 Aug. | | Latvia | Male U15 | | 72 | 23 | |
| Techno 293 World Championships | 4–12 Aug. | | Latvia | Female U15 | | 39 | 12 | |
| Techno 293 World Championships | 4–12 Aug. | | Latvia | Male U17 | | 81 | 23 | |
| Techno 293 World Championships | 4–12 Aug. | | Latvia | Female U17 | | 100 | 30 | |
| Techno 293 World Championships | 4–12 Aug. | | Latvia | Male U19+Rig | | 35 | 20 | |
| Techno 293 World Championships | 4–12 Aug. | | Latvia | Female U19+Rig | | 32 | 18 | |
| Techno 293 World Championships | 4–12 Aug. | | Latvia | Male + Rig | | 52 | 23 | |
| Techno 293 World Championships | 4–12 Aug. | | Latvia | Female + Rig | | 36 | 20 | |
| Yngling World Championship | 8-14 July | Fraglia Vela Riva | Italy | Open | | | | |

==== Asian championships ====
- 7–11 February: Techno 293+ Asian Championships in Singapore, Singapore

==== European championships ====
- 1–7 April: Techno 293+ European Championships in Mondello, Italy
- 7–14 April: One Metre European Championship in Rogoznica, Croatia
- 28 May – 1 June: Dragon European Championship in Balatonfüred, Hungary
- 3–11 July: 470 European Junior Championships & 420 European Junior Championships in Sesimbra, Portugal
- 8–13 July: Formula Kite European Championship in La Rochelle, France
- 7–12 August: Star European Championship in Flensburg, Germany
- 19–25 August: RS:X European Youth Championships in Sopot, Poland
- 29 August – 8 September: 6 Metre European Championship in La Trinité-sur-Mer, France
- 20–27 October: Techno 293 European Championships in Athens, Greece

==== North American championships ====
- 23–27 May: Techno 293+ North American Championships in Cancún, Mexico
- 4–8 July: Viper North American Championships in Kingston, Canada
- 14–19 August: Star North American Championship in Los Angeles, United States

==== South American championships ====
- 25–28 February: Techno 293+ South American Championships in Paracas, Peru
- 7–11 November: Star South American Championship in Rio de Janeiro, Brazil

=== Other events ===
- 30 March – 7 April: Trofeo Princesa Sofía in Palma, Spain
- 21–26 May: Medemblik Regatta in Medemblik, Netherlands
- 16–24 June: Kiel Week in Kiel, Germany
- 18 August – 2 September: 2018 Asian Games in Jakarta-Palembang, Indonesia
- 6–18 October: 2018 Summer Youth Olympics in Buenos Aires, Argentina
- 3–8 December: Star Sailors League Finals in Nassau, Bahamas
