= 470 Junior World Championships =

The 470 Junior World Championships have been held every year since 1970 and organised by the club on behalf of the International 470 Class Association and recognized by World Sailing.

The class also has it main 470 World Championships and additional World Championships organized by World Sailing when the class was used in the ISAF Youth Sailing World Championships and the IYRU Women's Sailing World Championships and World Sailing Games.

== Editions ==
| Editions | Date | | Host | | | Sailors | | | | Boats | | | | | Ref. |
| Editions | Dates | Year | Host club | Location | Nat. | Age | Tot | Nat | Con | Event | | | M/F | F/M | Ref. |
|---|---|---|---|---|---|---|---|---|---|---|---|---|---|---|---|
| 1 | | 1979 | | Alassio | Italy | Juniors | 102 | 12 | | Open | 51 | | | | |
| 2 | | 1980 | | Rovinj | Yugoslavia | Juniors | | | | Open | | | | | |
| 3 | 6–12 July | 1981 | | Monnickendam | Netherlands | Juniors | 124 | 20 | | Open | 62 | | | | |
| 4 | - | 1982 | | Helsingborg | Sweden | Juniors | 100 | 13 | | Open | 50 | | | | |
| 5 | - | 1983 | | Mörbisch | Austria | Juniors | 108 | 14 | | Open | 54 | | | | |
| 6 | 31 July to 4 Aug | 1984 | | St. Moritz | Switzerland | Juniors | 96 | 14 | | Open | 48 | | | | |
| 7 | 3 - 8 Aug | 1985 | | Gravedona | Italy | Juniors | 98 | 15 | | Open | 49 | | | | |
| 8 | 6 - 12 Sept | 1986 | | Medemblik | Netherlands | Juniors | 126 | 17 | | Open | 63 | | | | |
| 9 | 18–25 July | 1987 | | Koper | Yugoslavia | Juniors | 116 | 14 | | Open | 58 | | | | |
| 10 | 21 - 28 Aug | 1988 | | Puck | Poland | U20 | 102 | 12 | | Open | 51 | | | | |
| 11 | - | 1989 | | Alicante | Spain | U20 | 98 | 11 | | Open | 49 | | | | |
| 12 | - | 1990 | | Paleon Faliron | France | U20 | 88 | 13 | | Open | 44 | | | | |
| 13 | 22-31 Aug | 1991 | | Damp | Germany | U20 | 136 | 16 | | Open | 68 | | | | |
| 14 | 16-24 Aug | 1992 | | Espoo | Finland | U20 | 88 | 15 | | Open | 44 | | | | |
| 15 | 21-29 Aug | 1993 | | Marina di Carrara | Italy | U20 | 122 | 18 | | Open | 61 | | | | |
| 16 | 10-17 Jul | 1994 | | Balatonfured | Hungary | U20 | 94 | 14 | | Open | 47 | | | | |
| 17 | 18-26 Aug | 1995 | | Warnemunde | Germany | U21 | 168 | 20 | | Open | 84 | | | | |
| 18 | 16-24 Aug | 1996 | | Puck | Poland | U21 | 190 | 21 | | Open | 95 | | | | |
| 19 | 16-24 Aug | 1997 | | Courseulles-sur-Mer | France | U22 | 158 | 20 | | Open | 79 | | | | |
| 20 | 15-23 Aug | 1998 | | Tallinn | Estonia | U22 | 86 | 14 | | Open | 43 | | | | |
| 21 | 8-14 Feb | 1999 | | Auckland | New Zealand | U22 | 44 | 9 | | Open | 22 | | | | |
| 22 | 19-27 Aug | 2000 | Segel-Club St. Moritz | Silvaplana | Switzerland | U22 | 216 | 20 | 2 | Open | 80 | 20 | 4 | 5 | |
| 23 | 26Aug -3Sep | 2001 | | Istanbul | Turkey | U22 | 80 | 17 | | Open | 40 | | | | |
| 24 | 2-10 Aug | 2002 | | Nieuwpoort | Netherlands | U22 | 126 | 17 | | Open | 63 | | | | |
| 25 | 28Aug -6Sep | 2003 | Burgenlandischer Yacht Club | Neusiedlersee | Austria | U22 | 150 | 21 | | Open | 75 | | | | |
| 26 | 20-28 Aug | 2004 | Fraglia Vela Riva | Riva del Garda | Italy | U22 | 238 | 25 | | Open | 119 | | | | |
| 27 | 25Jul -2Aug | 2005 | | St. Petersberg | Russia | U22 | 134 | 19 | | Open | 67 | | | | |
| 28 | 21-30 Jul | 2006 | Lubecker Yacht Club | Travemünde, Lübeck, Schleswig-Holstein | Germany | U22 | 242 | 28 | | Open | 121 | | | | |
| 29 | 21-29 Jul | 2007 | Yacht Club Port Bourgas | Port Bourgas | Bulgaria | U22 | 168 | 20 | | Open | 82 | | | | |
| 30 | 21-29 Jul | 2008 | | Gdynia | Poland | U22 | 128 | 25 | | Male & Mixed | 64 | | | | |
| 30 | 21-29 Jul | 2008 | | Gdynia | Poland | U22 | 50 | 15 | 3 | Female | - | 25 | - | - | |
| 31 | 10-18 Jul | 2009 | Nautical Club of Thessaloniki | Thessaloniki | Greece | U22 | 108 | 23 | 4 | Male & Mixed | | | | | |
| 31 | 10-18 Jul | 2009 | Nautical Club of Thessaloniki | Thessaloniki | Greece | U22 | 50 | 15 | 3 | Female | - | 25 | - | - | |
| 32 | 16-22 Dec | 2010 | Doha Sailing Club | Doha, Qatar | Qatar | U22 | 64 | 13 | 3 | Male & Mixed | | | | | |
| 32 | 16-22 Dec | 2010 | Doha Sailing Club | Doha, Qatar | Qatar | U22 | 32 | 8 | 2 | Female | - | 16 | - | - | |
| 33 | 20-28 Jul | 2011 | International Sailing Centre Medemblik | Medemblik | Netherlands | U22 | 120 | 26 | 5 | Male & Mixed | | | | | |
| 33 | 20-28 Jul | 2011 | International Sailing Centre Medemblik | Medemblik | Netherlands | U22 | 64 | 16 | 4 | Female | - | 32 | - | - | |
| 34 | 26Jan -3Feb | 2012 | Takapuna Boating Club | Auckland | New Zealand | U22 | 42 | 11 | 4 | Male & Mixed | | | | | |
| 34 | 26Jan -3Feb | 2012 | Takapuna Boating Club | Auckland | New Zealand | U22 | 20 | 7 | 3 | Female | - | 10 | - | - | |
| 35 | 27Jul -3Aug | 2013 | Societe des Regates Rochelaises | La Rochelle, Charente-Maritime | France | U22 | 118 | 24 | 4 | Male & Mixed | | | | | |
| 35 | 27Jul -3Aug | 2013 | Societe des Regates Rochelaises | La Rochelle, Charente-Maritime | France | U22 | 50 | 13 | 2 | Female | - | 25 | - | - | |
| 36 | 26Jun -3Jul | 2014 | Circolo Nautico Cervia | Milano Marittima | Italy | U22 | 92 | 16 | 4 | Male & Mixed | | | | | |
| 36 | 26Jun -3Jul | 2014 | Circolo Nautico Cervia | Milano Marittima | Italy | U22 | 46 | 13 | 2 | Female | - | 23 | - | - | |
| 37 | 24-31 Jul | 2015 | Nautical Club of Thessaloniki | Thessaloniki | Greece | U24 | 120 | 24 | 6 | Male & Mixed | | | | | |
| 37 | 24-31 Jul | 2015 | Nautical Club of Thessaloniki | Thessaloniki | Greece | U24 | 84 | 16 | 4 | Female | - | 42 | - | - | |
| 38 | 20-26 Jun | 2016 | Kieler Yacht Club | Kiel, Schleswig-Holstein | Germany | U24 | 100 | 21 | 5 | Male & Mixed | | | | | |
| 38 | 20-26 Jun | 2016 | Kieler Yacht Club | Kiel, Schleswig-Holstein | Germany | U24 | 60 | 12 | 2 | Female | - | 30 | - | - | |
| 39 | 26Aug -2Sep | 2017 | Enoshima Yacht Harbor | Enoshima | Japan | U24 | 76 | 10 | 4 | Male & Mixed | | | | | |
| 39 | 26Aug -2Sep | 2017 | Enoshima Yacht Harbor | Enoshima | Japan | U24 | 50 | 11 | 4 | Female | - | 25 | - | - | |
| 40 | 19-26 Aug | 2018 | Planet Sail Bracciano | Bracciano | Italy | U24 | 102 | 21 | 4 | Male & Mixed | | | | | |
| 40 | 19-26 Aug | 2018 | Planet Sail Bracciano | Bracciano | Italy | U24 | 56 | 11 | 4 | Female | - | 28 | - | - | |
| 41 | 30Jun -7Jul | 2019 | Jadralni Klub Pirat Portorož | Portorož | Slovenia | U24 | 106 | 19 | 2 | Male & Mixed | | | | | |
| 41 | 30Jun -7Jul | 2019 | Jadralni Klub Pirat Portorož | Portorož | Slovenia | U24 | 24 | 7 | 3 | Female | - | 12 | - | - | |
| N/A | 22-29 Aug | 2020 | | Gdynia | Poland | CANCELLED DUE TO COVID | | | | | | | | | |
| 42 | 11-18 Jul | 2021 | Yacht Club Sanremo | Sanremo | Italy | U25 | 84 | 16 | 4 | Mixed | - | - | 16 | 26 | |
| 42 | 11-18 Jul | 2021 | Yacht Club Sanremo | Sanremo | Italy | U25 | 18 | 6 | 3 | Male or Female | 7 | 2 | - | - | |
| 43 | 14-21 Aug | 2022 | Tihanyi Hajós Egylet | Lake Balaton | Hungary | U24 | 60 | 11 | 2 | Open | 5 | 0 | 11 | 14 | |
| 44 | 27Aug -3Sep | 2023 | | Nida | Lithuania | U24 | 78 | 18 | 2 | Mixed | - | - | 17 | 22 | |
| 45 | 6-13 Jul | 2024 | Bayramoglu Sailing and Watersports Club | Bayramoglu, Kocaeli | Turkey | U24 | 72 | 14 | 3 | Mixed | - | - | 18 | 18 | |
| 46 | 7-12 July | 2025 | Club Náutico Mar Menor | Los Alcázares | Spain | U24 | 84 | 16 | 3 | Mixed | - | - | 14 | 28 | |
| 47 | 13–17 July | 2026 | Marina Gdynia | Gdynia | Poland | U24 | 110 | 19 | 4 | Open | 3 | 0 | 17 | 35 | |

=== Junior Open ===
| Year | Gold | Silver | Bronze | Ref. |
|---|---|---|---|---|
| 1979 | Jörn Borowski (GER); Schmidt (GER) | Gianfranco Noe (ITA); Paolo Montefusco (ITA) | Tommaso Chieffi (ITA); Enrico Chieffi (ITA) | |
| 1980 | | | | |
| 1981 | Chircov (RUS); Bolgov (RUS) | Morgenstern (GER); Morgenstern (GER) | Dmitri Berezkin (RUS); Kutznetsov (RUS) | |
| 1982 | Berioskin (RUS); Kuztrud (RUS) | Magnus Lundgren (SWE); Urban Lagneus (SWE) | Bergström (SWE); Bergström (SWE) | |
| 1983 | Jorg Rettig (GER); Thomas Heldt (GER) | Andrea Mura (ITA); Paolo Brichetti (ITA) | Ralf Rudlaff (GER); Martin Richter (GER) | |
| 1984 | DDR 77; Ralf Rudlaff (GER); Martin Richter (GER) | DDR 11; Andreas Pape (GER); Nico Emos (GER) | SR 17; Alexej Joukov (RUS); Dimitri Rodomakin (RUS) | |
| 1985 | Jon Bilger (NZL); Jarrod Kriletich (NZL) | Nicola Ferrone (ITA); Fabio Ferrone (ITA) | Ronald Rensch (GER); Thomas Beutel (GER) | |
| 1986 | Sven Kaiser (GER); Dietmar Wendel (GER) | Andreas Pape (GER); Stephan Ruthen (GER) | Jon Bilger (NZL); Jarrod Kriletich (NZL) | |
| 1987 | Koniancic (YUG); Planinsic (YUG) | Antonaz (YUG); Glavina (YUG) | Jordi Calafat (ESP); Bellester (ESP) | |
| 1988 | Donald Lippert (GER); Roland Hensel (GER) | Ran Shental (ISR); Nir Shental (ISR) | Vasco Vascotto (ITA); Pietro Perelli (ITA) | |
| 1989 | Matteo Ivaldi (ITA); Michele Ivaldi (ITA) | Martinez (ESP); Farreny (ESP) | Del Felice (ITA); Predieri (ITA) | |
| 1990 | Michael Koch (GER); Stefan Theuerkauf (GER) | D. Martinez (ESP); A. Martinez (ESP) | Marc Audineau (FRA); Julien Farnarier (FRA) | |
| 1991 | Luis Martinez-Doreste (ESP); Juan-Luis Wood (ESP) | Michael Koch (GER); Holger Grande (GER) | Lorenzo Bodini (ITA); Marco Bodini (ITA) | |
| 1992 | Luis Martinez-Doreste (ESP); Juan Luis Wood (ESP) | Lincoln Fraser (NZL); Liam Newman (NZL) | Janne Uusi-Autti (FIN); Ville L„Hteinen (FIN) | |
| 1993 | I 4009; Alesandro Bonifacio (ITA); Mitja Gialuz (ITA) | POR 11; Pedro Rebelo De Andrade (POR); Frederico Champalimaud (POR) | ITA 4025; Riccardo Papa (ITA); Filippo Marini (ITA) | |
| 1994 | SLO 7 Jurica Tunjic (SLO); Mitja Petric (SLO) | ESP 1714; Gustavo Martinez (ESP); Dimas Wood (ESP) | POL 50; Tomasz Stanczyk (POL); Tomasz Jakubiak (POL) | |
| 1995 | ISR 21; Zeevi Kalach (ISR); Elad Ronen (ISR) | GER 4711; Sönke Boy (GER); Jens Ole Von Studnitz (GER) | GER 4721; Philipp Kadelbach (GER); Eric Anders (GER) | |
| 1996 | SLO 6 Miha Staut (SLO); Peter Habjan (SLO) | ITA 4155; Gabrio Zandona (ITA); Francesco Ivaldi (ITA) | POL 450; Adam Paszek (POL); Pawel Zarzecki (POL) | |
| 1997 | POR 22; Alvaro Marinho (POR); Miguel Nunes (POR) | ITA 4 Gabrio Zandona (ITA); Luca Simoncelli (ITA) | GRE 137; Alexander Tagaropoulos (GRE): Mavroma (GRE) | |
| 1998 | POL 5 Tomasz Stanczyk (POL); Tomasz Jakubiak (POL) | GER 4863; Lucas Zellmer (GER); Felix Krabbe (GER) | ESP 1712; Juan Jose Diaz (ESP); Octavio Rodriguez (ESP) | |
| 1999 | POL 5 Tomasz Stanczyk (POL); Tomasz Jakubiak (POL) | ISR 7 Gidon Kliger (ISR); Gal Ehud (ISR) | NZL 186; Rhys Johnston (NZL); Jamie Hunt (NZL) | |
| 2000 | ISR 7 Gidon Kliger (ISR); Udi Gal (ISR) | POL 515; Marcin Czajkowski (POL); Krzysztof Kierkowski (POL) | ESP 1713; Onan Barreiros (ESP); Angel Zubiria (ESP) | |
| 2001 | GRE 136; Panagiotis Mantis (GRE); Theodoros Polychronidis (GRE) | ISR12; Yosef Yogev (ISR); Amir Shahar (ISR) | GER4902; Stephan Ulrich (GER); Kai Gritzke (GER) | |
| 2002 | GRE 136; Panagiotis Mantis (GRE); Theodoros Polichronidis (GRE) | ITA 4290; Enrico Fonda (ITA); Pietro Zucchetti (ITA) | FRA 2618; Nicolas Charbonnier (FRA); Stephane Christidis (FRA) | |
| 2003 | CRO 83; Sime Fantela (CRO); Igor Marenic (CRO) | CRO 7 Ante Cesic (CRO); Ante Kujundzic (CRO) | NED 1059; Coen De Koning (NED); Wilco Stavenuiter (NED) | |
| 2004 | CRO 7 Ante Cesic (CRO); Ante Kujundzic (CRO) | POL 50; Piasecki Patryk (POL); Przybylak Jacek (POL) | CRO 83; Sime Fantela (CRO); Igor Marenic (CRO) | |
| 2005 | CRO 83; Sime Fantela (CRO); Igor Marenic (CRO) | GRE 182; Georgios Vasilas (GRE); Evangelos Mitakis (GRE) | POL 50; Patryk Piasecki (POL); Jacek Przybylak (POL) | |
| 2006 | ISR 9 Eyal Levine (ISR); Yam Amir (ISR) | CRO 83; Sime Fantela (CRO); Igor Marenic (CRO) | GBR 834; Luke Patience (GBR); Twiggy Grube (GBR) | |
| 2007 | CRO 83; Sime Fantela (CRO); Igor Marenic (CRO) | GRE 7 Georgios Vasilas (GRE); Evangelos Mitakis (GRE) | RUS 11; Artem Basalkin (RUS); Maxim Sheremetyev (RUS) | |
| 2008-21 | NOT INCLUDED | | | |
| 2022 | FRA 72; Matisse Pacaud (FRA); Lucie De Gennes (FRA) | POL 7 Agnieszka Pawlowska (POL); Bartlomiej Szlija (POL) | AUT 463; Rosa Donner (AUT); Sebastian Slivon (AUT) | |
| 2023-25 | NOT INCLUDED | | | |
| 2026 | Lisa Vucetti (ITA); Vittorio Bonifacio (ITA) | Roy Levy (ISR); Ariel Gal (ISR) | Lomane Valade (FRA); Julien Bunel (FRA) | |

=== Junior Male and Mixed ===
| Year | Gold | Silver | Bronze | Ref. |
|---|---|---|---|---|
| 2008 | NED 77; Steven Le Fevre (NED); Steven Krol (NED) | ISR 9 Lior Lavie (ISR); Yam Amir (ISR) | ITA 4 Luca Dubbini (ITA); Roberto Dubbini (ITA) | |
| 2009 | FRA 27; Sofian Bouvet (FRA); Jeremie Mion (FRA) | GER 4988; Ferdinand Gerz (GER); Tobias Bolduan (GER) | ITA 4 Luca Dubbini (ITA); Roberto Dubbini (ITA) | |
| 2010 | FRA 1 Sofian Bouvet (FRA); Jeremie Mion (FRA) | AUT 1 David Bargehr (AUT); Lukas Mahr (AUT) | ITA 1 Simon Sivitz Kosuta (ITA); Jas Farneti (ITA) | |
| 2011 | SWE 345; Nicklas Dackhammar (SWE); Fredrik Bergström (SWE) | FRA 8 Kévin Peponnet (FRA); Julien Lebrun (FRA) | GBR 852; Philip Sparks (GBR); David Kohler (GBR) | |
| 2012 | 29; Simon Sivitz Kosuta (ITA); Jas Farneti (ITA) | 206; James Turner (NZL); Finn Drummond (NZL) | 77; Sacha Pelisson (FRA); Nicholas Rossi (FRA) | |
| 2013 | ESP 44; Jordi Xammar (ESP); Joan Herp (ESP) | GER 15; Julian Autenrieth (GER); Matti Cipra (GER) | ISR 17; Gal Cohen (ISR); Dan Froyliche (ISR) | |
| 2014 | ESP 44; Jordi Xammar (ESP); Joan Herp (ESP) | FRA 76; Guillaume Pirouelle (FRA); Valentin Sipan (FRA) | GER 13; Malte Winkel (GER); Matti Cipra (GER) | |
| 2015 | FRA 76; Guillaume Pirouelle (FRA); Valentin Sipan (FRA) | GER 13; Malte Winkel (GER); Matti Cipra (GER) | ITA 757; GIACOMO FERRARI (ITA); GIULIO CALABRO (ITA) | |
| 2016 | JPN 4562; Keiju Okada (JPN); Naoya Kimura (JPN) | ESP 1 David Charles Vila (ESP); Alex Charles (ESP) | JPN 4585; Daichi Takayama (JPN); Akira Takayanagi (JPN) | |
| 2018 | FRA 79; Hippolyte Machetti (FRA); Sidoine Dantès (FRA) | ITA 757; Giacomo Ferrari (ITA); Giulio Calabro (ITA) | HUN 1 Balázs Gyapjas (HUN); Zsombor Gyapjas (HUN) | |
| 2019 | Giacomo Ferrari (ITA); Giulio Calabrò (ITA) | Daniel Gōttlich (GER); Linus Klasen (GER) | Lucas Schlüter (GER); Frederick Eichhorst (GER) | |
| 2020; Onwards | Not Held | | | |

=== Junior Female ===
| year | Gold | Silver | Bronze | Ref. |
|---|---|---|---|---|
| 2008 | GBR 835; Hannah Mills (GBR); Katrlna Hughes (GBR) | ESP 696; Tara Pacheco (ESP); Berta Betanzos (ESP) | SWE 33; Lisa Erlcson (SWE); Astrid Gabrielsson (SWE) | |
| 2009 | ESP 696; Rijnsoever Van Pacheco (ESP); Berta Betanzos (ESP) | ISR 311; Gil Cohen (ISR); Dana Mamriev (ISR) | GER 4983; Annika Bochmann (GER); Anika Lorenz (GER) | |
| 2010 | GER 9 Victoria Jurczok (GER); Josephine Bach (GER) | GER 8 Annika Bochmann (GER); Anika Lorenz (GER) | JPN 3 GOTO Saki (JPN); Hiromi Nishiyama (JPN) | |
| 2011 | GER 72; Annika Bochmann (GER); Anika Lorenz (GER) | GBR 812; Anna Burnet (GBR); Flora Stewart (GBR) | AUS 380; Sasha Ryan (AUS); Chelsea Hall (AUS) | |
| 2012 | NED 74; Afrodite Kyranakou (NED); Jeske Kisters (NED) | GER 72; Annika Bochmann (GER); Elisabeth Panuschka (GER) | GBR 853; Anna Burnet (GBR); Flora Stewart (GBR) | |
| 2013 | FRA 39; Maelenn Lemaitre (FRA); Aloise Retornaz (FRA) | UKR 93; Anna Kyselova (UKR); Anastasiya Krasko (UKR) | GER 24; Nadine Bohm (GER); Karoline Gottzer (GER) | |
| 2014 | FRA 39; Maëlenn Lemaitre (FRA); Aloïse Retornaz (FRA) | GBR 838; Jess Lavery (GBR); Megan Brickwood (GBR) | ISR 11; Noya Bar-Am (ISR); Rimon Shoshan (ISR) | |
| 2015 | ITA 74; Benedetta Di Salle (ITA); Alessandra Dubbini (ITA) | GRE 21; Maria Bozi (GRE); Rafailina Klonaridou (GRE) | GBR 838; Jessica Lavery (GBR); Megan Brickwood (GBR) | |
| 2016 | ESP 18; Silvia Mas Depares (ESP); Paula Barcelo Martin (ESP) | FRA 7 Marina Lefort (FRA); Lara Granier (FRA) | GRE 21; Maria Bozi (GRE); Rafailina Klonaridou (GRE) | |
| 2017 | ESP 18; Silvia Mas Depares (ESP); Paula Barcelo Martin (ESP) | AUS 5 Nia Jerwood (AUS); Monique De Vries (AUS) | ITA 33; Ilaria Paternoster (ITA); Bianca Caruso (ITA) | |
| 2018 | ITA 74; Benedetta Di Salle (ITA); Alessandra Dubbini (ITA) | GER 20; Theres Dahnke (GER); Birte Winkel (GER) | FRA 19; Paola Amar (FRA); Marine Riou (FRA) | |
| 2019 | Luise Wanser (GER); Helena Wanser (GER) | Paola Amar (FRA); Marine Riou (FRA) | Theres DAHNKE (GER); Birte WINKEL (GER) | |
| 2021 | CANCELLED DUE TO COVID | | | |
| 2021; Onwards | Not raced as a stand alone fleet | | | |

=== Junior Mixed ===
| Year | Gold | Silver | Bronze | Ref. |
|---|---|---|---|---|
| 2021 | ITA 5 Marco Gradoni (ITA); Alessandra Dubbini (ITA) | ISR 121; Tal Sade (ISR); Noa Lasry (ISR) | FRA 72; Matisse Pacaud (FRA); Lucie De Gennes (FRA) | |
| 2022 | Open Event Only Held | | | |
| 2023 | FRA 72; Matisse Pacaud (FRA); Lucie De Gennes (FRA) | ISR 121; Roy Levy (ISR); Ariel Gal (ISR) | FRA 10; Manon Pennanéac'H (FRA); Pierre Williot (FRA) | |
| 2024 | Matisse Pacaud (FRA); Lucie de Gennes (FRA) | Lomane Valade (FRA); Julien Bunel (FRA) | Manon Pennaneac'h (FRA); Pierre Williot (FRA) | |
| 2025 | Roy Levy (ISR); Ariel Gal (ISR) | Lomane Valade (FRA); Julien Bunel (FRA) | Livia Ciampinelli (ITA); Nicola Brunotti (ITA) | |
| 2026 | Open Event Only Held | | | |
