= 2017 470 World Championships =

Event title
- Edition: 47th
- Host: Nautical Club of Thessaloniki

Event details
- Venue: Thessaloniki, Greece
- Dates: 7–15 July 2017
- Titles: 2

Competitors
- Competitors: 264
- Competing nations: 32

The 2017 470 World Championships were held in Thessaloniki, Greece 7–15 July 2017. It was organised by the Nautical Club of Thessaloniki.

== Summary ==
In the men's event, Mathew Belcher and Will Ryan of Australia won ahead of Anton Dahlberg and Fredrik Bergström of Sweden through a decisive win in the medal race. David Bargehr and Lukas Mähr of Austria took the bronze. Belcher recorded his seventh World championship title and Ryan his fourth.

In the women's event, Agnieszka Skrzypulec and Irmina Gliszczyńska of Poland won the gold. Hannah Mills and Eilidh McIntyre of Great Britain took the silver medals and Tina Mrak and Veronika Macarol of Slovenia took the bronze.

== Results ==
=== Men's 470 ===
Results of individual races
Pos	Crew	Country	I	II	III	IV	V	VI	VII	VIII	IX	X	XI	MR	Tot	Pts
Gold medal	Mathew Belcher; Will Ryan	Australia	4	4	1	4	1	9	1	10^{†}	7	1	4	2	48	38
Silver medal	Anton Dahlberg; Fredrik Bergström	Sweden	1	2	1	1	2	2	3	18	4	21^{†}	1	12	68	47
Bronze medal	David Bargehr; Lukas Mähr	Austria	3	3	4	1	3	25^{†}	2	4	17	4	19	18	103	78
4	Hippolyte Machetti; Sidoine Dantès	France	5	8	5	3	1	31^{†}	14	19	12	2	12	4	116	85
5	Deniz Çınar; Ateş Çınar	Turkey	11	2	3	7	8	1	UFD 37^{†}	15	6	9	6	OCS 22	127	90
6	Giacomo Ferrari; Giulio Calabrò	Italy	1	13	15	2	30^{†}	11	5	1	3	6	23	14	124	94
7	Stuart McNay; David Hughes	United States	18^{†}	1	5	7	4	15	15	5	8	7	13	16	114	96
8	Xu Zangjun; Wang Chao	China	2	8	7	11	4	30^{†}	9	11	14	14	9	10	129	99
9	Paul Snow-Hansen; Daniel Willcox	New Zealand	3	7	6	9	3	8	UFD 37^{†}	7	13	10	27	8	138	101
10	Panagiotis Mantis; Pavlos Kagialis	Greece	10	4	2	4	12	23	21	26^{†}	1	12	7	6	128	102
11	Kazuto Doi; Naoya Kimura	Japan	8	12	6	10	12	14	20	3	20^{†}	11	2		118	98
12	Malte Winkel; Matti Cipra	Germany	6	5	18	9	7	10	22^{†}	8	15	8	15		123	101
13	Naoki Ichino; Takashi Hasegawa	Japan	13	UFD 37^{†}	9	8	24	6	8	17	11	3	5		141	104
14	Carl-Fredrik Fock; Marcus Dackhammar	Sweden	5	11	10	2	15	3	10	16	19	27^{†}	14		132	105
15	Jordi Xammar; Nicolás Rodríguez	Spain	UFD 37^{†}	3	7	5	18	5	12	20	18	23	11		159	122
16	Sho Kaminoki; Taisei Hikida	Japan	19	19	9	6	6	7	7	28	29^{†}	RDG 17.8	RDG 17.8		165.6	136.6
17	Simon Diesch; Philipp Autenrieth	Germany	20	5	4	11	17	26	18	23	BFD 37^{†}	5	8		174	137
18	Tetsuya Isozaki; Akira Takayanagi	Japan	27	UFD 37^{†}	17	10	6	16	16	2	9	20	21		181	144
19	Ryo Imamura; Jumpei Hokazono	Japan	2	23	19	19	19	12	13	13	BFD 37^{†}	24	3		184	147
20	Chris Charlwood; Josh Dawson	Australia	11	10	10	14	23	4	6	UFD 37^{†}	26	16	30		187	150
21	Daichi Takayama; Kimihiko Imamura	Japan	23	1	11	UFD 37^{†}	27	19	31	6	5	19	17		196	159
22	Balázs Gyapjas; Zsombor Gyapjas	Hungary	6	26	16	16	11	27	11	25	BFD 37^{†}	13	10		198	161
23	Nitai Hasson; Tal Harari	Israel	10	24	12	6	8	13	19	22	27	29^{†}	25		195	166
24	Vasilis Papoutsoglou; Ioannis Orfanos	Greece	17	6	8	8	13	28	25	21	BFD 37^{†}	25	18		206	169
25	Pavel Sozykin; Denis Gribanov	Russia	9	UFD 37^{†}	3	17	20	24	30	29	2	18	22		211	174
26	Navee Thamsoontorn; Nut Butmarasri	Thailand	22	9	27	20	10	20	4	31	BFD 37^{†}	17	16		213	176
27	Asenathi Jim; Sibu Sizatu	South Africa	4	6	12	18	17	32	27	14	25	22	34^{†}		211	177
28	Maor Abu; Yoav Rooz	Israel	12	22	2	UFD 37^{†}	5	17	26	24	16	28	26		215	178
29	Lucas Calabrese; Ian MacDiarmid	United States	12	17	13	UFD 37^{†}	9	21	28	9	23	30	20		219	182
30	Mustafa Sergen Birincioglu; Firat Sahin	Turkey	26	22	8	20	7	22	UFD 37^{†}	30	10	15	32		229	192
31	Jules Ducelier; Clement Michel	France	20	14	19	17	10	BFD 37^{†}	24	12	24	26	28		231	194
32	Martin Wrigley; James Taylor	Great Britain	7	16	18	5	19	18	23	UFD 37^{†}	28	31	31		233	196
33	Nikolaus Kampelmühler; Thomas Czajka	Austria	15	13	20	12	16	29	17	UFD 37^{†}	21	33	24		237	200
34	Faizal Norizan; Syukri Aziz	Malaysia	21	9	15	26	2	33	29	32	22	32	33^{†}		254	221
35	Borys Shvets; Pavlo Matsuyev	Ukraine	16	7	16	22	DSQ 37	BFD 37	UFD 37^{†}	27	BFD 37	DSQ 37	29		302	265
36	Matteo Capurro; Matteo Puppo	Italy	8	UFD 37	14	16	21	RET 37	RET 37	DNC 37^{†}	RET 37	RET 37	RET 37		318	281
37	Jose Manuel Ruiz; Fernando Dávila	Spain	15	18	17	30^{†}	14	4	5	1	8	1	6		119	89
38	Kosuke Demichi; Taiga Nakagawa	Japan	19	29^{†}	23	13	9	1	2	4	1	9	16		126	97
39	Sosaku Koizumi; Tomoya Noda	Japan	7	27^{†}	14	21	26	13	3	7	5	12	2		137	110
40	Maciej Sapiejka; Adam Krefft	Poland	14	10	22	24	30^{†}	9	15	8	2	11	3		148	118
41	Emerson Villena; Lester Troy Tayong	Philippines	27^{†}	23	13	25	5	7	26	5	6	13	13		163	136
42	Wiley Rogers; Jack Parkin	United States	21	20	25	19	20	14	10	BFD 37^{†}	3	2	7		178	141
43	Kilian Wagen; Gregoire Siegwart	Switzerland	26	15	23	15	11	3	1	DNC 37	BFD 37^{†}	5	14		187	150
44	Kim Chang-ju; Kim Ji-hoon	South Korea	9	DSQ 37^{†}	11	UFD 37	18	12	11	BFD 37	4	8	9		193	156
45	Vasileios Gourgiotis; Orestis Batsis	Greece	22	11	28	18	28	2	19	3	BFD 37^{†}	16	15		199	162
46	Park Gun-woo; Cho Sung-min	South Korea	14	21	27	24	25	18	7	BFD 37^{†}	9	3	24		209	172
47	Konstantinos Kazantzis; Ioannis Dellios	Greece	28	14	25	22	33^{†}	16	8	15	13	20	18		212	179
48	Yves Mermod; Cyril Schüpbach	Switzerland	28	25	26	26	14	11	12	BFD 37^{†}	16	15	10		220	183
49	Yehor Samarin; Denys Osliak	Ukraine	17	24	22	21	31	8	20	9	BFD 37^{†}	25	8		222	185
50	Alexandre Demange; Aurelien Barthelemy	France	18	25	26	29	22	10	17	BFD 37^{†}	10	18	11		223	186
51	Arnaud Herail; Paco Lepoutre	France	31	21	21	14	16	25	14	BFD 37	BFD 37^{†}	4	4		224	187
52	Kamil Cesarski; Dominik Janowczyk	Poland	16	15	30	13	31	6	18	BFD 37	BFD 37^{†}	17	5		225	188
53	David Charles; Alex Charles	Spain	13	28	DNC 37^{†}	3	DNE 37	DNE 37	DNE 37	2	BFD 37	7	1		239	202
54	Ido Bilik; Ofek Shalgi	Israel	25	19	24	23	13	UFD 37	4	BFD 37	BFD 37^{†}	14	12		245	208
55	Georgios Karadimas; Nikolaos Georgakopoulos	Greece	29	31	30	12	22	22	9	17	BFD 37^{†}	19	17		245	208
56	Tjorben Studt; Hjalte Studt	Germany	30	17	20	25	23	5	21	19	BFD 37^{†}	28	21		246	209
57	Thodoris Chatzimpaloglou; Michalis Michailidis	Greece	34	30	33	28	15	19	6	11	BFD 37^{†}	22	20		255	218
58	Nikolaos Brilakis; Ioannis Eleftherios Kritikos	Greece	23	29	29	31	26	17	13	18	BFD 37^{†}	6	26		255	218
59	David Biedermann; Jann Schuepbach	Switzerland	29	31	34	UFD 37^{†}	29	21	16	14	7	10	28		256	219
60	Max Schuberth; Silas Oettinghaus	Germany	30	18	21	29	21	28	25	10	BFD 37^{†}	21	22		262	225
61	Botond Litkey; Tamás Szamódy	Hungary	25	26	28	27	32^{†}	27	22	13	15	23	31		269	237
62	Michalis Karagiannis-Zenetzidakis; Panagiotis Kardakaris	Greece	24	20	33	32	27	29	29	16	11	35^{†}	33		289	254
63	Daniel Ian Toh; Xavier Ng	Singapore	32	33	32	23	25	26	27	6	BFD 37^{†}	29	29		299	262
64	Sui Lun Tse; Ho Yin Chik	Hong Kong	UFD 37	27	29	27	29	15	24	BFD 37	BFD 37^{†}	27	19		308	271
65	Prince Noble; Sudhakar Reddy	India	35^{†}	34	31	28	34	30	28	23	17	26	25		311	276
66	Pushparajan Muttu; Sarad Chandra Singha	India	33	12	31	UFD 37^{†}	36	31	23	12	BFD 37	32	32		316	279
67	Vagelis Dolianitis; Giannis Dolianitis	Greece	32	30	36	34	32	23	DNC 37^{†}	21	14	34	27		320	283
68	Thomas Ponthieu; Quentin Paturle	France	24	16	24	15	24	RET 37	RET 37	RET 37^{†}	RET 37	RET 37	RET 37		325	288
69	Ioannis Giannopoulos; Georgios Zouganelis	Greece	31	28	32	33	28	20	32	20	BFD 37^{†}	30	34		325	288
70	Michael Melidonis; Petros Konstantinidis	Greece	36	35	DNF 37^{†}	30	35	33	33	22	12	31	35		339	302
71	Kimonas Ishakis; Pavlos Kazakos	Greece	34	32	35	BFD 37^{†}	33	24	31	24	BFD 37	33	23		343	306
72	Jonathan Martinetti; Francisco Almeida	Ecuador	33	32	34	BFD 37	34	32	30	BFD 37	BFD 37^{†}	24	30		360	323

Legend: – Qualified for medal race(s); BFD – Black flag disqualification; DNC – Did not come to the starting area; DNF – Did not finish; DSQ – Disqualified; RDG – Redress given; UFD – "U" flag disqualification;

=== Women's 470 ===
Results of individual races
Pos	Crew	Country	I	II	III	IV	V	VI	VII	VIII	IX	X	XI	MR	Tot	Pts
Gold medal	Agnieszka Skrzypulec; Irmina Gliszczyńska	Poland	3	3	3	2	2	2	3	3	19^{†}	3	4	14	61	42
Silver medal	Hannah Mills; Eilidh McIntyre	Great Britain	1	1	1	5	3	14^{†}	9	11	1	6	6	4	62	48
Bronze medal	Tina Mrak; Veronika Macarol	Slovenia	3	1	1	3	14	16^{†}	7	5	6	1	9	16	82	66
4	Afrodite Zegers; Anneloes van Veen	Netherlands	4	11	3	13^{†}	1	11	10	6	2	2	5	20	88	75
5	Bárbara Cornudella; Sara López	Spain	8	6	7	4	12	3	5	7	7	UFD 31^{†}	11	8	109	78
6	Silvia Mas; Patricia Cantero	Spain	2	8	20^{†}	1	9	8	8	17	4	8	13	2	100	80
7	Chen Shasha; Huang Xufeng	China	5	3	9	1	5	10	18	18	8	9	23^{†}	6	115	92
8	Amy Seabright; Anna Carpenter	Great Britain	2	5	2	DSQ 31^{†}	8	6	23	19	10	7	3	10	126	95
9	Linda Fahrni; Maja Siegenthaler	Switzerland	13	2	13	14	2	1	1	9	13	17	DNF 31^{†}	12	128	97
10	Maria Bozi; Rafailina Klonaridou	Greece	7	4	14	6	3	28^{†}	2	26	3	16	8	18	135	107
11	Wang Xiaoli; Gao Haiyang	China	11	2	2	7	4	4	16	16	26	UFD 31^{†}	12		131	100
12	Wei Mengxi; Ping Zhang	China	1	10	16	14	10	5	6	BFD 31^{†}	5	11	26		135	104
13	Nia Jerwood; Monique de Vries	Australia	13	11	6	6	12	24	4	BFD 31^{†}	9	13	10		139	108
14	Cassandre Blandin; Aloïse Retornaz	France	4	10	4	13	16	13	28^{†}	14	12	26	1		141	113
15	Frederike Loewe; Anna Markfort	Germany	8	7	10	10	14	26^{†}	15	10	17	5	17		139	113
16	Elena Berta; Sveva Carraro	Italy	15	7	RDG 12	10	16	20	17	2	11	12	22^{†}		144	122
17	Sofía Toro; Ángela Pumariega	Spain	12	4	12	12	9	9	19	21	15	22^{†}	14		149	127
18	Noya Bar-Am; Nina Amir	Israel	9	16	9	4	5	18	12	20	21	21^{†}	19		154	133
19	Nadine Boehm; Ann-Christin Goliass	Germany	10	19	5	DSQ 31^{†}	7	17	25	1	25	23	2		165	134
20	Jess Lavery; Flora Stewart	Great Britain	6	18	10	15	13	7	13	13	27	18	27^{†}		167	140
21	Benedetta Di Salle; Alessandra Dubbini	Italy	10	18	BFD 31^{†}	5	15	22	14	15	18	10	16		174	143
22	Carrie Smith; Jaime Ryan	Australia	16	15	7	12	17	19	27	BFD 31^{†}	14	4	21		183	152
23	Jiang Xinyu; Shen Xinyu	China	22	5	12	15	6	23	22	8	23	24^{†}	20		180	156
24	Tsuf Zamet; Noa Lasry	Israel	5	22	11	3	13	30	21	22	16	UFD 31^{†}	15		189	158
25	Misaki Tanaka; Ayano Kudo	Japan	14	25	16	2	4	21	30^{†}	4	24	25	25		190	160
26	Jennifer Poret; Camille Hautefaye	France	9	17	5	11	15	12	26	BFD 31^{†}	29	15	24		194	163
27	Gu Min; Huang Lizhu	China	6	24	11	9	18	27^{†}	24	25	20	20	7		191	164
28	Tara Pacheco; Paula Barceló	Spain	14	13	BFD 31^{†}	17	6	15	29	12	28	14	18		197	166
29	Alisa Kirilyuk; Anzhelika Cherniakhovskaia	Russia	7	9	8	8	22	29	20	23	22	19	DNC 31^{†}		198	167
30	Gil Cohen; Stav Brokman	Israel	11	6	4	DSQ 31	RDG 13	25	11	24	DNC 31	DNC 31^{†}	DNC 31		218	187
31	Fabienne Oster; Anastasiya Krasko	Germany	UFD 31^{†}	15	DSQ 31	11	7	5	1	4	7	2	2		116	85
32	Yahel Wallach; Shahar Tibi	Israel	18	19	15	20	1	1	2	BFD 31^{†}	6	1	15		129	98
33	Marina Lefort; Lara Granier	France	26	28^{†}	19	18	8	2	4	8	1	16	9		139	111
34	Ilaria Paternoster; Bianca Caruso	Italy	12	14	23	16	19	12	UFD 31^{†}	6	3	7	1		144	113
35	Luise Wanser; Helena Wanser	Germany	17	12	22^{†}	21	18	17	7	1	4	12	4		135	113
36	Constanze Stolz; Anna Reinsberg	Germany	18	17	8	19	17	22^{†}	12	16	10	9	3		151	129
37	Mano Udagawa; Yurie Seki	Japan	17	21	21	8	21^{†}	4	20	15	15	5	5		152	131
38	Dimitra Pagida; Alina Stratigiou	Greece	16	20	17	16	23^{†}	8	6	19	9	10	14		158	135
39	Olivia Bergström; Lovisa Karlsson	Sweden	19	13	18	20	25^{†}	15	9	3	23	3	13		161	136
40	Aikaterini Tavoulari; Nikoletta-Efstathia Papageorgiou	Greece	27	25	BFD 31^{†}	22	11	11	3	7	5	22	6		170	139
41	Theres Dahnke; Birte Winkel	Germany	21	12	RET 31^{†}	7	19	6	10	BFD 31	2	17	20		176	145
42	Nuraisyah Jamil; Ashikin Sayed	Malaysia	20	8	BFD 31^{†}	9	23	3	UFD 31	9	13	4	25		176	145
43	Antonina Marciniak; Julia Oleksiuk	Poland	22	23	21	DSQ 31^{†}	11	14	11	21	8	8	12		182	151
44	Beste Kaynakçı; Simay Aslan	Turkey	15	DSQ 31	6	RDG 17.3	RDG 17.3	7	5	BFD 31	16	DSQ 31^{†}	7		183.6	152.6
45	Nadja Horwitz; Trinidad González	Chile	19	22	18	18	22^{†}	10	8	11	17	11	19		175	153
46	Theresa Löffler; Lena Stückl	Germany	25	16	23	23	20	21	UFD 31^{†}	2	18	6	8		193	162
47	Yuuri Yamamoto; Yuri Saito	Japan	24	26^{†}	14	17	21	13	18	17	14	18	17		199	173
48	Paola Amar; Pauline Fauroux	France	24	9	19	24	26	16	UFD 31^{†}	14	11	24	18		216	185
49	Yuki Hayashi; Chika Nishidai	Japan	23	14	20	26	25	19	15	13	29^{†}	20	21		225	196
50	Dana Tavener; Katherine Shannon	Australia	23	27	15	25	28^{†}	23	16	18	28	14	10		227	199
51	Anna Kyselova; Anastasiia Synhaievska	Ukraine	21	21	17	24	10	RET 31^{†}	RDG 25.3	20	24	21	16		230.3	199.3
52	He Xian; Zhou Yan	China	UFD 31^{†}	23	13	19	24	26	UFD 31	10	22	13	27		239	208
53	Lola Billy; Emma Guevel	France	UFD 31^{†}	26	22	21	27	9	19	BFD 31	12	25	23		246	215
54	Shelley White; Amelia Catt	Australia	28	20	24	28	27	20	14	BFD 31^{†}	25	19	11		247	216
55	Jeanine Speelman; Marchien Speelman	Netherlands	20	24	UFD 31^{†}	23	26	24	13	DSQ 31	19	15	26		252	221
56	Narisara Satta; Nichapa Waiwai	Thailand	DNC 31^{†}	DNC 31	24	22	24	DSQ 31	24	12	20	23	22		264	233
57	Elisa Yukie Yokoyama; Cheryl Teo	Singapore	DNC 31^{†}	DNC 31	DNC 31	DNC 31	DNC 31	18	17	5	21	DNC 31	DNC 31		278	247
58	Ramya Saravanan; Aishwarya Chezhiyan	India	29^{†}	27	25	27	29	27	21	23	26	27	24		285	256
59	Jerene Durana; Alaiza Mae Belmonte	Philippines	25	28	25	25	29	28	22	22	30^{†}	28	29		291	261
60	Tammy Holden; Lea Smit	South Africa	30	29	26	26	28	25	23	BFD 31^{†}	27	26	28		299	268

Legend: – Qualified for medal race(s); BFD – Black flag disqualification; DNC – Did not come to the starting area; DNF – Did not finish; DSQ – Disqualified; RDG – Redress given; UFD – "U" flag disqualification;
