= 2018 Sailing World Cup =

Event title
- Edition: 11th
- Dates: 15 October 2017 – 10 June 2018
- Yachts: 470, 49er, 49er FX, Finn, Laser, Laser Radial, Nacra 17, RS:X

The 2018 Sailing World Cup is a series of regattas staged during the 2017–18 season. The series features sailing classes which are currently included on the Summer Olympics programme.

== Regattas ==
2018 regattas

Date	Regatta	City	Country
15–22 October 2017	Sailing World Cup Gamagōri	Gamagōri	Japan
21–28 January 2018	Sailing World Cup Miami	Miami	United States
22–29 April 2018	Sailing World Cup Hyères	Hyères	France
3–10 June 2018	Sailing World Cup Final	Marseille	France

== Results ==
=== Men's 470 ===
Regatta	Winners	Country	Ref
Gamagōri	Mathew Belcher; Will Ryan	Australia	
Miami	Luke Patience; Chris Grube	Great Britain	

=== Women's 470 ===
Regatta	Winners	Country	Ref
Gamagōri	Agnieszka Skrzypulec; Irmina Gliszczyńska	Poland	
Miami	Tina Mrak; Veronika Macarol	Slovenia	

=== Men's 49er ===
Regatta	Winners	Country	Ref
Gamagōri	Dylan Fletcher-Scott; Stuart Bithell	Great Britain	
Miami	Dylan Fletcher-Scott; Stuart Bithell	Great Britain	

=== Women's 49er FX ===
Regatta	Winners	Country	Ref
Gamagōri	Victoria Travascio; María Sol Branz	Argentina	
Miami	Victoria Jurczok; Anika Lorenz	Germany	

=== Men's Finn ===
Regatta	Winner	Country	Ref
Miami	Giles Scott	Great Britain	

=== Men's Laser ===
Regatta	Winner	Country	Ref
Gamagōri	Sam Meech	New Zealand	
Miami	Tom Burton	Australia	

=== Women's Laser Radial ===
Regatta	Winner	Country	Ref
Gamagōri	Anne-Marie Rindom	Denmark	
Miami	Alison Young	Great Britain	

=== Mixed Nacra 17 ===
Regatta	Winners	Country	Ref
Miami	Jason Waterhouse; Lisa Darmanin	Australia	

=== Men's RS:X ===
Regatta	Winner	Country	Ref
Gamagōri	Paweł Tarnowski	Poland	
Miami	Louis Giard	France	

=== Women's RS:X ===
Regatta	Winner	Country	Ref
Gamagōri	Hei Man H V Chan	Hong Kong	
Miami	Hélène Noesmoen	France	
