= 2017 Sailing World Cup =

2017 ISAF Sailing World Cup
Event title
- Edition: 10th
- Dates: 22 January – 11 June
- Yachts: 2.4 Metre, 470, 49er, 49er FX, Finn, Formula Kite, Laser, Laser Radial, Nacra 17, RS:X

The 2017 ISAF Sailing World Cup was a series of sailing regattas staged during 2017 season. The series features boats which feature at the Olympics and Paralympics.

== Regattas ==
2017 regattas

Date	Regatta	City	Country
22–29 January 2017	Sailing World Cup Miami	Miami	United States
23–30 April 2017	Sailing World Cup Hyères	Hyères	France
4–11 June 2017	Sailing World Cup Final	Santander	Spain

== Results ==
=== 2.4 Metre ===
Regatta	Winner	Country	Ref
Hyères	Damien Seguin	France	

=== Men's 470 ===
Regatta	Winners	Country	Ref
Miami	Stuart McNay; David Hughes	United States	
Hyères	Mathew Belcher; William Ryan	Australia	
Santander	Panagiotis Mantis; Pavlos Kagialis	Greece	

=== Women's 470 ===
Regatta	Winners	Country	Ref
Miami	Afrodite Zegers; Anneloes van Veen	Netherlands	
Hyères	Afrodite Zegers; Anneloes van Veen	Netherlands	
Santander	Hannah Mills; Eilidh McIntyre	Great Britain	

=== Men's 49er ===
Regatta	Winners	Country	Ref
Miami	Dylan Fletcher-Scott; Stuart Bithell	Great Britain	
Hyères	Diego Botín le Chever; Iago López	Spain	
Santander	James Peters; Fynn Sterritt	Great Britain	

=== Women's 49er FX ===
Regatta	Winners	Country	Ref
Miami	Martine Grael; Kahena Kunze	Brazil	
Hyères	Martine Grael; Kahena Kunze	Brazil	
Santander	Martine Grael; Kahena Kunze	Brazil	

=== Men's Finn ===
Regatta	Winner	Country	Ref
Hyères	Alican Kaynar	Turkey	
Santander	Ben Cornish	United Kingdom	

=== Men's Formula Kite ===
Regatta	Winner	Country	Ref
Hyères	Nicolas Parlier	France	
Santander	Nicolas Parlier	France	

=== Men's Laser ===
Regatta	Winner	Country	Ref
Miami	Jean-Baptiste Bernaz	France	
Hyères	Pavlos Kontides	Cyprus	
Santander	Jean-Baptiste Bernaz	France	

=== Women's Laser Radial ===
Regatta	Winner	Country	Ref
Miami	Vasileia Karachaliou	Greece	
Hyères	Evi Van Acker	Belgium	
Santander	Evi Van Acker	Belgium	

=== Mixed Nacra 17 ===
Regatta	Winners	Country	Ref
Miami	Ben Saxton; Nicola Groves	Great Britain	
Hyères	Fernando Echávarri; Tara Pacheco	Spain	
Santander	Fernando Echavarri; Tara Pacheco	Spain	

=== Men's RS:X ===
Regatta	Winner	Country	Ref
Miami	Louis Giard	France	
Hyères	Louis Giard	France	
Santander	Kiran Badloe	Netherlands	

=== Women's RS:X ===
Regatta	Winner	Country	Ref
Miami	Lu Yunxiu	China	
Hyères	Zofia Noceti-Klepacka	Poland	
Santander	Patrícia Freitas	Brazil	
