= Matthew Allen =

Matthew Allen may refer to:

- Matthew Allen, footballer in 2003–04 Aston Villa F.C. season
- Matthew Allen, Australian footballer in 2015 AFL draft
- Matthew Allen, MP for Weymouth and Melcombe Regis (UK Parliament constituency)
- Matthew Allen, musician in Klein Competition
- Matthew Allen, cyclist in 1996 UCI Track Cycling World Cup Classics
- Matthew Allen, sailor in 2017 in sailing
- Matthew Allen, curler in 2016 CIS/CCA Curling Championships
- Matthew John Allen, chemist inorganic chemist, professor and Assistant Vice President for Research and Innovation at Wayne State University

== See also ==
- Matt Allen, American football pundit
- Matthew Allan, Australian rules
- Matthew Allan (baseball)
- Matthew Alan, actor
- Matthew Allin, cricketer
