= Newport Yacht Club =

Newport Yacht Club may refer to:

- Newport Harbor Yacht Club in Balboa Peninsula, Newport Beach in America
- Newport Yacht Club, Bellevue in Bellevue, Washington near Seattle in America
- Newport Yacht Club, New Jersey in New Jersey in America it may also be referred to as Newport Yacht Club & Marina
- Newport Yacht Club, Rhode Island in America
- Newport Yacht Club, Rochester in America
- Newport Yacht Club, Stoney Creek in Canada
