= List of African Championships medalists in sailing =

This is a List of African Championships medalists in sailing.

== 470 ==
Year	Gold	Silver	Bronze
2016 Cape Town	South Africa; Asenathi Jim; Roger Hudson	South Africa; Sibusiso Sizatu; Alex Burger	South Africa; Brevan Thompson; Alexander Ham

== RS:X ==
Year	Gold	Silver	Bronze
2017 Moonbeach Resort	Bouras Hamza (ALG)	Jean-Marc Gardette (SEY)	Mohamed Elsafty (EGY)

== See also ==
- ASCON
