= Florian Reichstädter =

Austrian sailor

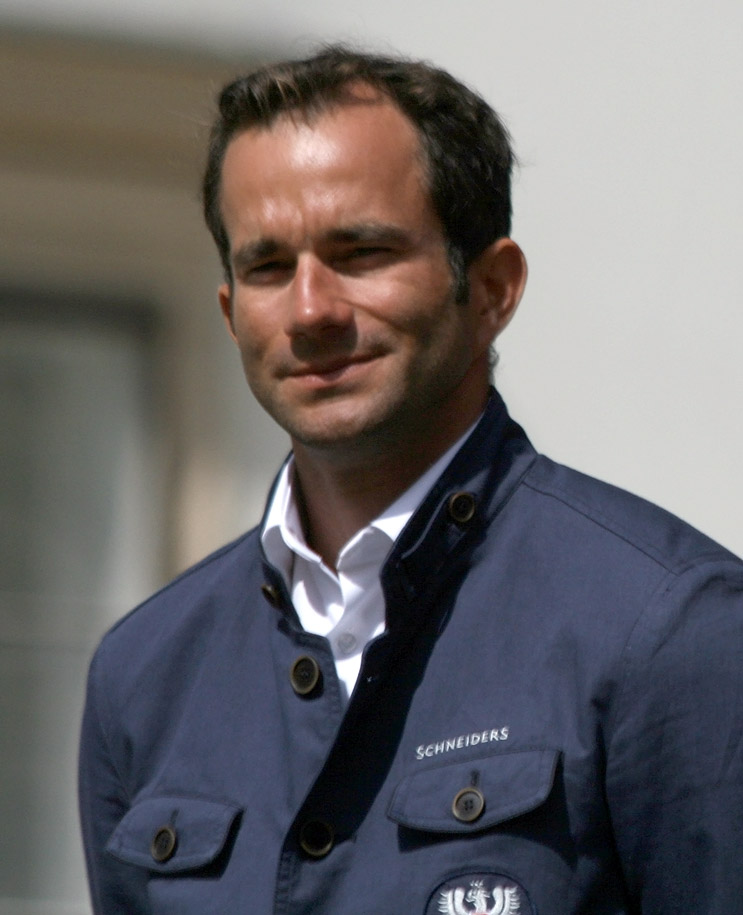

Personal information
- Nickname: Reichi
- Nationality: Austria
- Born: 3 July 1980 (age 45) Vienna, Austria
- Height: 1.79 m (5 ft 10 1/2 in)
- Weight: 70 kg (154 lb)

Sailing career
- Sport: Sailing
- Club: Yacht Club Breitenbrunn
- Coached by: Christian Binder
- Class: Dinghy

Florian Reichstädter (born 3 July 1980 in Vienna) is an Austrian sailor, who specialized in two-person dinghy (470) class. He represented Austria, along with his partner Matthias Schmid, in two editions of the Olympic Games (2008 and 2012), and has also been training for Yacht Club Breitenbrunn in Germany throughout most of his sporting career under his personal coaches Alfred Pelinka and Christian Binder. As of September 2013, Reichstadter is ranked second in the world for two-person dinghy class by the International Sailing Federation, following his successes at the North American Championships and Sailing World Cup Series in Miami, Florida, United States.

Reichstadter made his official debut at the 2008 Summer Olympics in Beijing, where he paired up with crew member Matthias Schmid in the men's 470 class. The Austrian duo finished twenty-fourth in a ten-round opening series with a net score of 164, trailing Switzerland's Tobias Etter and Felix Steiger by a narrow, two-point gap from the final standings.

At the 2012 Summer Olympics in London, Reichstadter competed for the second time as a crew member in the men's 470 class by finishing twenty-first and receiving a berth from the ISAF World Championships in Perth, Western Australia. Teaming again with Schmid in the opening series, the Austrian duo mounted an early lead on the first leg, but came up short for the medal podium with an accumulated net score of 107 points and a ninth-place finish in a fleet of twenty-seven boats.

He worked as a coach to Rosa Donner and Sebastian Slivon who achieved success as juniors on 470 class dinghies.
