= Manu Francis =

Indian sailor

Personal information
- Nationality: India
- Born: 26 February 1995 (age 31) Varapuzha, Kerala, India

Sailing career
- Sport: Sailing
Medal record
Men's sailing
Representing India
Asian Games
Silver medal – second place	2026 Aichi Nagoya	Men's 49er

Manu Francis (born 26 Feb 1995) is an Indian sailor. He has won a silver medal at the 2026 Asian Games in Men's 49er with Prince Noble.

== Career ==
Francis is Sapper in Madras Engineer Group in Indian Army. He won bronze medal at 2022 Asian Sailing Championship in Abu Dhabi and the 2023 Asian Sailing championship in Pattaya.
