= 2018 Extreme Sailing Series =

2018 international sailing events

Event title
- Edition: 12th
- Dates: 14 March – 2 December
- Yachts: GC32

The 2018 Extreme Sailing Series was a series of GC32 catamaran class sailing events staged during 2018. The series began in March in Muscat, Oman, and the final event took place in Los Cabos, Mexico in late November and early December. The 2018 season was also the last season before the collapse of the Extreme Sailing Series.

== Events ==
Event locations of 2018 Extreme Sailing Series

The 2018 series consisted of seven acts across three continents, and included the inaugural G32 World Championship in Riva del Garda, Italy.

| Date | Event | City | Country |
|---|---|---|---|
| 14–17 March | Act 1 | Muscat | Oman |
| 24–27 May | GC32 World Championship | Riva del Garda | Italy |
| 14–17 June | Act 3 | Barcelona | Spain |
| 5–8 July | Act 4 | Cascais | Portugal |
| 24–27 August | Act 5 | Cardiff | United Kingdom |
| 18–21 October | Act 6 | San Diego | United States |
| 29 November – 2 December | Act 7 | Los Cabos | Mexico |

== See also ==
2018 Sailing World Cup
