= Sailing at the 2026 Asian Games – Men's 49er =

Men's 49er at the 2026 Asian Games
- Venue: Kaiyoh Yacht Harbor
- Date: 28 September – 1 October 2026
- Competitors: 12 from 6 nations

Medalists
gold medal	Wen Zaiding; Liu Tian	China
silver medal	Prince Noble; Manu Francis	India
bronze medal	Akira Sakai; Russell Aylsworth	Hong Kong

The men's 49er competition at the 2026 Asian Games was held from 28 September – 1 October 2026 at Kaiyoh Yacht Harbor in Gamagōri, Aichi, Japan.

Wen Zaiding and Liu Tian won the gold medal, Prince Noble and Manu Francis took silver and Akira Sakai and Russell Aylsworth bronze.

== Schedule ==
All times are Japan Standard Time (UTC+09:00).

Date	Time	Event
Monday, 28 September 2026	11:00	Race 1–2
Wednesday, 30 September 2026	11:00	Race 3–5
Thursday, 1 October 2026	10:00	Race 6–9

== Results ==
Legend

- DSQ — Disqualification
- STP — Standard penalty
- UFD — U flag disqualification

Rank	Team	Race									Total	Net
Rank	Team	1	2	3	4	5	6	7	8	9	Total	Net
1st place, gold medalist(s)	China (CHN); Wen Zaiding; Liu Tian	4	1	3	1	~~(5)~~	1	2	3	1	21	16
2nd place, silver medalist(s)	India (IND); Prince Noble; Manu Francis	2	3	1	4	2	5	4	~~(6)~~	2	29	23
3rd place, bronze medalist(s)	Hong Kong (HKG); Akira Sakai; Russell Aylsworth	~~(5)~~	4	2	2	3	3	1	4	4	28	23
4	South Korea (KOR); Chae Bong-jin; Shin Sang-min	3	2	5	5	1	~~(6)~~	3	2	5	32	26
5	Oman (OMA); Ahmed Al Hasani; Waleed Al-Kendi	1	6	4	3	4	4	6	5	~~(6.1)~~; STP	39.1	33
6	Japan (JPN); Teruaki Shimakura; Shintaro Kamisonoda	~~(6)~~	5	6	6	6	2	5	1	3	40	34
