= Youth Lightning World Championship =

Youth sailing regatta for Lightning

The Lightning Youth World Championship is an bi-annual international sailing regatta for lightning (dinghy), organized by the host club on behalf of the International Lightning Class Association and recognized by World Sailing, the sports IOC recognized governing body.

== Editions ==
Host club of the Youth Lightning World Championship

Edition			Hosts			Boats	Sailors					Ref
No.	Date	Year	Host club	Location	Nat.	Boats	No.			Nat.	Cont.	Ref
1		1978	Yacht Club Peruano	La Punta	Peru	18	54			10	4	
2		1980	Buffalo Canoe Club	Fort Erie, Ontario	Canada	20	60			11	3	
3		1982	Circolo Velico Marsala	Marsala	Italy	14	42			6	3	
4		1984	Metedeconk River Yacht Club	Brick Township, New Jersey	United States	13	39			6	3	
5		1986	Yacht Club Olivos	Olivos	Argentina	12				6	2	
6	Aug	1988	Nasijarven Purjehdusseura; Nasijarvi Segelsallskap RY	Tampere	Finland	10	30			6	3	
7	22–27 July	1990	Buffalo Canoe Club	Fort Erie, Ontario	Canada	15	45			8	3	
8		1992	Higuerillas Yacht Club	Concón	Chile	19	57			9	3	
9	16–21 July	1994	Cercle de Voile de Neuchatel	Lake Neuchatel	Switzerland	17	51			10	3	
10	8-13 Sept	1996	Metedeconk River Yacht Club	Brick Township, New Jersey	United States	19	57			8	3	
11	20-28 Nov	1998	Salinas Yacht Club	Salinas	Ecuador	16	48			8	3	
12	3–8 July	2000	Yacht Club of Greece; Yacht Racing Club of Athens	Athens	Greece	18	59			9	3	
13	6–11 July	2002	Newport Yacht Club, Rochester	Rochester, New York	United States	13	39			5	3	
14	27Feb-3 Mar	2004	Clube de Campo de São Paulo	São Paulo	Brazil	14	42			5	3	
15	13–16 July	2006	Jyväskylän Veneseura	Jyväskylä	Finland	10	30			5	3	
16	14–18 July	2008	Royal St. Lawrence Yacht Club	Dorval, Quebec	Canada	11	33	27	6	4	3	
17	19–22 July	2010	Salinas Yacht Club	Salinas	Ecuador	16	48			8	2	
18	23–27 July	2012	Tuusulanjärven Purjehtijat	Järvenpää	Finland	16	48			8	3	
19	28Jun- 2 Jul	2014	Buffalo Canoe Club	Fort Erie, Ontario	Canada	24	72			5	3	
20	23–27 July	2016	Salinas Yacht Club	Salinas	Ecuador	20	60			9	3	
21	3–7 July	2018	Nautical Athletic Club of Voula	Voula	Greece	16	48			7	3	
N/A		2020	Sheboygan Yacht Club	Sheboygan, Wisconsin	United States	DELAYED COVID						
N/A	7–11 July	2021	Sheboygan Yacht Club	Sheboygan, Wisconsin	United States	DELAYED COVID						
22	5–10 July	2022	Sheboygan Yacht Club	Sheboygan, Wisconsin	United States	15	45			6	3	
23	23–27 July	2024	Cofradía Naútica del Pacífico; Yacht Club in Algarrobo	Algarrobo	Chile	20	60			9	3	
24	22-26 Jun	2026	Tuusulanjärven Purjehtijat		Finland	16	48	36	12	8	3	

== Medalists ==
Games	Gold	Silver	Bronze}	Ref.
1978 Peru	US 13229 Stephen Craig (USA); Jeff Grinnan (USA); Cindy Craig (USA)	A 11800	KA 13239	
1980 Onterio; Canada	USA 11077 Ian Jones (USA); Jody Lutz (USA); Kevin Robinson (USA)	BRA 12657	ARG 11041	
1982 Sicily, Italy	CAN 13577 Gordon Anderson (CAN); Paul Thompson (CAN); Stuart Hebb (CAN)			
1984 Brick, NJ USA	6345 Jody Swanson (USA); Joe Donovan (USA); Joe Starck (USA)			
1986 Olivos, Argentina	13682; Guillermo Parada (ARG); UNKNOWN; UNKNOWN	12824; Christian Frers (ARG)	11039; Axel Rodger (ARG)	
1988 Tampere, Finland	Duncan Stewart (CAN)			
1990 Point Abino, Canada	11631 Ned Roseberry (USA); Geoff Jarvis (USA); Twigg Stewart (USA)	11459; Alexandros Dimou (GRE)	14018; Ville Lahteinen (FIN)	
1992 Vina Del Mar, Chile	Tom Starck (USA) Guy Adema (USA); Martha Wilson (USA)			
1994 Neuchatel; Switzerland	Marty Essig (CAN) Tory Crowder (CAN); Todd Fedyszyn (CAN)			
1996 Brick, NJ; USA; 19 Boats	14780; Miguel Plaza Jr (ECU); Carlos PLAZA; Francis PLAZA	14397; Chad ATKINS (USA); Adam BURNS; Cap PIN	14597; Gabe CROWDER (CAN); Adam DUNN; John VICKERS	
1998 Salina; Ecuador; 16 Boats	USA 14640; Sean Carroll (USA); Karl Schutte (USA); Kate Sheahan (USA)	GRE 14377; Constantinos Merentitis (GRE); Hilias Manolakis (GRE); Michalis Koulianos (GRE)	COL 14057; J. Camilo Bustos; Camilo Salcedo; Nicolas Deeb	
2000 Athens; Greece; 18 Boats	GRE 14687; Dionisis Dimou (GRE); Michalis Pateniotis (GRE); Thanassis SiouziosAntonis Pateniotis (GRE)	GRE 14197; Sotiris Dimopoulos (GRE); Vagelis Kafetzidakis (GRE); Charis Finos (GRE); George Finos (GRE)	ARG 11649; Jose Maria Bettini; Cofone Juan; Valette Franco	
2002 Rockester; 13 Boats	15152; Thomas Sumner; Pedro Soares; Mark Pineda	14056; Erik Johnson; Karl Johnson; Kate Brush	15103; Travis Maier; Meredith PELTON; Robert RAMIREZ	
2004 São Paulo; Brazil; 14 Boats	BRA 14330; Thomas Sumner; Felipe Brito; Mark Pineda	BRA 14378; Marcelo Bellotti; Eduardo Molina; Alejandro Carri	BRA 14894; Joao Hackerott; Constantin Vassilas; Jorge Zarif	
2006 Jyväskylä; Finland; 10 Boats	BRA 14894; Thomas Sumner; Felipe Brito; Felipe Brito	GRE 15077; Panagiotis VERGINADIS; Timos Vlachos; Theodoros Poulakos	USA 14146; Nicholas Aswad; Connor Aswad; Peter Hazelett	
2008 Quebec; Canada; 11 Boats	15298; Taylor Lutz (USA); Luke Vreeland; Bernie Roesler	14901; Ian Schillebeeckx (BEL); Connor Aswad (USA); Will Schwarz (USA)	15166; Matthew Schon; Timmy Crann; Jason Lutz	
2010 Salinas; Ecador; 16 Boats	ECU 14379; Jonathan Martinetti; Pedro Velez; Eduardo Viteri	ARG 1 Tomas Dietrich; Tomas Pellejero; Gaston Bisto	BRA 15333; Rafael Krausz; Otavio Birman; Nicolas Brancher	
2012 Järvenpää; Finland; 16 Boats	CAN 14895; Adam MacDonald; Abby Bennett; Sam Jones	USA 15122; Timmy Crann; Lauren Jones; Alica Blumenthal	USA 15202(3); Mike Gemperline; Scott Vining; Stuart Wallace	
2014 Ontario; Canada; 24 Boats	BRA 15333; Felipe Rondina; Jose Afonso Hackerott; Thomas Sylvestre	USA 15166; Jonathan Lutz; Alexandra Jones; Nicholas Sertl	CHI 11011; Cristobal Molina Lorca; Jens Kuhlenthal Pfeffer; Pedro Andres Vera Carrera	
2016 Salinas; Ecuador; 20 Boats	BRA 15333; Felipe Rondina; Thomas Petrie Sylvestre; Christian Lacerda Shaw	ARG 13360; Martin Cloos; Bautista Menendez; Lucas Elias	ECU 14675; Matias Dyck; John Birkett; Jose Andres Lecaro	
2018 Voula; Greece; 16 Boats	USA 14748; Jeffrey Hayden; Meredith Ryan; Brian Hayes Jnr.	GRE 15144; V Gourgiotis; G Tsoulfas; M Kypraios	BRA 15333; J Hackerott; E Van Deursen; M Peek	
2022	BRA 15333 - Relampago Marquinhos; Nicolas Bernal (BRA); Mathias Reimer (BRA); Felipe Fonseca (BRA)	CHI 15196 - Rasputín; Dante Parodi (CHI); Diego Natho (CHI); Santiago Lorca (CHI)	USA 15298 - sthphvädths Brady Starck (USA); Bobby Starck (USA); Adam Starck (USA)	
2024	PER 15265 - Flying; Alec Hughes; Sergio Gutarra; Sofia Ruales	CHI 15561 - Protip; Rafaela Salvatore; Walter Malsch; Jorge Urzúa	BRA 15333 - Lightning; Gustavo Glimm; Fernando Menezes; Guilherme Menezes	
2026	CAN 15181; Rory Walsh (CAN); Andre Deseau (CAN); Gustave Deseau (CAN)	GRE 15147; Alexandros Pallis (GRE); Minoas Angelidakis (GRE); Sotirios Ragkousis (GRE)	USA 15644; Sabrina Starck (USA); Jane Rathbun (USA); Katherine Starck (USA)	
