= Jean-Marc Gardette =

Seychellois windsurfer

Personal information
- Born: 4 July 1984 (age 41) Anse Kerlan, Seychelles

Sailing career
- Sport: Sailing
Medal record
Men's sailing
Representing Seychelles
RS:X African Championships
Silver medal – second place	2017 Egypt	RS:X

Jean-Marc Gardette (born 4 July 1984) is a Seychellois sailor. He placed 33rd in the men's RS:X event at the 2016 Summer Olympics.
