= Matthias Schmid =

Austrian sailor

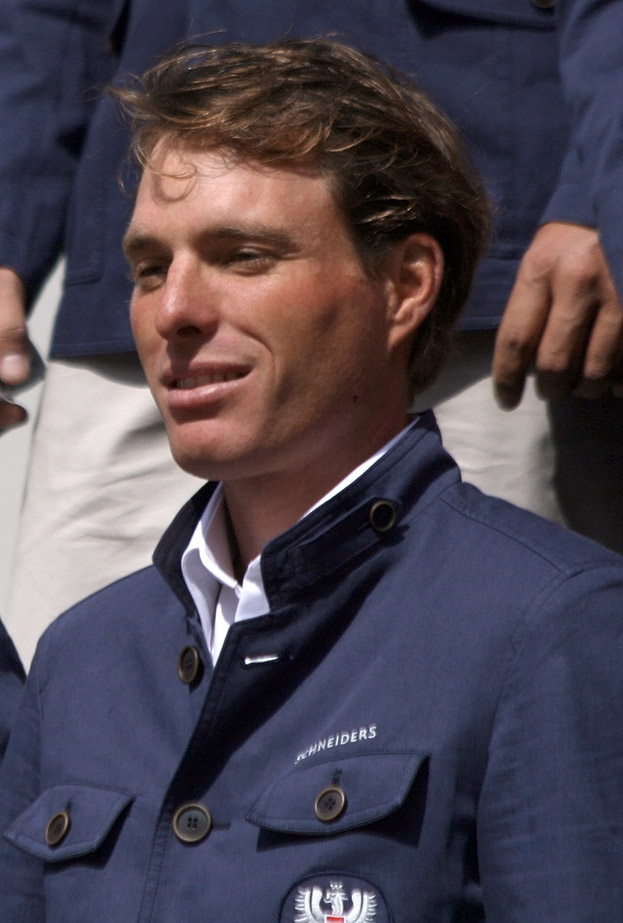

Personal information
- Nationality: Austria
- Born: 12 December 1980 (age 45) Vienna, Austria
- Height: 1.74 m (5 ft 8 1/2 in)
- Weight: 64 kg (141 lb)

Sailing career
- Sport: Sailing
- Club: Yacht Club Breitenbrunn
- Coached by: Christian Binder
- Class: Dinghy

Matthias Schmid (born 12 December 1980 in Vienna) is an Austrian sailor, who specializes in two-person dinghy (470) class. He represented Austria, along with his partner Florian Reichstädter, in two editions of the Olympic Games (2008 and 2012), and has also been training for Yacht Club Breitenbrunn in Germany throughout most of his sporting career under his personal coaches Alfred Pelinka and Christian Binder. As of September 2013, Schmid is ranked second in the world for two-person dinghy class by the International Sailing Federation, following his successes at the North American Championships and Sailing World Cup Series in Miami, Florida, United States.

Schmid made his official debut at the 2008 Summer Olympics in Beijing, where he paired up with skipper Florian Reichstädter in the men's 470 class. The Austrian duo finished twenty-fourth in a ten-round opening series with a net score of 164, trailing Switzerland's Tobias Etter and Felix Steiger by a narrow, two-point gap from the final standings.

At the 2012 Summer Olympics in London, Schmid competed for the second time as a crew member in the men's 470 class by finishing twenty-first and receiving a berth from the ISAF World Championships in Perth, Western Australia. Teaming again with Reichstadter in the opening series, the Austrian duo mounted an early lead on the first leg, but came up short for the medal podium with an accumulated net score of 107 points and a ninth-place finish in a fleet of twenty-seven boats.
