= Agnieszka Skrzypulec =

Polish sailor

Personal information
- Born: 3 June 1989 (age 37) Szczecin, Poland

Sailing career
- Sport: Sailing
- College team: Irmina Mrózek Gliszczynska
- Club: SEJK Pogoń Szczecin
- Coached by: Zdzisław Staniul
- Classes: 470, Laser 4.7, 5O5
Medal record
Sailing
Representing Poland
Olympic Games
Silver medal – second place	2020 Tokyo	470
470 World Championships
Gold medal – first place	2017 Thessaloniki	470
470 European Championship
Bronze medal – third place	2017 Monaco, MON	470
470 North American Championships
Bronze medal – third place	2018 Coconut Grove Sailing Club	470
Laser 4.7 World Championships
Silver medal – second place	2006 Hourtin	Laser 4.7
505 Polish Championships
Gold medal – first place	2017 Gdynia	505
Bronze medal – third place	2016 Krynica Morska	505

Agnieszka Skrzypulec (born 3 June 1989 in Szczecin) is a Polish sports sailor.

At the 2012 Summer Olympics and 2016 Summer Olympics, she competed in the Women's 470 class. At the 2012 Summer Olympics, she competed with Jolanta Ogar. They were the first pair to represent Poland in the women's 470 class. At the 2016 Olympics she competed with Irmina Gliszczynska. Skrzypulec and Gliszczynska won the 2017 Women's 470 World Championship. It was their first World Championship medal, and also Poland's first World 470 Championships gold. Previously they had finished 7th at the 2016 European Championships and 6th at the 2015 470 World Championship and 5th at the 2016 470 World Championship. Skrzypulec competed at the 2013 European Championships with Natalia Wojcik.

For the 2017 European Championships, Skrzypulec teamed up with Ogar again, winning bronze. Ogar had originally competed for Poland, switched to Austrian nationality and then returned to Polish colours.

For the 2017 505 Open Polish Championships, Skrzypulec teamed up with Holger Jess winning gold.

Skrzypulec is coached by Zdzisław Staniul.

Skrzypulec began sailing at 8 and racing at 10. She was encouraged to take up sailing by her parents who first met on a yacht.
