= Rosa Donner =

Austrian dinghy sailor

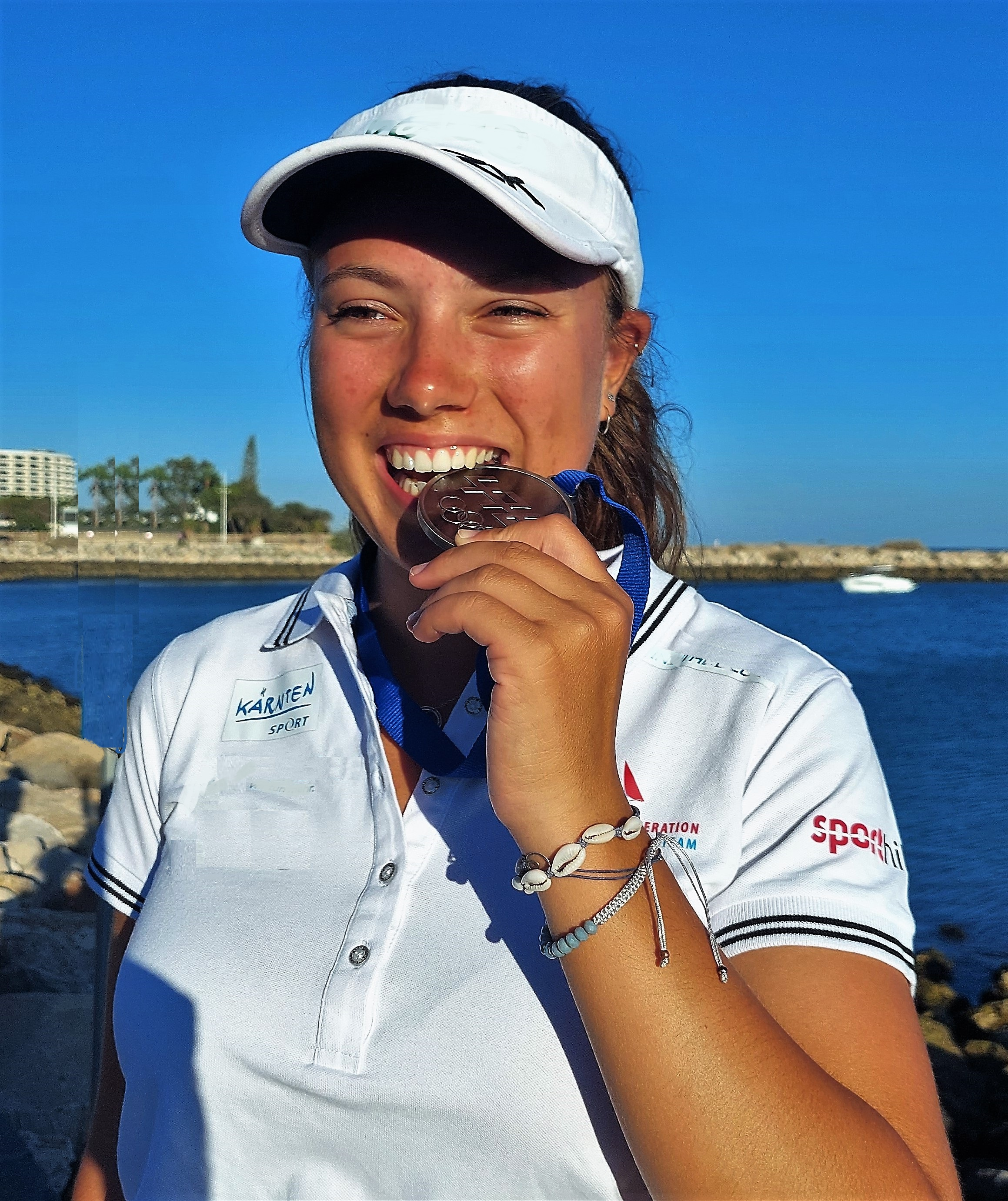
- Born: 2003 (age 22–23); Klagenfurt am Wörthersee
- Occupation: sailor

Rosa Donner (born 2003) is an Austrian 470 dinghy sailor. Her sailing partner was Sebastian Slivon until she changed to Niklas Haberl. She is coached by Florian Reichstädter.

== Life ==
Donner was born in 2003. She is from Klagenfurt am Wörthersee.

Donner has been sailing on Lake Wörthersee since she was about five. Since 2010, she has taken part in national and international regattas. At the age of 10 (2014) she sailed for the first time at a U15 Optimist European Championship in Dún Laoghaire in Ireland. At the age of 15 Donner and Sebastian Slivon won the Austrian U19 Championship on Lake Traunsee. Rosa Donner and Sebastian Slivon subsequently won several national and international titles. At the 420 World Championship in the U17 mixed category they reached 7th place (9th place over all).

At the beginning of 2020, Donner and Slivon achieved 1st place in the 420 World Championship qualification at Sanremo / Italy and 1st place in the open Croatian 420 Championship in Zadar. Due to the COVID-19 pandemic, the European Championships and World Championships were cancelled. She and Sebasrian Slivon switched from the 420 to the Olympic boat class 470. They were trained by the three-time Austrian Olympian sailor Florian Reichstädter.

In 2021, at the 470mixed European Championship U21 in Formia / Italy, they won the bronze medal, and at the 470mixed World Championship U21 in Sanremo they sailed to fifth place. In October 2021, Donner and Slivon were called up to the Austrian national team.

In April 2022, the Donner-Slivon Sailing Team competed in the Sailing World Cup for the first time . At the Trofeo Princesa Sofía regatta in Palma de Mallorca, the two reached 50th place out of 66 participants. Donner and Slivon achieved the Austrian qualification for the 470 Sailing European Championships 2021 in Vilamoura in Portugal and in 2022 at Çeşme in Turkey as well as the 470 Sailing World Championships 2021 in Quarteira in Portugal and 2022 in Sdot Jam in Israel.

In July 2022, She and Slivon won a silver medal for Austria at the Junior European Championship.

She and Slivon took a bronze medal at the 2022 Junior 470 World championship in August 2022. The gold was taken by Matisse Pacaud and Lucie De Gennes at the match in Tihany in Hungary.

In 2023, she began competing with Niklas Haberl as a sailing partner in Poland and Lithuania.
