= Prince Noble =

Indian sailor

Personal information
- Nationality: India
- Born: 12 March 1996 (age 30) Kochi, Kerala, India

Sailing career
- Sport: Sailing
Medal record
Men's sailing
Representing India
Asian Games
Silver medal – second place	2026 Aichi Nagoya	Men's 49er

Prince Noble (born 12 Mar 1996) is an Indian sailor. He has won a silver medal at 2026 Asian Games in Men's 49er with Manu Francis.

== Career ==
Noble is a Havildar in the Madras Engineer Group in Indian Army. He won bronze medal at 2022 Asian Sailing Championship in Abu Dhabi and the 2023 Asian Sailing Championship in Pattaya.
