= Lukas Mähr =

Austrian sailor

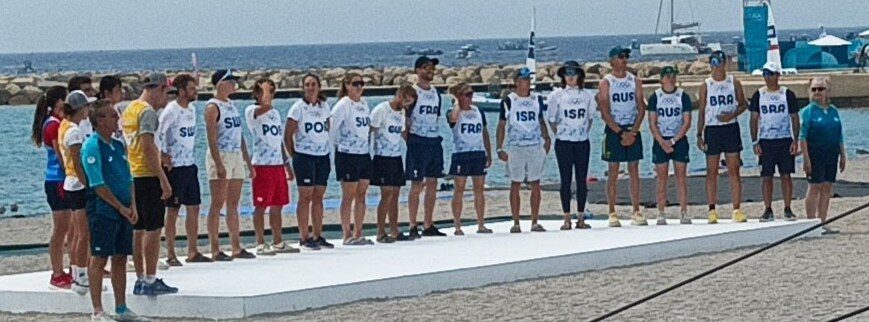
- Mähr as part of the 2024 Olympic team

Personal information
- Nationality: Austrian
- Born: 23 April 1990 (age 36) Bregenz, Austria

Sport
- Sport: Sailing
Medal record
Men's sailing
Representing Austria
Olympic Games
Gold medal – first place	2024 Paris	470 mixed
Sailing World Championships
Bronze medal – third place	2017 Thessaloniki	470

Lukas Mähr (born 23 April 1990) is a retired Austrian sailor. He competed in the 470 event at the 2024 Summer Olympics, where he won a gold medal with Lara Vadlau.

== Biography ==
Mähr's first success as a sailor came in 2017 when he won the bronze medal at the Sailing World Championships at Thessaloniki, alongside his partner David Bargehr.

Since 2021, his sailing partner is Lara Vadlau in the 470 mixed category. They finished 8th in the 2022 world championships, 4th in 2023, and 10th in 2024.

Their 4th place in 2023 brought them the qualification for the 2024 summer olympics. They entered the final medal race in the leading position, securing the gold medal with a 7th-place finish.

== Personal life ==
Mähr is father of two children. He currently lives in Gutenstein in Lower Austria.
