= Jon Bilger =

New Zealand sailor

Personal information
- Nationality: New Zealand
- Born: 25 March 1969 (age 56); Auckland, New Zealand

Sport
- Sport: Sailing

Jon Bilger (born 25 March 1969) is a New Zealand sailor. He competed in the men's 470 event at the 1992 Summer Olympics.
