= Eilidh McIntyre =

British sailor (born 1994)

Eilidh McIntyre MBE
Personal information
- Full name: Eilidh Jane McIntyre
- Nationality: British
- Born: 4 June 1994 (age 32) Winchester, England

Sailing career
- Sport: Sailing
- Club: Hayling Island
- Class: 470
Medal record
Sailing
Representing Great Britain
Olympic Games
| Gold medal – first place | 2020 Tokyo | 470 |
470 European Championships
| Bronze medal – third place | 2013 Formia | 470 |
| Bronze medal – third place | 2015 Aarhus | 470 |
| Silver medal – second place | 2019 Sanremo | 470 |
| Silver medal – second place | 2021 Vilamoura | 470 |
470 World Championships
| Silver medal – second place | 2017 Thessaloniki | 470 |
| Gold medal – first place | 2019 Enoshima | 470 |

Eilidh Jane McIntyre (born 4 June 1994) is a British former sailor, who won the gold medal alongside Hannah Mills in the 470 event at the 2020 Summer Olympics. She won the 2019 470 World Championships, and came second at the 2017 470 World Championships. She finished third at the 2015 470 European Championships, and second at the 2019 and 2021 events, as well as having won multiple Sailing World Cup medals. In 2022, McIntyre was awarded an MBE for services to yachting.

== Career ==
McIntyre joined the British Sailing Team at the age of 15. In 2013, McIntyre and Sophie Weguelin won the Kiel Week 470 event. In 2014, the pair won the US Sailing's Miami Olympic Classes Regatta. McIntyre won multiple medals at the 2015 ISAF Sailing World Cup. McIntyre and Weguelin came third at the 2015 470 European Championships. The pair failed to qualify for the 2016 Summer Olympics. After the 2016 Summer Olympics, McIntyre teamed up with Hannah Mills, as Mills' former partner Saskia Clark retired after the Games. McIntyre and Mills came second at the 2017 470 World Championships, and the 2018 World Cup event in Hyères, France.

In 2019, McIntyre and Mills won a gold medal at the 470 World Championships, came second at the Olympic test event in Enoshima, Japan, and came second at the 2019 470 European Championships. In October 2019, McIntyre was awarded a place in the 470 event at the 2020 Summer Olympics, alongside Mills. After the Olympics were postponed from 2020 to 2021, British Sailing confirmed that their squad selection were unchanged, and so McIntyre was still selected for the Games. During the COVID-19 pandemic, McIntyre and Mills trained in Lanzarote in the Canary Islands, as well as at the Weymouth and Portland National Sailing Academy. In January 2021, McIntyre was critical of a suggestion by Matthew Pinsent that the Olympics should be delayed until 2024. In March 2021, McIntyre and Mills competed at the 470 World Championship, their first event for 18 months. At the 2021 470 European Championships, the pair finished second.

McIntyre won the gold medal alongside Mills at the delayed 2020 Summer Olympics. The pair were ahead going into the medal race, where they needed to finish seventh or higher to win the gold medal. They eventually finished fifth in that race. In December 2021, McIntyre and Mills won the World Sailor of the Year Awards.

In 2022, McIntyre started competing with Martin Wrigley, as the 470 events at the 2024 Summer Olympics were mixed-gender.

In February 2023, McIntyre announced her retirement from sailing.

== Honours ==
McIntyre was appointed Member of the Order of the British Empire (MBE) in the 2022 New Year Honours for services to sailing.

== Personal life ==
McIntyre is from Hayling Island, Hampshire, England. She was privately educated at the independent Mayville High School in Southsea, England. As of 2021, McIntyre was engaged. Her Scottish father Michael won a sailing gold medal at the 1988 Summer Olympics.
