= Newport Yacht Club, Rochester =

Newport Yacht Club
- Burgee
- Founded: 1936
- Location: 694 Seneca Road, Irondequoit, NY 14622
- Website: www.newportyc.org

The Newport Yacht Club is a private yacht club located in Irondequoit, New York, on the shore of Irondequoit Bay.

== Fleets ==
The Snipe International Class fleet holds number 103 in the listing of Snipe fleets around the world, and was the first class raced at Newport. The Lightning fleet was added in 1946. In 1953 the Comets and Lightnings of the Algonquin Yacht Club and the Snipes from the Nine Mile Point Yacht Club joined Newport. Lasers in 1976 and Optimist in 1992 were added, and a Cruising fleet was formally established in 1999.
