= Nautical Club of Thessaloniki =

- Founded: 1931
- League: (Greece) A1 Ethniki
- Based in: Kalamaria, Thessaloniki
- Website: https://www.ncth.gr/

The Nautical Club of Thessaloniki (Greek: Ναυτικός Όμιλος Θεσσαλονίκης) is a sports club based in Kalamaria, Thessaloniki, Greece. The club is commonly known by the acronym NCTH (ΝΟΘ).

== General information ==
It was established in 1931 and is the oldest established yacht club in Macedonia and now it has sailing and rowing branches. It organises many sailing and rowing competitions such as the Alexander the Great race and the North Aegean Reggata and participates regularly in sporting events such as the Aegean Reggata and other international races.

The club has about 600 regular and athletic members. It has a clubhouse and a restaurant.

== History ==
The Nautical Club of Thessaloniki was founded in 1931 and is one of the oldest nautical athletic associations in Greece.

During the early years, rowing was the only sport offered. Toward the end of the 1940s N.C.Th. achieved the title of "Most Winning Club" and sent crews both to the London Olympics in 1948 and Helsinki in 1952. N.C.Th.'s outstanding role in rowing has led many times to the title of "Most Winning Club", the continuous recruitment of athletes to the national team and distinctions in international championships (bronze medal in the Rowing Worlds of 1998, silver medals in the Rowing Worlds of 2005 and 2006).

In the 1950s, the Nautical Club of Thessaloniki came to include sailing in its activities. Almost immediately, it began to organize sailing races, to participate in national championships and other local meets. The club quickly gained a reputation as one of the most active sailing associations playing a prominent role both in Greece and beyond. Distinguished sailors represent Greece in international races and since 1992 in Olympic Games (Sydney 2000: 470 sailors finished 8th Olympic Winners) and gained gold and silver both in the 470 World Championships of 1995 and 2002 and in the Finn Youth World Championship of 1999 and 2000.

In the 1970s a group of experienced sailors spearheaded the creation of an offshore sailing department which gave the opportunity for older members to participate in nautical activities.

Towards the end of the 1970s the club, wanting to offer something to its remaining members established a tennis division with the construction of five courts and started a small athletic team.

As an athletic association N.C.Th. organizes intramural games on a yearly basis and also conducts Greek and international championships. It has even come to initiate international races, the foremost of which are the "International Rowing Regatta", the «Alexander the Great Cup» (former Tzeni Grammalidou Cup) for Olympic class sail boats and the international offshore sailing week "North Aegean Cup".

Since 1974 N.C.Th. is offering an offshore sailing school, thus giving the residents of greater Thessaloniki the opportunity and the resources to be involved with sailing and the sea in general. In the beginning of the 1990s N.C.Th. started a sailing school for children, which apart from its primary function also acts as a preparatory school for the sailing division.

During the first thirty years N.C.Th. was housed in a rented building until 1964 when it moved to its own premises which include offices, club rooms for members and athletes, boat houses, an indoor rowing exercise pool, a gym, a marina, tennis courts, a restaurant and snack-bar.

== Colors ==
The colors of the club are blue and yellow.
