= Tina Mrak =

Slovenian sailor (born 1988)

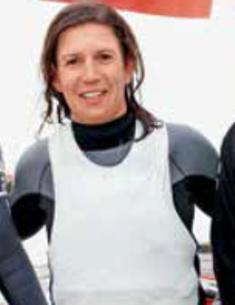
- Mrak in 2015

Personal information
- Nationality: Slovenian
- Born: 6 February 1988 (age 38) Koper, SFR Yugoslavia
- Height: 165 cm (5 ft 5 in)
- Weight: 62 kg (137 lb)

Sailing career
- Sport: Sailing
- Class(es): 470, Europe, Optimist
Medal record
Sailing
Representing Slovenia
World Championships
Bronze medal – third place	2017 Thessaloniki	Women's 470

Tina Mrak (born 6 February 1988 in Koper) is a Slovenian Olympic sailor and recipient of several medals from various international events. Mrak finished Faculty of sports, University of Ljubljana and earned a profession of Physical education teacher. She is employed in Sport unit, which is part of Slovenian armed forces. She was born in Koper. She competed in the 470 class at the 2012 Summer Olympics in London, together with Teja Černe. She competed in the same class at the 2016 Summer Olympics, this time with Veronika Macarol. Her best achievement is bronze medal from World Championship, which was held in July 2017 in Theasaloniki, Greece. At European championships she won two gold medals in 2015 and 2018, a silver medal in 2012 and two bronze medals in 2014 and 2016.
