= Giulio Calabrò =

Italian sailor

Personal information
- Nationality: Italian
- Born: 25 January 1996 (age 29); Rome, Italy

Sailing career
- Class(es): 470, 49er, 420

Giulio Calabrò (born 25 January 1996) is an Italian sailor. He competed in the men's 470 event at the 2020 Summer Olympics.
