= Giacomo Ferrari (sailor) =

Italian sailor

Personal information
- Nationality: Italian
- Born: 19 July 1996 (age 28); Rome, Italy

Sport
- Sport: Sailing

Giacomo Ferrari (born 19 July 1996) is an Italian sailor. He competed in the men's 470 event at the 2020 Summer Olympics.
