= Veronika Macarol =

Slovenian sailor

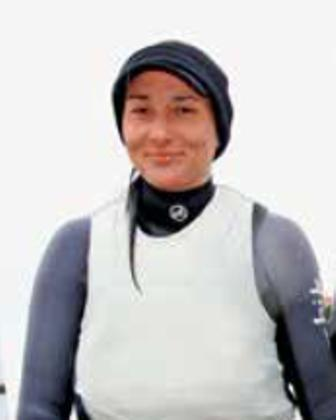

Personal information
- Born: 28 March 1987 (age 39) Koper

Sailing career
- Sport: Sailing
Medal record
Representing Slovenia
Sailing
World Championships
Bronze medal – third place	2017 Thessaloniki	Women's 470

Veronika Macarol (born 28 March 1987) is a Slovenian competitive sailor. She competed in the 470 class at the 2016 Summer Olympics in Rio de Janeiro, together with Tina Mrak.
