= Victoria Jurczok =

German sailor

Personal information
- Nationality: German
- Born: 25 March 1990 (age 36)
- Height: 1.61 m (5 ft 3 1/2 in)
- Weight: 56 kg (123 lb)

Sailing career
- Sport: Sailing
- Class: 49er FX

Victoria Jurczok (born 25 March 1990) is a German sailor. She represented Germany, along with partner Anika Lorenz, in the women's 49er FX class at the 2016 Summer Olympics in Rio de Janeiro. They finished in 9th place.
