= Irmina Gliszczyńska =

Polish sailor

Personal information
- Nationality: Polish
- Born: 9 February 1992 (age 34) Chojnice, Poland

Sailing career
- Sport: Sailing
Medal record
Sailing
Representing Poland
Gold medal – first place	2017 Thessaloniki	Women's 470

Irmina Mrózek Gliszczyńska (born 9 February 1992) is a Polish competitive sailor. She competed at the 2016 Summer Olympics in Rio de Janeiro, in the women's 470 class.
