= Anneloes van Veen =

Dutch sailor

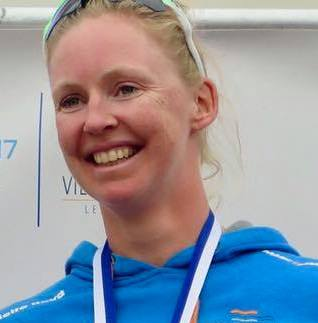

Personal information
- Born: 7 August 1990 (age 35)

Sport
- Country: Netherlands
- Sport: Sailing

Anneloes van Veen (born 7 August 1990) is a Dutch competitive sailor. She competed at the 2016 Summer Olympics in Rio de Janeiro, in the women's 470 class.
