= Anika Lorenz =

German sailor (born 1990)

Personal information
- Nationality: German
- Born: 9 December 1990 (age 35)
- Height: 1.72 m (5 ft 8 in)
- Weight: 70 kg (154 lb)

Sailing career
- Sport: Sailing
- Class: 49er FX

Anika Lorenz (born 9 December 1990) is a German sailor. She represented Germany, along with partner Victoria Jurczok, in the women's 49er FX class at the 2016 Summer Olympics in Rio de Janeiro. They finished in 9th place.
