= Afrodite Zegers =

Dutch sailor (born 1991)

Afrodite Zegers-de Kleine
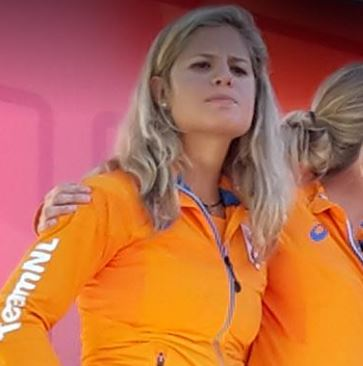
- Zegers-de Kleine in 2016

Personal information
- Nationality: Dutch and Greek
- Born: Afrodite Kyranakou; 2 December 1991 (age 34) Athens, Greece

Sailing career
- Country: Netherlands
- Sport: Sailing
- Team: Team NL

Achievements and titles
- Olympic finals: 4th place in Rio
- Highest world ranking: 1st place ISAF worldranking
Medal record
Women's sailing
Representing Netherlands
World Championships
Silver medal – second place	2021 Vilamoura	470
European Championships
Gold medal – first place	2017 Monaco	470
Silver medal – second place	2016 Mallorca	470
Bronze medal – third place	2019 Sanremo	470

Afrodite Zegers-de Kleine (Dutch pronunciation: [æ-fɹəʊ-daɪ-ti]; born Afrodite Kyranakou, 2 December 1991) is a Greek-born Dutch competitive sailor. She competed at the 2016 Summer Olympics in Rio de Janeiro in the women's 470 class, and at the 2020 Summer Olympics in Tokyo in the women's 470 class.
