= 2011 ISAF Sailing World Championships – Men's RS:X =

Men's RS:X at the 2011 ISAF Sailing World Championships
- Venue: Perth, Western Australia
- Dates: 12–18 December
- Competitors: 91 from 44 nations

Medalists
| gold medal | Dorian van Rijsselberghe | Netherlands |
| silver medal | Piotr Myszka | Poland |
| bronze medal | Nimrod Mashiach | Israel |

The Men's RS:X class at the 2011 ISAF Sailing World Championships was held in Perth, Western Australia between 12 and 18 December 2011.

== Results ==
Results of individual races
| Pos | Helmsman | Country | I | II | III | IV | V | VI | VII | VIII | IX | X | MR | Tot | Pts |
|---|---|---|---|---|---|---|---|---|---|---|---|---|---|---|---|
| Gold medal | Dorian van Rijsselberghe | Netherlands | 1 | 3 | 16^{†} | 1 | 1 | 1 | 4 | 3 | 3 | 8 | 8 | 49 | 33 |
| Silver medal | Piotr Myszka | Poland | 1 | 2 | 4 | 3 | 2 | 6 | 2 | 12^{†} | 2 | 2 | 16 | 52 | 40 |
| Bronze medal | Nimrod Mashiach | Israel | 2 | 1 | 2 | 1 | 4 | 8 | 12^{†} | 5 | 8 | 9 | 12 | 64 | 52 |
| 4 | Przemysław Miarczyński | Poland | 4 | 1 | 1 | 4 | 12 | 15^{†} | 1 | 8 | 6 | 1 | 14 | 67 | 52 |
| 5 | Jon Paul Tobin | New Zealand | 6 | 4 | 6 | 10 | 6 | 3 | 24^{†} | 2 | 7 | 7 | 10 | 85 | 61 |
| 6 | Tom Ashley | New Zealand | 2 | 7 | 3 | 2 | 12 | 20^{†} | 10 | 4 | 1 | 5 | 18 | 84 | 64 |
| 7 | Byron Kokkalanis | Greece | 5 | 9 | 10 | 2 | 4 | 43^{†} | 3 | 1 | 12 | 18 | 2 | 109 | 66 |
| 8 | Julien Bontemps | France | 10 | 6 | 2 | 4 | 5 | 13 | 29^{†} | 11 | 13 | 3 | 4 | 100 | 71 |
| 9 | Iván Pastor | Spain | 7 | 4 | 6 | 6 | 2 | 2 | 9 | 16 | 22^{†} | 15 | 6 | 95 | 73 |
| 10 | Joao Rodrigues | Portugal | 7 | 3 | 10 | 9 | 1 | 4 | 19^{†} | 6 | 16 | 10 | 20 | 105 | 86 |
| 11 | Ricardo Santos | Brazil | 15^{†} | 5 | 9 | 8 | 7 | 5 | 14 | 7 | 4 | 12 | – | 86 | 71 |
| 12 | Zachary Plavsic | Canada | 4 | 9 | 1 | 11 | 20^{†} | 10 | 17 | 13 | 9 | 6 | – | 100 | 80 |
| 13 | Nicholas Dempsey | Great Britain | 8 | 16^{†} | 13 | 5 | 15 | 12 | 7 | 10 | 10 | 4 | – | 100 | 84 |
| 14 | Elliot Carney | Great Britain | 3 | 8 | 3 | 6 | 6 | 27^{†} | 11 | 15 | 14 | 19 | – | 112 | 85 |
| 15 | Toni Wilhelm | Germany | 3 | 5 | 4 | 5 | 19 | 7 | 20^{†} | 14 | 17 | 14 | – | 108 | 88 |
| 16 | Andreas Cariolou | Cyprus | 12 | 6 | 7 | 10 | 3 | 21 | 37^{†} | 30 | 5 | 11 | – | 142 | 105 |
| 17 | Shahar Tzuberi | Israel | 6 | 16 | 9 | 12 | 3 | 24 | 15 | 38^{†} | 11 | 13 | – | 147 | 109 |
| 18 | Michal Majewski | Poland | 8 | 8 | 11 | 7 | 13 | 19 | 22^{†} | 17 | 19 | 17 | – | 141 | 119 |
| 19 | Louis Benoit Hug | France | 15 | 15 | 17 | 7 | 13 | 9 | 13 | 27^{†} | 23 | 21 | – | 160 | 133 |
| 20 | Pierre Le Coq | France | 16 | 13 | 7 | 13 | 5 | 25 | 31^{†} | 21 | 18 | 16 | – | 165 | 134 |
| 21 | Richard Stauffacher | Switzerland | 14 | 14 | 5 | 13 | 15 | 16 | 38^{†} | 22 | 15 | 22 | – | 174 | 136 |
| 22 | Maksym Oberemko | Ukraine | 16 | 10 | 13 | 8 | 10 | 30 | 6 | 18 | 25 | 33^{†} | – | 169 | 136 |
| 23 | Mariano Reutemann | Argentina | 5 | 10 | 14 | 18 | 18 | 11 | 16 | 26 | 20 | 44^{†} | – | 182 | 138 |
| 24 | Wang Aichen | China | 11 | 14 | 11 | 20 | 11 | 23 | 5 | 20 | 35^{†} | 34 | – | 184 | 149 |
| 25 | Lee Tae-hoon | South Korea | 13 | 2 | 12 | 3 | 22 | 14 | 34 | 32 | 26 | 35^{†} | – | 193 | 158 |
| 26 | Makoto Tomizawa | Japan | 14 | 13 | 18 | 20 | 17 | 36^{†} | 30 | 19 | 30 | 20 | – | 217 | 181 |
| 27 | Cho Won-woo | South Korea | DNF 47^{†} | 15 | 14 | 23 | 16 | 17 | 32 | 9 | 34 | 26 | – | 233 | 186 |
| 28 | Áron Gádorfalvi | Hungary | 20 | 12 | 12 | 12 | 7 | 28 | 27 | 41^{†} | 41 | 29 | – | 229 | 188 |
| 29 | Andy Leung | Hong Kong | 11 | 22 | 32 | 16 | 8 | 26 | 41^{†} | 23 | 29 | 25 | – | 233 | 192 |
| 30 | Luka Mratović | Croatia | 20 | 18 | 27 | 14 | 8 | 34 | 42^{†} | 28 | 21 | 23 | – | 235 | 193 |
| 31 | David Hayes | Canada | 9 | 12 | 26 | 25 | 16 | 18 | 21 | 42^{†} | 37 | 31 | – | 237 | 195 |
| 32 | Maksymilian Wojcik | Poland | 23 | 21 | 8 | 11 | 14 | 44^{†} | 18 | 35 | 33 | 36 | – | 243 | 199 |
| 33 | Sebastian Wang-Hansen | Norway | 10 | 24 | 21 | 17 | 21 | 29 | 25 | 31^{†} | 24 | 28 | – | 230 | 199 |
| 34 | Benjamin Tillier | France | 26 | 23 | 8 | 17 | 24 | 31 | 8 | 34 | 44^{†} | 30 | – | 245 | 201 |
| 35 | Juan Manuel Moreno | Spain | 21 | 19 | 24 | 19 | 9 | 40 | 26 | 46^{†} | 27 | 27 | – | 258 | 212 |
| 36 | Federico Esposito | Italy | 12 | 27 | 5 | 19 | 10 | 35 | 44^{†} | 39 | 28 | 39 | – | 258 | 214 |
| 37 | Juozas Bernotas | Lithuania | 18 | 11 | 29 | 15 | 29 | 22 | 35 | 24 | 43^{†} | 32 | – | 258 | 215 |
| 38 | Robert Willis | United States | 9 | 7 | 29 | 14 | 28 | 32 | 33 | 40^{†} | 31 | 38 | – | 261 | 221 |
| 39 | Dmitry Polishchuk | Russia | 18 | 24 | 38 | 9 | 26 | 41 | 45^{†} | 25 | 39 | 24 | – | 289 | 244 |
| 40 | Kwok Fai Cheng | Hong Kong | 28 | 23 | 18 | 24 | 9 | 42 | 28 | 37 | 46^{†} | 43 | – | 298 | 252 |
| 41 | Chuankun Shi | China | 24 | 20 | 30 | 18 | 14 | 45^{†} | 23 | 44 | 38 | 42 | – | 298 | 253 |
| 42 | David Mier | Mexico | 21 | 21 | 16 | 24 | 23 | 39 | 43^{†} | 33 | 40 | 37 | – | 297 | 254 |
| 43 | Tim Gourlay | Australia | 24 | 11 | 22 | 27 | 36 | 33 | 39 | 29 | 36 | 40^{†} | – | 297 | 257 |
| 44 | Luke Baillie | Australia | 13 | 17 | 23 | 15 | 42 | 37 | 40 | 45^{†} | 32 | 41 | – | 305 | 260 |
| 45 | Yikai Huang | China | 17 | 31 | 15 | 16 | 22 | 46^{†} | 36 | 43 | 42 | 45 | – | 313 | 267 |
| 46 | Santiago Grillo | Colombia | 17 | 26 | 19 | 29 | 20 | 38 | 46^{†} | 36 | 45 | 46 | – | 322 | 276 |
| 47 | Yoan Kolev | Bulgaria | 22 | 18 | 27^{†} | 21 | 26 | 12 | 2 | 6 | 3 | 5 | – | 142 | 115 |
| 48 | Tom Squires | Great Britain | 19 | 22 | 21 | 23 | 32^{†} | 2 | 1 | 7 | 15 | 6 | – | 148 | 116 |
| 49 | Ek Boonsawad | Thailand | 22 | 25 | 28^{†} | 26 | 11 | 3 | 10 | 8 | 5 | 10 | – | 148 | 120 |
| 50 | Sam Sills | Great Britain | 26^{†} | 26 | 17 | 26 | 17 | 4 | 19 | 17 | 21 | 1 | – | 174 | 148 |
| 51 | Johannes Ahun | Estonia | 23 | 28 | 22 | 30 | 38^{†} | 7 | 6 | 14 | 26 | 3 | – | 197 | 159 |
| 52 | Lee Byung-gun | South Korea | 29 | 30 | 33^{†} | 22 | 27 | 8 | 22 | 15 | 2 | 7 | – | 195 | 162 |
| 53 | Karel Lavický | Czech Republic | 19 | 25 | 36^{†} | 25 | 29 | 1 | 23 | 5 | 25 | 16 | – | 204 | 168 |
| 54 | Patrik Pollák | Slovakia | 33 | 37^{†} | 23 | 32 | 25 | 17 | 4 | 12 | 18 | 4 | – | 205 | 168 |
| 55 | Henri Kaar | Estonia | 25 | 32 | 37^{†} | 31 | 30 | 10 | 7 | 13 | 24 | 2 | – | 211 | 174 |
| 56 | Chang Hao | Chinese Taipei | 32 | 17 | 35^{†} | 28 | 31 | 9 | 16 | 18 | 14 | 9 | – | 209 | 174 |
| 57 | Antonio Cozzolino | New Zealand | 25 | 32 | 25 | 33 | 24 | 15 | 5 | 4 | BFD 46^{†} | 13 | – | 222 | 176 |
| 58 | James Levy | Australia | 30 | 34^{†} | 15 | 32 | 33 | 6 | 11 | 16 | 12 | 26 | – | 215 | 181 |
| 59 | Leonard Ong | Singapore | 29 | 29 | 26 | 40^{†} | 30 | 5 | 9 | 22 | 10 | 27 | – | 227 | 187 |
| 60 | Daniel Flores | Venezuela | 34 | 29 | 32 | 22 | 40 | DNC 46^{†} | 8 | 3 | 7 | 14 | – | 235 | 189 |
| 61 | Fang Zhennan | China | 33 | 37^{†} | 19 | 37 | 18 | 24 | 25 | 11 | 1 | 23 | – | 228 | 191 |
| 62 | Zhu Jinyu | China | 42^{†} | 33 | 20 | 35 | 21 | 21 | 37 | 9 | 8 | 20 | – | 246 | 204 |
| 63 | Marcantonio Baglione | Italy | 28 | 20 | 20 | 27 | 33 | 19 | DNF 46^{†} | 10 | 9 | DNS 46 | – | 258 | 212 |
| 64 | Cho Jun-ho | South Korea | 27 | 31 | 40 | 41^{†} | 35 | 31 | 28 | 2 | 11 | 18 | – | 264 | 223 |
| 65 | Martynas Juodeska | Lithuania | 31 | DNF 47^{†} | 31 | 30 | 34 | 22 | 3 | 28 | 16 | 30 | – | 272 | 225 |
| 66 | Natthaphong Phonoppharat | Thailand | 32 | 33 | 34 | 35 | 23 | 13 | 13 | 25 | BFD 46^{†} | 19 | – | 273 | 227 |
| 67 | Takeshi Kaneko | Japan | 35 | 38 | 24 | 34 | 25 | 25 | 12 | 23 | BFD 46^{†} | 15 | – | 277 | 231 |
| 68 | Patrick Vos | Australia | 27 | 30 | 37 | 33 | 34 | 26 | 18 | 19 | BFD 46^{†} | 12 | – | 282 | 236 |
| 69 | Mauricio Martinez de Alva | Mexico | 34 | 35 | 28 | 29 | 40^{†} | 18 | 15 | 33 | 30 | 21 | – | 283 | 243 |
| 70 | Kevin Jakobsson | Estonia | 38 | 40^{†} | 25 | 31 | 31 | 30 | 32 | 24 | 6 | 28 | – | 285 | 245 |
| 71 | Lim Sung-taek | South Korea | 36 | 28 | DNF 47^{†} | 39 | 44 | 33 | 14 | 20 | 20 | 11 | – | 292 | 245 |
| 72 | Lars Pedersen | Denmark | 31 | 35 | DNF 47^{†} | 34 | 45 | 23 | 31 | 1 | BFD 46 | 8 | – | 301 | 254 |
| 73 | Eamon Robertshaw | Australia | 43^{†} | 43 | 38 | 43 | 32 | 16 | 21 | 30 | 4 | 36 | – | 306 | 263 |
| 74 | Gabriel Vicente Praça | Brazil | 35 | 36 | 33 | 36 | 28 | 37^{†} | 20 | 35 | 17 | 25 | – | 302 | 265 |
| 75 | Reneric Moreno | Philippines | 39 | 34 | 43^{†} | 38 | 27 | 27 | 27 | 26 | 31 | 24 | – | 316 | 273 |
| 76 | Mihovil Fantela | Croatia | 39 | 42 | 35 | 28 | 35 | 11 | 35 | OCS 46^{†} | BFD 46 | 17 | – | 334 | 288 |
| 77 | Carl Evans | New Zealand | 37 | DNF 47^{†} | 34 | 38 | OCS 47 | 14 | 29 | 21 | BFD 46 | 22 | – | 335 | 288 |
| 78 | Benjamin Barger | United States | OCS 47^{†} | 19 | 30 | 21 | 19 | DNC 46 | DNC 46 | DNC 46 | DPI 16 | DNS 46 | – | 336 | 289 |
| 79 | Aljaz Maslo | Slovenia | 36 | 39^{†} | 36 | 39 | 37 | 32 | 34 | 27 | 19 | 29 | – | 328 | 289 |
| 80 | Jun Ogawa | Japan | 38 | 39 | 41^{†} | 40 | 36 | 38 | 17 | 32 | 22 | 33 | – | 336 | 295 |
| 81 | Raja Qasim Abbas Rathore | Pakistan | 37 | 36 | DNF 47^{†} | 37 | 39 | 28 | 33 | 31 | 23 | 32 | – | 343 | 296 |
| 82 | Rihards Akmentins | Latvia | 44 | 41 | 31 | 36 | 37 | 29 | 26 | 29 | 33 | DNF 46^{†} | – | 352 | 306 |
| 83 | Justin Lord | Australia | 40 | 38 | 41 | 42 | 43 | 20 | DNF 46^{†} | 36 | 34 | 31 | – | 371 | 325 |
| 84 | Matías Canseco Bazo | Peru | 41 | 44^{†} | 39 | 41 | 41 | 34 | 30 | 38 | 27 | 34 | – | 369 | 325 |
| 85 | Sam Treharne | Australia | 40 | 40 | 40 | DNF 47^{†} | 39 | 40 | 24 | 40 | 29 | DNC 46 | – | 385 | 338 |
| 86 | Ahmed Hesham Ahmed | Egypt | DNC 47^{†} | DNC 47 | DNF 47 | 42 | 43 | 35 | 38 | 37 | 35 | 35 | – | 406 | 359 |
| 87 | Merrick Jun Yi Phang | Singapore | DNF 47^{†} | DNF 47 | DNF 47 | DNF 47 | 38 | 41 | 41 | 41 | 28 | 38 | – | 415 | 368 |
| 88 | Shuhei Iwayama | Japan | 41 | DNF 47^{†} | 39 | DNF 47 | 41 | 39 | 40 | 39 | BFD 46 | 37 | – | 416 | 369 |
| 89 | Oh Ji-hun | South Korea | 45 | DNF 47^{†} | 42 | DNF 47 | 42 | 36 | 36 | DNC 46 | 32 | DNC 46 | – | 419 | 372 |
| 90 | Veselin Nanev | Bulgaria | 30 | 27 | DNF 47^{†} | DNS 47 | DNC 47 | DNC 46 | DNC 46 | DNC 46 | DNC 46 | DNC 46 | – | 428 | 381 |
| 91 | Bakri Abdelrahman | Egypt | DNC 47^{†} | DNC 47 | DNF 47 | DNF 47 | DNF 47 | DNC 46 | 39 | 34 | BFD 46 | 39 | – | 439 | 392 |

Legend: – Qualified for medal race(s); BFD – Black flag disqualification; DNC – Did not come to the starting area; DNF – Did not finish; DNS – Did not start; DPI – Discretionary penalty imposed; OCS – On the course side of the starting line; † – Discarded race not counted in the overall result;
