= 2014 ISAF Sailing World Championships – Men's RS:X =

Men's RS:X at the 2014 ISAF Sailing World Championships
- Venue: Santander, Spain
- Dates: 12–18 September
- Competitors: 98 from 43 nations

Medalists
gold medal	Julien Bontemps	France
silver medal	Przemysław Miarczyński	Poland
bronze medal	Thomas Goyard	France

The men's RS:X class at the 2014 ISAF Sailing World Championships was held in Santander, Spain 13–19 September.

== Results ==
Results of individual races
Pos	Helmsman	Country	I	II	III	IV	V	VI	VII	VIII	IX	X	XI	MR	Tot	Pts
Gold medal	Julien Bontemps	France	4	3	5	7^{†}	3	3	1	1	4	2	4	4	41	34
Silver medal	Przemysław Miarczyński	Poland	2	7	8^{†}	2	6	2	5	4	7	5	7	DPI 8	63	55
Bronze medal	Thomas Goyard	France	19	30^{†}	3	3	2	5	2	2	9	3	10	2	90	60
4	Piotr Myszka	Poland	4	2	10	2	1	7	4	6	2	6	15^{†}	DPI 16	75	60
5	Nick Dempsey	Great Britain	5	6	1	4	3	11	20^{†}	19	13	4	2	10	98	78
6	Byron Kokkalanis	Greece	6	4	1	5	DPI 12	8	15^{†}	3	5	1	13	OCS 22	95	80
7	Dorian van Rijsselberghe	Netherlands	3	8	7	3	4	14	6	8	15	19^{†}	11	12	110	91
8	Kiran Badloe	Netherlands	2	5	10	17	7	9	9	11	8	31^{†}	14	8	131	100
9	Louis Giard	France	1	3	11	8	8	6	10	12	11	9	27^{†}	OCS 22	128	101
10	Pierre Le Coq	France	1	1	DSQ 50^{†}	10	1	15	21	13	6	14	1	OCS 22	155	105
11	Nimrod Mashiah	Israel	8	33	7	12	36^{†}	1	17	5	3	7	3	–	132	96
12	Toni Wilhelm	Germany	3	4	3	5	22	18	8	9	DNS 50^{†}	10	21	–	153	103
13	Iván Pastor	Spain	11	2	4	14	17	12	11	16	16	26^{†}	12	–	141	115
14	Paweł Tarnowski	Poland	13	5	20	28	29^{†}	17	7	7	1	13	6	–	146	117
15	Ricardo Santos	Brazil	7	1	14	12	12	28^{†}	28	18	12	18	9	–	159	131
16	JP Tobin	New Zealand	9	10	9	4	24	4	3	RET 50^{†}	29	12	30	–	184	134
17	Wang Aichen	China	9	13	6	1	5	37^{†}	35	26	10	20	26	–	188	151
18	Sebastian Fleischer	Denmark	15	25	4	7	10	22	13	14	RET 50^{†}	24	24	–	208	158
19	Joe Bennett	Great Britain	23	27	14	8	18	10	12	34^{†}	24	8	17	–	195	161
20	Andreas Cariolou	Cyprus	10	OCS 50^{†}	5	10	31	16	16	10	RET 50	11	8	–	217	167
21	Joan Cardona	Spain	15	18	19	13	25^{†}	24	24	15	22	15	5	–	195	170
22	Mariano Reutemann	Argentina	14	6	12	22	13	21	19	20	23	34^{†}	28	–	212	178
23	Juozas Bernotas	Lithuania	12	23	22	23	23	25^{†}	14	17	14	17	18	–	208	183
24	Daniele Benedetti	Italy	16	11	19	15	26	29^{†}	18	23	17	23	16	–	213	184
25	Max Oberemko	Russia	10	OCS 50^{†}	12	13	11	32	23	24	18	29	19	–	241	191
26	Makoto Tomizawa	Japan	20	15	11	11	7	35^{†}	22	22	30	25	33	–	231	196
27	Mattia Camboni	Italy	6	7	DPI 12	9	9	38^{†}	30	29	32	38	29	–	239	201
28	Sebastian Wang-Hansen	Norway	7	16	24	16	39^{†}	13	27	27	21	21	31	–	242	203
29	Tom Squires	Great Britain	5	10	15	19	20	27	33	28	RET 50^{†}	27	25	–	259	209
30	João Rodrigues	Portugal	14	8	18	17	17	36^{†}	26	21	27	32	34	–	250	214
31	Sam Sills	Great Britain	17	35^{†}	13	27	19	33	25	25	25	16	20	–	255	220
32	Mateo Sanz Lanz	Switzerland	11	9	8	11	10	34	46^{†}	38	28	41	32	–	268	222
33	Michael Cheng	Hong Kong	23	16	16	6	4	26	32	35	33	37	39^{†}	–	267	228
34	Bautista Saubidet Birkner	Argentina	24	26	15	25	16	19	29	31	20	28	37^{†}	–	270	233
35	Marcantonio Baglione	Italy	12	20	25	16	27	40	44^{†}	33	19	22	23	–	281	237
36	Adam Holm	Sweden	18	24	29	20	15	20	31	30	34^{†}	30	22	–	273	239
37	Jérôme Pasquette	France	18	12	17	20	26	30	39^{†}	32	36	36	36	–	302	263
38	Federico Esposito	Italy	29	12	20	30	12	23	36	37	37	35	41^{†}	–	312	271
39	Liu Chunzhuang	China	16	9	2	1	13	47	DNF 50^{†}	RET 50	43	47	47	–	325	275
40	Piotr Nowacki	Poland	21	14	6	9	19	41	45	43	35	46^{†}	44	–	323	277
41	Marcin Urbanowicz	Poland	17	13	26	28	8	31	43	36	39	45^{†}	43	–	329	284
42	Aleksandr Askerov	Russia	33	14	21	24	6	39	42	DNF 50^{†}	26	42	42	–	339	289
43	Albert de Carvalho	Brazil	21	29	17	26	9	42^{†}	41	40	31	39	40	–	335	293
44	David Mier	Mexico	22	17	26	21	21	43	40	44^{†}	40	33	35	–	342	298
45	Kieran Holmes Martin	Great Britain	28	21	13	18	14	44	37	42	42	40	46^{†}	–	345	299
46	Amir Galili	Israel	20	11	24	18	21	46^{†}	38	39	41	43	45	–	346	300
47	Alistair Masters	Great Britain	26	19	27	38	11	45^{†}	34	41	38	44	38	–	361	316
48	Yann Dupont	France	8	25	21	26	15	DNF 50^{†}	DNF 50	DNF 50	DNF 50	DNF 50	DNF 50	–	395	345
49	Toni Bonet Macias	Spain	34	21	9	14	35	DNF 50^{†}	DNF 50	DNF 50	DNF 50	DNF 50	DNF 50	–	413	363
50	Luka Mratović	Croatia	13	41^{†}	23	23	34	5	2	6	3	–	–	–	150	109
51	Zachary Plavsic	Canada	30	15	35	39^{†}	5	6	3	5	10	–	–	–	148	109
52	Juan Manuel Moreno Vega	Spain	25	28	29^{†}	19	14	16	6	4	15	–	–	–	156	127
53	Dmitrii Polishchuk	Russia	40^{†}	34	34	25	23	2	5	3	9	–	–	–	175	135
54	Michalis Malekkides	Cyprus	30	38	22	24	45^{†}	4	21	1	2	–	–	–	187	142
55	Connor Bainbridge	Great Britain	42	35	31	31	44^{†}	1	1	2	1	–	–	–	188	144
56	Áron Gádorfalvi	Hungary	39^{†}	31	27	15	22	23	25	8	4	–	–	–	194	155
57	Daniel Flores	Venezuela	24	24	36	31	41^{†}	15	8	11	7	–	–	–	197	156
58	András Nikl	Hungary	25	22	30	38^{†}	30	10	11	15	17	–	–	–	198	160
59	Borja Carracedo Serra	Spain	19	31^{†}	28	29	25	8	24	12	16	–	–	–	192	161
60	Artem Javadav	Belarus	33	27	18	36^{†}	16	12	19	20	22	–	–	–	203	167
61	Oleksandr Tugaryev	Ukraine	27	18	36	21	45^{†}	7	12	16	31	–	–	–	213	168
62	Artem Murashev	Russia	31	20	33^{†}	30	20	26	15	18	11	–	–	–	204	171
63	Sergi Escandell Marí	Spain	26	22	16	22	27^{†}	25	16	19	25	–	–	–	198	171
64	Karel Lavický	Czech Republic	22	37	38^{†}	37	38	18	9	9	5	–	–	–	213	175
65	Johannes Ahun	Estonia	37	38	40	44	46^{†}	3	4	7	6	–	–	–	225	179
66	Mihovil Fantela	Croatia	35	29	40^{†}	35	31	13	7	17	12	–	–	–	219	179
67	Kim Hyung-kwon	South Korea	32	OCS 50^{†}	23	6	39	11	31	30	13	–	–	–	235	185
68	Santiago Grillo	Colombia	32	36	37^{†}	32	35	14	10	14	14	–	–	–	224	187
69	Mikita Tsirkun	Belarus	31	26	25	27	18	19	17	28	32^{†}	–	–	–	223	191
70	Evgeny Ayvazyan	Russia	28	19	28	29	32^{†}	17	23	25	23	–	–	–	224	192
71	Gabriel Bastos Pereira	Brazil	41^{†}	39	38	40	29	22	14	10	8	–	–	–	241	200
72	Yuma Itabisashi	Japan	34	23	32	32	38^{†}	21	20	22	18	–	–	–	240	202
73	Carson Crain	United States	27	17	37^{†}	36	28	24	26	29	24	–	–	–	248	211
74	Elia Colombo	Switzerland	44^{†}	44	42	44	43	9	13	13	20	–	–	–	272	228
75	Martynas Juodeska	Lithuania	29	32	33	41	42^{†}	27	18	27	26	–	–	–	275	233
76	Joris van Essen	Netherlands	36	41	47^{†}	46	37	30	22	23	19	–	–	–	301	254
77	Raul Lopez	United States	38	32	41^{†}	40	32	28	30	33	21	–	–	–	295	254
78	Ignacio Berenguer	Mexico	36	33	31	34	33	31	33	24	37^{†}	–	–	–	292	255
79	Robert York	Great Britain	45^{†}	34	32	34	41	20	34	31	34	–	–	–	305	260
80	Jose Cantero Reina	Spain	46^{†}	40	39	39	42	35	27	21	27	–	–	–	316	270
81	Tomas Vieito	Spain	35	28	46^{†}	45	30	36	36	32	33	–	–	–	321	275
82	Waleed Al-Kindi	Oman	41	36	41	48^{†}	34	29	28	39	28	–	–	–	324	276
83	Daiya Kuramochi	Japan	37	37	30	33	28	43^{†}	38	35	38	–	–	–	319	276
84	Pedro Pascual	United States	39	30	35	37	24	40^{†}	37	37	39	–	–	–	318	278
85	Daniel Blinnikka	Finland	43	40	39	42	40	32	29	26	DSQ 50^{†}	–	–	–	341	291
86	Mohanad Ismail	Egypt	38	39	42	45^{†}	33	33	40	38	30	–	–	–	338	293
87	Hamza Bouras	Algeria	40	43	34	33	36	41	44^{†}	42	35	–	–	–	348	304
88	Aly Sultan	Egypt	45^{†}	45	43	43	43	37	32	34	36	–	–	–	358	313
89	Sinan Şenevrensel	Turkey	42	42	44^{†}	41	37	34	35	41	41	–	–	–	357	313
90	Rihards Akmentins	Latvia	46^{†}	45	43	43	40	39	39	36	40	–	–	–	371	325
91	Sean Kelly	United States	48^{†}	46	48	42	44	42	42	40	29	–	–	–	381	333
92	Rainer Kasekivi	Estonia	43	43	OCS 50^{†}	35	47	44	41	43	DNF 50	–	–	–	396	346
93	Kristaps Keidāns	Latvia	44	42	44	47	46	38	43	44	DNF 50^{†}	–	–	–	398	348
94	Brian Wilson	Great Britain	47	44	45	46	47	DNF 50^{†}	DNF 50	DNF 50	DNF 50	–	–	–	429	379
95	Zoran Mitreski	North Macedonia	49	48	46	48	DNF 50^{†}	45	DNF 50	DNF 50	DNF 50	–	–	–	436	386
96	Johan Ekstedt	Sweden	47	47	45	47	DNF 50^{†}	DNF 50	DNF 50	DNF 50	DNF 50	–	–	–	436	386
97	Neel Vora	Kenya	DNF 50^{†}	DNF 50	49	49	DNF 50	DNF 50	DNS 50	DNS 50	DNF 50	–	–	–	448	398
98	Chuankun Shi	China	DNF 50^{†}	DNF 50	DNF 50	DNF 50	DNF 50	DNF 50	DNF 50	DNF 50	DNF 50	–	–	–	450	400

Scoring system: low-point system; Source:
Legend: – Qualified for medal race(s); DNF – Did not finish; DNS – Did not start; DSQ – Disqualified; OCS – On the course side of the starting line; RET – Retired; † – Discarded race not counted in the overall result;
