= Sailing at the 2016 Summer Olympics – Men's RS:X =

Men's RS:X at the Games of the XXXI Olympiad
- Line drawing of the RS:X
- Venue: Marina da Glória
- Dates: 8–14 August
- Competitors: 36 from 36 nations
- Winning total: 25.0 points

Medalists
1st place, gold medalist(s)		Dorian van Rijsselberghe	Netherlands
2nd place, silver medalist(s)		Nick Dempsey	Great Britain
3rd place, bronze medalist(s)		Pierre Le Coq	France

The men's RS:X was a sailing event on the Sailing at the 2016 Summer Olympics program in Rio de Janeiro that took place between 8–14 August at Marina da Glória. 13 races (the last one a medal race) were scheduled and completed. As in the previous Olympics, the Dutch sailor Dorian van Rijsselberghe dominated and had won the gold medal before the medal race was held, as long as he competed in it. As it happened, he won the medal race as well. Britain's Nick Dempsey was likewise guaranteed the silver medal before the medal race, a medal he also won in 2012. In contrast, the race for the bronze medal was very tight, with Pierre Le Coq edging out Piotr Myszka by one position in the medal race.

The medals were presented by Barbara Kendall, IOC member, New Zealand and Nazli Imre, Vice President of World Sailing.

== Schedule ==
Mon 8 Aug	Tue 9 Aug	Wed 10 Aug	Thu 11 Aug	Fri 12 Aug	Sat 13 Aug	Sun 14 Aug
Race 1 Race 2 Race 3	Race 4 Race 5 Race 6	Rest day	Race 7 Race 8 Race 9	Race 10; Race 11; Race 12	Rest day	Medal race

== Results ==
Results of individual races
Pos	Helmsman	Country	I	II	III	IV	V	VI	VII	VIII	IX	X	XI	XII	MR	Tot	Pts
Gold medal	Dorian van Rijsselberghe	Netherlands	5	3	1	4	1	1	4	1	1	1	1	6^{†}	2	31.0	25.0
Silver medal	Nick Dempsey	Great Britain	1	1	2	1	4	RDG 8^{†}	2	5	8	5	7	8	8	60.0	52.0
Bronze medal	Pierre Le Coq	France	7	7	12	6	3	2	8	10	17^{†}	2	3	12	14	103.0	86.0
4	Piotr Myszka	Poland	4	5	5	2	2	3	12	2	6	13	16^{†}	16	18	104.0	88.0
5	Byron Kokkalanis	Greece	2	2	6	13^{†}	5	5	5	8	12	12	11	10	DPI 18	109.0	96.0
6	Toni Wilhelm	Germany	8	4	13	10	9	4	1	7	19^{†}	7	8	19	10	119.0	100.0
7	Ricardo Santos	Brazil	6	9	7	3	16	30^{†}	21	9	9	6	9	11	12	148.0	118.0
8	Michael Cheng	Hong Kong	3	6	11	5	6	16	9	13	13	21	17	26^{†}	6	152.0	126.0
9	Iván Pastor	Spain	17	19	10	7	7	UFD 37^{†}	11	22	16	9	2	3	4	164.0	127.0
10	Mattia Camboni	Italy	11	13	4	UFD 37^{†}	DNF 37	9	10	21	3	3	5	1	20	174.0	137.0
11	João Rodrigues	Portugal	21	10	23^{†}	15	15	10	15	12	4	4	12	17		148.0	125.0
12	Sebastian Fleischer	Denmark	15	14	9	12	22^{†}	11	17	20	2	11	6	18		157.0	135.0
13	Wang Aichen	China	16	18	8	18	19^{†}	15	6	4	15	10	10	15		154.0	135.0
14	Mateo Sanz Lanz	Switzerland	24^{†}	15	21	8	14	8	20	11	11	19	4	5		160.0	136.0
15	Makoto Tomizawa	Japan	10	8	18	19	13	22^{†}	7	14	18	15	14	2		160.0	138.0
16	Maksym Oberemko	Russia	27^{†}	25	14	24	17	13	3	3	10	8	13	9		166.0	139.0
17	Shahar Tzuberi	Israel	9	17	20	22	DNF 37^{†}	18	19	6	7	17	21	4		197.0	160.0
18	Lee Tae-hoon	South Korea	14	20	3	9	18	7	33^{†}	17	27	14	22	14		198.0	165.0
19	Andreas Cariolou	Cyprus	12	12	16	23	10	6	18	27^{†}	23	22	19	20		208.0	181.0
20	David Mier	Mexico	28	21	22	26	21	17	32^{†}	15	5	16	15	21		239.0	207.0
21	Bautista Saubidet Birkner	Argentina	20	16	19	17	12	23	14	25	24	18	29^{†}	22		239.0	210.0
22	Mikita Tsirkun	Belarus	23	27	25	16	8	32^{†}	16	19	22	24	18	17		247.0	215.0
23	Oleksandr Tugaryev	Ukraine	22	31	27	11	DNF 37^{†}	12	13	16	30	20	30	13		262.0	225.0
24	Luka Mratović	Croatia	13	11	15	21	DNF 37^{†}	19	27	18	34	26	31	30		282.0	245.0
25	Áron Gádorfalvi	Hungary	30	28	29	25	20	20	25	DNF 37^{†}	26	27	24	23		314.0	277.0
26	Juozas Bernotas	Lithuania	19	23	17	29	DNF 37^{†}	14	26	DNF 37	21	UFD 37	26	29		315.0	278.0
27	Daniel Flores	Venezuela	18	22	26	20	11	33	34	DNF 37^{†}	32	UFD 37	23	25		318.0	281.0
28	Pedro Pascual	United States	25	26	28	28	DNF 37^{†}	28	22	26	28	23	20	32		323.0	286.0
29	Natthaphong Phonoppharat	Thailand	32	29	32	14	DNF 37^{†}	21	30	24	25	25	28	27		324.0	287.0
30	Santiago Grillo	Colombia	29	24	24	32	DNF 37^{†}	24	28	23	14	29	35	DNF 37		336.0	299.0
31	Karel Lavický	Czech Republic	26	30	30	30	DNF 37^{†}	25	24	DNF 37	29	DNF 37	25	31		361.0	324.0
32	Chang Hao	Chinese Taipei	34	34	31	27	DNF 37^{†}	34	35	DNF 37	31	28	27	28		383.0	346.0
33	Jean-Marc Gardette	Seychelles	36	35	33	31	23	31	29	DNF 37^{†}	35	DNF 37	32	33		392.0	355.0
34	Leonard Ong	Singapore	33	33	35	33	DNF 37^{†}	27	36	DNF 37	20	DNF 37	34	DNF 37		399.0	362.0
35	Onur Cavit Biriz	Turkey	31	32	UFD 37^{†}	34	DNF 37	29	23	DNF 37	33	DNF 37	33	DNF 37		400.0	363.0
36	Hamza Bouras	Algeria	35	36	34	35	DNF 37^{†}	26	31	DNF 37	36	DNF 37	36	24		404.0	367.0

Legend: – Qualified for medal race(s); DNF – Did not finish; DPI – Discretionary penalty imposed; RDG – Redress given; UFD – "U" flag disqualification; † – Discarded race not counted in the overall result;
