= Sailing at the 2012 Summer Olympics – Men's RS:X =

Men's RS:X at the Games of the XXX Olympiad
- Line drawing of the RS-X
- Venue: Weymouth and Portland National Sailing Academy
- Dates: 31 July – 7 August
- Competitors: 38 from 38 nations

Medalists
1st place, gold medalist(s)		Dorian van Rijsselberghe	Netherlands
2nd place, silver medalist(s)		Nick Dempsey	Great Britain
3rd place, bronze medalist(s)		Przemysław Miarczyński	Poland

The men's RS:X was a sailing event on the Sailing at the 2012 Summer Olympics program in Weymouth and Portland National Sailing Academy. Eleven races (last one a medal race) were scheduled and completed. 38 sailors, on 38 boards, from 38 nations competed. Ten boards qualified for the medal race on course area Nothe in front of Weymouth, where each position scored double points. The gold medal was won by Dorian van Rijsselberghe who already after the ninth race had accumulated sufficient results to be certain to win the gold medal, as long as he competed in the races.

== Schedule ==
●	Practice race	●	Race on Portland	●	Race on Nothe	●	Race on West	●	Medal race on Nothe

Date	July						August											
Date	26 Thu	27 Fri	28 Sat	29 Sun	30 Mon	31 Tue	1 Wed	2 Thu	3 Fri	4 Sat	5 Sun	6 Mon	7 Tue	8 Wed	9 Thu	10 Fri	11 Sat	12 Sun
Men's RS:X					●	2	2	2	Spare day	2	2	Spare day	MR					

== Course areas and course configurations ==
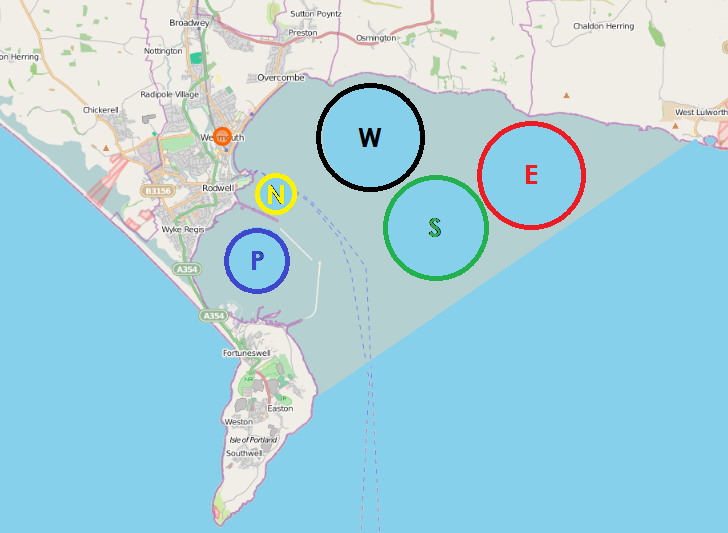
Course areas: Portland (P) Nothe (N) West (W) / South (S) East (E)

For the RS:X course areas Portland, Nothe, and West were used. The location (50° 35.19’ N, 02° 26.54’ W) points to the center Portland course area, the location (50° 36.18’ N 02° 25.98’ W) points to the center of the Nothe course area and the location (50° 37.18’ N 02° 23.55’ W) points to the center of the West course area. The target time for the course was 30 minutes for the races and 20 minutes for the medal race. The race management could choose from many course configurations.

== Results ==
Results of individual races
Pos	Helmsman	Country	I	II	III	IV	V	VI	VII	VIII	IX	X	MR	Tot	Pts
Gold medal	Dorian van Rijsselberghe	Netherlands	1	1	1	3	1	2	1	2	1	DNF 39^{†}	2	54.0	15.0
Silver medal	Nick Dempsey	Great Britain	5	7	5	1	10^{†}	1	2	3	9	2	6	51.0	41.0
Bronze medal	Przemysław Miarczyński	Poland	2	2	7	4	13^{†}	3	7	4	13	10	8	73.0	60.0
4	Toni Wilhelm	Germany	3	3	4	9	2	5	6	1	15^{†}	13	18	79.0	64.0
5	Julien Bontemps	France	23^{†}	14	2	5	5	4	17	5	8	6	4	93.0	70.0
6	Byron Kokkalanis	Greece	4	11	6	2	16^{†}	15	3	11	4	9	12	93.0	77.0
7	JP Tobin	New Zealand	15	4	3	7	8	8	12	6	17^{†}	17	16	113.0	96.0
8	Zachary Plavsic	Canada	6	12	12	6	4	17	9	7	7	29^{†}	20	129.0	100.0
9	Ricardo Santos	Brazil	14	9	8	21	14	22^{†}	4	10	5	18	10	135.0	113.0
10	Richard Stauffacher	Switzerland	10	27^{†}	14	15	6	18	20	8	10	12	14	148.0	127.0
11	Mariano Reutemann	Argentina	16	15	15	13	12	19	5	20^{†}	14	7		136.0	116.0
12	Juozas Bernotas	Lithuania	9	13	13	8	9	13	11	17	27^{†}	27		147.0	120.0
13	Ho Tsun Andy Leung	Hong Kong	11	18	28^{†}	12	15	10	13	9	16	21		153.0	125.0
14	João Rodrigues	Portugal	20	16	9	11	23	7	25^{†}	22	20	3		156.0	131.0
15	Lee Tae-hoon	South Korea	8	6	21	17	25	9	21	13	31^{†}	19		170.0	139.0
16	Iván Pastor	Spain	22	24	20	OCS 37^{†}	19	25	8	25	2	5		189.0	150.0
17	Andreas Cariolou	Cyprus	13	26	10	27	11	30^{†}	16	12	12	23		180.0	150.0
18	Wang Aichen	China	21	23	18	19	3	23	10	27^{†}	22	14		180.0	153.0
19	Shahar Tzuberi	Israel	12	8	17	10	BFD 39^{†}	12	35	34	26	1		194.0	155.0
20	Dmitry Polishchuk	Russia	17	5	19	24	27	6	15	26	DNF 39^{†}	28		206.0	167.0
21	Luka Mratović	Croatia	24	19	26	20	22	11	14	16	18	36^{†}		206.0	170.0
22	Robert Willis	United States	7	10	11	25	BFD 39^{†}	28	24	33	11	30		218.0	179.0
23	Maksym Oberemko	Ukraine	36^{†}	35	16	28	17	31	23	14	6	11		217.0	181.0
24	Sebastian Wang-Hansen	Norway	19	17	31	18	18	20	19	18	25	32^{†}		217.0	185.0
25	Áron Gádorfalvi	Hungary	34	33	DNF 39^{†}	22	7	21	18	24	3	25		226.0	187.0
26	Yoan Kolev	Bulgaria	29	31	DNE 39	16	20	35^{†}	26	19	19	8		242.0	207.0
27	Mikalai Zhukavets	Belarus	26	22	23	14	26	16	27	21	DNF 39^{†}	33		247.0	208.0
28	Makoto Tomizawa	Japan	25	25	25	29	24	26	34^{†}	30	21	4		243.0	209.0
29	Sebastian Fleischer	Denmark	18	28	24	23	29^{†}	29	29	15	28	26		249.0	220.0
30	Johannes Ahun	Estonia	27	20	22	DPI 31	31	14	22	28	DNF 39^{†}	35		270.0	231.0
31	Daniel Flores	Venezuela	37^{†}	37	29	31	30	24	32	29	23	16		289.0	252.0
32	David Mier	Mexico	32	27	30	35^{†}	28	27	28	32	30	20		289.0	254.0
33	Ek Boonsawad	Thailand	28	32	27	26	21	32	31	23	DNF 39^{†}	34		293.0	254.0
34	Federico Esposito	Italy	31	30	33	30	32	36^{†}	33	35	29	15		305.0	269.0
35	Chang Hao	Chinese Taipei	33	36	35	36	33	33	37^{†}	37	24	22		326.0	289.0
36	Karel Lavický	Czech Republic	30	29	32	34	BFD 39^{†}	34	36	31	DNF 39	31		335.0	296.0
37	Santiago Grillo	Colombia	35	34	34	33	BFD 39^{†}	37	30	36	DNF 39	24		341.0	302.0
38	Ahmed Habash	Egypt	38	38	36	37	34	38	38	38	DNF 39^{†}	37		373.0	334.0

Scoring system: low-point system; Source:
Legend: – Qualified for medal race(s); DNF – Did not finish; DPI – Discretionary penalty imposed; OCS – On the course side of the starting line; † – Discarded race not counted in the overall result;

== Daily standings ==
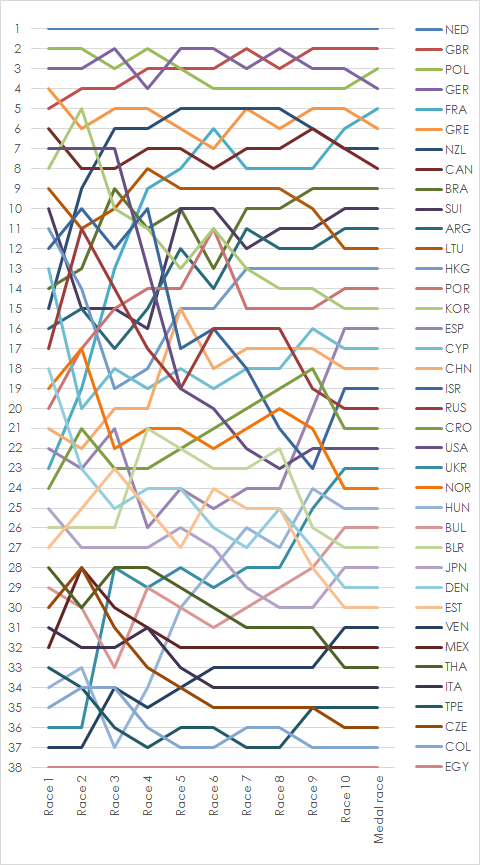
Graph showing the daily standings in the Men's RS:X during the 2012 Summer Olympics
