= Sailing at the 2008 Summer Olympics – Men's RS:X =

Men's RS:X at the Games of the XXIX Olympiad
- Line drawing of the RS-X
- Venue: Qingdao International Sailing Centre
- Dates: First race: 11 August 2008; Last race: 20 August 2008
- Competitors: 35 from 35 nations

Medalists
1st place, gold medalist(s)		Tom Ashley	New Zealand
2nd place, silver medalist(s)		Julien Bontemps	France
3rd place, bronze medalist(s)		Shahar Tzuberi	Israel

The Men's RS:X was a sailing event on the Sailing at the 2008 Summer Olympics program in Qingdao International Sailing Centre. Eleven races (last one a medal race) were scheduled and completed. 35 sailors, on 35 boards, from 35 nations competed. Ten boards qualified for the medal race.

== Race schedule ==
●	Practice race	●	Race on Yellow	●	Race on Red	●	Medal race on Yellow

Date	August																	
Date	7 Thu	8 Fri	9 Sat	10 Sun	11 Mon	12 Tue	13 Wed	14 Thu	15 Fri	16 Sat	17 Sun	18 Mon	19 Tue	20 Wed	21 Thu	22 Fri	23 Sat	24 Sun
Men's RS:X				●	S1,2	S3,4	Res	No wind	S5	No wind	S6,7	S8,9	S10	MR				

== Course areas and course configurations ==
For the RS:X course areas A (Yellow) and B (Red) were used. The location (36°1'26"’N, 120°26'52"E) points to the center of the 0.6nm radius Yellow course area and the location (36°2'21"N, 120°25'32"E) points to the center of the 0.6nm radius Red course area. The target time for the course was about 30–35 minutes for the races and 20 minutes for the medal race. The race management could choose from several course configurations.

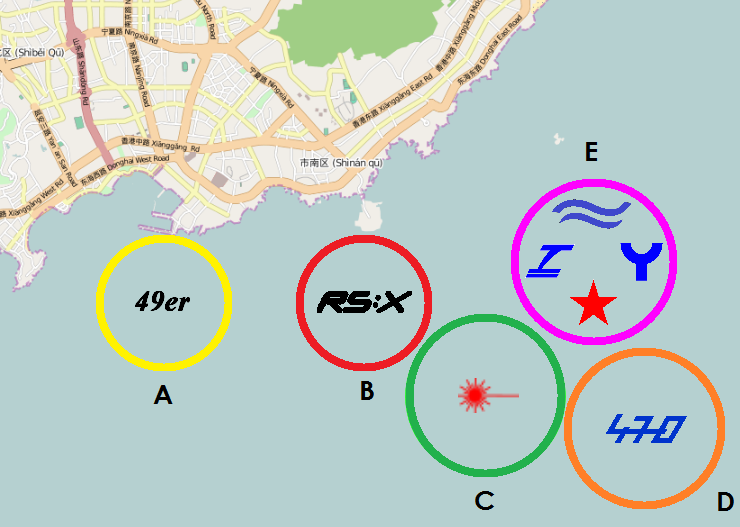
Course Areas

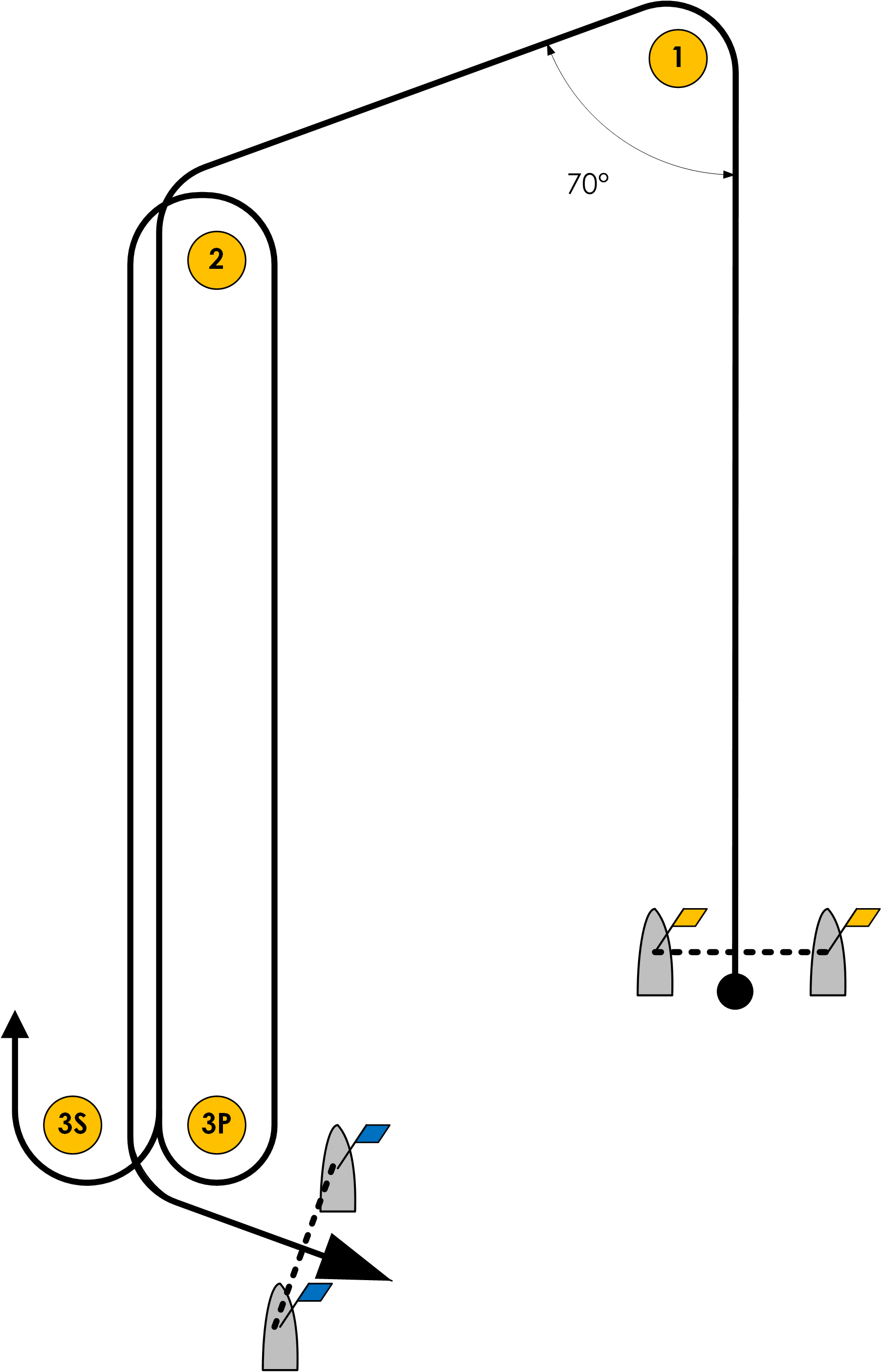
70° Trapezoid Outer Course (O)

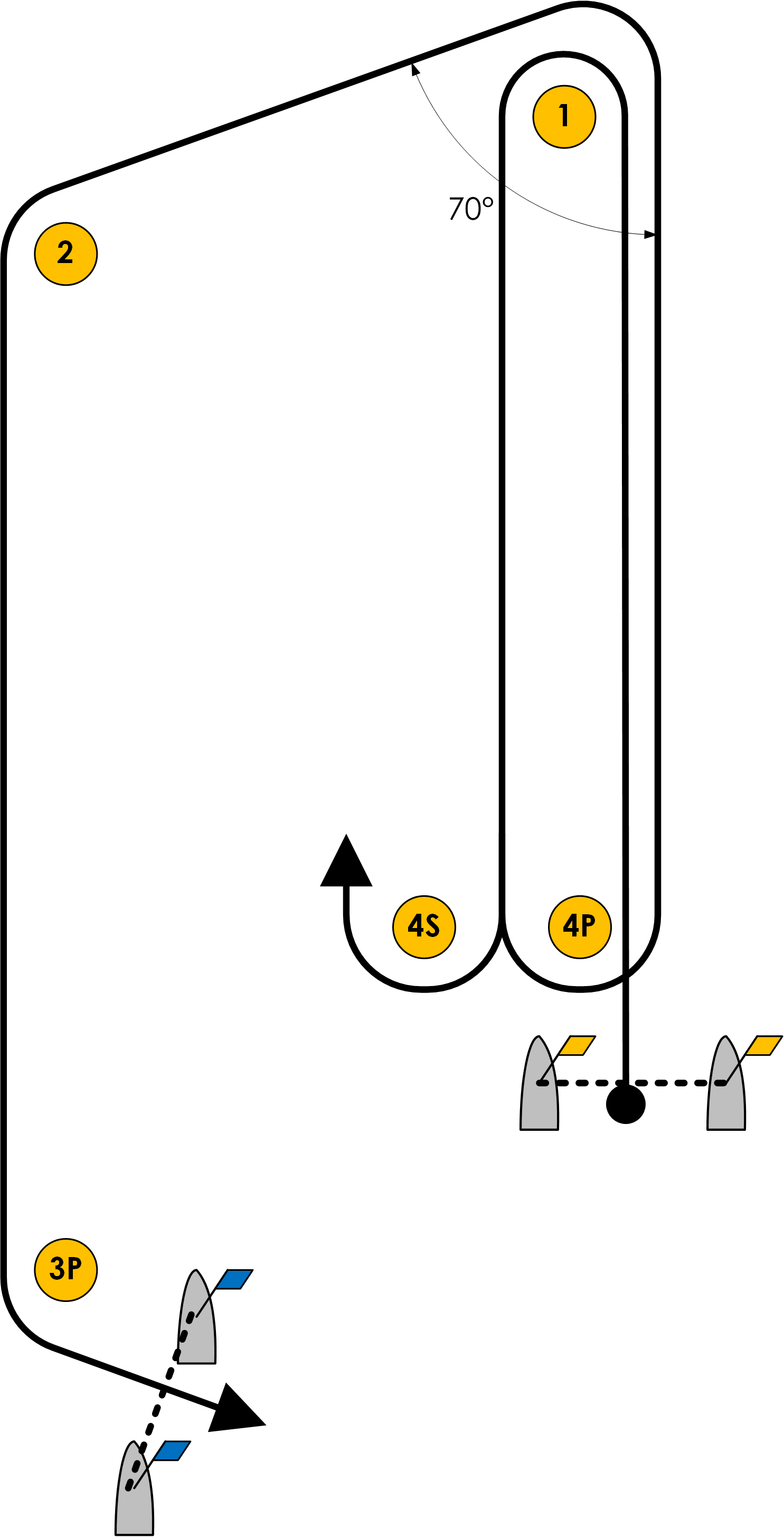
70° Trapezoid Inner Course (I)

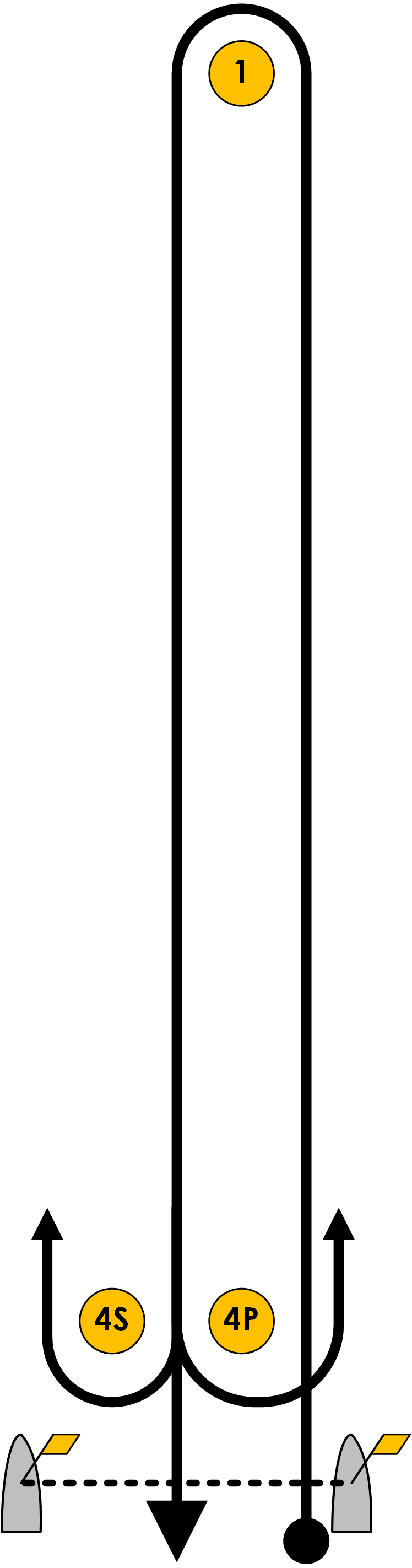
Windward - Leeward Course (W)

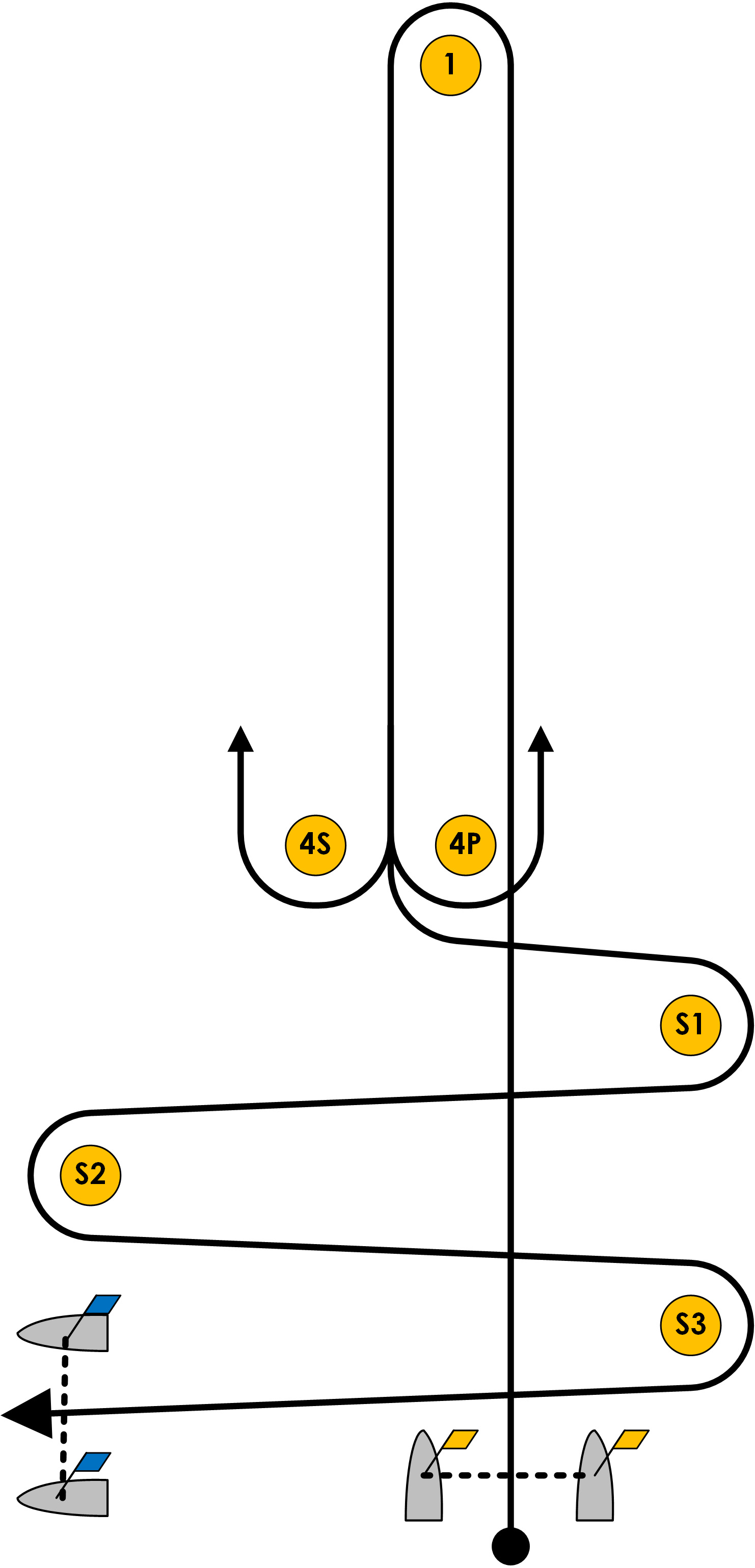
Windward-Leeward Slalom Course (WS)

=== Outer courses ===
- O1: START – 1 – 2 – 3s/3p – 2 – 3p – FINISH
- O2: START – 1 – 2 – 3s/3p – 2 – 3s/3p – 2 – 3p – FINISH
- O3: START – 1 – 2 – 3s/3p – 2 – 3s/3p – 2 – 3s/3p – 2 – 3p – FINISH

=== Inner courses ===
- I1: START – 1 – 4s/4p – 1 – 2 – 3p – FINISH
- I2: START – 1 – 4s/4p – 1 – 4s/4p – 1 – 2 – 3p – FINISH
- I3: START – 1 – 4s/4p – 1 – 4s/4p – 1 – 4s/4p – 1 – 2 – 3p – FINISH

=== Windward-Leeward courses ===
- W2: START – 1 – 4s/4p – 1 – FINISH
- W3: START – 1 – 4s/4p – 1 – 4s/4p – 1 – FINISH
- W4: START – 1 – 4s/4p – 1 – 4s/4p – 1 – 4s/4p – 1 – FINISH

=== Windward-Leeward Slalom courses ===
- WS1: START – 1 – 4s/4p – S1 – S2 – S3 – FINISH
- WS2: START – 1 – 4s/4p – 1 – 4s/4p – S1 – S2 – S3 – FINISH
- WS3: START – 1 – 4s/4p – 1 – 4s/4p – 1 – 4s/4p – S1 – S2 – S3 – FINISH

== Weather conditions ==
In the lead up to the Olympics many questioned the choice of Qingdao as a venue with very little predicted wind. During the races the wind was pretty light and quite unpredictable. Due to lack of wind (< 1.6 knots) two racing days had to be postponed.

== Final results ==
Results of individual races
Pos	Helmsman	Country	I	II	III	IV	V	VI	VII	VIII	IX	X	MR	Tot	Pts
Gold medal	Tom Ashley	New Zealand	4	7	7	1	5	5	3	6	8	32^{†}	3	84.0	52.0
Silver medal	Julien Bontemps	France	13^{†}	1	5	4	10	8	2	10	2	3	4	66.0	53.0
Bronze medal	Shahar Tzuberi	Israel	1	3	1	3	17	6	19^{†}	18	1	4	2	77.0	58.0
4	Nick Dempsey	Great Britain	11	9	3	2	1	7	17^{†}	5	3	5	7	77.0	66.0
5	Ricardo Santos	Brazil	12	6	13	7	6	3	6	7	5	33^{†}	6	110.0	77.0
6	Chan King Yin	Hong Kong	5	4	2	5	3	33^{†}	21	27	7	8	1	117.0	84.0
7	Wang Aichen	China	2	8	9	16	2	14	22^{†}	14	7	8	1	117.0	95.0
8	Nikolaos Kaklamanakis	Greece	10	2	12	11	8	10	5	15	10	7	OCS 22	112.0	97.0
9	Iván Pastor	Spain	8	13	18^{†}	18	16	9	4	4	6	15	8	127.0	109.0
10	Makoto Tomizawa	Japan	6	20	6	14	7	23	8	DSQ 36^{†}	12	2	9	152.0	116.0
11	João Rodrigues	Portugal	18	10	10	8	14	16	9	3	13	19^{†}		120.0	101.0
12	Maksym Oberemko	Ukraine	3	16	4	9	13	11	24	DSQ 36^{†}	11	12		139.0	103.0
13	Andreas Cariolou	Cyprus	7	17	14	10	11	17	11	19^{†}	14	10		130.0	111.0
14	Richard Stauffacher	Switzerland	9	11	11	13	9	18	15	8	17	22^{†}		133.0	111.0
15	Casper Bouman	Netherlands	20	27^{†}	21	22	4	1	1	2	20	21		139.0	112.0
16	Przemysław Miarczyński	Poland	17	21	27^{†}	20	15	2	7	1	15	18		143.0	116.0
17	David Mier	Mexico	16	5	17	6	12	29^{†}	23	21	4	25		158.0	129.0
18	Lee Tae-hoon	South Korea	22^{†}	14	20	15	20	25	13	11	9	9		158.0	133.0
19	Áron Gádorfalvi	Hungary	15	19	16	12	24	26^{†}	10	9	18	13		162.0	136.0
20	Fabian Heidegger	Italy	14	12	8	17	18	13	18	24^{†}	21	17		162.0	138.0
21	Mariano Reutemann	Argentina	25	18	19	23^{†}	25	15	16	16	16	20		193.0	168.0
22	Ertuğrul İçingir	Turkey	DSQ 36^{†}	28	15	19	27	19	12	23	23	6		208.0	172.0
23	Zachary Plavsic	Canada	23	25	22	21	30^{†}	12	26	12	29	11		211.0	181.0
24	Jonas Kældsø Poulsen	Denmark	28	26	30	29	35^{†}	4	14	13	34	23		236.0	201.0
25	Ek Boonsawad	Thailand	19	15	28	25	19	24	33^{†}	20	27	26		236.0	203.0
26	Benjamin Barger	United States	21	22	24	26	26	32	25	17	25	31^{†}		249.0	217.0
27	Oka Sulaksana	Indonesia	24	24	23	27	22	31	28	30	DNF 36^{†}	16		261.0	225.0
28	Mikalai Zhukavets	Belarus	27	23	26	24	29	21	32^{†}	26	26	27		261.0	229.0
29	Carlos Julio Flores	Venezuela	32	33	33	35^{†}	21	22	27	28	22	14		267.0	232.0
30	Patrik Pollák	Slovakia	26	30	25	30	23	28	31^{†}	29	28	24		274.0	243.0
31	Chang Hao	Chinese Taipei	31	29	31	28	28	20	34	DNF 36^{†}	24	35		296.0	260.0
32	Luka Mratović	Croatia	29	32	34^{†}	33	34	34	20	22	32	29		299.0	265.0
33	Johannes Ahun	Estonia	34^{†}	34	32	34	31	30	29	25	30	28		307.0	273.0
34	Alexey Tokarev	Russia	33	31	35^{†}	32	32	27	30	31	33	30		314.0	279.0
35	Santiago Grillo	Colombia	30	35	29	31	33	35	35	DNF 36^{†}	31	34		314.0	279.0

Scoring system: low-point system;
Legend: – Qualified for medal race(s); DNF – Did not finish; DPI – Discretionary penalty imposed; OCS – On the course side of the starting line; † – Discarded race not counted in the overall result;

== Daily standings ==
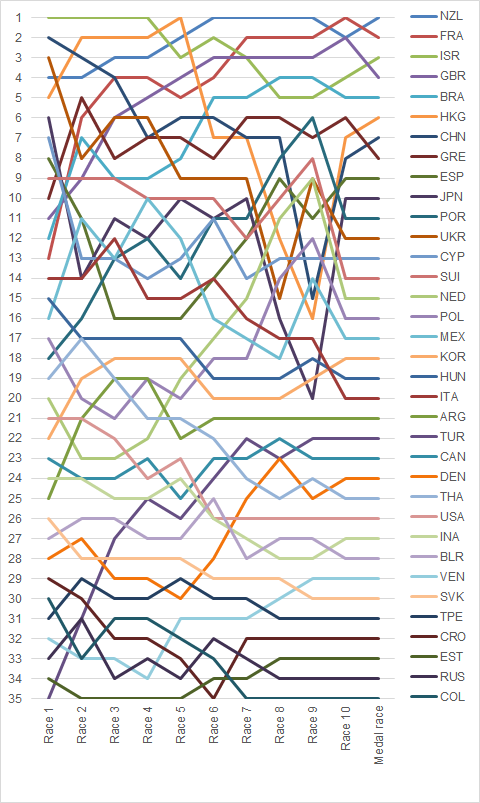
Graph showing the daily standings in the Men's RS:X during the 2008 Summer Olympics
