= Sailing at the 2015 Pan American Games – Men's RS:X =

Men's RS:X at the 2015 Pan American Games
- Venue: Royal Canadian Yacht Club
- Dates: July 12 - July 18
- Competitors: 7 from 7 nations

Medalists
Gold medal	Ricardo Santos	Brazil
Silver medal	David Mier	Mexico
Bronze medal	Mariano Reutemann	Argentina

The men's RS:X competition of the sailing events at the 2015 Pan American Games in Toronto was held from July 12 to July 18 at the Royal Canadian Yacht Club.

Points were assigned based on the finishing position in each race (1 for first, 2 for second, etc.). The points were totaled from the top 12 results of the first 13 races, with lower totals being better. If a sailor was disqualified or did not complete the race, 8 points were assigned for that race (as there were 7 sailors in this competition). The top 5 sailors at that point competed in the final race, with placings counting double for final score. The sailor with the lowest total score won.

== Schedule ==
All times are Eastern Daylight Time (UTC-4).

Date	Time	Round
July 12, 2015	11:35	Race 1
July 13, 2015	11:35	Races 2, 3 and 4
July 15, 2015	10:35	Races 5, 6 and 7
July 16, 2015	11:35	Races 8, 9 and 10
July 17, 2015	11:35	Races 11, 12 and 13
July 18, 2015	15:05	Medal race

== Results ==
Race M is the medal race.

Rank	Athlete	Nation	Race														Total Points	Net Points
Rank	Athlete	Nation	1	2	3	4	5	6	7	8	9	10	11	12	13	M	Total Points	Net Points
1st place, gold medalist(s)	Ricardo Santos	Brazil	1	2	1	1	3	1	2	1	1	2	2	2	(5)	6	30	25
2nd place, silver medalist(s)	David Mier	Mexico	(6)	3	2	3	1	2	1	2	2	4	1	3	4	4	38	32
3rd place, bronze medalist(s)	Mariano Reutemann	Argentina	(4)	1	3	4	4	3	3	3	3	1	3	1	2	2	37	33
4	Daniel Flores	Venezuela	3	4	(7)	6	2	4	4	4	4	6	5	4	3	10	66	59
5	Zachary Plavsic	Canada	2	(8); OCS	5	2	7	5	5	5	6	5	4	5	1	8	68	60
6	Carson Crain	United States	5	5	4	5	5	(7)	7	6	7	7	7	6	6		77	70
7	Santiago Grillo	Colombia	(7)	6	6	7	6	6	6	7	5	3	6	7	7		79	72
