= Sailing at the 2011 Pan American Games – Men's RS:X =

Men's sailboard at the 2011 Pan American Games
- Venue: Vallarta Yacht Club
- Dates: October 17 - October 23
- Competitors: 10 from 10 nations

Medalists
Gold medal	Ricardo Santos	Brazil
Silver medal	Mariano Reutemann	Argentina
Bronze medal	David Mier	Mexico

The men's sailboard sailing event at the 2011 Pan American Games was held from October 17–23 at the Vallarta Yacht Club in Puerto Vallarta. The defending Pan American Games champion was Ricardo Santos of Brazil.

Points were assigned based on the finishing position in each race (1 for first, 2 for second, etc.). The points were totaled from the top 9 results of the first 10 races, with lower totals being better. If a sailor was disqualified or did not complete the race, 11 points were assigned for that race (as there were 10 sailors in this competition). The top five sailors at that point competed in the final race, with placings counting double for final score. The sailor with the lowest total score won.

== Schedule ==
All times are Central Standard Time (UTC-6).

Date	Time	Round
October 17, 2011	13:00	1 and 2 races
October 18, 2011	13:00	3 and 4 races
October 19, 2011	13:00	5 and 6 races
October 21, 2011	13:00	7 and 8 races
October 22, 2011	13:00	9 and 10 races
October 23, 2011	15:57	Medal race

== Results ==
Race M is the medal race in which only the top five competitors took part. Each boat can drop its lowest result provided that all ten races are completed. If less than ten races are completed all races will count. Boats cannot drop their result in the medal race.

Rank	Athlete	Race											Total Points	Net Points
Rank	Athlete	1	2	3	4	5	6	7	8	9	10	M	Total Points	Net Points
1st place, gold medalist(s)	Ricardo Santos (BRA)	(3)	1	1	1	2	3	1	1	2	1	2	18	15
2nd place, silver medalist(s)	Mariano Reutemann (ARG)	1	2	2	(3)	1	2	2	3	1	3	4	24	21
3rd place, bronze medalist(s)	David Mier (MEX)	2	3	(6)	2	4	1	4	2	3	2	10	39	33
4	Santiago Grillo (COL)	5	6	3	4	5	(7)	3	5	6	4	8	56	49
5	Zachary Plavsic (CAN)	(6)	4	4	6	6	5	5	4	5	6	6	57	51
6	Daniel Flores (VEN)	4	7	(8)	5	3	6	8	8	4	7	–	60	52
7	Robert Willis (USA)	(9)	5	5	7	7	8	6	6	8	9	–	70	61
8	Juan Orta (CUB)	7	9	9	8	8	4	9	7	9	(10)	–	80	70
9	Alejandro Monllor (PUR)	8	8	7	9	(11); DNF	9	7	10	10	5	–	84	74
10	Matías Canseco (PER)	(10)	10	10	10	9	10	10	9	7	8	–	93	83
