= Sailing at the 2010 Asian Games – Men's RS:X =

Men's RS:X at the 2010 Asian Games
- Venue: Shanwei Water Sports Center
- Date: 14–20 November 2010
- Competitors: 10 from 10 nations

Medalists
gold medal	Wang Aichen	China
silver medal	Ek Boonsawad	Thailand
bronze medal	Lee Tae-hoon	South Korea

The men's RS:X competition at the 2010 Asian Games in Shanwei was held from 14 to 20 November 2010.

== Schedule ==
All times are China Standard Time (UTC+08:00)

Date	Time	Event
Sunday, 14 November 2010	12:00	Race 1
Sunday, 14 November 2010	12:00	Race 2
Monday, 15 November 2010	12:00	Race 3
Monday, 15 November 2010	12:00	Race 4
Tuesday, 16 November 2010	12:00	Race 5
Tuesday, 16 November 2010	12:00	Race 6
Wednesday, 17 November 2010	12:00	Race 7
Wednesday, 17 November 2010	12:00	Race 8
Friday, 19 November 2010	12:00	Race 9
Saturday, 20 November 2010	12:00	Race 10
Saturday, 20 November 2010	12:00	Race 11
Saturday, 20 November 2010	12:00	Race 12

== Results ==
Legend

- DNF — Did not finish
- DNS — Did not start

Rank	Athlete	Race												Total
Rank	Athlete	1	2	3	4	5	6	7	8	9	10	11	12	Total
1st place, gold medalist(s)	Wang Aichen (CHN)	1	~~(5)~~	1	1	2	1	1	1	1	2	1	1	13
2nd place, silver medalist(s)	Ek Boonsawad (THA)	2	3	4	3	5	2	2	2	~~(6)~~	4	2	3	32
3rd place, bronze medalist(s)	Lee Tae-hoon (KOR)	~~(5)~~	2	2	2	3	5	4	3	4	3	3	2	33
4	Makoto Tomizawa (JPN)	3	1	3	4	1	4	5	5	2	5	5	~~(6)~~	38
5	Cheng Kwok Fai (HKG)	4	4	~~(5)~~	5	4	3	3	4	3	1	4	4	39
6	Reneric Moreno (PHI)	6	6	6	6	7	7	8	6	~~(9)~~	6	6	5	69
7	Qasim Abbas (PAK)	7	~~(11)~~; DNS	7	7	6	6	6	8	7	7	7	7	75
8	Leonard Ong (SIN)	8	7	8	8	8	~~(9)~~	7	7	5	8	8	9	83
9	Hadri Zainal Abidin (MAS)	~~(9)~~	8	9	9	9	8	9	9	8	9	9	8	95
10	Sina Arash (IRI)	~~(11)~~; DNF	11; DNS	10	11; DNF	10	10	10	10	10	10	10	11; DNF	113
