= Sailing at the 2014 Asian Games – Men's RS:X =

Men's RS:X at the 2014 Asian Games
- Venue: Wangsan Marina
- Date: 24–30 September 2014
- Competitors: 9 from 9 nations

Medalists
gold medal	Wang Aichen	China
silver medal	Andy Leung	Hong Kong
bronze medal	Ek Boonsawad	Thailand

The men's RS:X competition at the 2014 Asian Games in Incheon was held from 24 to 30 September 2014.

== Schedule ==
All times are Korea Standard Time (UTC+09:00)

Date	Time	Event
Wednesday, 24 September 2014	12:00	Race 1
Wednesday, 24 September 2014	12:00	Race 2
Wednesday, 24 September 2014	12:00	Race 3
Thursday, 25 September 2014	11:00	Race 4
Thursday, 25 September 2014	11:00	Race 5
Thursday, 25 September 2014	11:00	Race 6
Friday, 26 September 2014	11:00	Race 7
Friday, 26 September 2014	11:00	Race 8
Saturday, 27 September 2014	11:00	Race 9
Saturday, 27 September 2014	11:00	Race 10
Tuesday, 30 September 2014	11:00	Race 11
Tuesday, 30 September 2014	11:00	Race 12

== Results ==
Legend

- DSQ — Disqualification

Rank	Athlete	Race												Total
Rank	Athlete	1	2	3	4	5	6	7	8	9	10	11	12	Total
1st place, gold medalist(s)	Wang Aichen (CHN)	2	1	1	2	1	2	1	3	1	2	~~(4)~~	1	17
2nd place, silver medalist(s)	Andy Leung (HKG)	1	4	~~(10)~~; DSQ	3	3	1	6	4	3	1	1	3	30
3rd place, bronze medalist(s)	Ek Boonsawad (THA)	~~(6)~~	3	2	4	4	3	2	1	2	3	3	4	31
4	Lee Tae-hoon (KOR)	3	2	4	1	2	5	3	5	~~(6)~~	4	2	2	33
5	Makoto Tomizawa (JPN)	~~(7)~~	5	3	5	5	4	4	2	4	5	5	5	47
6	Chang Hao (TPE)	5	7	6	7	~~(8)~~	7	5	6	5	8	7	8	71
7	Harold Madrigal (PHI)	4	8	7	~~(9)~~	7	8	8	8	7	7	6	6	76
8	Leonard Ong (SIN)	~~(9)~~	9	5	6	6	6	7	7	9	9	8	7	79
9	Waleed Al-Kendi (OMA)	8	6	8	8	~~(9)~~	9	9	9	8	6	9	9	89
