= Carlos Julio Flores =

Venezuelan windsurfer (born 1980)

Personal information
- Full name: Carlos Julio Flores Pérez
- Nationality: Venezuela
- Born: 27 October 1980 (age 45) Cumaná, Sucre, Venezuela
- Height: 1.69 m (5 ft 6 1/2 in)
- Weight: 68 kg (150 lb)

Sailing career
- Sport: Sailing
- Club: Centro de Vela Ligera
- Coached by: Christian Larte
- Class: Sailboard

Carlos Julio Flores Pérez (Note: In this Spanish name, the first or paternal surname is Flores and the second or maternal family name is Pérez.) (born 27 October 1980) is a Venezuelan former windsurfer, who specializes in Mistral and Neil Pryde RS:X classes. He represented his country Venezuela in two editions of the Summer Olympic Games (2004 and 2008), finishing in the top thirty respectively in two different sailboards. A member of Centro de Vela Ligera in Anzoategui, along with his younger brother and eventual two-time Olympian Daniel, Flores trained for the country's sailing federation under the tutelage of his personal coach Christian Larte.

Flores made his Olympic debut in Athens 2004, sailing in the men's Mistral class. There, he accumulated a net grade of 232 points to obtain a lowly twenty-fifth overall position from a 34-man fleet at the end of the eleven-race series.

At the 2008 Summer Olympics in Beijing, Flores qualified for his second Venezuelan team in the inaugural RS:X class. Building up to his Olympic selection, he finished eighteenth out of 50 windsurfers in the silver fleet to grab the last of the nine quota spots available at the class-associated Worlds seven months earlier in Auckland, New Zealand. Flores stormed out from behind to cross the top-fifteen mark on the final leg of the ten-race series, but it was not enough to put him through to the final, ending his Olympic quest in twenty-ninth overall with 232 net points.
