= Sailing at the 2004 Summer Olympics – Men's Mistral One Design =

Mistral One Design at the Games of the XXVIII Olympiad
- Line drawing of the Mistral One Design
- Venue: Agios Kosmas Olympic Sailing Centre
- Dates: First race: 15 August 2004; Last race: 25 August 2004
- Competitors: 34 from 34 nations

Medalists
1st place, gold medalist(s)		Gal Fridman	Israel
2nd place, silver medalist(s)		Nikolaos Kaklamanakis	Greece
3rd place, bronze medalist(s)		Nick Dempsey	Great Britain

The Men's Mistral One Design was a sailing event on the Sailing at the 2004 Summer Olympics program in Agios Kosmas Olympic Sailing Centre. Eleven races were scheduled and completed with one discard. 34 sailors from 34 nations competed.

== Race schedule ==
●	Practice races	●	Competition day	●	Last day of racing

Date	August																	
Date	12 Thu	13 Fri	14 Sat	15 Sun	16 Mon	17 Tue	18 Wed	19 Thu	20 Fri	21 Sat	22 Sun	23 Mon	24 Tue	25 Wed	26 Thu	27 Fri	28 Sat	29 Sun
Actual	PR	PR		S1			S2,3	S4	S5 6	S7 8	Res	S9,10	Res	MR				
Scheduled	PR			S1,2	Res	S3,4	Res	S5,6	Res	S7,8	Res	S9,10	Res	MR				

== Final results ==
Rank	Country	Helmsman	Race 1		Race 2		Race 3		Race 4		Race 5		Race 6		Race 7		Race 8		Race 9		Race 10		Race 11		Total	Total – discard
Rank	Country	Helmsman	Pos.	Pts.	Pos.	Pts.	Pos.	Pts.	Pos.	Pts.	Pos.	Pts.	Pos.	Pts.	Pos.	Pts.	Pos.	Pts.	Pos.	Pts.	Pos.	Pts.	Pos.	Pts.	Total	Total – discard
1st place, gold medalist(s)	Israel	Gal Fridman	~~8~~	~~8.0~~	3	3.0	5	5.0	5	5.0	1	1.0	7	7.0	5	5.0	1	1.0	8	8.0	5	5.0	2	2.0	50.0	42.0
2nd place, silver medalist(s)	Greece	Nikolaos Kaklamanakis	1	1.0	4	4.0	4	4.0	~~14~~	~~14.0~~	6	6.0	13	13.0	2	2.0	3	3.0	5	5.0	4	4.0	10	10.0	66.0	52.0
3rd place, bronze medalist(s)	Great Britain	Nick Dempsey	2	2.0	11	11.0	~~15~~	~~15.0~~	10	10.0	2	2.0	9	9.0	1	1.0	10	10.0	1	1.0	6	6.0	1	1.0	68.0	53.0
4	Brazil	Ricardo Santos	4	4.0	6	6.0	2	2.0	1	1.0	5	5.0	~~17~~	~~17.0~~	7	7.0	2	2.0	9	9.0	1	1.0	17	17.0	71.0	54.0
5	Poland	Przemysław Miarczyński	6	6.0	1	1.0	1	1.0	15	15.0	10	10.0	6	6.0	9	9.0	16	16.0	2	2.0	7	7.0	~~20~~	~~20.0~~	93.0	73 .0
6	Portugal	João Rodrigues	10	10.0	2	2.0	22	22.0	9	9.0	3	3.0	5	5.0	4	4.0	~~OCS~~	~~35.0~~	7	7.0	8	8.0	8	8.0	113.0	78.0
7	China	Zhou Yuanguo	~~19~~	~~19.0~~	9	9.0	21	21.0	3	3.0	8	8.0	1	1.0	11	11.0	4	4.0	12	12.0	14	14.0	3	3.0	103.0	84.0
8	Australia	Lars Kleppich	9	9.0	12	12.0	10	10.0	4	4.0	13	13.0	2	2.0	8	8.0	6	6.0	6	6.0	~~31~~	~~31.0~~	14	14.0	115.0	84.0
9	France	Julien Bontemps	5	5.0	~~DSQ~~	~~35.0~~	9	9.0	8	8.0	12	12.0	11	11.0	6	6.0	14	14.0	4	4.0	2	2.0	18	18.0	124.0	89.0
10	New Zealand	Tom Ashley	17	17.0	7	7.0	3	3.0	~~18~~	~~18.0~~	14	14.0	8	8.0	14	14.0	18	18.0	3	3.0	3	3.0	11	11.0	116.0	98.0
11	Turkey	Ertuğrul İçingir	7	7.0	17	17.0	8	8.0	6	6.0	4	4.0	16	16.0	3	3.0	~~OCS~~	~~35.0~~	19	19.0	12	12.0	13	13.0	140.0	105.0
12	Spain	Iván Pastor	15	15.0	10	10.0	11	11.0	2	2.0	9	9.0	~~OCS~~	~~35.0~~	18	18.0	15	15.0	10	10.0	18	18.0	4	4.0	147.0	112.0
13	Cyprus	Andreas Cariolou	3	3.0	21	21.0	6	6.0	20	20.0	7	7.0	18	18.0	13	13.0	11	11.0	~~24~~	~~24.0~~	16	16.0	21	21.0	160.0	136.0
14	Hong Kong	Ho Chi Ho	21	21.0	22	22.0	13	13.0	~~24~~	~~24.0~~	18	18.0	3	3.0	17	17.0	7	7.0	21	21.0	9	9.0	7	7.0	162.0	138.0
15	Argentina	Mariano Reutemann	~~29~~	~~29.0~~	5	5.0	24	24.0	7	7.0	23	23.0	23	23.0	15	15.0	13	13.0	11	11.0	10	10.0	9	9.0	169.0	140.0
16	Mexico	David Mier y Terán	11	11.0	15	15.0	12	12.0	19	19.0	11	11.0	14	14.0	19	19.0	5	5.0	16	16.0	20	20.0	~~26~~	~~26.0~~	168.0	142.0
17	Ukraine	Maksym Oberemko	20	20.0	14	14.0	7	7.0	13	13.0	20	20.0	20	20.0	~~DSQ~~	~~35.0~~	9	9.0	26	26.0	11	11.0	6	6.0	171.0	146.0
18	Indonesia	I Gusti Made Oka Sulaksana	18	18.0	19	19.0	19	19.0	12	12.0	25	25.0	10	10.0	21	21.0	~~26~~	~~26.0~~	14	14.0	17	17.0	12	12.0	193.0	167.0
19	Japan	Motokazu Kenjo	16	16.0	23	23.0	18	18.0	23	23.0	~~OCS~~	~~35.0~~	4	4.0	12	12.0	12	12.0	15	15.0	19	19.0	28	28.0	X.0	170.0
20	Netherlands	Joeri van Dijk	26	26.0	18	18.0	16	16.0	17	17.0	~~28~~	~~28.0~~	15	15.0	10	10.0	17	17.0	13	13.0	26	26.0	19	19.0	205.0	177.0
21	Thailand	Arun Homraruen	14	14.0	28	28.0	20	20.0	~~DSQ~~	~~35.0~~	15	15.0	30	30.0	26	26.0	21	21.0	17	17.0	13	13.0	5	5.0	224.0	189.0
22	Hungary	Áron Gádorfalvi	12	12.0	16	16.0	17	17.0	26	26.0	24	24.0	24	24.0	22	22.0	8	8.0	18	18.0	~~27~~	~~27.0~~	25	25.0	219.0	192.0
23	Tunisia	Foued Ourabi	23	23.0	~~31~~	~~31.0~~	27	27.0	21	21.0	21	21.0	19	19.0	25	25.0	19	19.0	25	25.0	15	15.0	16	16.0	242.0	211.0
24	Switzerland	Richard Stauffacher	24	24.0	13	13.0	14	14.0	25	25.0	~~OCS~~	~~35.0~~	22	22.0	24	24.0	20	20.0	22	22.0	23	23.0	OCS	35.0	257.0	222.0
25	Venezuela	Carlos Julio Flores	25	25.0	~~30~~	~~30.0~~	26	26.0	11	11.0	16	16.0	25	25.0	28	28.0	27	27.0	27	27.0	24	24.0	23	23.0	262.0	232.0
26	Italy	Riccardo Giordano	13	13.0	8	8.0	29	29.0	22	22.0	19	19.0	21	21.0	20	20.0	~~OCS~~	~~35.0~~	32	32.0	DNF	35.0	DNS	35.0	271.0	234.0
27	South Korea	Ok Duck-pil	31	31.0	24	24.0	28	28.0	28	28.0	27	27.0	~~DNF~~	~~35.0~~	16	16.0	22	22.0	23	23.0	22	22.0	15	15.0	271.0	236.0
28	United States	Peter Wells	22	22.0	20	20.0	23	23.0	16	16.0	22	22.0	29	29.0	27	27.0	24	24.0	30	30.0	28	28.0	~~31~~	~~31.0~~	262.0	241.0
29	Russia	Vladimir Moiseyev	~~32~~	~~32.0~~	29	29.0	30	30.0	27	27.0	26	26.0	12	12.0	23	23.0	23	23.0	28	28.0	30	30.0	24	24.0	284.0	252.0
30	Germany	Toni Wilhelm	27	27.0	26	26.0	25	25.0	29	29.0	17	17.0	31	31.0	29	29.0	~~OCS~~	~~35.0~~	20	20.0	21	21.0	OCS	35.0	295.0	260.0
31	Czech Republic	Tom Malina	28	28.0	25	25.0	32	32.0	32	32.0	31	31.0	26	26.0	~~33~~	~~33.0~~	28	28.0	29	29.0	32	32.0	22	22.0	318.0	285.0
32	Uruguay	Ángel Segura	30	30.0	~~33~~	~~33.0~~	31	31.0	31	31.0	29	29.0	28	28.0	31	31.0	25	25.0	31	31.0	29	29.0	29	29.0	327.0	294.0
33	Bulgaria	Veselin Nanev	33	33.0	~~DNF~~	~~35.0~~	33	33.0	30	30.0	30	30.0	32	32.0	30	30.0	29	29.0	33	33.0	25	25.0	30	30.0	340.0	305 .0
34	Slovakia	Martin Lapoš	~~34~~	~~34.0~~	27	27.0	34	34.0	33	33.0	32	32.0	27	27.0	32	32.0	30	30.0	34	34.0	33	33.0	27	27.0	343.0	309.0

Legend: DNF – Did not finish; DNS – Did not start; DSQ – Disqualified; OCS – On the course side of the starting line;
Discard is crossed out and does not count for the overall result.

== Daily standings ==
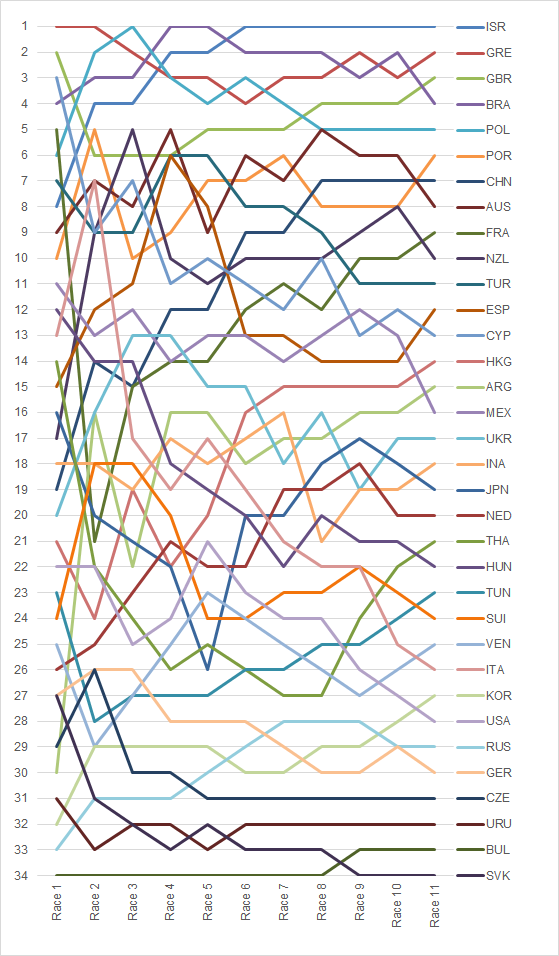
Graph showing the daily standings in the Men's Mistral One Design during the 2004 Summer Olympics
