= Alexey Tokarev =

Russian windsurfer

Personal information
- Full name: Alexey Vasilyevich Tokarev
- Nationality: Russian
- Born: 25 January 1973 (age 53) Irkutsk, Russian SFSR, Soviet Union
- Height: 1.80 m (5 ft 11 in)
- Weight: 73 kg (161 lb)

Sailing career
- Sport: Sailing
- Coached by: Oleg Khoperskiy
- Class: Sailboard

Alexey Vasilyevich Tokarev (Russian: Алексей Васильевич Токарев; born 25 January 1973) is a Russian windsurfer, who specialized in the RS:X class. He represented his country Russia at the 2008 Summer Olympics, finishing outside the top thirty from a fleet of 35 registered windsurfers. Tokarev is also a member of the Russian Sailing Federation.

Tokarev competed for the Russian sailing squad, as a 35-year-old, in the inaugural men's RS:X class at the 2008 Summer Olympics in Beijing. He topped the selection criteria against five other windsurfers for the country's RS:X berth, based on his scores attained in a series of international regattas approved by the Russian Sailing Federation, including the class-associated Worlds seven months earlier in Auckland, New Zealand. Sitting most of the races at the sterns of a large fleet, Tokarev accumulated a net score of 279 points to finish his run in the penultimate position out of 35 entrants. Furthermore, Tokarev's overall score spared him from the bottom of the leaderboard by a desirable 14-point edge over Colombia's Santiago Grillo.
