= Tom Malina =

Czech windsurfer

Personal information
- Nationality: Czech
- Born: 14 September 1978 (age 46); Most, Czechoslovakia

Sport
- Sport: Windsurfing

Tom Malina (born 14 September 1978) is a Czech windsurfer. He competed in the men's Mistral One Design event at the 2004 Summer Olympics.
