= Foued Ourabi =

Tunisian windsurfer

Foued Ourabi (born 30 May 1975) is a Tunisian windsurfer. He competed at the 2004 Summer Olympics in the Men's Mistral sailboarding event.
