= Martin Lapoš =

Slovak windsurfer

Personal information
- Nationality: Slovak
- Born: 16 January 1980 (age 45); Žilina, Czechoslovakia

Sport
- Sport: Windsurfing

Martin Lapoš (born 16 January 1980) is a Slovak windsurfer. He competed in the men's Mistral One Design event at the 2004 Summer Olympics.
