= 2021 RS:X European Championships =

2021 European Championships
- Location: Vilamoura, Portugal
- Dates: 7 to 13 March 2021

The 2021 RS:X European Championships were held from 7 to 13 March 2021 in Vilamoura, Portugal.

== Medal summary ==
Event	Gold	Silver	Bronze
Men	Kiran Badloe; Netherlands	Mattia Camboni; Italy	Ofek Elimelech; Israel
Women	Charline Picon; France	Lilian de Geus; Netherlands	Zofia Noceti-Klepacka; Poland
