= Mikalai Zhukavets =

Belarusian windsurfer

Personal information
- Full name: Mikalai Yuryievich Zhukavets
- Nationality: Belarus
- Born: 13 August 1986 (age 39) Minsk, Belarusian SSR
- Height: 1.80 m (5 ft 11 in)
- Weight: 73 kg (161 lb)

Sailing career
- Sport: Sailing
- Club: Moshvsm
- Coached by: Uladzimir Khaladzinski
- Class: Sailboard

Mikalai Yuryievich Zhukavets (Belarusian: Мікалай Юр'евіч Жукавец; born 13 August 1986 in Minsk) is a Belarusian windsurfer, who specialized in Neil Pryde RS:X class. A two-time Olympian (2008 and 2012), he is ranked no. 34 in the world for the sailboard class by the International Sailing Federation. Zhukavets also trains for Moshvsm Sailing Club in Minsk under his personal coach and mentor Uladzimir Khaladzinski.

Zhukavets made his debut at the 2008 Summer Olympics in Beijing, where he placed twenty-eighth out of thirty-five sailors in the men's RS:X class with a net score of 229.

At the 2012 Summer Olympics in London, Zhukavets qualified for his second Belarusian team, as a 26-year-old, in the RS:X class by receiving an automatic berth from the World Championships in Cadiz, Spain. Struggling to attain a top position in the opening series including his incomplete race on the eighth leg, Zhukavets accumulated a net score of 208 points to deliver a 27th-place finish overall in a fleet of thirty-eight windsurfers.
