= Yoav Omer =

Israeli windsurfer (born 1998)

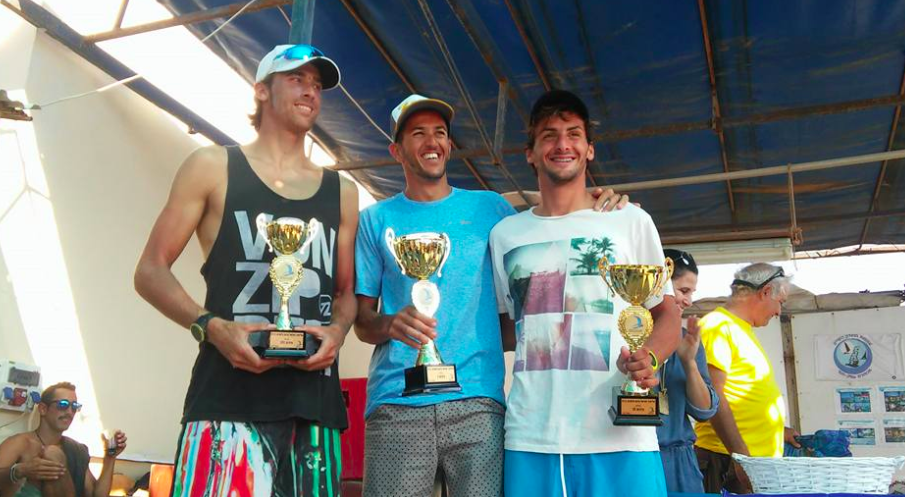

Personal information
- Native name: יואב עומר
- Nationality: Israeli
- Born: 28 October 1998 (age 28)

Sport
- Sport: RS:X
- Club: Sdot Yam Sailing Club

Achievements and titles
- Regional finals: (silver) (2018)
Medal record
Representing Israel
European Championships
Silver medal – second place	2018 Sopot	RS:X
- Updated on 22 November 2026

Yoav Omer (Hebrew: יואב עומר; born 28 October 1998) is an Israeli windsurfer. He won a silver medal at the 2018 RS:X European Championships in Sopot. Omer is the 2015 and 2016 junior world champion. He also competed for Israel at the 2014 Summer Youth Olympics.

== See also ==
- List of European Championships medalists in sailing
