= Dmitry Polishchuk =

Russian windsurfer

Dmitry Igorevich Polishchuk (Russian: Дмитрий Игоревич Полищук, born 8 February 1987 in Sochi) is a Russian windsurfer. He competed at the 2012 Summer Olympics in the RS:X class.

== Results ==
Year	Competition	Venue	Position	Event
2012	Olympic Games	(United Kingdom) London	20th	2012 Olympics - RS:X
