= Richard Stauffacher =

Swiss windsurfer

Richard Stauffacher (born 28 August 1982) is a Swiss windsurfer. He has competed at the Olympics since 2004 in the RS:X.

== Results ==
| Year | Competition | Venue | Position | Event |
|---|---|---|---|---|
| 2004 | Olympic Games | (Greece) Athens | 24th | 2008 Olympics - RS:X |
| 2008 | Olympic Games | (China) Beijing | 14th | 2008 Olympics - RS:X |
| 2012 | Olympic Games | (United Kingdom) London | 10th | 2012 Olympics - RS:X |
