= Andy Leung =

Hong Kong windsurfer (born 1990)

Personal information
- Born: 20 October 1990 (age 35) Hong Kong

Sailing career
- Sport: Sailing
Medal record
Men's sailing
Representing Hong Kong
Asian Games
| Silver medal – second place | 2014 Incheon | RS:X |

Ho Tsun "Andy" Leung (born 20 October 1990) is a Hong Kong windsurfer. He competed at the 2012 Olympics in the RS:X.

== Results ==
| Year | Competition | Venue | Position | Event |
|---|---|---|---|---|
| 2012 | Olympic Games | (United Kingdom) London | 13th | 2012 Olympics - RS:X |
