= Mattia Camboni =

Italian windsurfer

Personal information
- Nationality: Italian
- Born: 26 April 1996 (age 30) Civitavecchia, Italy
- Height: 180 cm (5 ft 11 in)
- Weight: 70 kg (154 lb)

Sailing career
- Sport: Sailing
- Club: Fiamme Azzurre
- Class(es): RS:X, IQFOiL, Techno 293
Medal record
Men's sailing
Representing Italy
World Championships
Silver medal – second place	2021 Cádiz	RS:X
European Championships
Gold medal – first place	2018 Sopot	RS:X
Silver medal – second place	2021 Vilamoura	RS:X
Bronze medal – third place	2017 Marseille	RS:X
Mediterranean Games
Gold medal – first place	2018 Tarragona	RS:X

Mattia Camboni (born 26 April 1996) is an Italian competitive sailor.

He competed at the 2016 Summer Olympics in Rio de Janeiro, in the men's RS:X. and 2020 Summer Olympics, in RS:X.
