= Benjamin Barger =

American windsurfer

Ben Barger
Personal information
- Full name: Benjamin Oden Barger
- Nationality: United States
- Born: December 24, 1980 (age 45) Greenville, Texas, U.S.
- Height: 1.83 m (6 ft 0 in)
- Weight: 73 kg (161 lb)

Sailing career
- Sport: Sailing
- Club: St. Petersburg Yacht Club
- Coached by: Mike Gebhardt (USA); Aaron McIntosh (NZL)
- Class: Sailboard

Benjamin Oden Barger (born December 24, 1980) is an American former windsurfer, who specialized in the RS:X class. He was a seven-time national champion in his sporting discipline, an unofficial alternate for two Olympic teams (2004 and 2012), and the country's top male windsurfer for the 2008 Summer Olympics, finishing a lowly twenty-sixth place. Outside competitive sailing, Barger served for four years as both the board trustee and chairman of the ISAF Athletes' Commission (2009 to 2013). A member of St. Petersburg Yacht Club and a current resident of Tampa, Florida, Barger trained most of his sporting career under the mentorship of two-time medalist Mike Gebhardt; however, the pair announced their split professionally, when Gebhardt came out of retirement for another shot at Olympic glory in 2007.

Barger competed for the U.S. sailing squad in the inaugural men's RS:X class at the 2008 Summer Olympics in Beijing. Building up to his Olympic selection, he beat his former coach Gebhardt by eight points to lock the country's top RS:X spot at the U.S. Team Trials a year earlier in Long Beach, California. Barger clearly struggled to catch a large fleet of windsurfers from behind under breezy conditions with marks lower than fifteenth place at the end of ten-race series, sitting him steadily in twenty-sixth overall with a net grade of 217.
