= Patrik Pollák =

Slovak windsurfer (born 1972)

Personal information
- Nickname: Flyin' Slovak
- Nationality: Slovakia
- Born: 6 September 1972 (age 53) Košice, Czechoslovakia
- Height: 1.70 m (5 ft 7 in)
- Weight: 67 kg (148 lb)

Sailing career
- Sport: Sailing
- Club: Akademia TU Košice
- Coached by: Jozef Pollák
- Class: Sailboard

Patrik Pollák (born 6 September 1972) is a Slovak windsurfer, who specializes in Mistral and RS:X classes. He became the first and only Slovak sailor to compete in three editions of the Summer Olympic Games (1996, 2000, and 2008), finishing outside the top twenty-five respectively in two different sailboards. As a member of the sailing roster for Akademia TU Košice, Pollák trained most of his sporting career under the tutelage of his personal coach and father Jozef.

Pollák made his Olympic debut in Atlanta 1996, finishing twenty-seventh in the inaugural men's Mistral sailboard with a net grade of 155. At the 2000 Summer Olympics in Sydney, Pollák started the series comfortably in the eleventh spot. He faded slightly towards the middle of the fleet for the remainder and never looked back, sitting him in lowly twenty-sixth overall with 188 net points.

Pollák sought to bid for his third consecutive trip to the Games in Athens 2004, but he lost to the 20-year-old newcomer Martin Lapoš based on the federation's domestic selection criteria.

Eight years after his maiden Games, Pollák qualified for his third Slovak team on a successful attempt in the RS:X class for the 2008 Summer Olympics in Beijing. He finished third out of 50 windsurfers in the silver fleet to secure one of the nine quota spots available at the class-associated Worlds seven months earlier in Auckland, New Zealand. Struggling to catch a large fleet of windsurfers to the front, Pollák scored a net grade of 243 to steer and maintain his pace for a thirtieth overall placement at the end of the ten-leg series.
