= Veselin Nanev =

Bulgarian windsurfer

Personal information
- Nationality: Bulgarian
- Born: 21 January 1987 (age 38); Pomorie, Bulgaria

Sport
- Sport: Windsurfing

Veselin Nanev (Bulgarian: Веселин Нанев; born 21 January 1987) is a Bulgarian windsurfer. He competed in the men's Mistral One Design event at the 2004 Summer Olympics.
