= Yoan Kolev =

Bulgarian windsurfer (born 1991)

Personal information
- Nationality: Bulgaria
- Born: 23 July 1991 (age 34) Varna, Bulgaria
- Height: 1.83 m (6 ft 0 in)
- Weight: 76 kg (168 lb)

Sailing career
- Sport: Sailing
- Club: YSC Nesebar
- Coached by: Yavor Kolev
- Class: Sailboard

Yoan Kolev (Bulgarian: Йоан Колев; born 23 July 1991 in Varna) is a Bulgarian windsurfer, who specialized in Neil Pryde RS:X class. As of September 2013, he is ranked no. 101 in the world for the sailboard class by the International Sailing Federation. Kolev also trains for Yavor Sailing Club in Nesebar under his personal coach, mentor, and brother Yavor Kolev.

Kolev competed in the men's RS:X class at the 2012 Summer Olympics in London. He qualified by finishing in fifty-ninth-place at the World Championships in Cadiz, Spain, earning an automatic entry to the Olympics. Entering the opening series with a lackluster performance, Kolev managed to pull off a single top ten finish in the final race, but fell short for a chance to compete in the medal round with a twenty-sixth-place effort and a net score of 207 points.
