= Federico Esposito =

Italian windsurfer

Personal information
- Nationality: Italy
- Born: 2 July 1986 (age 40) Piombino, Italy
- Height: 1.66 m (5 ft 5 in)
- Weight: 69 kg (152 lb)

Sailing career
- Sport: Sailing
- Club: Fiamme Oro
- Coached by: Adriano Stella
- Class: Sailboard

Federico Esposito (born 2 July 1986) is an Italian windsurfer, who specialized in Neil Pryde RS:X class. He was born in Piombino. He represented Italy at the 2012 Summer Olympics, and has been currently training for Fiamma Oro Sport Club (Italian: Gruppo Sportivo Fiamme Oro) under his personal coach and mentor Adriano Stella. As of September 2013, Esposito is ranked no. 45 in the world for the sailboard class by the International Sailing Federation.

== Biography ==
Esposito competed in the men's RS:X class at the 2012 Summer Olympics in London by finishing thirty-sixth and receiving a berth from the ISAF World Championships in Perth, Western Australia. Struggling to attain a top position in the opening series, Esposito accumulated a net score of 269 points to pick up a thirty-fourth spot in a fleet of thirty-eight windsurfers.
