= Chang Hao (windsurfer) =

Taiwanese windsurfer

Personal information
- Nationality: Chinese Taipei
- Born: 14 November 1990 (age 35) Nantou, Taiwan
- Height: 1.73 m (5 ft 8 in)
- Weight: 67 kg (148 lb)

Sailing career
- Sport: Sailing
- Club: Chinese Taipei Sailing; Association
- Class: Sailboard

Chang Hao (Chinese: 張浩; pinyin: Zhāng Hào; born November 14, 1990, in Nantou) is a Taiwanese windsurfer, who specialized in Neil Pryde RS:X class. He represented Chinese Taipei in three editions of the Olympic Games (2008, 2012 and 2016) and has been trained by coach Lin Chun Chien for most of his career. As of September 2013, Chang is ranked no. 103 in the world for the sailboard class by the International Sailing Federation.

Chang made his official debut, as a 17-year-old teen, at the 2008 Summer Olympics in Beijing, where he finished thirty-first in the men's RS:X class with a net score of 260, edging out Croatia's Luka Mratović by a scant, five-point gap.

At the 2012 Summer Olympics in London, Chang competed for his second Chinese Taipei team in the RS:X class, having receiving a berth through his results at the World Championships in Cadiz, Spain. Struggling to attain a higher position in the opening series, Chang posted a net score of 289 points to end his race with a thirty-fifth-place effort in a fleet of thirty-eight windsurfers.

At the 2016 Summer Olympics, he finished in 32nd.
