= Sebastian Wang-Hansen =

Norwegian windsurfer

Personal information
- Nationality: Norwegian
- Born: 6 June 1988 (age 36); Tønsberg, Norway

Sport
- Sport: Sailing

Sebastian Wang-Hansen (born 6 June 1988) is a Norwegian sailor. He was born in Tønsberg, and represents the Royal Norwegian Yacht Club. He competed in sailboard at the 2012 Summer Olympics in London.
