= Robert Willis (sailor) =

American windsurfer

Robert Willis (born March 15, 1987, in Chicago) is an American windsurfer. He competed at the 2012 Olympics in the RS:X.

== Results ==
Year	Competition	Venue	Position	Event
2012	Olympic Games	(United Kingdom) London	22nd	2012 Olympics - RS:X
