= Juozas Bernotas =

Lithuanian windsurfer (born 1989)

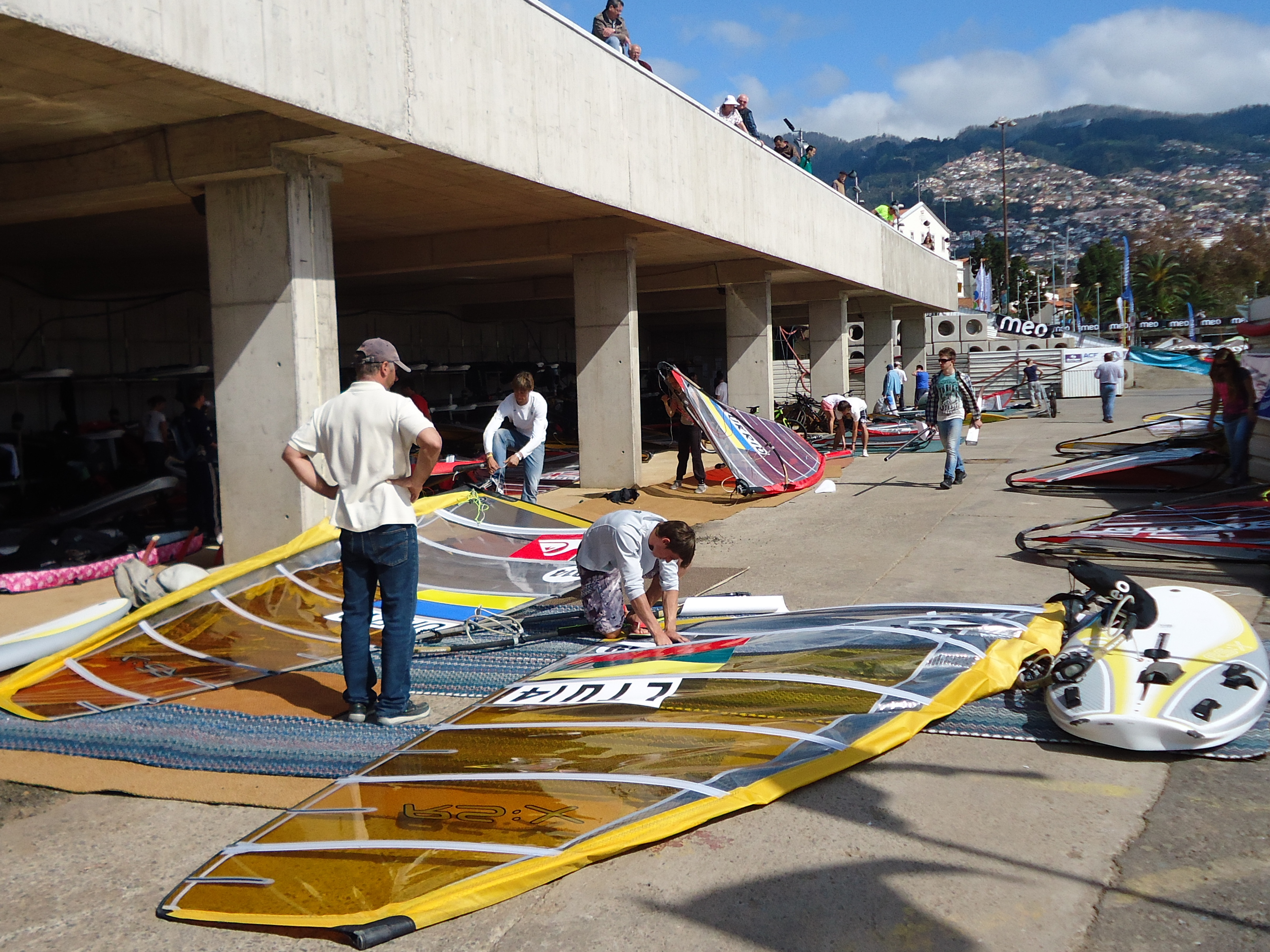
- Juozas Bernotas at European Championships 2012 in Madeira.

Personal information
- Born: 23 April 1989 (age 37) Kaunas, Lithuanian SSR, Soviet Union
Medal record
Men's windsurfing
Representing Lithuania
World Championships
Gold medal – first place	2021 Riga	Raceboard

Juozas Bernotas (born 23 April 1989 in Kaunas) is windsurfer from Lithuania. He started his career in 1999. His first coach was R.Vilkas, the second coach was G.Bernotas.

== Biography ==
Finished bachelor's and master's degrees in Lithuanian Sports University Lithuanian Academy of Physical Education. Married Gilija Bernotiene.

== Achievements ==
- 2007 World junior championship – 11th
- 2008 Kiel Week Germany - 33rd
- 2009 World championship Great Britain – 56th
- 2010 World Cup championship France - 55th
- 2010 World Cup championship Holland - 56th
- 2011 World championship – 37th
- 2011 Kiel Regatta (Kieler Woche) - 8th
- 2011 World Cup championship Holland - 7th
- 2012 World championship Spain – 34th
- 2012 European championship Spain - 34th
- 2012 European championship Portugal – 32nd
- 2012 World Cup championship France - 17th
- Sailing at the 2012 Summer Olympics – Men's RS:X - 12th
- Sailing at the 2016 Summer Olympics – Men's RS:X - 26th
- Sailing at the 2020 Summer Olympics – Men's RS:X - 15th
