= Ricardo Santos (sailor) =

Brazilian windsurfer

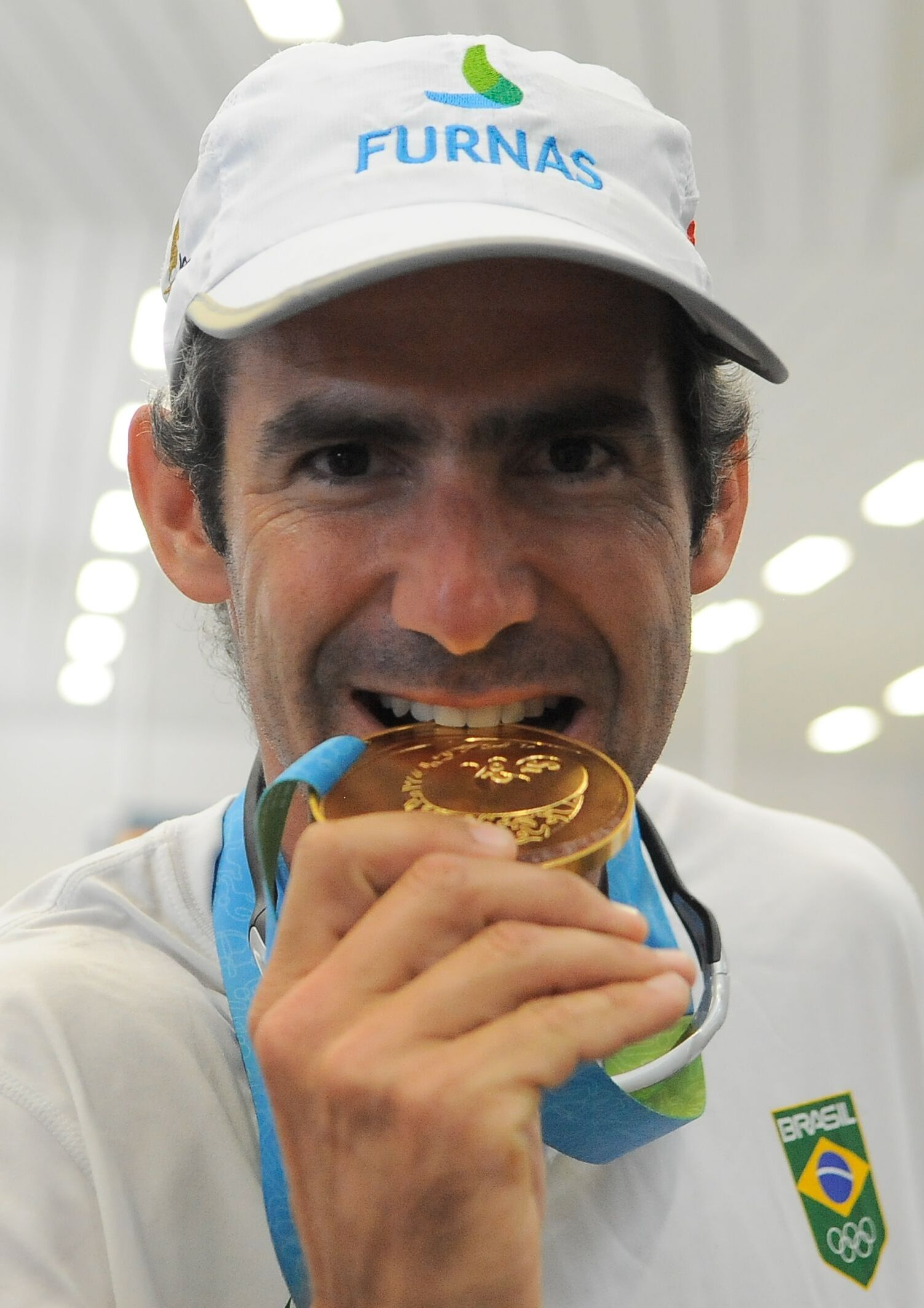
- Ricardo Winicki, in 2015

Personal information
- Full name: Ricardo Winicki Santos
- Nickname: Bimba
- Nationality: Brazil
- Born: 8 May 1980 (age 46) Rio de Janeiro, Brazil
- Height: 1.85 m (6 ft 1 in)
- Weight: 71 kg (157 lb)

Sailing career
- Sport: Sailing
- Class(es): Mistral, RS:X, Finn, Raceboard
Medal record
Sailing
Representing Brazil
World Championships
Gold medal – first place	2007 Cascais	Men's RS:X
Pan American Games
Gold medal – first place	2003 Santo Domingo	Men's Mistral
Gold medal – first place	2007 Rio	Men's RS:X
Gold medal – first place	2011 Guadalajara	Men's RS:X
Gold medal – first place	2015 Toronto	Men's RS:X
Silver medal – second place	1999 Winnipeg	Men's Mistral

Ricardo Winicki Santos (born 8 May 1980 in Rio de Janeiro) is a Brazilian windsurfer. He has competed at the Olympics between 2000 and 2016, firstly in the Mistral, and later the RS:X.

== Results ==
Year	Competition	Venue	Position	Event
2000	Olympic Games	(Australia) Sydney	15th	2000 Olympics – Mistral One Design
2004	Olympic Games	(Greece) Athens	4th	2004 Olympics – Mistral One Design
2008	Olympic Games	(China) Beijing	5th	2008 Olympics – RS:X
2012	Olympic Games	(United Kingdom) London	9th	2012 Olympics – RS:X
2016	Olympic Games	(Brazil) Rio de Janeiro	7th	2016 Olympics – RS:X
