= Sailing Federation of Hong Kong, China =

Sailing Federation of Hong Kong, China HKSF
- IOC nation: Hong Kong (HKG)
- Sport: Sailing
- Official website: www.sailing.org.hk

HISTORY
- Year of formation: 1962
- Former names: Hong Kong Sailing Federation

DEMOGRAPHICS
- Number of Sailing clubs: 7

AFFILIATIONS
- International federation: International Sailing Federation (ISAF)
- ISAF member since: 1962
- Continental association: Asian Sailing Federation (ASAF)
- National Olympic Committee: Hong Kong Olympic Committee

ELECTED
- President: Tong Shing

SECRETARIAT
- Address: Room 1009, Olympic House; 1 Stadium Path; So Kon Po; Causeway Bay
- Country: Hong Kong
- Secretary General: Eileen Sze

FINANCE
- Company status: Ltd Company

The Sailing Federation of Hong Kong, China is the national governing body for the sport of sailing in Hong Kong, recognised by the International Sailing Federation.

== History ==
Founded as the Hong Kong Yacht Racing Federation in 1962, the HKSF was incorporated as a Company Limited by Guarantee in 1970 under the name Hong Kong Yachting Association. It changed its name to Hong Kong Sailing Federation in 2004 following the change of name of the International Sailing Federation. In 2023 the name changed once again to the Sailing Federation of Hong Kong, China, although the abbreviation HKSF was kept. The HKSF membership consists of individuals, associations and clubs.

The HKSF is affiliated to:

- International Sailing Federation (ISAF)
- Asian Sailing Federation (ASAF)
- Sports Federation & Olympic Committee of Hong Kong, China (SF&OC)

It also represents interests of the recreational boating and yachting circles of Hong Kong on the Marine Department Committee as well as the interests of Hong Kong sailors to the Hong Kong SAR Government, Leisure and Cultural Services Department etc.

== Notable sailors ==
See Category:Hong Kong sailors

=== Olympic sailing ===
See Category:Olympic sailors of Hong Kong

=== Offshore sailing ===
See Category:Hong Kong sailors (sport)

== Yacht clubs ==
See Category:Yacht clubs in Hong Kong
