= Maksim Oberemko =

Ukrainian windsurfer

Personal information
- Native name: Максим Владимирович Оберемко
- Full name: Maksim Vladimirovich Oberemko
- Nationality: Ukrainian (until 2014); Russian (since 2015)
- Born: 25 January 1978 (age 48) Mykolaiv, Ukrainian SSR
- Height: 186 cm (6 ft 1 in)
- Weight: 73 kg (161 lb)

Sailing career
- Sport: Sailing
- Club: Dynamo Yevpatoriya
- Classes: Mistral One Design; RS:X
Medal record
Representing Ukraine
Summer Universiade
Silver medal – second place	1999 Palma de Mallorca	Mistral

Maksim Vladimirovich Oberemko (Russian: Максим Владимирович Оберемко; born 25 January 1978) is a Ukrainian (until 2014) and Russian (since 2015) windsurfer. He has competed for Ukraine at the Olympics, since 1996, firstly in the Mistral One Design class, and later in the RS:X class.

== Results ==
Year	Competition	Venue	Position	Event	Country Represented
1996	Olympic Games	(United States) Atlanta	25th	1996 Olympics - Mistral	Ukraine
2000	Olympic Games	(Australia) Sydney	14th	2000 Olympics - Mistral	Ukraine
2004	Olympic Games	(Greece) Athens	17th	2004 Olympics - RS:X	Ukraine
2008	Olympic Games	(China) Beijing	12th	2008 Olympics - RS:X	Ukraine
2012	Olympic Games	(United Kingdom) Weymouth	23rd	2012 Olympics - RS:X	Ukraine
2016	Olympic Games	(Brazil) Rio	16th	2016 Olympics - RS:X	Russia
