= JP Tobin =

New Zealand windsurfer

Personal information
- Full name: Jon-Paul Tobin
- Born: 22 March 1977 (age 48); Whakatāne, New Zealand
- Height: 183 cm (6 ft 0 in)
- Weight: 84 kg (185 lb)

Sailing career
- Class(es): Mistral, RS:X, Raceboard

Jon-Paul Tobin (born 22 March 1977) is a New Zealand competitive windsurfer. He was born in Whakatāne. He placed 7th in windsurfing at the 2012 Summer Olympics in London.

Tobin has twice previously been ranked No.1 in the world.

== Achievements ==
Year	Position	Boat type	Event
2013		RS:X – Men's Windsurfer	(New Zealand) Sail Auckland International Regatta
2012	7	RS:X – Men's Windsurfer	(United Kingdom) 2012 Olympic Games
2012		RS:X – Men's Windsurfer	(Spain) 2012 RS:X World Championships
2012	5	RS:X – Men's Windsurfer	(Australia) 2011 RS:X World Championships
2011		RS:X – Men's Windsurfer	New Zealand RS:X National Championship
