= Mariano Reutemann =

Argentine windsurfer

Personal information
- Nationality: Argentine
- Born: 16 March 1977 (age 49)

Sailing career
- Sport: Sailing
- Class: RS:X
Medal record
Sailing
Representing Argentina
Pan American Games
Silver medal – second place	2007 Rio	Men's RS:X
Silver medal – second place	2011 Guadalajara	Men's RS:X
Bronze medal – third place	2015 Toronto	Men's RS:X

Mariano Reutemann (born 16 March 1977) is an Argentine windsurfer. He has competed at the Olympics since 2004 in the RS:X. Mariano won the bronze medal at the 2015 Pan American Games and the silver medal at the 2011 Pan American Games and 2007.

== Results ==
Year	Competition	Venue	Position	Event
2004	Olympic Games	(Greece) Athens	15th	2004 Olympics – RS:X
2008	Olympic Games	(China) Beijing	21st	2008 Olympics – RS:X
2012	Olympic Games	(United Kingdom) London	11th	2012 Olympics – RS:X
