= Karel Lavický =

Czech windsurfer

Personal information
- Nationality: Czech Republic
- Born: 8 November 1985 (age 39); České Budějovice, Czechoslovakia
- Height: 1.92 m (6 ft 4 in)
- Weight: 80 kg (176 lb)

Sailing career
- Class: Sailboard
- Club: Yacht Club DIM Bezdrev

Karel Lavický (born 8 November 1985, in České Budějovice) is a Czech windsurfer, who specializes in Neil Pryde RS:X class. As of September 2013, he is ranked no. 62 in the world for the sailboard class by the International Sailing Federation.

Lavicky competed in the men's RS:X class at the 2012 Summer Olympics in London qualifying through the World Championships in Cadiz, Spain. Struggling to attain a top position in the opening series including his black flag violation on the fourth leg, Lavicky accumulated a net score of 296 points for a thirty-sixth-place finish in a fleet of thirty-eight windsurfers.
