= Áron Gádorfalvi =

Hungarian windsurfer (born 1976)

Personal information
- Nationality: Hungary
- Born: 5 December 1976 (age 49) Budapest, Hungary
- Height: 1.84 m (6 ft 0 in)
- Weight: 73 kg (161 lb)

Sailing career
- Sport: Sailing
- Club: Balatonfuredi Yacht Club
- Coached by: Lorand Utassy; Lázsló Ficsór
- Class: Sailboard

Áron Gádorfalvi (born 5 December 1976 in Budapest) is a Hungarian windsurfer, who specializes in Mistral and Neil Pryde RS:X classes. He represented Hungary in all five editions of the Olympic Games since 1996, and has been training at Axon SE, Gradus SK, and Balatonfuredi Yacht Club in Balatonfured for most of his sporting career under personal coaches Lorand Utassy and László Ficsór. As of September 2013, Gádorfalvi is ranked no. 48 in the world for the sailboard class by the International Sailing Federation.

As an 18-year-old, Gádorfalvi made his official debut at the 1996 Summer Olympics in Atlanta, where he placed thirty-ninth in men's Mistral sailboard with a net score of 313 points. At the 2000 Summer Olympics in Sydney, Gádorfalvi produced a stellar performance with a sterling grade of 177 to pick up a twenty-fourth spot in the same program.

At the 2004 Summer Olympics in Athens, Gadorfalvi finished twenty-second in men's Mistral with a net score of 192, trailing Thailand's Arun Homraruen by a scant, three-point gap. At the 2008 Summer Olympics in Beijing, Gadorfalvi delivered his best Olympic career result with a nineteenth-place effort and an overwhelming grade of 135 in the newly introduced RS:X class.

Sixteen years after competing in his first Olympics, Gádorfalvi qualified for his fifth Hungarian team, as a 34-year-old, in the RS:X class at the 2012 Summer Olympics in London by finishing twenty-eighth and receiving a berth from the ISAF Sailing World Championships in Perth, Western Australia. Struggling to attain a higher position in the early stages, Gádorfalvi managed to claim two top ten positions throughout the opening rounds, but missed a chance to sail for the medal race with a twenty-fifth-place finish and a net score of 187 points.
