= Johannes Ahun =

Estonian windsurfer and musician

Personal information
- Nickname: Juss
- Nationality: Estonia
- Born: 22 December 1987 (age 38) Tallinn, then part of Estonian SSR, Soviet Union
- Height: 1.88 m (6 ft 2 in)
- Weight: 80 kg (176 lb)

Sailing career
- Sport: Sailing
- Club: Noblessner Yacht Club
- Coached by: Jaak Lukk
- Class: Sailboard

Johannes Ahun (born 22 December 1987) is an Estonian former windsurfer, who specialized in Neil Pryde RS:X discipline. He is also a two-time Olympic sailor, and is currently ranked no. 45 in the world for his class by the International Sailing Federation. He quit professional sports career in 2015 and went to study sound engineering at University of Tartu Viljandi Culture Academy. From 2017 he's been a musician in Estonian folktronica band OOPUS.

Ahun was born in Tallinn, and began surfing at the age of eleven, when he was encouraged by his father to visit the beach, especially during the winter season. In 2003, he moved to Pirita, where he studied and trained under coach Karmo Kalk, at Hawaii Express Windsurfing School. Two years later, Ahun was admitted to the national senior sailing team, and had been participating in numerous windsurfing competitions, including his official international debut at the 2006 RS:X World Championships in Nago–Torbole, Italy.

Ahun competed for the first time at the 2008 Summer Olympics in Beijing, where he sailed in the men's RS:X windsurfing, finishing in thirty-third place after ten races, with a total of 273 net points. After the Olympics, he gained international success in windsurfing competitions, achieving six top-fifty placements, and narrowly missing out of the medal podium at the 2009 Warnemünde Week in Warnemünde, Germany. In 2012, Ahun eventually qualified for his second Olympics in London, after placing sixty-second at the 2012 RS:X World Championships in Cádiz, Spain, and receiving an allocated place from the ISAF. He competed in the men's RS:X windsurfing, and improved his sailing performance in all the races. However, he finished only in thirtieth place, with a score of 270 net points, after receiving a discretionary penalty in the fourth race, and for not successfully completing the penultimate race.
