= Julien Bontemps =

French windsurfer

Personal information
- Full name: Julien Francis Bontemps
- Nationality: French
- Born: 1 June 1979 (age 47) Épinal, Vosges, France
- Height: 183 cm (6 ft 0 in)
- Weight: 72 kg (159 lb)

Sailing career
- Sport: Sailing
- Club: ASPTT Nantes
- Class(es): RS:X, Mistral, Techno 293
Medal record
Men's sailing
Representing France
Olympic Games
Silver medal – second place	2008 Beijing	Sailboard
World Championships
Gold medal – first place	2004 İzmir	Mistral
Gold medal – first place	2012 Cádiz	RS:X
Gold medal – first place	2014 Santander	RS:X
Bronze medal – third place	2002 Pattaya	Mistral
Mediterranean Games
Bronze medal – third place	2005 Almería	Sailboard

Julien Francis Bontemps (born 1 June 1979 in Épinal, Vosges) is a male windsurfer from France, who won the silver medal at the 2008 Summer Olympics. He is married to Irina Konstantinova, an Olympic windsurfer.
