= Ek Boonsawad =

Thai windsurfer (born 1988)

Personal information
- Born: 30 October 1988 (age 37) Chonburi, Thailand
- Height: 183 cm (6 ft 0 in)
- Weight: 70 kg (154 lb)

Sailing career
- Sport: Sailing
- Class(es): RS:X, Mistral, IQFOiL
Medal record
Men's sailing
Representing Thailand
Asian Games
Silver medal – second place	2010 Guangzhou	RS:X
Bronze medal – third place	2014 Incheon	RS:X
Southeast Asian Games
Gold medal – first place	2007 Nakhon Ratchasima	Formula Windsurfing
Gold medal – first place	2011 Jakarta-Palembang	RS:X
Gold medal – first place	2023 Cambodia	Windfoil IQ: Foil

Ek Boonsawad (Thai: เอก บุญสวัสดิ์; born 30 October 1988 in Chonburi) is a Thai windsurfer. He competed at the 2008 and 2012 Summer Olympics in the men's RS:X category.
