= Toni Wilhelm =

German windsurfer

Toni Wilhelm OLY (born 5 February 1983) is a German competitive windsurfer. He was born in Lörrach. He competed in windsurfing at the 2004 Summer Olympics in Athens and at the 2012 Summer Olympics in London, where he finished in 4th place. At the 2016 Summer Olympics in Rio de Janeiro, he finished in 6th place.
