= David Mier =

Mexican windsurfer (born 1978)

David Mier y Terán
Personal information
- Full name: David Mauricio Mier y Terán Cuevas
- Born: 7 August 1978 (age 47) Mérida, Yucatán, Mexico
- Height: 171 cm (5 ft 7 in) (2012)
- Weight: 65 kg (143 lb) (2012)

Sailing career
- Sport: Sailing
Medal record
Sailing
Representing Mexico
Pan American Games
| Bronze medal – third place | 2007 Rio | Men's RS:X |
| Bronze medal – third place | 2011 Guadalajara | Men's RS:X |
| Silver medal – second place | 2015 Toronto | Men's RS:X |

David Mauricio Mier y Terán Cuevas (born 7 August 1978) is a windsurfer from Mexico.

Mier was born in Mérida, Yucatán. He began practicing windsurfing at the age of 14, and participated in his first competition at age 15. He has participated at the 2000, 2004, 2008, 2012 and 2016 Summer Olympics.

Mier finished 17th in the men's sailboard event at the 2008 Olympics. In his previous Olympic appearances, he finished 25th in 2000 and 16th in 2004. At the 2012 Summer Olympics, he finished in 32nd place.

Besides participating in the Olympics four times, he has also won bronze medals at the world raceboard championships in 2003 and the 2007 and 2011 Pan American Games. He won gold medals at the Central American championships in 2002, 2006 and 2011, and was the North American champion in 2002, 2003, 2004 and 2011. He has also been
