= Makoto Tomizawa =

Japanese windsurfer (born 1984)

Personal information
- Nationality: Japan
- Born: 19 July 1984 (age 42) Kashiwazaki, Niigata, Japan
- Height: 1.82 m (6 ft 0 in)
- Weight: 73 kg (161 lb)

Sailing career
- Sport: Sailing
- Club: Kanto Auto Works Sailing; Team
- Coached by: Kazuto Seki
- Class: Sailboard

Makoto Tomizawa (富沢 慎, Tomizawa Makoto; born 19 July 1984 in Kashiwazaki, Niigata) is a Japanese windsurfer, who specialized in Neil Pryde RS:X class. He represented Japan in two editions of the Olympic Games (2008 and 2012) and has been currently training for Kanto Auto Works Sailing Team in Kanagawa Prefecture under his personal coach Kazuto Seki. As of September 2013, Tomizawa is ranked no. 42 in the world for the sailboard class by the International Sailing Federation.

Tomizawa made his official debut at the 2008 Summer Olympics in Beijing, where he finished tenth in the men's RS:X class with a net score of 116.

At the 2010 Asian Games in Guangzhou, Tomizawa narrowly missed a chance for the medal after finishing fourth in the men's RS:X class with an accumulated net score of 38 points.

Two years later, Tomizawa qualified for his second Japanese team, as a 28-year-old, in the RS:X class at the 2012 Summer Olympics in London by finishing twenty-sixth and receiving a berth from the ISAF World Championships in Perth, Western Australia. Delivering a mediocre effort in the opening series, Tomizawa pulled off a fourth position to move him up in the overall rankings on the tenth leg, but came up short for the medal race with a net score of 209 points and a twenty-eighth-place finish in a fleet of thirty-eight windsurfers.
