= Daniel Flores (sailor) =

Venezuelan windsurfer

Personal information
- Full name: Daniel Alejandro Flores Peréz
- Nationality: Venezuela
- Born: 17 October 1981 (age 44) Cumaná, Sucre, Venezuela
- Height: 1.70 m (5 ft 7 in)
- Weight: 60 kg (132 lb)

Sport

Sailing career
- Class: Sailboard
- Club: Cumaná Windsurf Club
- Coach: Juan Manuel Moreno

Daniel Alejandro Flores Peréz (born 17 October 1981 in Cumaná, Sucre) is a Venezuelan windsurfer, who specialized in Neil Pryde RS:X class. He represented Venezuela at the 2012 Summer Olympics and has also been training for Cumaná Windsurf Club under his personal coach and mentor Juan Manuel Moreno. As of September 2013, Flores is ranked no. 31 in the world for the sailboard class by the International Sailing Federation.

Flores made his official debut at the 2011 Pan American Games in Guadalajara, Mexico, where he finished sixth in the men's sailboard class with a net score of 52, narrowly missing out a spot for the medal race by a single point.

At the 2012 Summer Olympics in London, Flores competed in the RS:X class having received a birth by his result from the World Championships in Cadiz, Spain. Struggling to attain a top position in the opening series, Flores climbed an astonishing sixteenth position on the final leg, but came up short with an accumulated net score of 252 points and a thirty-first-place finish in a fleet of thirty-eight windsurfers.
