= Luka Mratović =

Croatian windsurfer

Luka Mratović (born April 7, 1987, Split) is a professional sailor representing Croatia. He competed at the 2008, 2012 Summer Olympics and 2016 Summer Olympics in the men's RS-X windsurfing class.
