= Iván Pastor =

Spanish windsurfer

Personal information
- Full name: Iván Pastor Lafuente
- Nationality: Spanish
- Born: 18 February 1980 (age 46) Alicante, Spain
- Height: 177 cm (5 ft 10 in)
- Weight: 73 kg (161 lb)

Sailing career
- Sport: Sailing
- Class(es): RS:X, Mistral, Raceboard, Aloha

Iván Pastor Lafuente (Note: In this Spanish name, the first or paternal surname is Pastor and the second or maternal family name is Lafuente.) (born 18 February 1980 in Alicante) is a Spanish windsurfer. He competed at the men's sailboard event in the 2004 Summer Olympics, when the Mistral class was the sailboard event, and the 2008 and 2012 Summer Olympics when the sailboard class was the RS-X. In 2005 he won a bronze medal at the Mistral European Championship. In addition, he won a silver medal at the 2001 Mediterranean Games held in Tunisia, in the Mistral class.
