= Santiago Grillo =

Colombian windsurfer

Personal information
- Full name: Santiago Enrique Grillo Diez
- Nationality: Colombia
- Born: 27 May 1987 (age 39) Cali, Colombia
- Height: 1.85 m (6 ft 1 in)
- Weight: 70 kg (154 lb)

Sailing career
- Sport: Sailing
- Club: Velas y Vientos
- Coached by: Manuel Fumagallo
- Class: RS:X
Medal record
Representing Colombia
Men's sailing
Bolivarian Games
Gold medal – first place	2013 Trujillo	RS:X
Silver medal – second place	2017 Santa Marta	RS:X

Santiago Enrique Grillo Diez (Note: In this Spanish name, the first or paternal surname is Grillo and the second or maternal family name is Diez.) (born 27 May 1987 in Cali), known as Santiago Grillo, is a Colombian windsurfer who specialized in RS:X class. A two-time Olympian (2008 and 2012), he is ranked no. 82 in the world for the sailboard class by the International Sailing Federation. Grillo also trains for Velas y Vientos in Cali under his Argentina-based personal coach Manuel Fumagallo.

Grillo made his debut at the 2008 Summer Olympics in Beijing, where he finished last out of thirty-five sailors in the men's RS:X class with a net score of 293.

At the 2012 Summer Olympics in London, as a 25 year old, Grillo qualified for his second Colombian team in the RS:X class by attaining a 53rd-place effort and an automatic berth at the World Championships in Cádiz, Spain. Struggling to attain a top position in the opening series, Grillo accumulated a net score of 302 points for a 37th-place finish in a fleet of 38 windsurfers.
