= Zachary Plavsic =

Canadian windsurfer

Personal information
- Nationality: Canada
- Born: January 15, 1983 (age 43) Vancouver, British Columbia, Canada
- Height: 1.85 m (6 ft 1 in)
- Weight: 78 kg (172 lb)
- Website: zacplav.blogspot.ca

Sport
- Sport: Windsurfing
- Event: RS:X
- Club: Royal Vancouver Yacht Club
- Updated on 19 August 2012

Zachary Plavsic (Serbian: Захари Плавишић; born January 15, 1983) is a Canadian windsurfer of Serbian background. Plavsic was born and raised in the city of Vancouver, BC, Canada. He has represented Canada in two Olympic Games. In the 2008 Summer Olympics in Beijing, China, Plavsic finished 23rd. In the 2012 Summer Olympics in London, United Kingdom, Plavsic placed in 8th. In the 2011 ISAF Sailing World Cup, Plavsic finished Second and at the 2011 ISAF Sailing World Championships, Plavsic finished in 12th spot.
