= Wang Aichen =

Chinese windsurfer

Personal information
- Born: 28 March 1985 (age 41) Fushun, Liaoning, China
- Height: 185 cm (6 ft 1 in)
- Weight: 75 kg (165 lb)

Sailing career
- Sport: Sailing
- Club: Liaoning Provincial Sailing Team
- Class: RS:X
Medal record
Men's sailing
Representing China
Asian Games
Gold medal – first place	2010 Guangzhou	RS:X
Gold medal – first place	2014 Incheon	RS:X

Wang Aichen (Chinese: 王爱忱, born 28 March 1985 in Liaoning) is a male Chinese windsurfer. He competed for Team China at the 2008 Summer Olympics (finishing in 7th) and 2012 Summer Olympics in the men's RS-X class (finishing in 18th place).

== Major performances ==
- 1999 National Junior Boardsailing Championships – 1st windsurfing;
- 2003/2004 National Championships – 1st Funboard/Mistral;
- 2006 ISAF Word Sailing Games – 11th NP class;
- 2007 National Champions Tournament – 2nd NP class
