= Gil Cohen (sailor) =

Israeli sailor

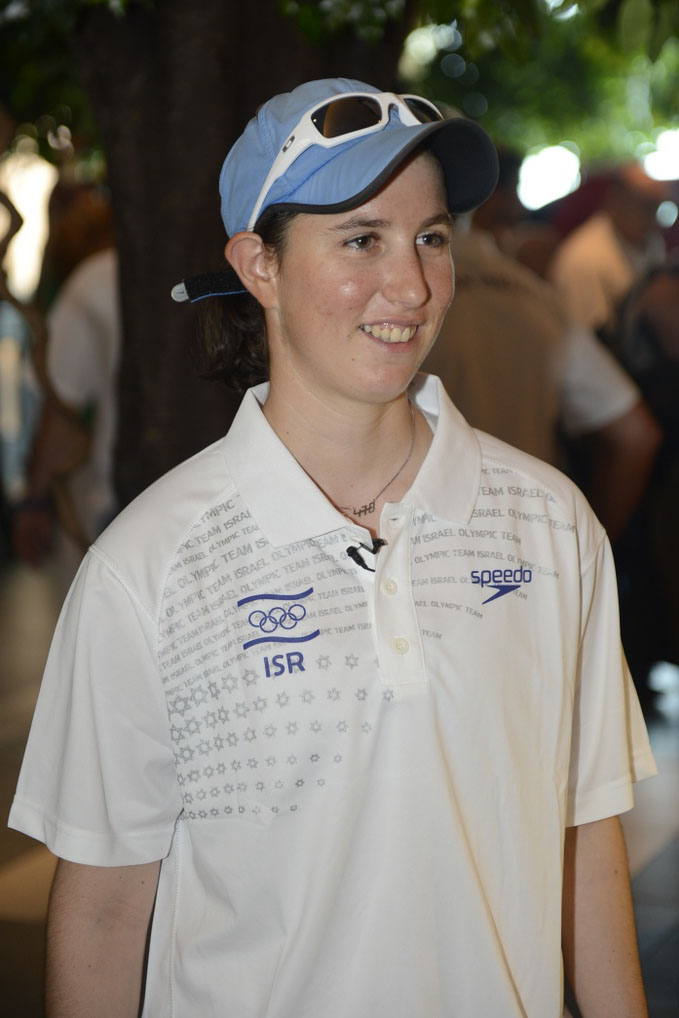
- Gil Cohen at a consolidation event of the Olympic Committee of Israel in Eilat, Israel, in 2012

Personal information
- Native name: גיל כהן
- Born: July 7, 1992 (age 34) Haifa, Israel
- Height: 1.70 m (5 ft 7 in)
- Weight: 57 kg (126 lb)

Sport
- Country: Israel
- Sport: Sailing
- Event: 470
- Club: Hapoel Tel Aviv
- Coached by: Ilan Tashtach
Medal record
Women's sailing
Representing Israel
World Championships
Gold medal – first place	2021 Vilamoura	Mixed 470
Silver medal – second place	2008 Kallithea	Women's 420
Junior World Championships
Silver medal – second place	2009 Thessaloniki	470
- Updated on 9 November 2012

Gil Cohen (Hebrew: גיל כהן; born July 7, 1992) is an Israeli Olympic sports sailor. She competed in sailing in the Women's 470 with Vered Buskila in the 2012 Summer Olympics, and in the same event with Nina Amir in the 2016 Summer Olympics.

== Early life ==
Cohen is Jewish, and was born and raised in Haifa, Israel. She studied there at the Hebrew Reali School.

== Sailing career ==
=== Early years ===
Cohen's sailing club is Hapoel Tel Aviv, and her coach since 2008 has been Ilan Tashtach.

Cohen started sailing at a young age, and was the Israeli national champion on the Optimist in 2005 and 2006, as well as in the 420 discipline in 2007 and 2008.

=== 2008–12 ===
In the 2008 Sailing World Championships she won a silver medal in the 420 discipline.

After changing to the 470 discipline, she won a silver medal a year later, with Dana Mamriev at the 470 Junior World Championships in Thessaloniki, Greece. In 2010 the duo won a bronze medal at the ISAF Sailing World Cup Semaine Olympique Francaise in Hyères, France.

Later in 2010, Vered Buskila and Cohen became a team following Buskila's return to competitive sailing, and Nike Kornecki's continued retirement. In April 2011, the duo won a bronze medal at the ISAF Sailing World Cup Trofeo Princesa Sofía in Palma de Majorca, Spain, and qualified for the 2012 Summer Olympics after finishing 7th at the pre-Olympic tournament. At the 2011 ISAF Sailing World Championships in Perth, Australia, in December 2011, they finished in 4th place.

In August 2012, Cohen (20 years of age at the time) and Buskila finished in 15th place in the Women's 470 at the 2012 Summer Olympics.

=== 2014–present ===
Cohen was hit by a car while riding her bicycle and was seriously injured in October 2014. She underwent surgery, and a long period of rehabilitation. She was not able to compete again until May 2015. In March 2016 Cohen began to compete along with Israeli teenager Nina Amir. They placed 9th in the 2016 Princess Sofia Trophy Regatta in Palma de Mallorca, Spain. Cohen and Amir thereby secured a place in sailing in the 470 event as part of the Israeli 2016 Olympics Team. In April 2016 they placed 18th in the 470 European Championships.

They sailed in the 470 event as part of the Israeli 2016 Olympics Team in Rio in August 2016, with Cohen at the helm and Amir as the crew. They finished in 18th place in the Women's 470.
