= Eyal Levin =

Israeli sailor

Personal information
- Native name: אייל לוין
- Born: August 27, 1986 (age 39) Haifa, Israel
- Height: 1.70 m (5 ft 7 in)
- Weight: 60 kg (132 lb)

Sport
- Country: Israel
- Sport: Sailing
- Event: 470
- Club: Sdot Yam Yacht Club
- Coached by: Udi Gal

Eyal Levin, sometimes written Eyal Levine (Hebrew: אייל לוין; born August 27, 1986) is an Israeli Olympic sailor. He sails with Dan Froyliche.

== Early life ==
Levin's hometown, where he grew up, is Haifa, Israel.

== Sailing career ==
Levin's sailing club is Sdot Yam Yacht Club, in Kibbutz Sdot Yam, Israel. He is coached by Udi Gal.

Levin started sailing and racing at the age of ten, and his first boat was an Optimist single-handed dinghy. The main class that he sails in is the 470 4.7-metres-long double-handed dinghy.

Levin competed four times in the U21 470 World Championships, placing 6th (2003), 4th (2005), 1st (2006), and 4th (2007) with Yam Amir. Levin manned the helm, while Amir was the crew. In 2006, they placed 30th in the 470 European Championships, and in 2007 they placed 23rd. In 2008 they placed 8th in the Europeans, and 34th in the World Championships. In April 2009, they won the Spring Cup event in France.

In 2015, Levin began to compete with Dan Froyliche. They placed 9th at the 470 M World Cup in June 2015, 23rd in the European Championships, and 24th in the 2015 World Championships in Haifa, earning a place as part of Team Israel at the 2016 Summer Olympics.

In 2016, they placed 12th in the Princess Sofia Trophy Regatta, and 26th in the World Championships.

They represented Israel at the 2016 Summer Olympics in sailing in the Men's 470. They finished in 21st place.
