= Nina Amir =

Israeli sailor

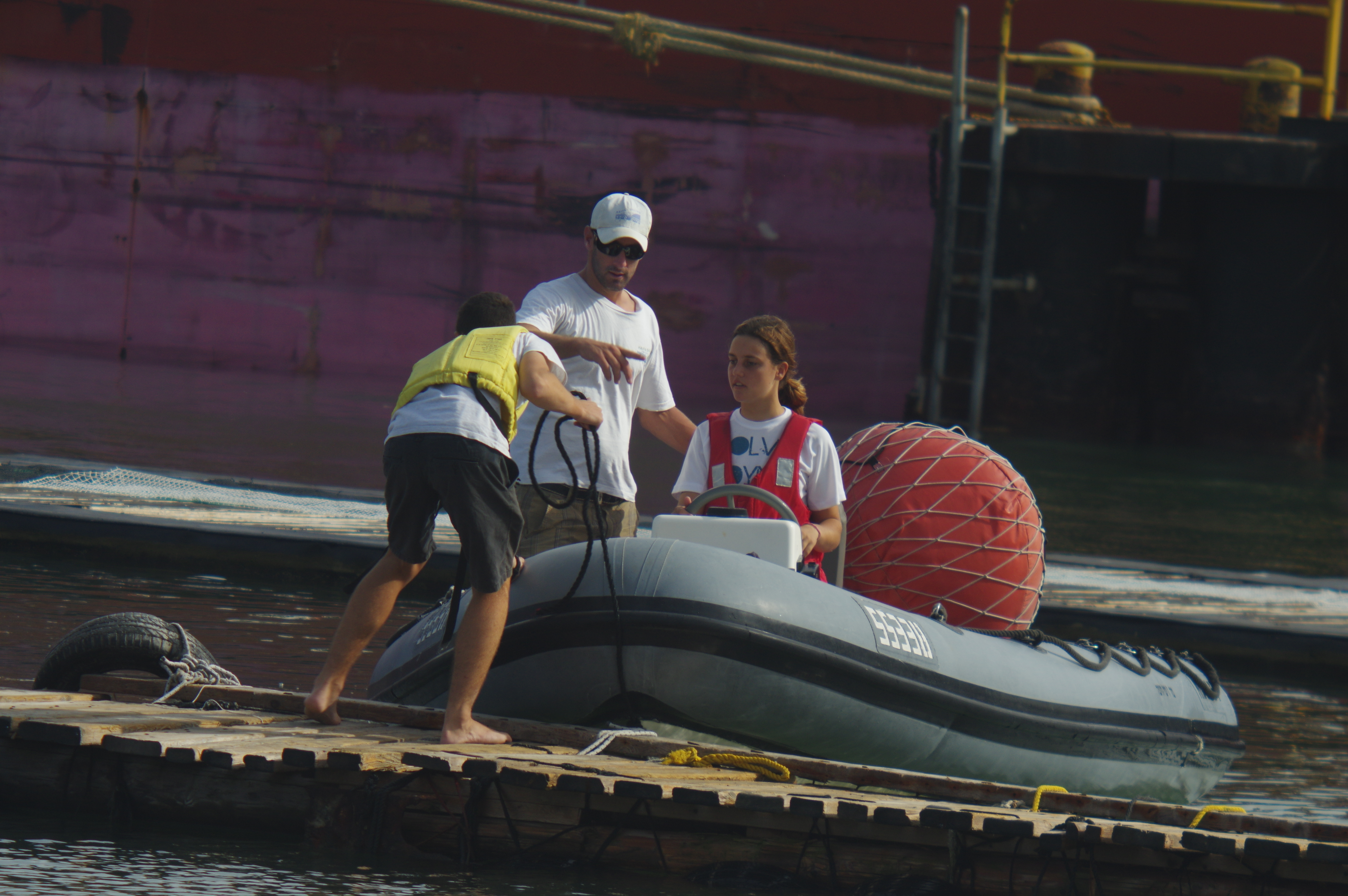

Personal information
- Native name: נינה אמיר
- Born: January 17, 1999 (age 26); Haifa, Israel
- Height: 1.70 m (5 ft 7 in)
- Weight: 62 kg (137 lb)

Sport
- Country: Israel
- Sport: Sailing
- Event: 470
- Club: Haifa Sailing Club
- Coached by: Linor Kliger

Nina Amir (Hebrew: נינה אמיר; born January 17, 1999) is an Israeli Olympic sports sailor.

== Early life ==
Amir is from Haifa, Israel.

== Sailing career ==
Amir started sailing with the Haifa Sailing Club while she was in high school.

In February 2013 Amir and Merav Levanony won the Girls 2013 Israel 420 Sailing Cup. In August 2013 they took 9th in the 420 Junior European Championships.

In 2015 Amir came in second in the 420 discipline in the Israeli national championships.

In March 2016 Amir began to compete along with Olympic sailor Gil Cohen, who had placed 15th in the 2012 London Olympics with Vered Buskila and who had subsequently been seriously injured after she was hit by a car in 2014.

Amir and Cohen placed 9th in the 2016 Princess Sofia Trophy Regatta in Palma de Mallorca, Spain. They thereby secured a place in sailing in the 470 event as part of the Israeli team at the 2016 Summer Olympics.

In April 2016 Amir and Cohen placed 18th in the 470 European Championships.

=== Olympics ===
At 17 years of age, Amir was the youngest athlete on the Israeli team at the 2016 Summer Olympics, having qualified for sailing in the two-person dinghy – 470. She competed with Gil Cohen, with whom she paired up in March 2016 for the first time, and they finished in 18th place in the Women's 470.
