= Gan HaShomron =

Gan HaShomron: גַּן הַשֹּׁמְרוֹן (Hebrew)
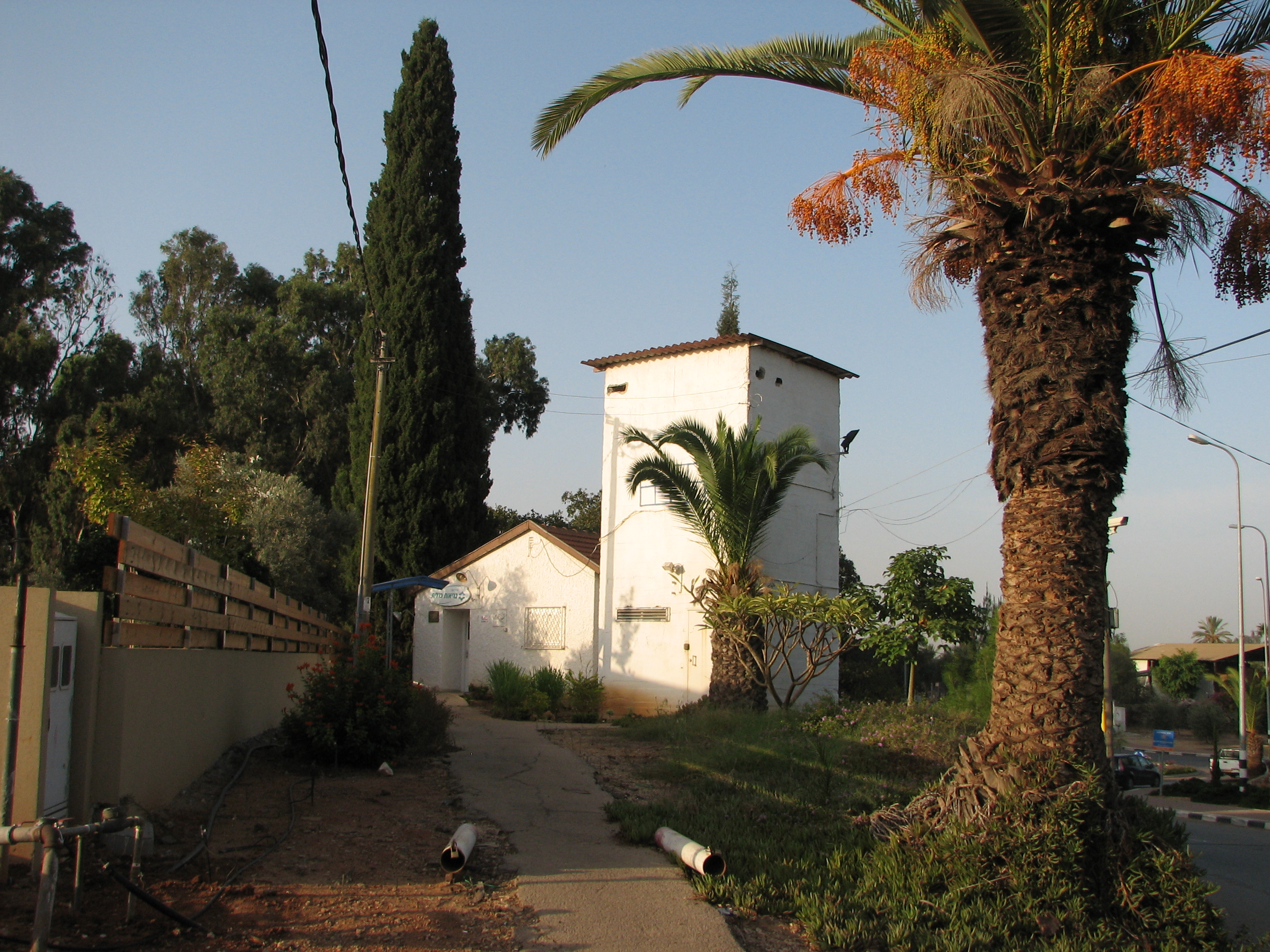
- Etymology: The Samaria Garden
- Location within Haifa region of Israel
- Coordinates: 32°27′48″N 34°59′51″E
- Country: Israel
- District: Haifa
- Subdistrict: Hadera
- Council: Menashe
- Affiliation: Agricultural Union
- Founded: Spring 1934
- Founder: German Jews
- Population (2024): 912

Gan HaShomron (Hebrew: גַּן הַשֹּׁמְרוֹן, גן השומרון) is a moshav in central Israel. Located north-east of Hadera, on the road to Afula, Highway 65, it falls under the jurisdiction of Menashe Regional Council. In 2024 it had a population of 912.

== History ==
The moshav was established in the spring of 1934 by Jewish immigrants from Germany who trained as farmers in Nahalal and Ein Shemer, and was named for its location on at the foot of the Shomron mountains. It was subsequently expanded three times, in 1946 by Jewish veterans of the British army, in 1954 by migration from the cities, and in 1957 by Jewish immigrants from Poland.

== Economic branches ==
The main produce of Gan HaShomron is olive oil. Other produce includes fruit trees.

== Notable residents ==
- Dan Froyliche, Olympic sport sailor
- Gefen Primo (born 2000), judoka
