= Israel at the 2016 Summer Olympics =

- IOC code: ISR
- NOC: Olympic Committee of Israel
- Website: www.olympicsil.co.il (in Hebrew and English)

in Rio de Janeiro
- Competitors: 47 in 17 sports
- Flag bearers: Neta Rivkin (opening); Alona Koshevatskiy (closing)
- Medals Ranked 77th: Gold 0 Silver 0 Bronze 2 Total 2

Summer Olympics appearances (overview)
- 1952; 1956; 1960; 1964; 1968; 1972; 1976; 1980; 1984; 1988; 1992; 1996; 2000; 2004; 2008; 2012; 2016; 2020; 2024

Israel competed at the 2016 Summer Olympics in Rio de Janeiro, Brazil, from 5 to 21 August 2016. It was the nation's sixteenth appearance at the Summer Olympics. The Olympic Committee of Israel confirmed a team of 47 athletes, 22 men and 25 women, to compete across 17 sports at the Games. Breaking its previous record of 43 athletes set in 2008, it was the nation's largest ever delegation sent to the Olympics, until the record was again broken by the 90 athletes delegation to the 2020 Summer Olympics in Tokyo. Among the sports represented by its athletes, Israel marked its Olympic debut in golf (new to the 2016 Games), mountain biking, and triathlon, as well as its return to road cycling, taekwondo, weightlifting, and wrestling after long years of absence. The nation's full roster also reached a historic milestone for Israeli women, as they officially outnumbered the men for the first time.

The Israeli delegation featured 14 returning Olympians. Five of them participated in their third straight Games, namely windsurfer and 2008 bronze medalist Shahar Tzuberi, butterfly and medley swimmer Gal Nevo, synchronized swimmer Anastasia Gloushkov, artistic gymnast Alexander Shatilov, and rhythmic gymnast Neta Rivkin, who was chosen as the nation's flag bearer at the opening ceremony, the first by a female since 1996 and fourth overall in Israel's Olympic history.

Israel returned home from Rio de Janeiro with two bronze medals, each won by judoka Yarden Gerbi (women's 63 kg) and Or Sasson (men's +100 kg), an improvement from the nation's out-of-medal feat at London 2012. Several Israeli athletes advanced to the finals of their respective sporting events, but narrowly missed out of the podium, including the women's rhythmic gymnastics squad (captained by Alona Koshevatskiy) in the group all-around, triple jumper Hanna Knyazyeva-Minenko, and windsurfer Maayan Davidovich in the women's RS:X.

== Background ==
Israel participated in 16 Summer Olympics between its debut at the 1952 Summer Olympics in Helsinki, Finland and the 2016 Summer Olympics in Rio de Janeiro, Brazil. The nation chose rhythmic gymnast Neta Rivkin as its flagbearer in the opening ceremony and rhythmic gymnastics squad captain Alona Koshevatskiy as its flagbearer in the closing ceremony. A total of 47 athletes, 22 men and 25 women, travelled to Rio de Janeiro and competed across 17 sports. It was the nation's largest ever delegation sent to the Olympics, breaking its previous record of 43 athletes set in 2008. Among the sports represented by its athletes, Israel marked its Olympic debut in golf (new to the 2016 Games), mountain biking, and triathlon, as well as its return to road cycling, taekwondo, weightlifting, and wrestling after long years of absence. The nation's full roster also reached a historic milestone on the Israeli women, as they officially outnumbered the men for the first time. Israel has won a total of nine medals up to and including the 2016 Summer Olympics.

== Medalists ==
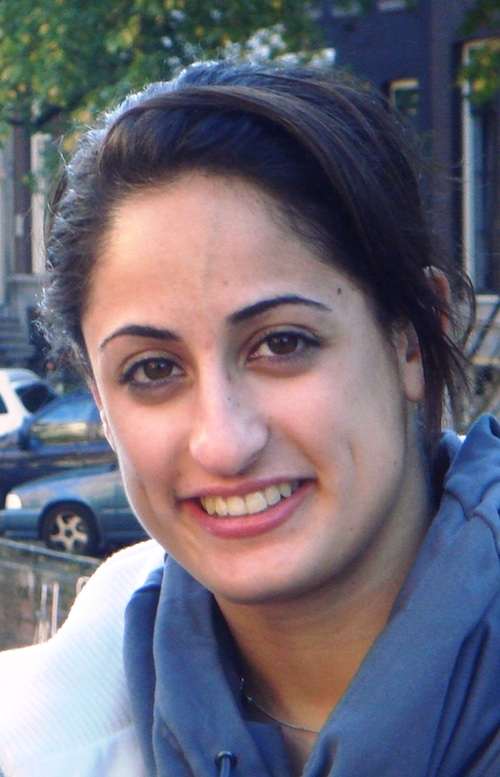
Yarden Gerbi, a judoka

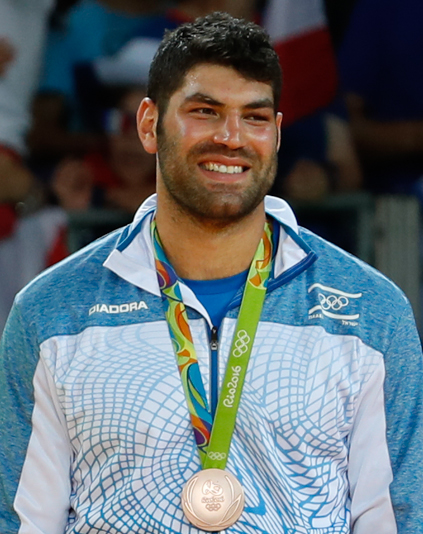
Judoka Or Sasson after winning his bronze medal at the 2016 Summer Olympics

Medal	Name	Sport	Event	Date
Bronze	Yarden Gerbi	Judo	Women's 63 kg	9 August
Bronze	Or Sasson	Judo	Men's +100 kg	12 August

== Competitors ==
The Israeli delegation included 47 athletes competing in 17 sports.

Sport	Men	Women	Total
Athletics	5	3	8
Badminton	1	0	1
Cycling	1	1	2
Golf	0	1	1
Gymnastics	1	6	7
Judo	3	4	7
Sailing	3	3	6
Shooting	1	0	1
Swimming	3	4	7
Synchronized swimming	0	2	2
Taekwondo	1	0	1
Tennis	1	0	1
Triathlon	1	0	1
Weightlifting	1	0	1
Wrestling	0	1	1
Total	22	25	47

== Athletics ==
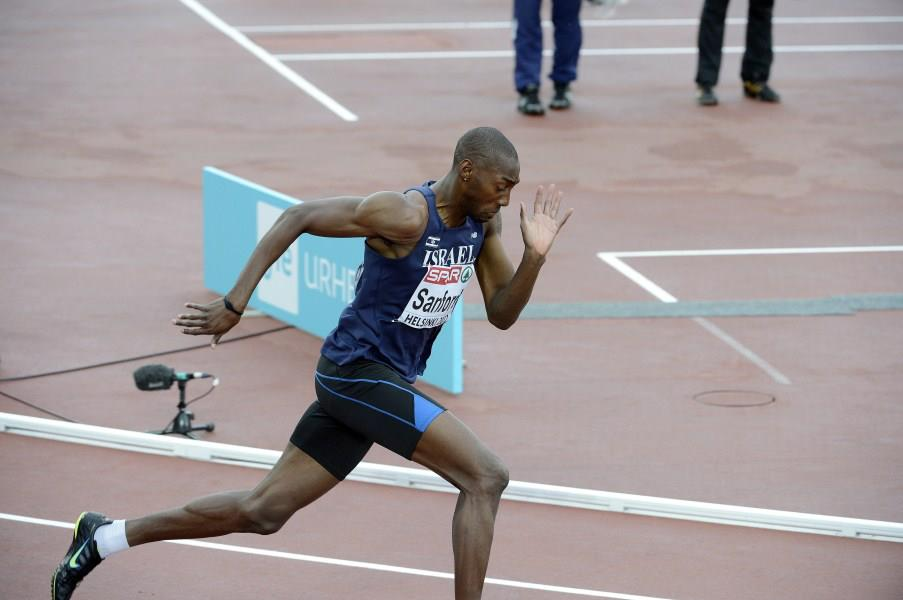
Donald Sanford finishing 4th at the 400 meters dash in the 2012 European Athletics Championships

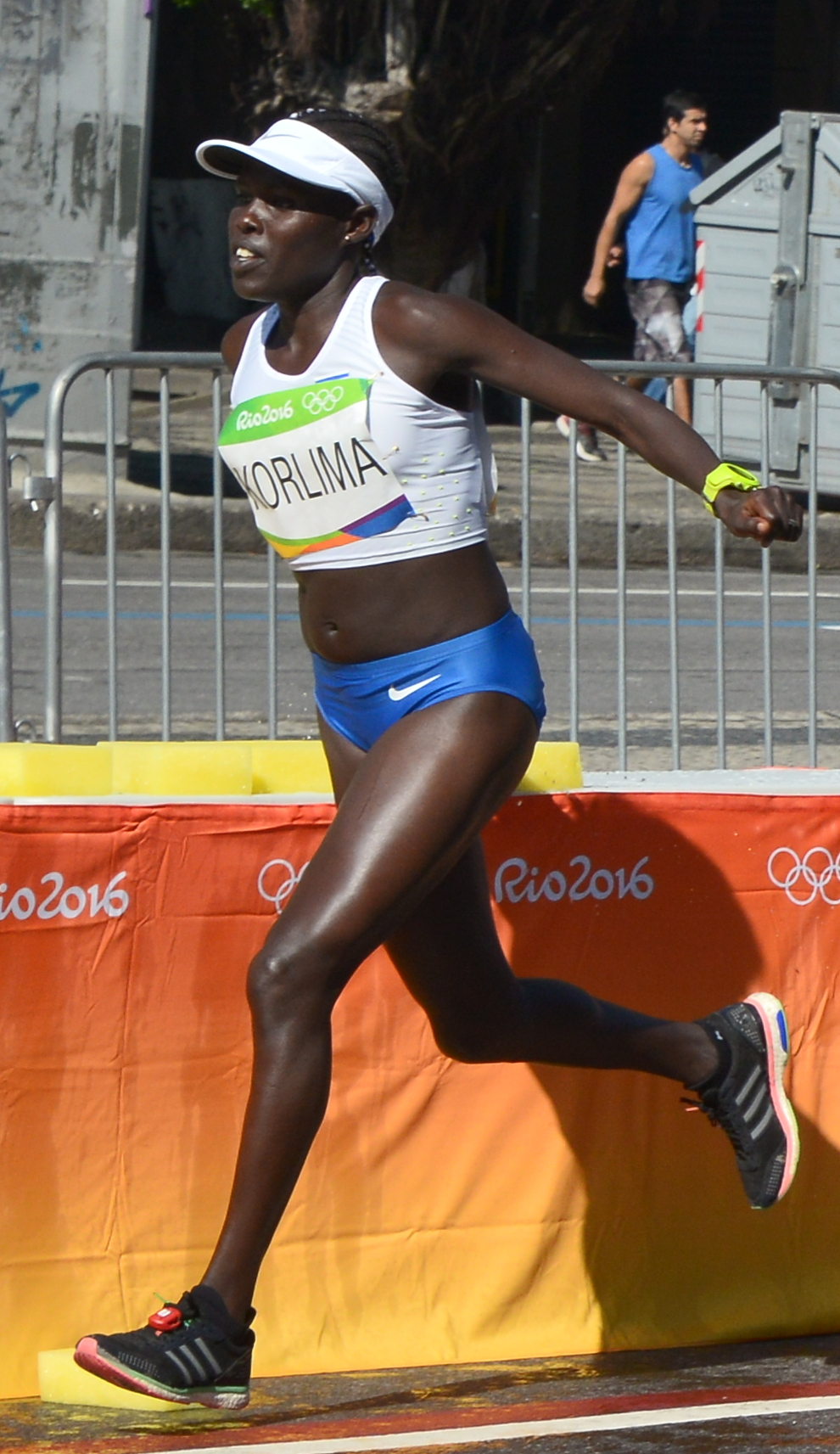
Lonah Chemtai Salpeter in the marathon event of the 2016 Summer Olympics

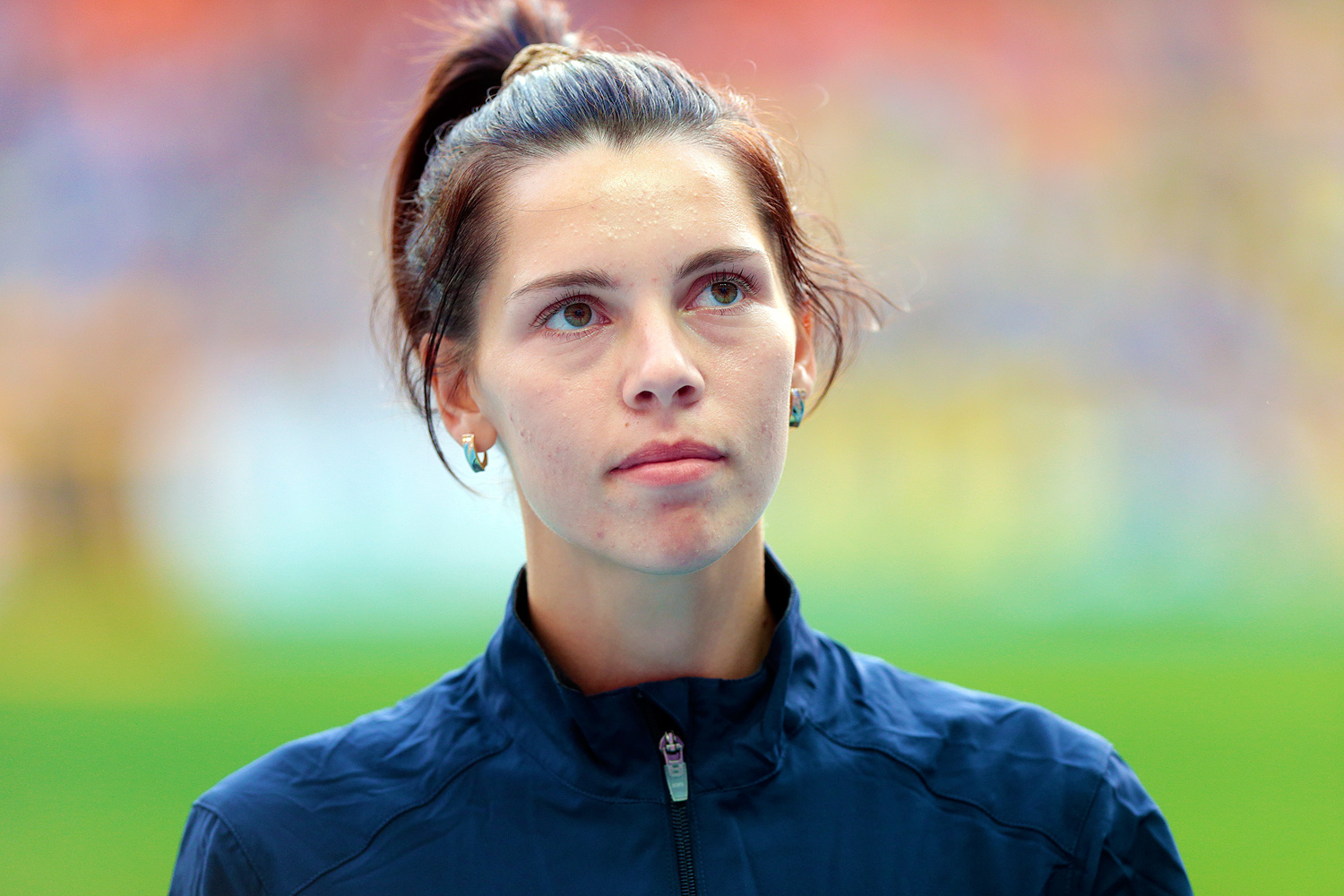
Hanna Knyazyeva-Minenko at the 2013 World Championships in Athletics

Donald Sanford qualified for the men's 400 metres by having a qualifying time of under 45.40 seconds. Sanford finished in his heat with a time of 46.06 seconds, but did not qualify for the semifinals due to finishing in fifth place.

Israel had five marathon runners qualify, three males and two females. They all qualified via the entry standard of 2:19 and 2:45 for men and women, respectively. Lonah Chemtai Salpeter did not finish the marathon. The highest place finish was by Marhu Teferi, finishing in 74th place.

Both Dmitry Kroyter and Hanna Knyazyeva-Minenko competed in field events, with the former competing in high jump and the latter in triple jump. Kroyter did not perform well enough to advance to the final round; he cleared the 2.17 metres (7.1 ft) height on his second try, but failed to clear the 2.22 metres (7.3 ft) height in his three attempts, finishing 41st overall.

Minenko scratched on her first two jumps, and her third jump was long enough for her to place 8th in the round with a distance of 14.2 metres (47 ft). The final round is split into two sets of three jumps, with the top eight from the first set advancing to the second. The longest distance from all six jumps is the distance that is considered for placing. Minenko placed seventh in the first set, with her longest jump from the set being 14.39 metres (47.2 ft). Minenko achieved her season best in the second set of jumps with a length of 14.68 metres (48.2 ft), finishing in fifth place overall.

Key

- Note–Ranks given for track events are within the athlete's heat only
- Q = Qualified for the next round
- q = Qualified for the next round as a fastest loser or, in field events, by position without achieving the qualifying target
- NR = National record
- N/A = Round not applicable for the event
- Bye = Athlete not required to compete in round

Track & road events

Athlete	Event	Heat		Semifinal		Final	
Athlete	Event	Result	Rank	Result	Rank	Result	Rank
Donald Sanford	Men's 400 m	46.06	5	Did not advance			
Ageze Guadie	Men's marathon	—N/a				2:30:45	122
Tesama Moogas	Men's marathon	—N/a				2:30:30	121
Marhu Teferi	Men's marathon	—N/a				2:21:06	74
Lonah Chemtai Salpeter	Women's marathon	—N/a				DNF	
Maor Tiyouri	Women's marathon	—N/a				2:47:27	90

Field events

Athlete	Event	Qualification		Final	
Athlete	Event	Distance	Position	Distance	Position
Dmitry Kroyter	Men's high jump	2.17	41	did not advance	
Hanna Knyazyeva-Minenko	Women's triple jump	14.20	8 q	14.68	5

== Badminton ==
Israel qualified one badminton player for the men's singles into the Olympic tournament. Misha Zilberman, who debuted at the London 2012 Olympic Games as Israel's first badminton Olympian, claimed his Olympic spot as one of the top 34 individual shuttlers in the BWF World Rankings as of 5 May 2016. According to Zilberman, his ambition is "to win a medal at the European or World Championships or the Olympic Games." When it comes to his Olympic training regimen, he said "training under my parents is hard because on the court, they are always trying to push me to my limit." Zilberman's win was Israel's first badminton win at the Olympics. He lost to Chou Tien-chen, and Chou's victory over Yuhan Tan eliminated Zilberman from competition.

Athlete	Event	Group Stage			Elimination	Quarterfinal	Semifinal	Final / BM	
Athlete	Event	Opposition Score	Opposition Score	Rank	Opposition Score	Opposition Score	Opposition Score	Opposition Score	Rank
Misha Zilberman	Men's singles	Chou (TPE); L (9–21, 11–21)	Tan (BEL); W (22–20, 21–12)	2	did not advance				

== Cycling ==
=== Road ===
Israel qualified one rider in the women's Olympic road race, Shani Bloch, by virtue of a top-22 international finish in the 2016 Union Cycliste Internationale (UCI) World Rankings, signifying the nation's Olympic comeback to the sport for the first time since 1960. Bloch had retired in 2004 to start a family, but came out of retirement in 2014, training with her Israeli teammates to qualify for Rio. She was the oldest member of the Rio delegation at the age of 37. On finishing, the race Bloch said "I'm so happy that I managed to finish the race. This gives me an amazing sense of satisfaction. I'm so proud to represent Israel. I thank God for this opportunity." Bloch was ranked 88 in the world at the time of qualification, and finished in 48th place with a time of 4:02:59.

Athlete	Event	Time	Rank
Shani Bloch	Women's road race	4:02:59	48

=== Mountain biking ===
Israel qualified one mountain biker for the men's Olympic cross-country race, as a result of his nation's twenty-second-place finish in the UCI Olympic Ranking List of 25 May 2016. This marked the first time an Israeli competed in the Olympics in mountain biking. Haimy started the race well, sitting in fourth place after the first kilometer. Haimy was passed by several competitors when his bike tire was punctured. The puncture caused him to fall to 44th place. He continued the race and finished in 29th place with a time of 1:43:30, slightly over 10 minutes behind the winner.

Athlete	Event	Time	Rank
Shlomi Haimy	Men's cross-country	1:43:30	29

== Golf ==
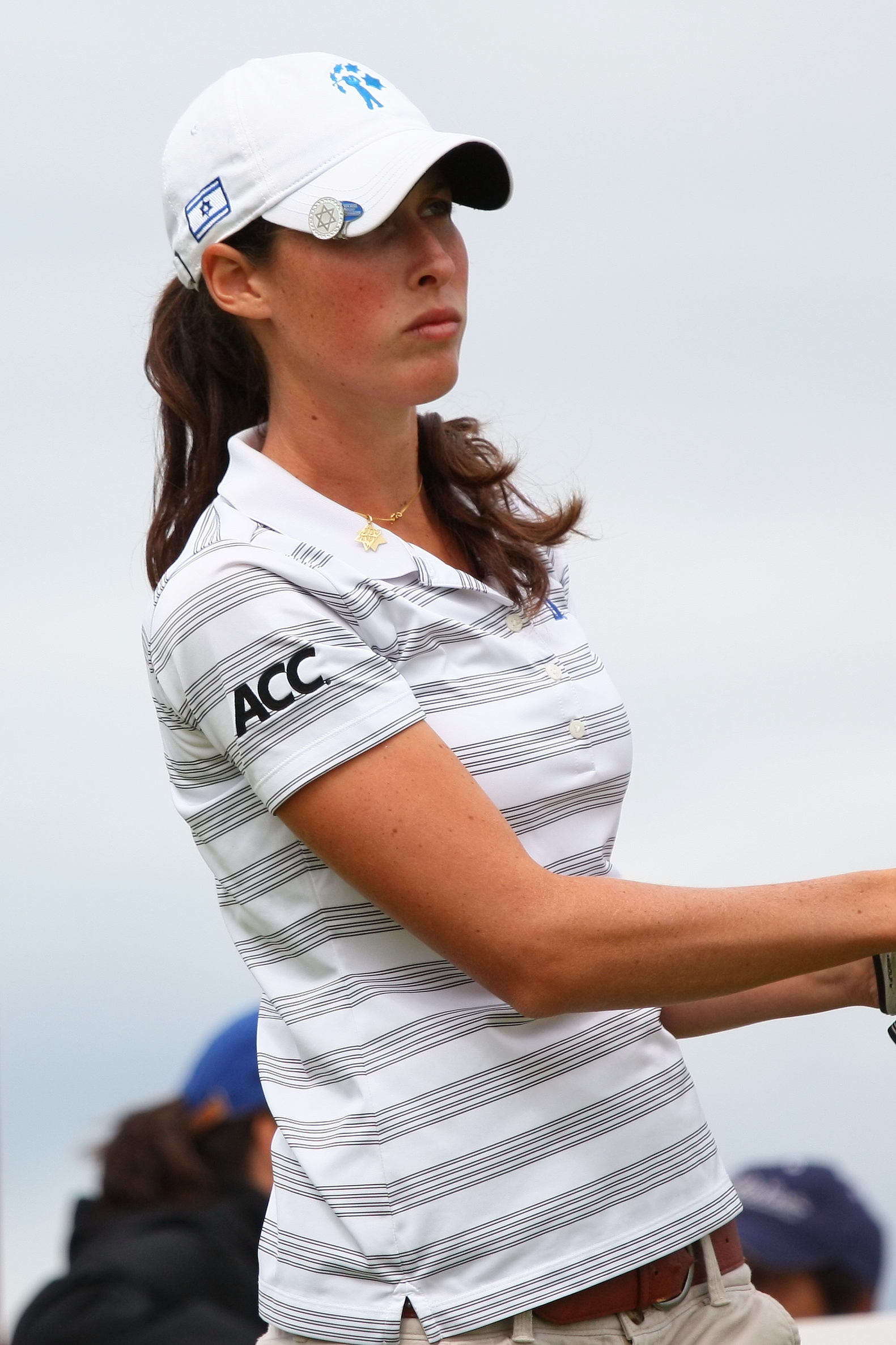
Laetitia Beck in the final practice round of 2013 Ricoh Women's British Open

Israel entered one golfer into the Olympic tournament. Laetitia Beck (world no. 237) qualified directly among the top 60 eligible players for the women's event based on the International Golf Federation (IGF) World Rankings as of 11 July 2016. This marked the first time Israel sent a golfer to the Olympics. Due to Israel's inexperience representing golf athletes, Beck was required to procure all of her equipment to prepare for Rio, such as her uniform and hats. Israel's Olympic committee reimbursed her for the equipment. On the topic of representing Israel at the Olympics, Beck said "I think it's because of what my grandparents had to go through, not just my grandparents but everyone during World War II, all the Jewish people during World War II and the holocaust, that obviously brings me anger, but i think what i'm trying to do is bring the anger and try to do something meaningful." Beck finished tied for 31st with a score of two over par. Her best round was the third round, where she was tied for 13th place.

Athlete	Event	Round 1	Round 2	Round 3	Round 4	Total		
Athlete	Event	Score	Score	Score	Score	Score	Par	Rank
Laetitia Beck	Women's	75	70	71	70	286	+2	=31

== Gymnastics ==
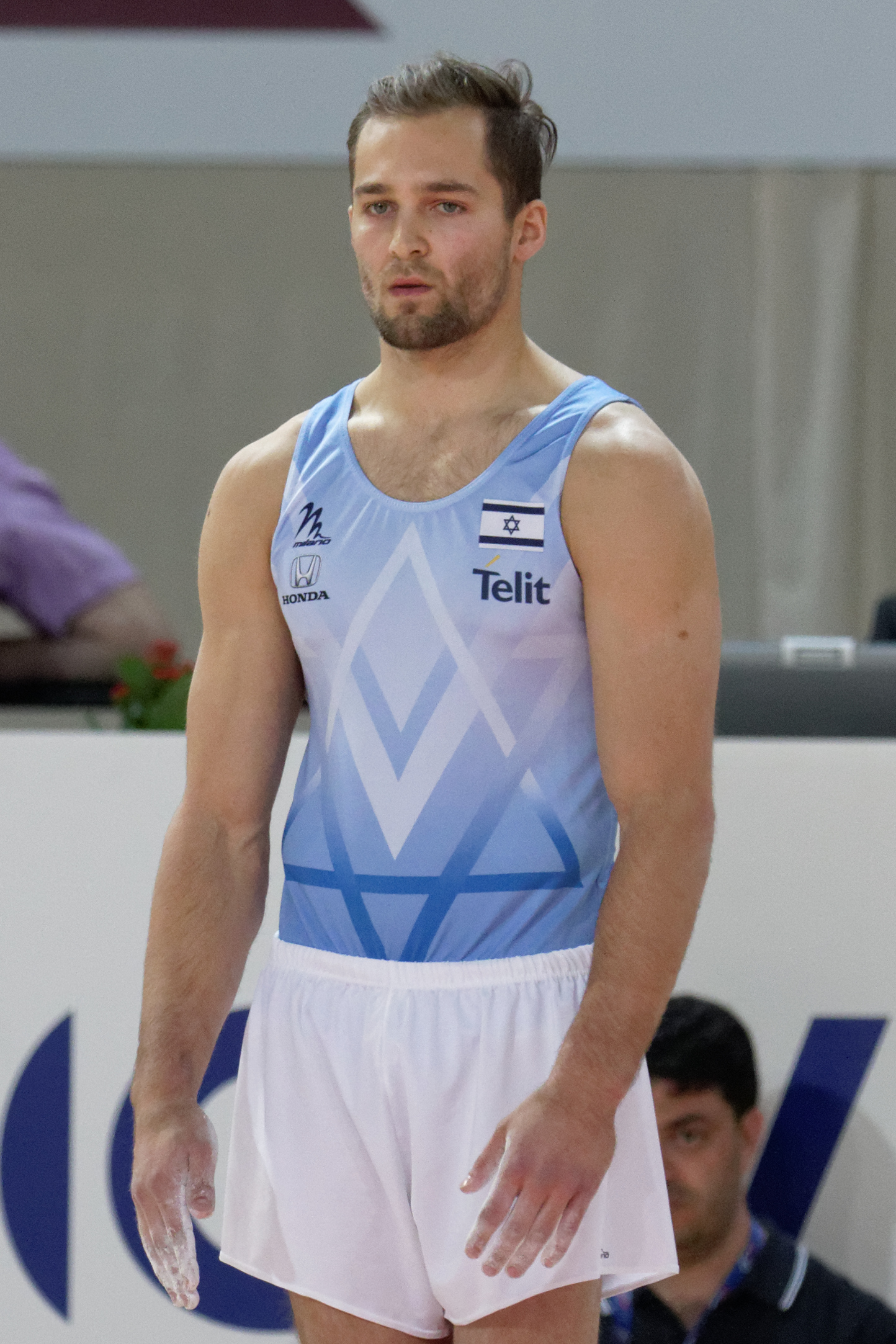
Alexander Shatilov at the 2015 European Artistic Gymnastics Championships

=== Artistic ===
Israel entered one artistic gymnast into the Olympic competition. Two-time Olympian Alexander Shatilov qualified and claimed his Olympic spot in the men's apparatus and all-around events via the Olympic Test Event in Rio de Janeiro by participation. Shatilov participated in both the London and Beijing Olympics. He did not advance following the qualification round in the floor and horizontal bar events due to not achieving eighth place or higher in either. Shatilov's loss in the qualification rounds makes Rio his worst Olympic finish ever. In regards to the loss, he said "things didn't go as I planned, but that happens in sport and there's nothing I can do about it. You need to know how to cope with disappointments and life continues. I trained hard and wanted to have a good competition, but you can't turn the clock back. I started my floor drill well, but a small mistake cost me and I knew I had no chance after that. I never imagined a scenario like this." He performed poorly in both the floor and bar routines, scoring 13.5 points in the floor routine, and 14.066 points in the bar routine. The floor exercise was riddled with errors and ended with a landing where it appeared as if he was trying to break a fall.

Men

Athlete	Event	Qualification								Final							
Athlete	Event	Apparatus						Total	Rank	Apparatus						Total	Rank
Athlete	Event	F	PH	R	V	PB	HB	Total	Rank	F	PH	R	V	PB	HB	Total	Rank
Alexander Shatilov	Floor	13.500	—N/a					13.500	58	did not advance							
Alexander Shatilov	Horizontal bar	—N/a					14.066	14.066	44	did not advance							

=== Rhythmic ===
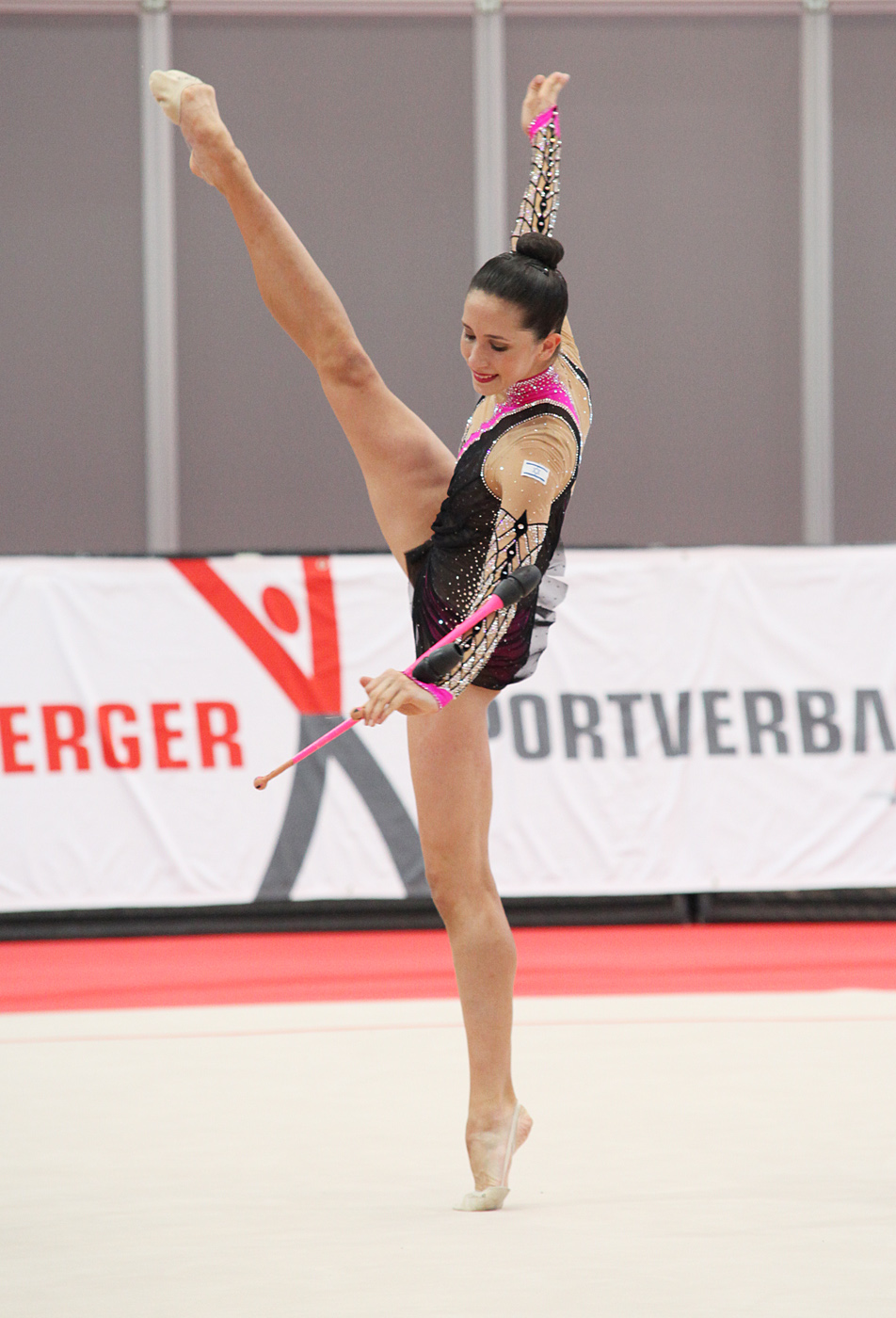
Neta Rivkin at the Rhythmic Gymnastics Grand Prix in Austria

Israel qualified a squad of rhythmic gymnasts for the individual and group all-around by finishing in the top 15 (for individual) and top 10 (for group) at the 2015 World Championships in Stuttgart, Germany. The competitors in the team event all made their first Olympic debut. The group was considered Israel's best chance for a gold at the Olympics after they had finished in first place for the hoops and clubs disciplines at the European Championships. In the first round, Israel finished in sixth place. The team performed worse in the second round, with their score the worst among all teams. The group all-around achieved a total of 34.883 points and qualified for the final after finishing in sixth place in the qualification round. The team finished in sixth place again in the finals round with a total of 34.549 and did not win a medal.

Neta Rivkin was the flag bearer of the Israeli team at Rio's opening ceremony, her third Olympic Games, at the age of 24. In her first rotation, the ball, she scored 17.866 and was in 6th place out of 26 competitors, but she dropped the hoop and ribbon in her next two rotations. She came in 13th overall in the individual qualification round, with a total score of 69.223 points, and consequently did not advance into the top 10 finals. Rivkin announced her retirement from gymnastics in a press conference following the Olympics.

Athlete	Event	Qualification						Final					
Athlete	Event	Hoop	Ball	Clubs	Ribbon	Total	Rank	Hoop	Ball	Clubs	Ribbon	Total	Rank
Neta Rivkin	Individual	17.041	17.866	17.533	16.783	69.223	13	did not advance					

Athlete	Event	Qualification				Final			
Athlete	Event	5 ribbons	3 clubs 2 hoops	Total	Rank	5 ribbons	3 clubs 2 hoops	Total	Rank
Alona Koshevatskiy; Ekaterina Levina; Karina Lykhvar; Ida Mayrin; Yuval Filo	Team	17.250	17.633	34.883	6 Q	17.166	17.383	34.549	6

== Judo ==
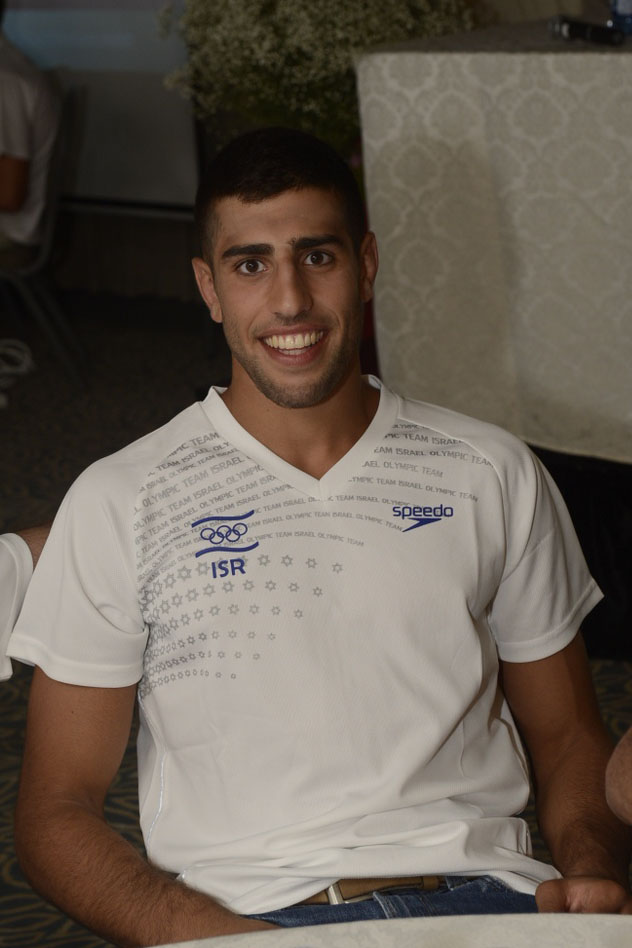
Golan Pollack, a judoka

Israel qualified seven judokas for the Games. Six of them (three per gender), including 2015 European champion Sagi Muki and London 2012 Olympian Golan Pollack, were ranked among the top 22 eligible judokas for men and top 14 for women in the International Judo Federation (IJF) World Ranking List as of 30 May 2016. Shira Rishony earned a continental quota spot from the European region as Israel's top-ranked judoka outside of direct qualifying position for the women's extra-lightweight (48 kg) class.

During the first two days of competition, the Israeli judokas did not win a match. Shira Rishony has lost in the first round after she was disqualified for illegally touching her opponent's leg. Golan Pollack lost by ippon in the second round. Also in the second round, Gili Cohen led during the first three minutes of the fight after her opponent got two shido, but lost by yuko.

On the third day, Sagi Muki competed in the Men's 73 kg. He started the competition at the second round. During his first match, which was against Rok Drakšič, he won by ippon. In the third round, he won by points after he scored a waza-ari during the fight. He defeated Nick Delpopolo at the quarterfinals with an ippon. Muki lost in the semifinals by points after his opponent got yuko during the fight. Muki lost the fight for the bronze medal by ippon to Lasha Shavdatuashvili and finished in fifth place. At the end of the competition, Muki revealed that he suffered from two slipped discs a month before the games and that he ruptured two ankle ligaments a month earlier.

During the fourth day Yarden Gerbi won a bronze medal in the women's 63 kg. She started the competition at the second round with a win by waza-ari, awasete ippon. Gerbi lost in the quarterfinals by points after her opponent Mariana Silva got yuko during the fight. At the repechage, she won by points with a waza-ari. Finally, she won the fight for the bronze medal by points with yuko and waza-ari.

Linda Bolder competed on the fifth day. She started the competition with two wins. During her first round match, she won by ippon after a waza-ari and at the second round, she won by points with a waza-ari. Bolder lost in the quarterfinals by ippon. She lost also at the repechage to María Bernabéu.

On the last day of the competition, Or Sasson won a bronze medal in the Men's +100 kg. He won the first round by waza-ari, awasete-ippon against Egyptian judoka Islam El Shehaby. El Shehaby refused to shake Sasson hand at the end of the match. At the second round, he won by points with a waza-ari. Sasson defeated Roy Meyer at the quarterfinals by points with a waza-ari but lost in the semifinals by points after Teddy Riner got waza-ari during the fight. Sasson won the fight for the bronze medal by a penalty.

Men

Athlete	Event	Round of 64	Round of 32	Round of 16	Quarterfinals	Semifinals	Repechage	Final / BM	
Athlete	Event	Opposition Result	Opposition Result	Opposition Result	Opposition Result	Opposition Result	Opposition Result	Opposition Result	Rank
Golan Pollack	−66 kg	Bye	Punza (ZAM); L 000–100	did not advance					
Sagi Muki	−73 kg	Bye	Drakšič (SLO); W 100–000	Wandtke (GER); W 010–000	Delpopolo (USA); W 100–000	Orujov (AZE); L 000–001	—N/a	Shavdatuashvili (GEO); L 000–100	5
Or Sasson	+100 kg	—N/a	El Shehaby (EGY); W 100–000	Sarnacki (POL); W 010–000	Meyer (NED); W 010–000	Riner (FRA); L 000–010	—N/a	Mendoza (CUB); W 000–000 S	(bronze)

Women

Athlete	Event	Round of 32	Round of 16	Quarterfinals	Semifinals	Repechage	Final / BM	
Athlete	Event	Opposition Result	Opposition Result	Opposition Result	Opposition Result	Opposition Result	Opposition Result	Rank
Shira Rishony	−48 kg	Cherniak (UKR); L 000–100	did not advance					
Gili Cohen	−52 kg	Bye	Legentil (MRI); L 000–001	did not advance				
Yarden Gerbi	−63 kg	Bye	Espinosa (CUB); W 100–001	M Silva (BRA); L 000–001	Did not advance	Yang Jx (CHN); W 010–000	Tashiro (JPN); W 011–000	(bronze)
Linda Bolder	−70 kg	Mabika (ROT); W 110–000	Kim S-y (KOR); W 010–000	Conway (GBR); L 000–100	Did not advance	Bernabéu (ESP); L 000–000 S	Did not advance	7

== Sailing ==
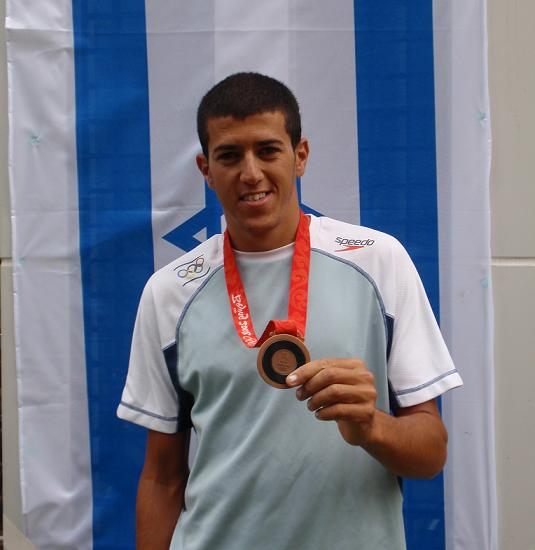
Shahar Tzuberi with the bronze medal from the 2008 Summer Olympics

Israel entered six athletes into the sailing competition at the Olympics. For the RS:X class, Maayan Davidovich won the bronze medal at the women's event in the 2014 ISAF Sailing World Championships while Nimrod Mashiah finished eleventh place at the Men's event. Both of them secured a place for Israel in the Olympics. In April 2016, Davidovich and Shahar Tzuberi, Beijing 2008 bronze medalist, secured their spots on Israel's Olympic delegation. Tzuberi defeated Mashiah in the battle for representing Israel at the Olympics. This was the third time Tzuberi participated at the Olympic Games and the second time for Davidovich. Davidovich finished ninth in the final race, taking 24 minutes and 46 seconds to complete her sail. Her overall ranking was seventh with 78 net points. Before the final race, she was ranked fifth with 60 net points. Tzuberi failed to qualify for the finals and finished seventeenth with 160 net points.

At the 470 class, Dan Froyliche and Eyal Levin secured a place for the Games by managing to finish twenty-fourth in the men's event at the 2015 470 World Championships that took place in Haifa. Nina Amir and Gil Cohen first teamed up in March 2016. In their first competition together at the Trofeo Princesa Sofía, they finished in ninth place and secured a place on the Israeli sailing team for the Games. This was the second time Cohen represented Israel at the Olympics. The two teams failed to qualify for the finals. Amir and Cohen finished seventeenth with 120 net points. Froyliche and Levin finished twenty-first with 152 net points.

Key

- M = Medal race
- EL = Eliminated – did not advance into the medal race
- N/A = Round not applicable for the event
- DNF = Did not finish
- DSQ = Disqualified

Athlete	Event	Race													Net points	Final rank
Athlete	Event	1	2	3	4	5	6	7	8	9	10	11	12	M	Net points	Final rank
Shahar Tzuberi	Men's RS:X	9	17	20	22	DNF; ~~(37)~~	18	19	6	7	17	21	4	EL	160	17
Dan Froyliche; Eyal Levin	Men's 470	7	15	17	21	21	20	16	19	~~22~~	16	—N/a		EL	152	21
Maayan Davidovich	Women's RS:X	5	6	6	11	4	3	2	~~15~~	14	5	2	2	9	78	7
Nina Amir; Gil Cohen	Women's 470	DSQ; ~~(21)~~	9	19	15	17	17	15	5	10	13	—N/a		EL	120	17

== Shooting ==
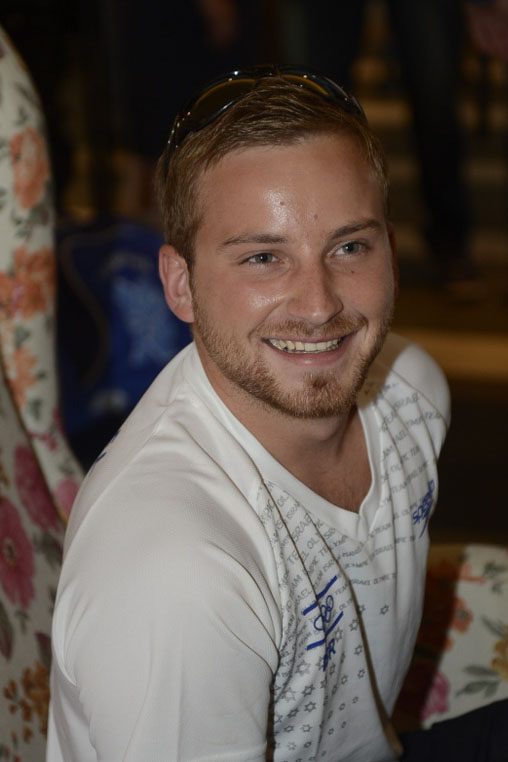
Sergey Rikhter, an Israeli sharpshooter

Sergey Richter qualified to compete in the event by winning a medal in the 2015 European Games. This was Richter's second Olympics. He placed 9th at the London Olympics, missing the finals by one place. In regards to qualifying for Rio, Richter said "the pressure ahead of Baku was unbearable and it took me a few seconds to regain my composure in the final once I realized I clinched my place in the Olympics." Richter scored 623.8 out of a possible 654.0 points during the qualification round of the 10 m air rifle. He would have needed a score of at least 625.5 to qualify for the finals. For the 50 m rifle prone, he scored 622.6 points. He required a score of at least 624.8 to qualify for the final round.

Athlete	Event	Qualification		Final	
Athlete	Event	Points	Rank	Points	Rank
Sergey Richter	Men's 10 m air rifle	623.8	14	did not advance	
Sergey Richter	Men's 50 m rifle prone	622.6	15	Did not advance	

Qualification Legend: Q = Qualify for the next round; q = Qualify for the bronze medal (shotgun)

== Swimming ==
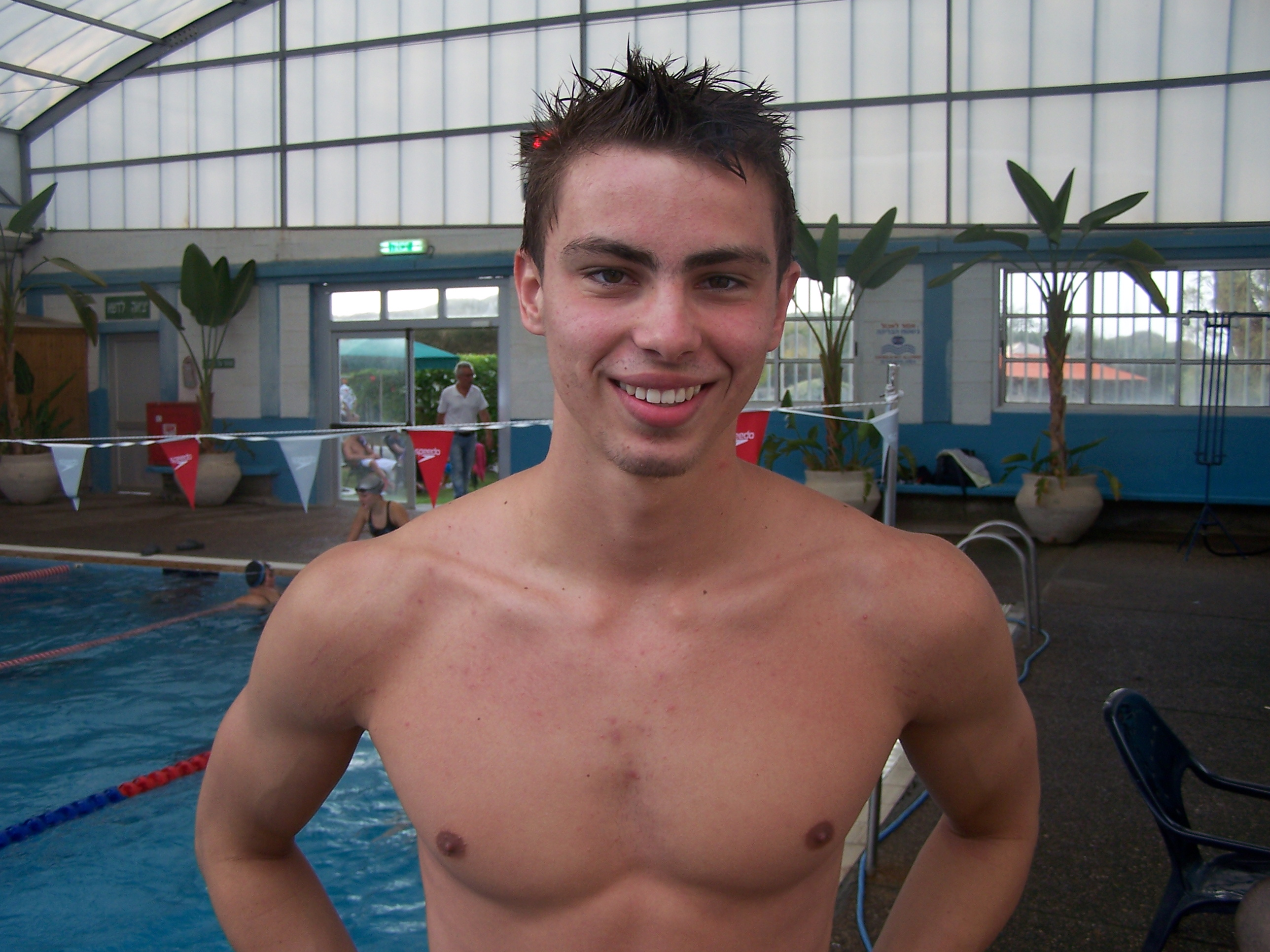
Yakov-Yan Toumarkin in the Israeli Championships for swimming in 2010

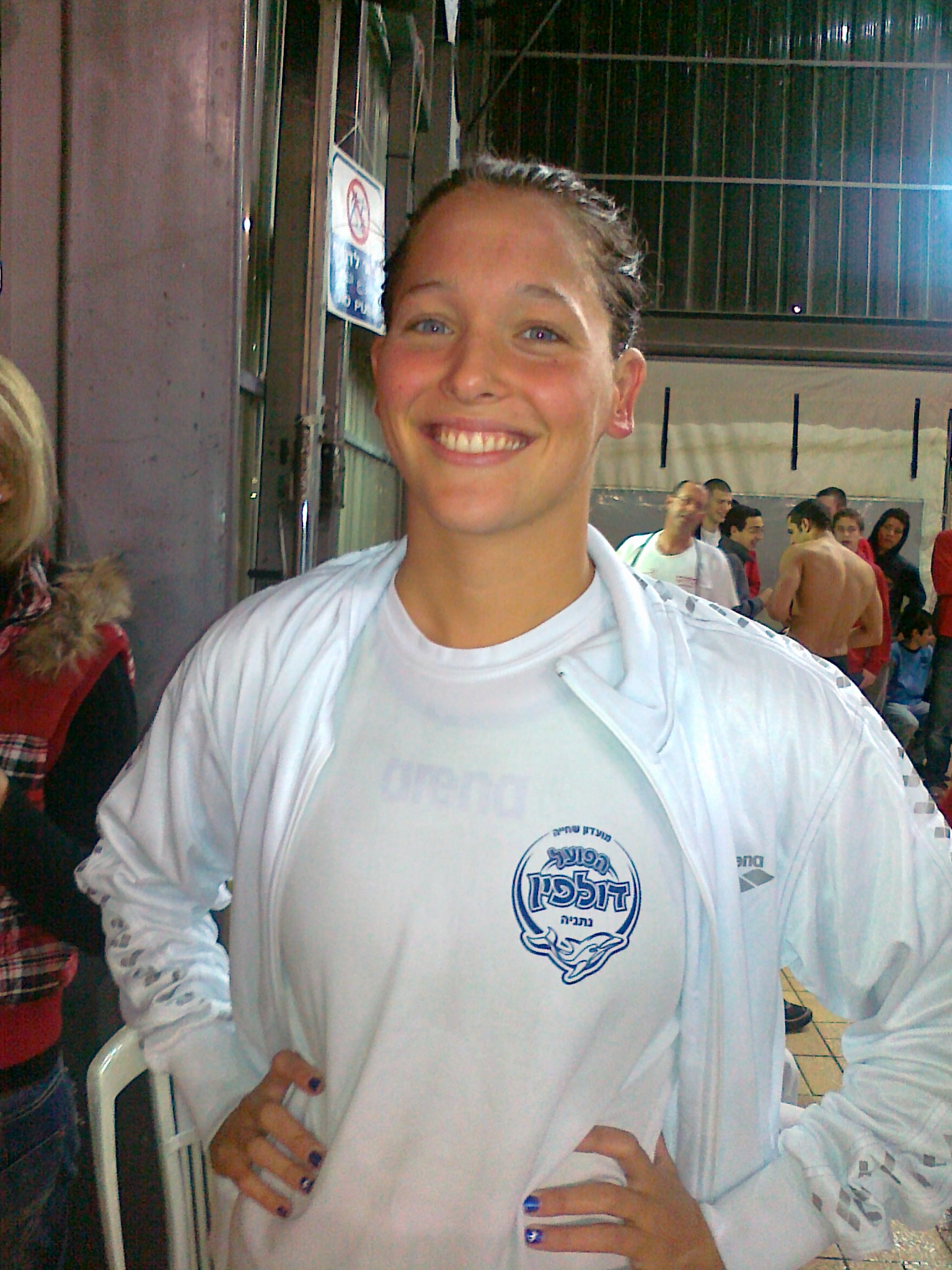
Keren Siebner after winning a gold medal in 50 m freestyle at Israel Swimming Championships (25-meter pool)

Seven athletes qualified in the swimming events - six in individual events and one (Keren Siebner) in the relay events. The qualifying standards are up to a maximum of 2 swimmers in each event at the Olympic Qualifying Time (OQT), and potentially 1 at the Olympic Selection Time (OST).

Yakov Toumarkin qualified at the 2015 Israel swimming State Cup after finishing the men's 200 metre backstroke final in 1:58.20 minutes. He competed in the men's 100 and 200 metre backstroke and was the only swimmer who managed to qualify for the semifinals but did not advance to the finals. Ziv Kalontorov qualified at the 2015 European Games after he won a gold medal in the men's 50 metre freestyle with a time of 22.16 seconds, breaking the Israeli record. He competed in the men's 50 and 100 metre freestyle. Gal Nevo qualified after he won a silver medal at the 2016 European Aquatics Championships in London in the men's 200 metre individual medley with a time of 1:59.69 minutes. He competed in the men's 200 metre butterfly, 200 and 400 metre individual medley.

Andrea Murez and Amit Ivry qualified at the 2015 Israel swimming State Cup. Murez qualified after finishing the women's 50 metre freestyle in 25.12 seconds, which registered a new national record time. She competed in the women's 50 and 100 metre freestyle buy did not start in the 200 metre freestyle. She also competed in the 4×100 metre freestyle relay. Ivry qualified after finishing the women's 100 metre breaststroke in 1:07.47 minutes and broke the national record she set at 2014. She competed in the women's 100 and 200 metre breaststroke and the 100 metre butterfly. Zohar Shikler qualified at the 2016 Israel swimming State Cup after finishing the women's 50 metre freestyle in 25.18 seconds. She also competed in the women's 50 metre freestyle.

Keren Siebner competed with Murez, Ivry and Shikler in the women's 4×100 metre freestyle relay after FINA reviewed swimmers' results of all relay teams and found out that one of the relay teams did not meet the qualifications. They finished sixteenth with a time of 3:41.97 minutes.

Men

Athlete	Event	Heat		Semifinal		Final		Summary
Athlete	Event	Time	Rank	Time	Rank	Time	Rank	Rank
Ziv Kalontarov	50 m freestyle	22.80	41	Did not advance				42
Ziv Kalontarov	100 m freestyle	50.64	45	Did not advance				46
Gal Nevo	200 m butterfly	1:58.64	26	Did not advance				26
Gal Nevo	200 m individual medley	1:59.80	17	Did not advance				17
Gal Nevo	400 m individual medley	4:18.29	19	—N/a		did not advance		19
Yakov Toumarkin	100 m backstroke	54.66	27	did not advance				27
Yakov Toumarkin	200 m backstroke	1:57.58	16 Q	1:58.63	15	did not advance		15

Women

Athlete	Event	Heat		Semifinal		Final	
Athlete	Event	Time	Rank	Time	Rank	Time	Rank
Amit Ivry	100 m breaststroke	1:09.42	29	Did not advance			
Amit Ivry	200 m breaststroke	2:31.49	28	Did not advance			
Amit Ivry	100 m butterfly	59.42	26	did not advance			
Andrea Murez	50 m freestyle	25.41	35	Did not advance			
Andrea Murez	100 m freestyle	55.47	30	did not advance			
Andrea Murez	200 m freestyle	DNS		did not advance			
Zohar Shikler	50 m freestyle	25.38	33	Did not advance			
Amit Ivry; Andrea Murez; Zohar Shikler; Keren Siebner	4 × 100 m freestyle relay	3:41.97	16	—N/a		did not advance	

== Synchronized swimming ==
Israel fielded a squad of two synchronized swimmers to compete in the women's duet by virtue of their twelfth-place finish at the FINA Olympic test event in Rio de Janeiro. Anastasia Gloushkov competed in her fourth Olympics, becoming the first Israeli woman to compete in four Olympics. Even though Gloushkov gave birth after the London Olympics, she still trained enough to compete in the Rio Olympics. The duo scored 79.4488 points in the technical routine, placing 20th in that portion. They placed 21st in the free routine, scoring 78.9000 points. Their combined score was 158.3488, garnering 20th place overall. To qualify for the finals, they required a score better than 170.3304 points.

Athlete	Event	Free routine (preliminary)		Technical routine			Free routine (final)		
Athlete	Event	Points	Rank	Points	Total (technical + free)	Rank	Points	Total (technical + free)	Rank
Anastasia Gloushkov; Ievgeniia Tetelbaum	Duet	78.9000	21	79.4488	158.3488	20	did not advance		

== Taekwondo ==
Israel entered one athlete into the taekwondo competition at the Olympics. Ron Atias secured a place in the men's flyweight category (58 kg) by virtue of his top two finish at the 2016 European Qualification Tournament in Istanbul, Turkey. He is the first-ever Israeli male taekwondo athlete to compete in the Olympics.

In the first round, Teixeira connected with a head kick for three points. He delivered another blow to Atias' head in the second round, bringing the score to 8:0. Atias' coach got the score adjusted to 7:0 after a discussion with the judges. Teixeira's success continued, scoring 16 total points by the end of the third round. Atias' only scored two points after being penalized for an illegal kick to the legs. Atias lost in the round of 16 against Venilton Teixeira from Brazil by point gap of 2–16. Atias would have had a chance to compete for the bronze medal if Teixeira reached the finals, however he failed to do so and therefore Atias was eliminated from competition.

Athlete	Event	Round of 16	Quarterfinals	Semifinals	Repechage	Final / BM	
Athlete	Event	Opposition Result	Opposition Result	Opposition Result	Opposition Result	Opposition Result	Rank
Ron Atias	Men's −58 kg	Teixeira (BRA); L 2–16 PTG	did not advance				

== Tennis ==
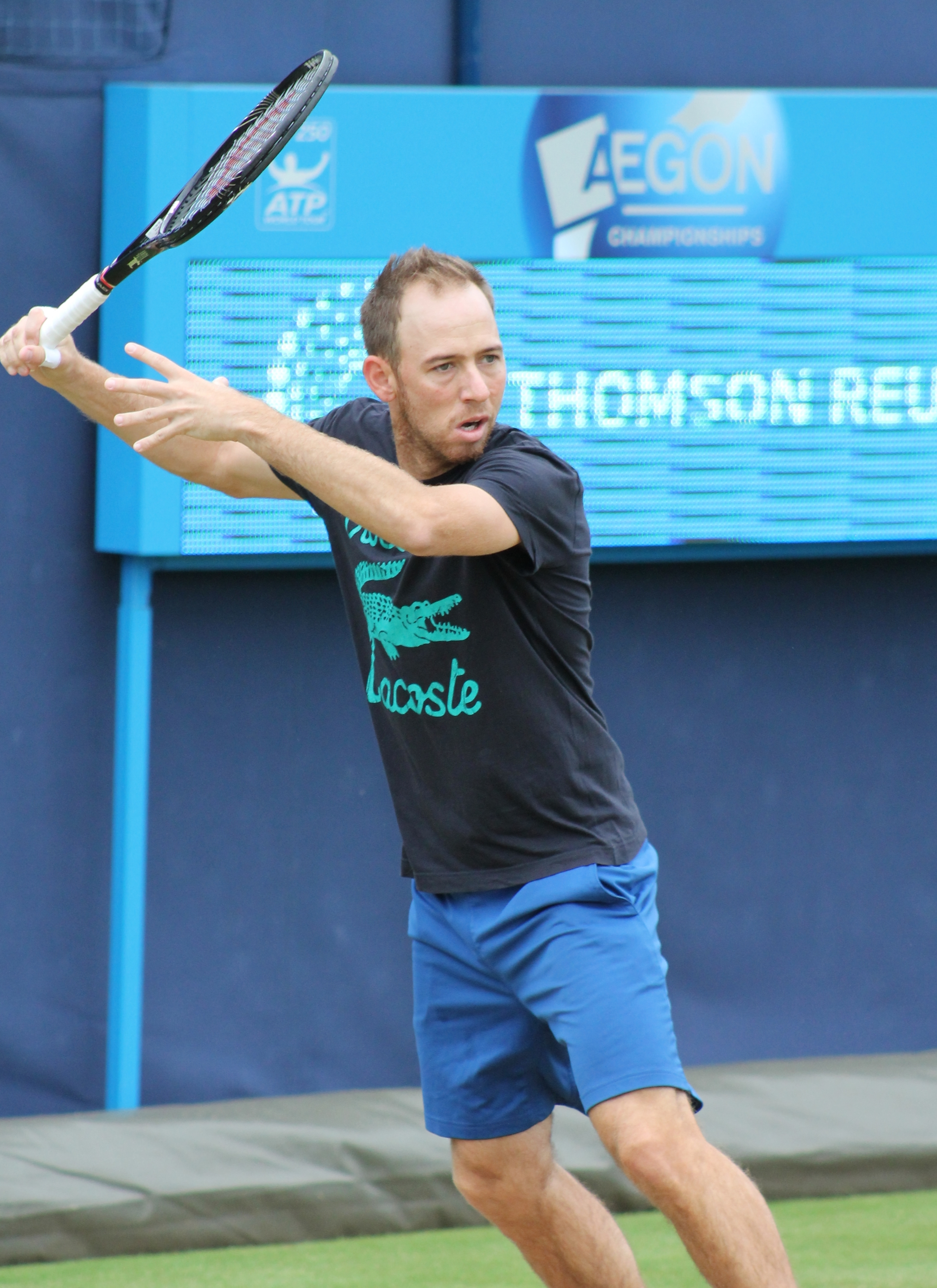
Dudi Sela at Queen's Club 2013

Israel entered one male tennis player into the Olympic tournament. Dudi Sela (world no. 65) qualified directly to the event as one of the top 56 eligible players in the ATP World Rankings as of 6 June 2016, making him the first Israeli to compete in the men's singles tournament since 1992, when Gilad Bloom lost his second round match to Jim Courier of the United States. In the round of 64, Sela won both sets 6–4 against Damir Džumhur from Bosnia. During the hour and a half match, there was a five-minute stoppage when Dzumhur claimed fans were cursing at him from the crowd. Sela failed to advance following the round of 32 after being beaten by David Goffin (ranked 13th in the world) from Belgium 3–6 in both sets.

Athlete	Event	Round of 64	Round of 32	Round of 16	Quarterfinals	Semifinals	Final / BM	
Athlete	Event	Opposition Score	Opposition Score	Opposition Score	Opposition Score	Opposition Score	Opposition Score	Rank
Dudi Sela	Men's singles	Džumhur (BIH); W 6–4, 6–4	Goffin (BEL); L 3–6, 3–6	did not advance				

== Triathlon ==
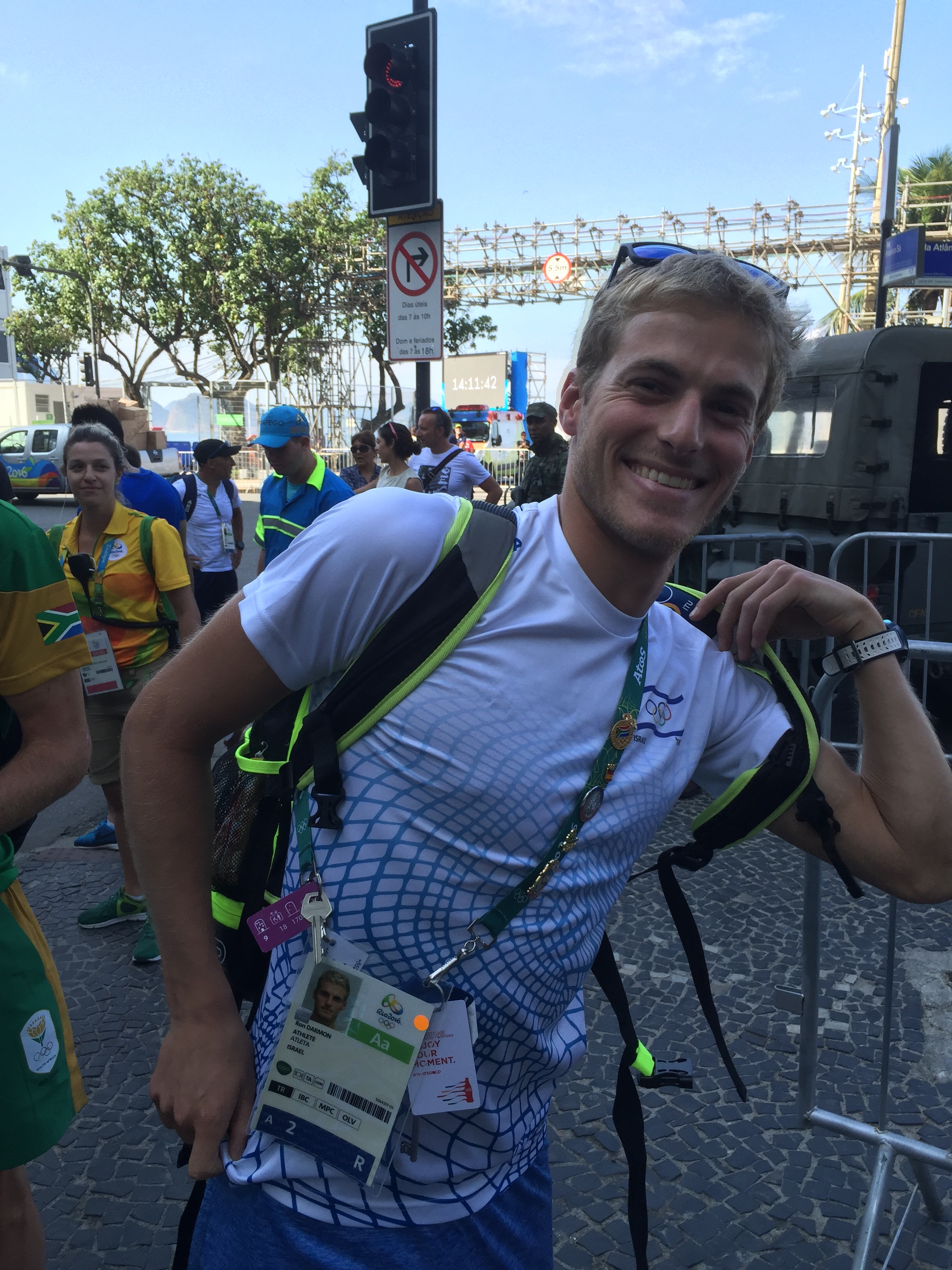
Ron Darmon preparing before the race in the 2016 Summer Olympics

Israel entered one triathlete to compete at the Games, signifying the nation's Olympic debut in the sport. Ron Darmon was ranked among the top 43 eligible triathletes in the men's event based on the ITU Olympic Qualification List as of 15 May 2016. On the topic of being the first Israeli triathlete at the Olympics, he said "Records can be broken but being the first one, that can never be taken away. I'm pretty happy about that." He also said that he did not expect to qualify for Rio, and that he expected his first Olympic qualification to be for Tokyo. Darmon trains in Australia with coach Warwick Dalziel. He received surgery for a broken collarbone in 2015 and had to train to get back in Olympic form. He placed 26th out of 55 participants, with a total time of 1:48.41, 3:40 behind the winner. His best portion of the race was the cycling section, where he had the 16th best time.

Athlete	Event	Swim (1.5 km)	Trans 1	Bike (40 km)	Trans 2	Run (10 km)	Total Time	Rank
Ron Darmon	Men's	18:06	0:47	55:48	0:39	33:21	1:48:41	26

== Weightlifting ==
Israel received a quota place from IWF to send a male weightlifter to the Olympics, signifying the nation's return to the sport for the first time since 1996. Olshanetskyi successfully cleared his first two snatches at 160 kilograms (350 lb) and 165 kilograms (364 lb), but scratched his third attempt of 170 kilograms (370 lb). In the clean and jerk, he cleared his first attempt of 200 kilograms (440 lb). Olshanetskyi scratched his second attempt of 206 kilograms (454 lb) and successfully cleared his third attempt of 207 kilograms (456 lb). This gave him a total score of 372 and 17th place out of 23.

Athlete	Event	Snatch		Clean & Jerk		Total	Rank
Athlete	Event	Result	Rank	Result	Rank	Total	Rank
Igor Olshanetskyi	Men's +105 kg	165	21	207	17	372	17

== Wrestling ==
Israel qualified one wrestler for the women's freestyle 69 kg into the Olympic competition as a result of her semifinal triumph at the first meet of the World Qualification Tournament, signifying the nation's Olympic comeback to the sport for the first time since 2004. Kratysh was the first female Israeli to compete in wrestling at the Olympics. She was ranked fifth in the world when she lost to Oliveira six to two. Kratysh said that, "the opponent smeared herself with oil and I couldn't control the holds." If Oliveira won her semifinal match, Kratysh could have competed for the bronze medal; however Oliveira lost in the quarterfinals to Enas Mostafa

Key:

- VT (ranking points: 5–0 or 0–5) – Victory by fall.
- VB (ranking points: 5–0 or 0–5) – Victory by injury (VF for forfeit, VA for withdrawal or disqualification)
- PP (ranking points: 3–1 or 1–3) – Decision by points – the loser with technical points.
- PO (ranking points: 3–0 or 0–3) – Decision by points – the loser without technical points.
- ST (ranking points: 4–0 or 0–4) – Great superiority – the loser without technical points and a margin of victory of at least 8 (Greco-Roman) or 10 (freestyle) points.
- SP (ranking points: 4–1 or 1–4) – Technical superiority – the loser with technical points and a margin of victory of at least 8 (Greco-Roman) or 10 (freestyle) points.

Women's freestyle

Athlete	Event	Round of 32	Round of 16	Quarterfinal	Semifinal	Repechage 1	Repechage 2	Final / BM	
Athlete	Event	Opposition Result	Opposition Result	Opposition Result	Opposition Result	Opposition Result	Opposition Result	Opposition Result	Rank
Ilana Kratysh	−69 kg	Bye	Oliveira (BRA); L 2–6 ^{PP}	did not advance					13

== Controversy ==
Prior to the Olympics, Facebook allowed users to add the Olympic logo and the team flag to their profile pictures, however Israel was not included on this list. The flag was later added to the list, however was not listed alphabetically, and was included at the end of the list.

Prior to the opening ceremony, the Lebanese delegation was assigned to ride on the same bus as the Israeli delegation. The head of the Lebanese team, Salim al-Haj Nicolas, admitted that he demanded that the bus door be closed on the Israeli team, and that the Lebanese demanded that the Israeli athletes not board the bus. Lebanon and Israel have no diplomatic relations. Udi Gal, an Israeli Olympic sailor, said his team ultimately decided to travel separately to avoid an "international and physical incident" but added "How could they let this happen on the eve of the Olympic Games? Isn't this the opposite of what the Olympics represents?"

On 3 August 2016, two days before the start of the Olympics, the International Olympic Committee officially honored the 11 Israelis murdered during the Munich massacre for the first time.

A Saudi Arabian judoka, Joud Fahmy, was accused of forfeiting her match in order to avoid competing against Gili Cohen. Fahmy, Saudi Arabia's news agency Al Arabiya, and the Saudi Olympic delegation have both stated that Fahmy forfeited because she received an injury. However, other media outlets such as Israel Channel 2 reported she was not injured.

Egyptian judoka Islam El Shehaby refused to shake hands with Israeli Or Sasson or to perform the traditional post-match bow (giving only a quick nod), after Sasson defeated El Shehaby in a first-round match in the heaviest weight class on 12 August. During the Games, social media users pressured Shehaby not to arrive to the match because "it would shame Islam." American coach Jimmy Pedro called the Egyptian's behavior "completely dishonorable and totally unsportsmanlike." El Shehaby was sent home early by the IOC and Egypt's Olympic committee for refusing to shake Sasson's hand.

== See also ==
- Israel at the 2016 Summer Paralympics
