= Udi Gal =

Israeli sailor

Udi Gal אודי גל
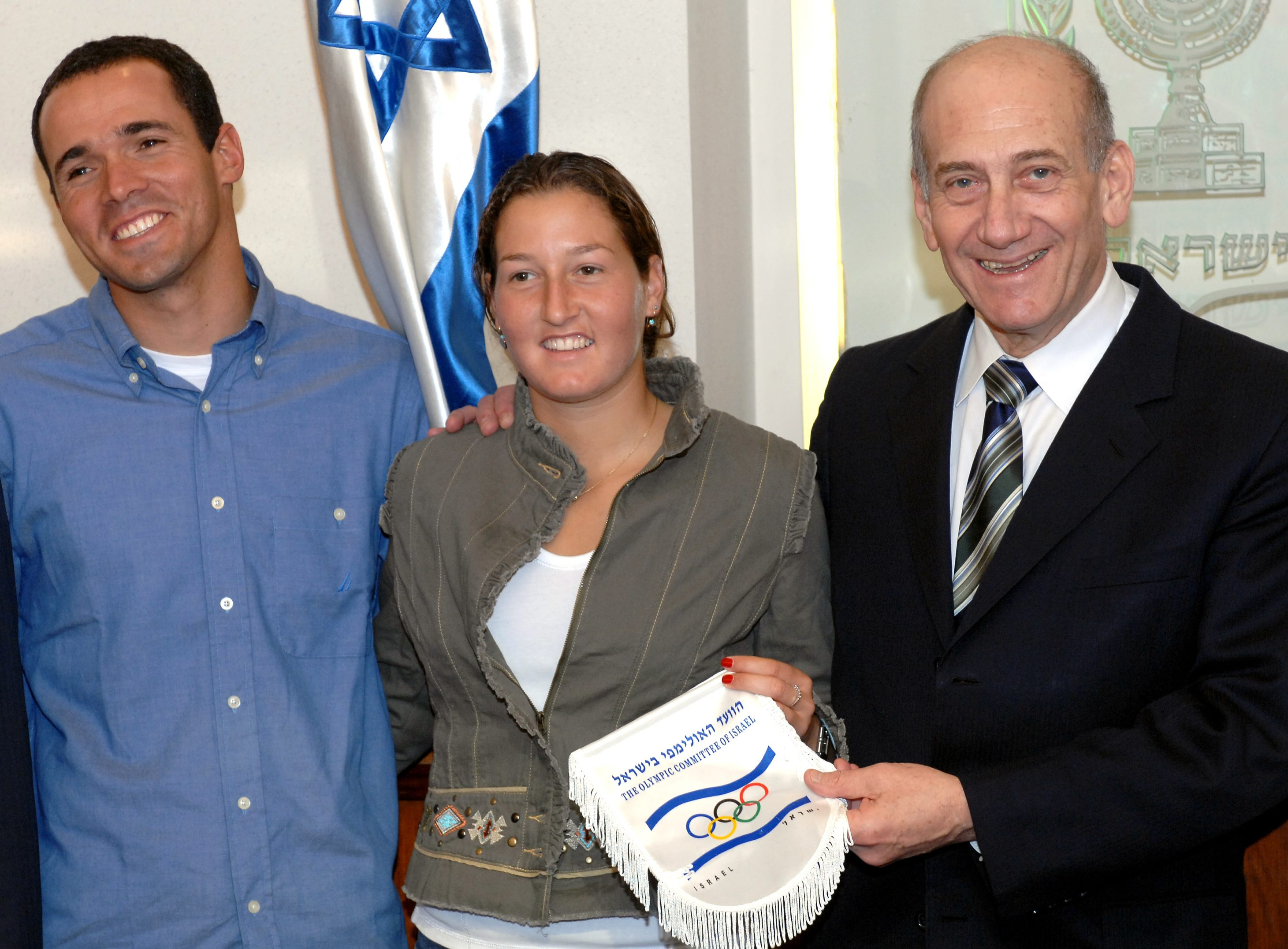
- Gal in 2007

Personal information
- Nationality: Israeli
- Born: June 11, 1979 (age 47) Tel Aviv, Israel
- Height: 6 ft 2 in (188 cm)
- Weight: 161 lb (73 kg)

Sailing career
- Sport: Sailing
- Coached by: Ilan Tashtash
- Class: Men's 470-Class Two-Person Dinghy
Medal record
Men's sailing
Representing Israel
470 World Championships
Bronze medal – third place	2006 Rizhao	Men's 470
Bronze medal – third place	2007 Cascais	Men's 470
Bronze medal – third place	2008 Mordialloc	Men's 470

Udi Gal (Hebrew: אודי גל; born June 11, 1979) is an Israeli Olympic sailor, who is a sailing world championship three-time bronze medalist.

== Biography ==
Gal is Jewish, and was born in Tel Aviv, Israel. He started sailing at 8 years of age, and started racing at 13 years of age. He competes with the club Hapoel Tel Aviv. He competed with partner Gideon Kliger in two-man competitions from the outset of his career, through 2009.

The first event he won was the Youth Europeans 420, in 1996. In 1998 he and Kliger won the European Youth Championships, and in 2001 they finished second in the European Championship in Ireland.

In 2004 he was chosen as chair of the Israel Olympic Committee's athletes section.

He and Kliger won bronze medals in the Sailing 470 World Championship for three straight years in Men's 470-Class Two-Person Dinghy — in 2006–08. In June 2007, he came in third in the Men's 470 ISAF Sailing World Championships, in Cascais, Portugal. In January 2008, he came in third in the Men 470 World Championships, in Melbourne, Australia. In April 2008, he and Kliger were ranked third in the world in the 470 class dinghy.

Gal and Kliger competed on behalf of Israel at the 2004 Summer Olympics in the Sailing at the 2004 Summer Olympics in Athens, Greece, and on behalf of Israel at the 2008 Summer Olympics in Sailing at the 2008 Summer Olympics in Beijing, China, in Men's 470-Class Two-Person Dinghy, coming in 15th and 14th, respectively.

He coaches Israeli Olympians Eyal Levin and Dan Froyliche, who are competing on behalf of Israel at the 2016 Summer Olympics, in the 470.

Gal moved to the San Francisco/Bay Area to pursue a master's degree in Sports Psychology from John F. Kennedy University, and began coaching youth sailing at Peninsula Youth Sailing Foundation (PYSF). In 2021, Gal left PYSF to start his own youth sailing program, High Performance Center (HPC)

As a coach at the 2021 i420 world championships, he helped lead team USA to three gold medals.

== See also ==
- List of European Championships medalists in sailing
