= Dan Froyliche =

Israeli sailor (born 1992)

Personal information
- Native name: דן פרויליך
- Born: November 18, 1992 (age 33) Gan Hashomron, Israel
- Height: 1.82 m (6 ft 0 in)
- Weight: 73 kg (161 lb)

Sport
- Country: Israel
- Sport: Sailing
- Event: 470
- Club: Sdot Yam Yacht Club
- Coached by: Udi Gal and Amnon Samogora

Dan Froyliche (Hebrew: דן פרויליך; born November 18, 1992) is an Israeli Olympic sailor. He sails with Eyal Levin.

== Early life ==
Froyliche was born and lives in Gan Hashomron, Israel, as small coastal town on the Mediterranean Sea between Tel Aviv and Haifa.

== Sailing career ==
Froyliche started sailing and racing at the age of nine, and his first boat was an Optimist single-handed dinghy. His sailing club is Sdot Yam Yacht Club, in Kibbutz Sdot Yam, Israel. The main class that he originally sailed in was the 420 4.2-metres-long double-handed dinghy, and now the main class that he sails in is the 470 4.7-metres-long double-handed dinghy. He sails as the crew.

In 2009 he and Yoav Levi came in second in the 420 Junior Europeans. In 2010, they won the gold medal at the 420 Junior European Championship. In 2011, they switched to the 470, and came in 18th at the 470 Junior World Championships.

In 2013 Froyliche, sailing with Gal Cohen, won the bronze medal at the U21 470 World Championships, their first medal match ever, and the gold medal in the U21 470 European Championships. In 2014 they placed 7th in the South African Championship, 30th in the 470 European Championships, and 31st in the 470 World Championships.

In 2015, Froyliche began to compete with Eyal Levin. They placed 9th at the 470 M World Cup in June 2015, 23rd in the European Championships, and 24th in the 2015 World Championships in Haifa, earning a place as part of Team Israel at the 2016 Summer Olympics.

In 2016, they placed 12th in the Princess Sofia Trophy Regatta, and 26th in the World Championships.

They represented Israel at the 2016 Summer Olympics in sailing in the Men's 470. They finished in 21st place.
