= Sailing at the Summer Paralympics =

- Governing body: WS
- Events: 3 (mixed)

Games
- 1960; 1964; 1968; 1972; 1976; 1980; 1984; 1988; 1992; 1996; 2000; 2004; 2008; 2012; 2016; 2020; 2024
- Note: demonstration sport years indicated in italics
- Medalists

Sailing was an official part of the Summer Paralympic Games between 2000 and 2016, after being a demonstration sport in 1996. The International Association for Disabled Sailing was responsible for coordinating the event with the International Paralympic Committee and the hosts.

== Paralympic Classes and Disciplines ==
Discipline	Class	Gender	1996	2000	2004	2008	2012	2016
One Person Keelboat	2.4 m	Open	-	X	X	-	-	-
One Person Keelboat	2.4 One Design (Norlin Mk3)	Open	-	-	-	X	X	X
Two Person Keelboat	SKUD 18	Female + (Male or Female)	-	-	-	X	X	X
Three Person Keelboat	Sonar	Open 3 Person	-	X	X	X	X	X
Three Person Keelboat	Sonar	Open 3 Person + Reserve	Demonstration Event	-	-	-	-	-

== Medal tables ==
Overall Medal Total by Nation
Rank	Nation	Gold	Silver	Bronze	Total
1	Australia	4	2	1	7
2	Germany	2	3	0	5
3	France	2	2	0	4
4	Great Britain	2	0	3	5
5	United States	1	3	4	8
6	Canada	1	2	3	6
7	Netherlands	1	1	2	4
8	Israel	1	0	0	1
9	Denmark	0	1	0	1
10	Norway	0	0	1	1
Totals (10 entries)		14	14	14	42

== Paralympic sailing venues ==
Edition	Year	Host	City	Sailing venue	Opening	Closing	View	Classes
10	1996	United States	Atlanta					All
11	2000	Australia	Sydney	Sydney				All
12	2004	Greece	Athens	Athens	Sept			All
13	2008	China	Beijing	Qingdao				All
14	2012	Great Britain	London	Weymouth and Portland		AUG		All
15	2016	Brazil	Rio de Janeiro	Rio de Janeiro				All

== Statistics ==
Nation	60	64	68	72	76	80	84	88	92	96	00	04	08	12	16	20	24	Total
Argentina (ARG)											1			1	1			3
Armenia (ARM)										4	3	3						10
Australia (AUS)											4	4	6	6	6			26
Austria (AUT)													3	3	1			7
Brazil (BRA)													3	2	6			11
Canada (CAN)										4	4	4	6	6	6			30
China (CHN)													6					6
Czech Republic (CZE)															1			1
Denmark (DEN)											1	1	1	1				4
Spain (ESP)										4	4	4	1	3	6			22
Estonia (EST)											1	1						2
Finland (FIN)										4	1	1	1	1	1			9
France (FRA)											1	1	4	4	4			14
Great Britain (GBR)										4	4	4	6	6	6			30
Germany (GER)										4	4	4	4	4	4			24
Greece (GRE)													4	4	3			11
Hungary (HUN)													1					1
Ireland (IRL)										4	3	3	5	3	3			21
Israel (ISR)											3	3	3	5	5			19
Italy (ITA)											1	1	4	6	6			18
Japan (JPN)										4	4	4		3				15
Malaysia (MAS)													2	2	1			5
Netherlands (NED)										4	3	3	1	4	2			17
Norway (NOR)										4	4	4	4	4	4			24
New Zealand (NZL)										4	4	4		3	3			18
Philippines (PHI)													2					2
Poland (POL)										3					2			5
Portugal (POR)													2					2
Puerto Rico (PUR)													1	1				2
South Africa (RSA)											1	1						2
Singapore (SIN)													2	2	2			6
Switzerland (SUI)										4	3	3						10
Sweden (SWE)										4	4	4	2		1			15
United States (USA)										4	4	4	6	6	6			30
Events										1	2	2	3	3	3	-	14	
Boats										15	32	31	41	41	41	-	201	
2.4m - Male										-	17	16	15	15	15	-	78	
2.4m - Female										-	0	0	1	1	1	-	3	
Skud 18 - Male										-	-	-	11	11	11	-	33	
Skud 18 - Female										-	-	-	11	11	11	-	33	
Sonar - Male										59	44	45	41	39	40	-	268	
Sonar - Female										0	1	0	1	3	2	-	7	
Sailors - Male										59	61	61	67	65	66	-	379	
Sailors - Female										0	1	0	13	15	14	-	43	
Sailors - Total										59	62	61	80	80	80	-	422	
First Time Competitors										59	50	37	49	33	31	-	259	
Nations										15	22	21	25	23	23	-	129	
Nations - First Time										15	8	0	10	0	1	-	34	
										96	00	04	08	12	16			

== Medalist ==
=== Multiple Medalists ===
Position	Sailor	Country	Period	Gold	Silver	Bronze	Total	Classes
1	Damien Seguin	France (FRA)	2004 - 2016	2	1	0	3	2.4 Metre
1	Daniel Fitzgibbon	Australia (AUS)	2008 - 2016	2	1	0	3	SKUD 18
3	Liesl Tesch	Australia (AUS)	2012 - 2016	2	0 (2)	0 (1)	2 (5)	SKUD 18
4	Jens Kroker	Germany (GER)	2000 - 2016	1	2	0	3	Sonar
5	Heiko Kroeger	Germany (GER)	2000 - 2016	1	1	0	2	2.4 Metre
5	Siegmund Mainka	Germany (GER)	2008 - 2016	1	1	0	2	Sonar
5	Marcel Van De Veen	Netherlands (NED)	2004 - 2012	1	1	0	2	Sonar
5	Mischa Rossen	Netherlands (NED)	2000 - 2012	1	1	0	2	Sonar
5	Robert Prem	Germany (GER)	2008 - 2012	1	1	0	2	Sonar
5	Udo Hessels	Netherlands (NED)	1996 - 2012	1	1	0	2	Sonar
11	Paul Tingley	Canada	2000 - 2016	1	0	2	3	2.4 Metre Sonar
12	Colin Harrison	Australia (AUS)	2004 - 2016	1	0	1	2	Sonar
12	Graeme Martin	Australia (AUS)	2000 - 2008	1	0	1	2	Sonar
12	Helena Lucas	Great Britain (GBR)	2008 - 2016	1	0	1	2	2.4 Metre
12	Russell Boaden	Australia (AUS)	2008 - 2016	1	0	1	2	Sonar
28	John McRoberts	Canada (CAN)	1996 - 2016	0	2	1	3	SKUD 18
29	Jean-Paul Creignou	United States (USA)	2004 - 2012	0	1	1	2	Sonar
29	Thomas Brown	United States (USA)	2000 - 2012	0	1	1	2	2.4 Metre
48	Alexandra Rickham	Great Britain (GBR)	2008 - 2016	0	0	2	2	SKUD 18
48	John Ross-Duggan	United States (USA)	1996 - 2004	0	0	2	2	Sonar
48	Niki Birrell	Great Britain (GBR)	2008 - 2016	0	0	2	2	SKUD 18
48	Thierry Schmitter	Netherlands (NED)	2004 - 2012	0	0	2	2	2.4 Metre

=== 2.4m / Norlin Mk3 Medalists ===
Year	Gold	Silver	Bronze
2000 Sydney	Heiko Kroeger (GER)	Jens Als Andersen (DEN)	Thomas Brown (USA)
2004 Athens	Damien Seguin (FRA)	Thomas Brown (USA)	Thierry Schmitter (NED)
2008 Beijing	Paul Tingley (CAN)	Damien Seguin (FRA)	John Ruf (USA)
2012 London	Helena Lucas (GBR)	Heiko Kroeger (GER)	Thierry Schmitter (NED)
2016 Rio de Janeiro	Damien Seguin (FRA)	Matthew Bugg (AUS)	Helena Lucas (GBR)

=== SKUD 18 Medalists ===
Year	Gold	Silver	Bronze
2008 Beijing	Nick Scandone and Maureen McKinnon-Tucker (USA)	Dan Fitzgibbon and Rachael Cox (AUS)	John McRoberts and Stacie Louttit (CAN)
2012 London	Dan Fitzgibbon and Liesl Tesch (AUS)	Jean-Paul Creignou and Jennifer French (USA)	Alexandra Rickham and Niki Birrell (GBR)
2016 Rio de Janeiro	Daniel Fitzgibbon; Liesl Tesch (AUS)	John McRoberts; Jackie Gay (CAN)	Alexandra Rickham; Niki Birrell (GBR)

=== Sonar Medalists ===
Year	Gold	Silver	Bronze
1996 Atlanta	Great Britain; Andy Cassell; Kevin Curtis; Tony Downs; Ian Harrison	Canada; Kirk Westergaard; John Mcroberts; Ken Kelly; David Cook	Germany; Waldo Esparza; James Leatherman; Chris Murphy; John Ross-Duggan
2000 Sydney	Australia; Noel Robins; Jamie Dunross; Graeme Martin	Germany; Jens Kroker; Peter Muenter; Peter Reichl	Canada; Davis Williams; Paul Tingley; Brian MacDonald
2004 Athens	Israel; Dror Cohen; Arnon Efrati; Benni Vexler	Netherlands; Udo Hessels; Marcel van de Veen; Mischa Rossen	United States; John Ross-Dugan; Jean Paul Creignou; Bradley Johnson
2008 Beijing	Germany; Jens Kroker; Siegmund Mainka; Robert Prem	France; Bruno Jourdren; Eric Flageul; Nicolas Vimont-Vicary	Australia; Colin Harrison; Russel Boaden; Rodney Angwin
2012 London	Netherlands; Udo Hessels; Marcel van de Veen; Mischa Rossen	Germany; Jens Kroker; Siegmund Mainka; Robert Prem	Norway; Aleksander Wang-Hansen; Marie Solberg; Per Eugen Kristiansen
2016 Rio de Janeiro	Australia; Colin Harrison; Russell Boaden; Jonathan Harris	United States; Alphonsus Doerr; Hugh Freund; Bradley Kendell	Canada; Paul Tingley; Logan Campbell; Scott Lutes
