= List of Sonar (keelboat) championships =

This is a list of Sonar sailboat championships.

== Disabled World Championships ==
The Sonar has also been used extensively for disabled sailing. The boat specifications are exactly the same for open and disabled sailing events, but additional adaptations are allowed to be fitted to the boat to aid the crew who are not permitted to hike or use a spinnaker. The World Championships is recognised by World Sailing.

Sonar Para World Championship medallists
Year	Gold	Silver	Bronze	Ref.
1999 Cadiz	Germany; Jens Kroker; Peter Muenter; Peter Reichl	Great Britain; Andy Cassell; Andrew Millband; Brian Harding	Netherlands; Udo Hessels; Marcel van de Veen; Mischa Rossen	
2001 Florida	Canada; Brian Mackie; Brian MacDonald; Paul Tingley	Great Britain; Andy Cassell; Brian Harding; Edward Suckling	Germany; Jens Kroker; Dietmar Steigel; Peter Reichl	
2002 Medemblik	Germany; Jens Kroker; Dietmar Steigel; Peter Reichl	Great Britain; Andy Cassell; Brian Harding; Edward Suckling	Canada; Brian Mackie; Brian MacDonald; Paul Tingley	
2003 Athens	Netherlands; Udo Hessels; Marcel van de Veen; Mischa Rossen	Israel; Dror Cohen; Benny Vexler; Michael Levy	Great Britain; John Robertson; Stephen Thomas; Hannah Stodel	
2005 Sonderborg	Great Britain; John Robertson; Stephen Thomas; Hannah Stodel	Norway; Jostein Stordahl; Aleksander Wang-Hansen; Per Eugen Kristiansen	Germany; Jens Kroker; Holger Schonenberg; Tobias Schuetz	
2006 Perth	Great Britain; John Robertson; Stephen Thomas; Hannah Stodel	Germany; Jens Kroker; Sigi Mainka; Tobias Schuetz	Norway; Jostein Stordahl; Aleksander Wang-Hansen; Per Eugen Kristiansen	
2007 Rochester	United States; Rick Doerr; Tim Angle; Bill Donahue	United States; Paul Callahan; Tom Brown; Roger Cleworth	Germany; Jens Kroker; Tobias Schuetz; Sigi Mainka	
2009 Athens	Germany; Jens Kroker; Robert Prem; Siggy Mainka	Israel; Dror Cohen; Arnon Efrati; Benny Vexler	Greece; Christoforou Vasilis; Notaroglou Argiris; Aleksas Thodoris	
2010 Medemblik	Netherlands; Udo Hessels; Marcel van de Veen; Mischa Rossen	Great Britain; John Robertson; Hannah Stodel; Stephen Thomas	Germany; Jens Kroker; Robert Prem; Siegmund Mainka	
2011 Weymouth	Israel; Dror Cohen; Benny Vexler; Arnon Efrati	Great Britain; John Robertson; Hannah Stodel; Stephen Thomas	Norway; Aleksander Wang-Hansen; Per Eugen Kristiansen; Marie Solberg	
2012 Charlotte Harbor	Norway; Aleksander Wang-Hansen; Per Eugen Kristiansen; Marie Solberg	France; Bruno Jourdren; Eric Flageul; Nicolas Vimont-Vicary	Great Britain; John Robertson; Hannah Stodel; Stephen Thomas	
2013 Kinsale; Ireland	France; Bruno Jourdren; Eric Flageul; Nicolas Vimont-Vicary	Netherlands; Udo Hessels; Marcel van de Veen; Mischa Rossen	Australia; Colin Harrison; Jonathan Harris; Russell Boaden	
2014 Halifax	France; Bruno Jourdren; Eric Flageul; Nicolas Vimont-Vicary	Canada; Paul Tingley; Logan Campbell; Scott Lutes	Australia; Colin Harrison; Jonathan Harris; Russell Boaden	Canada
2015 Melbourne; Australia	Great Britain; John Robertson; Hannah Stodel; Stephen Thomas	Australia; Colin Harrison; Jonathan Harris; Russell Boaden	Norway; Aleksander Wang-Hansen; Per Eugen Kristiansen; Marie Solberg	

== Paralympics ==
The Sonar has been the equipment used for the three person keelboat discipline at all Paralympic Sailing Competitions that have included sailing.

Year	Gold	Silver	Bronze	Ref.
1996 Atlanta; Lake Lanier	Great Britain; Andy Cassell; Kevin Curtis; Tony Downs; Ian Harrison	Canada; Kirk Westergaard; John Mcroberts; Ken Kelly; David Cook	Germany; Waldo Esparza; James Leatherman; Chris Murphy; John Ross-Duggan	
2000 Sydney	Australia; Noel Robins; Jamie Dunross; Graeme Martin	Germany; Jens Kroker; Peter Muenter; Peter Reichl	Canada; Davis Williams; Paul Tingley; Brian MacDonald	
2004 Athens	Israel; Dror Cohen; Arnon Efrati; Benni Vexler	Netherlands; Udo Hessels; Marcel van de Veen; Mischa Rossen	United States; John Ross-Dugan; Jean Paul Creignou; Bradley Johnson	
2008 Beijing; Qingdoa	Germany; Jens Kroker; Siegmund Mainka; Robert Prem	France; Bruno Jourdren; Eric Flageul; Nicolas Vimont-Vicary	Australia; Colin Harrison; Russel Boaden; Rodney Angwin	
2012 London; Weymouth	Netherlands; Udo Hessels; Marcel van de Veen; Mischa Rossen	Germany; Jens Kroker; Siegmund Mainka; Robert Prem	Norway; Aleksander Wang-Hansen; Marie Solberg; Per Eugen Kristiansen	
2016 Rio	Australia; Colin Harrison; Russell Boaden; Jonathan Harris	United States; Alphonsus Doerr; Hugh Freund; Bradley Kendell	Canada; Paul Tingley; Logan Campbell; Scott Lutes	
