= Para World Sailing Championships =

The Para World Sailing Championships is an annual World Championship multi-class sailing regatta in para classes organised by the World Sailing.

== Editions ==
Event			Host			Competitors			Ref.
Ed.	Date	Year	Club	Location	Nats	Events	Athletes	Nations	Ref.
	31 August – 4 September	1999		Cádiz	Spain				
	24–31 October	2001		St. Petersburg	United States				
	22–27 September	2002		Medemblik	Netherlands				
	29 August – 5 September	2005		Sønderborg	Denmark				
	16–26 January	2006	Royal Perth Yacht Club	Perth	Australia				
	7–15 September	2007		Rochester	United States				
	11–18 October	2009		Phalerum	Greece				
	6–14 July	2010		Medemblik	Netherlands				
	1–8 July	2011	Weymouth and Portland National Sailing Academy	Weymouth	United Kingdom				
	7–15 January	2012	Charlotte Harbor Regatta, Inc	Charlotte Harbor	United States				
	22–30 August	2013	Kinsale Yacht Club	Kinsale	Ireland				
	16–24 August	2014		Halifax	Canada				
	24 November – 3 December	2015		Melbourne	Australia	3			
	21–28 May	2016		Medemblik	Netherlands	3			
	20–25 June	2017		Kiel	Germany	3			
	September 16-22	2018	Sheboygan Yacht Club	Sheboygan	United States				
		2019	Club Nautico Puerto Sherry	Kiel	Spain				
		2021							
		2023		Hague	Denmark				

== Medalists ==
=== 2.4 Metre ===
Year	Gold	Silver	Bronze	Ref.
1999 Cádiz	Heiko Kröger (GER)	Jens Als Andersen (DEN)	Phillippe Balle (FRA)	
2000	not held because of the 2000 Summer Paralympics			
2001 St. Petersburg	Heiko Kröger (GER)	Thomas Brown (USA)	Bjørnar Erikstad (NOR)	
2002 Medemblik	Heiko Kröger (GER)	Damien Seguin (FRA)	Thomas Brown (USA)	
2003 Athens	Heiko Kröger (GER)	Damien Seguin (FRA)	Thierry Schmitter (NED)	
2004	not held because of the 2004 Summer Paralympics			
2005 Sønderborg	Damien Seguin (FRA)	Heiko Kröger (GER)	Thierry Schmitter (NED)	
2006 Perth	Heiko Kröger (GER)	Helena Lucas (GBR)	Bjørnar Erikstad (NOR)	
2007 Rochester	Damien Seguin (FRA)	Heiko Kröger (GER)	Thierry Schmitter (NED)	
2008	not held because of the 2008 Summer Paralympics			
2009 Athens	Thierry Schmitter (NED)	Heiko Kröger (GER)	Helena Lucas (GBR)	
2010 Medemblik	Thierry Schmitter (NED)	Heiko Kröger (GER)	Megan Pascoe (GBR)	
2011 Weymouth	Thierry Schmitter (NED)	André Rademaker (NED)	Helena Lucas (GBR)	
2012 Charlotte Harbor	Damien Seguin (FRA)	Thierry Schmitter (NED)	Paul Tingley (CAN)	
2013 Kinsale	Guus Bijlard (NED)	Heiko Kröger (GER)	Damien Seguin (FRA)	
2014 Nova Scotia	Heiko Kröger (GER)	Helena Lucas (GBR)	Damien Seguin (FRA)	
2015 Melbourne	Damien Seguin (FRA)	Heiko Kröger (GER)	Matthew Bugg (AUS)	
2016 Medemblik	Heiko Kröger (GER)	Damien Seguin (FRA)	Matthew Bugg (AUS)	
2017 Kiel	Heiko Kröger (GER)	Matthew Bugg (AUS)	Damien Seguin (FRA)	
2018 Sheboygan	Matthew Bugg (AUS)	Damien Seguin (FRA)	Dee Smith (USA)	
2019 Cádiz	Damien Seguin (FRA)	Antonio Squizzato (ITA)	Bjørnar Erikstad (NOR)	
2021 Warnemünde	Heiko Kröger (GER)	Antonio Squizzato (ITA)	Fia Fjelddahl (SWE)	

=== SKUD 18 ===
Event	Gold	Silver	Bronze
2007 Rochester	Karen Mitchell (USA); JP Creignou (USA)	Nick Scandone (USA); Maureen McKinnon-Tucker (USA)	Carl-Gustaf Fresk (SWE); Annika Lindgren (SWE)
2008 Changi	Jovin Tan (SIN); Desiree Lim (SIN)	Jia Hai Liang (CHN); Yu Huawu (CHN)	Bento Amaral (POR); Luisa Silvano (POR)
2010 Medemblik	Alexandra Rickham (GBR); Niki Birrell (GBR)	Scott Whitman (GBR); Julia Dorsett (GBR)	Daniel Fitzgibbon (AUS); Rachael Cox (AUS)
2011 Weymouth and Portland	Alexandra Rickham (GBR); Niki Birrell (GBR)	Jennifer French (USA); Jean-Paul Creignou (USA)	Daniel Fitzgibbon (AUS); Liesl Tesch (AUS)

=== Sonar ===
Sonar Para World Championship medallists
Year	Gold	Silver	Bronze	Ref.
1999 Cádiz	Germany; Jens Kroker; Peter Muenter; Peter Reichl	Great Britain; Andy Cassell; Andrew Millband; Brian Harding	Netherlands; Udo Hessels; Marcel van de Veen; Mischa Rossen	
2001 Florida	Canada; Brian Mackie; Brian MacDonald; Paul Tingley	Great Britain; Andy Cassell; Brian Harding; Edward Suckling	Germany; Jens Kroker; Dietmar Steigel; Peter Reichl	
2002 Medemblik	Germany; Jens Kroker; Dietmar Steigel; Peter Reichl	Great Britain; Andy Cassell; Brian Harding; Edward Suckling	Canada; Brian Mackie; Brian MacDonald; Paul Tingley	
2003 Athens	Netherlands; Udo Hessels; Marcel van de Veen; Mischa Rossen	Israel; Dror Cohen; Benny Vexler; Michael Levy	Great Britain; John Robertson; Stephen Thomas; Hannah Stodel	
2005 Sonderborg	Great Britain; John Robertson; Stephen Thomas; Hannah Stodel	Norway; Jostein Stordahl; Aleksander Wang-Hansen; Per Eugen Kristiansen	Germany; Jens Kroker; Holger Schonenberg; Tobias Schuetz	
2006 Perth	Great Britain; John Robertson; Stephen Thomas; Hannah Stodel	Germany; Jens Kroker; Sigi Mainka; Tobias Schuetz	Norway; Jostein Stordahl; Aleksander Wang-Hansen; Per Eugen Kristiansen	
2007 Rochester	United States; Rick Doerr; Tim Angle; Bill Donahue	United States; Paul Callahan; Tom Brown; Roger Cleworth	Germany; Jens Kroker; Tobias Schuetz; Sigi Mainka	
2009 Athens	Germany; Jens Kroker; Robert Prem; Siggy Mainka	Israel; Dror Cohen; Arnon Efrati; Benny Vexler	Greece; Christoforou Vasilis; Notaroglou Argiris; Aleksas Thodoris	
2010 Medemblik	Netherlands; Udo Hessels; Marcel van de Veen; Mischa Rossen	Great Britain; John Robertson; Hannah Stodel; Stephen Thomas	Germany; Jens Kroker; Robert Prem; Siegmund Mainka	
2011 Weymouth	Israel; Dror Cohen; Benny Vexler; Arnon Efrati	Great Britain; John Robertson; Hannah Stodel; Stephen Thomas	Norway; Aleksander Wang-Hansen; Per Eugen Kristiansen; Marie Solberg	
2012 Charlotte Harbor	Norway; Aleksander Wang-Hansen; Per Eugen Kristiansen; Marie Solberg	France; Bruno Jourdren; Eric Flageul; Nicolas Vimont-Vicary	Great Britain; John Robertson; Hannah Stodel; Stephen Thomas	
2013 Kinsale; Ireland	France; Bruno Jourdren; Eric Flageul; Nicolas Vimont-Vicary	Netherlands; Udo Hessels; Marcel van de Veen; Mischa Rossen	Australia; Colin Harrison; Jonathan Harris; Russell Boaden	
2014 Halifax	France; Bruno Jourdren; Eric Flageul; Nicolas Vimont-Vicary	Canada; Paul Tingley; Logan Campbell; Scott Lutes	Australia; Colin Harrison; Jonathan Harris; Russell Boaden	Canada
2015 Melbourne; Australia	Great Britain; John Robertson; Hannah Stodel; Stephen Thomas	Australia; Colin Harrison; Jonathan Harris; Russell Boaden	Norway; Aleksander Wang-Hansen; Per Eugen Kristiansen; Marie Solberg	

=== Men's Hansa 303 ===
Year	Gold	Silver	Bronze
2017 Kiel	Piotr Cichocki (POL)	Christopher Symonds (AUS)	Jens Kroker (GER)
2023 The Hague	Piotr Cichocki (POL)	Takumi Niwa (JPN)	João Pinto (POR)

=== Women's Hansa 303 ===
Year	Gold	Silver	Bronze
2017 Kiel	Violeta del Reino Diez del Valle (ESP)	Ana Paula Gonçalves Marques (BRA)	Cherrie Pinpin (PHI)
2023 The Hague	Betsy Alison (USA)	Olga Górnaś-Grudzień (POL)	Alison Weatherly (AUS)
