= US Sailing's Miami Olympic Classes Regatta =

- First held: 1990
- Organizer: US Sailing
- Classes: 470, 49er, 49er FX, Finn, Laser, Laser Radial, Nacra 17, RS:X
- Venue: US Sailing Center, Miami, United States
- Website: miami.ussailing.org

US Sailing's Miami Olympic Classes Regatta is an annual sailing regatta at the US Sailing Center in Miami, held since 1990. It hosts the Olympic and Paralympic classes.

It was part of the ISAF Sailing World Cup. It has been part of the US Open Sailing Series since 2021, together with regattas in Ft. Lauderdale and Clearwater.

As of 2023, the biggest edition has been the 2015 event, which included 599 boats, 848 participants in total from 64 countries.

== Winners ==
=== Europe ===
- 1991 – Carolyn Ulander (USA)
- 1992 – Courtenay Dey (USA)
- 1993 – Tine Moberg (CAN)
- 1994 – Tine Moberg-Parker (CAN)
- 1995 – Márcia Pellicano (BRA)
- 1996 – Jenny Armstrong (NZL)
- 1997 – Laura Dunn (USA)
- 1998 – Tine Moberg-Parker (CAN)
- 2000 – Søren Johnsen (DEN)
- 2001 – Meg Galliard (USA)
- 2002 – Meg Galliard (USA)
- 2003 – Lenka Šmídová (CZE)
- 2004 – Lenka Šmídová (CZE)

=== Finn ===
- 1991 – Lawrence Lemieux (CAN)
- 1992 – Brian Ledbetter (USA)
- 1993 – Richard Clarke (CAN)
- 1994 – José van der Ploeg (ESP)
- 1995 – Brian Ledbetter (USA)
- 1996 – Philippe Presti (FRA)
- 1997 – Sébastien Godefroid (BEL)
- 1998 – Lawrence Lemieux (CAN)
- 1999 – Rodrigo Meireles (BRA)
- 2000 – Richard Clarke (CAN)
- 2001 – Lawrence Lemieux (CAN)
- 2002 – Andrew Simpson (GBR)
- 2003 – Jonas Høgh-Christensen (DEN)
- 2004 – Mateusz Kusznierewicz (POL)
- 2005 – Chris Cook (CAN)
- 2006 – Rafael Trujillo (ESP)
- 2007 – Peer Moberg (NOR)
- 2009 – Ed Wright (GBR)
- 2010 – Ed Wright (GBR)
- 2011 – Giles Scott (GBR)
- 2012 – Zach Railey (USA)
- 2013 – Caleb Paine (USA)
- 2014 – Giles Scott (GBR)
- 2015 – Giles Scott (GBR)
- 2016 – Jorge Zarif (BRA)
- 2017 – Jorge Zarif (BRA)
- 2018 – Giles Scott (GBR)
- 2019 – Max Salminen (SWE)
- 2020 – Caleb Paine (USA)
- 2022 – Rodion Mazin (USA)

=== ILCA 6 (formerly known as Laser Radial) ===
- 2000 – Anna Tunnicliffe (USA)
- 2005 – Paige Railey (USA)
- 2006 – Anna Tunnicliffe (USA)
- 2007 – Sari Multala (FIN)
- 2008 – Paige Railey (USA)
- 2009 – Anna Tunnicliffe (USA)
- 2010 – Paige Railey (USA)
- 2011 – Paige Railey (USA)
- 2012 – Xu Lijia (CHN)
- 2013 – Paige Railey (USA)
- 2014 – Paige Railey (USA)
- 2015 – Anne-Marie Rindom (DEN)
- 2016 – Evi Van Acker (BEL)
- 2017 – Vasileia Karachaliou (GRE)
- 2018 – Alison Young (GBR)
- 2019 – Zhang Dongshuang (CHN)
- 2020 – Erika Reineke (USA)

=== ILCA 7 (formerly known as Laser) ===
- 1993 – Jim Brady (USA)
- 1994 – Peter Dreyfuss (USA)
- 1995 – Robert Scheidt (BRA)
- 1996 – Stefan Warkalla (GER)
- 1997 – Antonio Goeters (MEX)
- 1998 – John Myrdal (USA)
- 1999 – Mark Mendelblatt (USA)
- 2000 – Karl Suneson (SWE)
- 2001 – Paul Goodison (GBR)
- 2002 – Paul Goodison (GBR)
- 2003 – Mark Mendelblatt (USA)
- 2004 – Paul Goodison (GBR)
- 2005 – Brad Funk (USA)
- 2006 – Paul Goodison (GBR)
- 2007 – Gustavo Lima (POR)
- 2008 – Maciej Grabowski (POL)
- 2009 – Nick Thompson (GBR)
- 2010 – Nick Thompson (GBR)
- 2011 – Rasmus Myrgren (SWE)
- 2012 – Paul Goodison (GBR)
- 2013 – Jesper Stålheim (SWE)
- 2014 – Tonči Stipanović (CRO)
- 2015 – Philipp Buhl (GER)
- 2016 – Robert Scheidt (BRA)
- 2017 – Jean-Baptiste Bernaz (FRA)
- 2018 – Tom Burton (AUS)
- 2019 – Hermann Tomasgaard (NOR)
- 2020 – Stefano Peschiera (PER)

=== Men’s 470 ===
- 1991 – Morgan Reeser (USA)
- 1992 – Morgan Reeser (USA)
- 1993 – Mike Sturman & Bob Little (USA)
- 1994 – John Merricks & Ian Walker (GBR)
- 1995 – John Merricks & Ian Walker (GBR)
- 1996 – Matteo Ivaldi & Michele Ivaldi (ITA)
- 1997 – Morgan Reeser & Bob Merrick (USA)
- 1998 – Larry Suter & Jonathan Farrar (USA)
- 1999 – Graham Vials & Magnus Leask (GBR)
- 2001 – Kevin Teborek & Talbot Ingram (USA)
- 2002 – Steven Hunt & Michael Miller (USA)
- 2003 – Paul Foerster & Kevin Burnham (USA)
- 2004 – Michael Anderson-Mitterling & Graham Biehl (USA)
- 2005 – Sven Coster & Kalle Coster (NED)
- 2006 – Nic Asher & Elliot Willis (GBR)
- 2007 – Nick Rogers & Joe Glanfield (GBR)
- 2009 – Onán Barreiros & Aarón Sarmiento (ESP)
- 2010 – Anton Dahlberg & Sebastian Östling (SWE)
- 2011 – Nic Asher & Elliot Willis (GBR)
- 2012 – Mathew Belcher & Malcolm Page (AUS)
- 2013 – Stuart McNay & Dave Hughes (USA)
- 2014 – Sofian Bouvet & Jérémie Mion (FRA)
- 2015 – Luke Patience & Elliot Willis (GBR)
- 2016 – Stuart McNay & Dave Hughes (USA)
- 2017 – Stuart McNay & Dave Hughes (USA)
- 2018 – Luke Patience & Chris Grube (GBR)
- 2019 – Jordi Xammar & Nicolás Rodríguez (ESP)
- 2020 – Jordi Xammar & Nicolás Rodríguez (ESP)

=== Women's 470 ===
- 1992 – Kris Stookey (USA)
- 1993 – Allison Jolly & Lynne Shore (USA)
- 1994 – Allison Jolly & Lynne Shore (USA)
- 1995 – Anette Patrunky & Hanne Pilz (GER)
- 1996 – Kris Stookey & Louise Van Voorhis (USA)
- 1997 – Whitney Connor & Elizabeth Kratzig (USA)
- 1998 – Whitney Connor & Elizabeth Kratzig (USA)
- 1999 – Tracy Hayley & Louise Van Voorhis (USA)
- 2001 – Courtenay Dey & Linda Wennerstrom (USA)
- 2002 – Courtenay Dey & Linda Wennerstrom (USA)
- 2003 – Katie McDowell & Isabelle Kinsolving (USA)
- 2004 – Alina Grobe & Vivien Kussatz (GER)
- 2005 – Amanda Clark & Sarah Mergenthaler (USA)
- 2006 – Ingrid Petitjean & Nadège Douroux (FRA)
- 2007 – Marcelien de Koning & Lobke Berkhout (NED)
- 2009 – Henriette Koch & Lene Sommer (DEN)
- 2010 – Amanda Clark & Sarah Chin (USA)
- 2011 – Ingrid Petitjean & Nadège Douroux (FRA)
- 2012 – Lisa Westerhof & Lobke Berkhout (NED)
- 2013 – Fernanda Oliveira & Ana Barbachan (BRA)
- 2014 – Sophie Weguelin & Eilidh McIntyre (GBR)
- 2015 – Jo Aleh & Polly Powrie (NZL)
- 2016 – Chen Shasha & Gao Haiyan (CHN)
- 2017 – Afrodite Zegers & Anneloes van Veen (NED)
- 2018 – Tina Mrak & Veronika Macarol (SLO)
- 2019 – Frederike Loewe & Anna Markfort (GER)
- 2020 – Camille Lecointre & Aloïse Retornaz (FRA)

=== Open/Mixed 470 ===
- 2021 – Stuart McNay & Dave Hughes (USA)
- 2022 – Louisa Nordstrom & Trevor Bornarth (USA)
- 2023 – Stuart McNay & Lara Dallman-Weiss (USA)

=== 29er ===
- 2023 – Tyler Lamm & Andrew Lamm (USA)

=== 49er ===
- 1998 – Marcos Soares & Fabio Matune (BRA)
- 2001 – Andy Mack & Adam Lowry (USA)
- 2002 – Andy Mack & Adam Lowry (USA)
- 2003 – Tim Wadlow & Pete Spaulding (USA)
- 2004 – Tim Wadlow & Pete Spaulding (USA)
- 2005 – Morgan Larson & Pete Spaulding (USA)
- 2006 – Pietro Sibello & Gianfranco Sibello (ITA)
- 2007 – Morgan Larson & Pete Spaulding (USA)
- 2009 – Nico Delle Karth & Nikolaus Resch (AUT)
- 2010 – Emmanuel Dyen & Stéphane Christidis (FRA)
- 2011 – John Pink & Rick Peacock (GBR)
- 2012 – Nico Delle Karth & Nikolaus Resch (AUT)
- 2013 – Fred Strammer & Zach Brown (USA)
- 2014 – Jonas Warrer & Peter Lang (DEN)
- 2015 – Nico Delle Karth & Nikolaus Resch (AUT)
- 2016 – Diego Botín & Iago López (ESP)
- 2017 – Dylan Fletcher-Scott & Stuart Bithell (GBR)
- 2018 – Dylan Fletcher-Scott & Stuart Bithell (GBR)
- 2019 – Erik Heil & Thomas Plößel (GER)
- 2021 – Nevin Snow & Dane Wilson (USA)
- 2022 – Ian Barrows & Hans Henken (USA)
- 2023 – Ian Barrows & Hans Henken (USA)

=== 49er FX ===
- 2013 – Martine Grael & Kahena Kunze (BRA)
- 2014 – Sarah Steyaert & Julie Bossard (FRA)
- 2015 – Alex Maloney & Molly Meech (NZL)
- 2016 – Alex Maloney & Molly Meech (NZL)
- 2017 – Martine Grael & Kahena Kunze (BRA)
- 2018 – Victoria Jurczok & Anika Lorenz (GER)
- 2019 – Martine Grael & Kahena Kunze (BRA)
- 2021 – Stephan Baker & Nicholas Hardy (USA)
- 2022 – Alexandra ten Hove & Mariah Millen (CAN)
- 2023 – Paris Henken & Anna Tunnicliffe (USA)

=== 2.4 Metre ===
- 2002 – Tom Brown (USA)
- 2003 – Heiko Kröger (GER)
- 2004 – Jeff Madrigali (USA)
- 2005 – Stellan Berlin (SWE)
- 2006 – Stellan Berlin (SWE)
- 2007 – Stellan Berlin (SWE)
- 2008 – Damien Seguin (FRA)
- 2009 – Allan Leibel (CAN)
- 2010 – Paul Tingley (CAN)
- 2011 – Damien Seguin (FRA)
- 2012 – Damien Seguin (FRA)
- 2013 – Megan Pascoe (GBR)
- 2014 – Megan Pascoe (GBR)
- 2015 – Bjørnar Erikstad (NOR)
- 2016 – Helena Lucas (GBR)

=== Elliott 6m ===
- 2009 – Lotte Meldgaard Pedersen, Trine Palludan & Tina Schmidt (DEN)
- 2010 – Anna Tunnicliffe, Deborah Capozzi & Molly Vandemoer (USA)
- 2011 – Claire Leroy, Élodie Bertrand & Marie Riou (FRA)
- 2012 – Lucy MacGregor, Annie Lush & Kate MacGregor (GBR)

=== Skud 18 ===
- 2007 – Scott Whitman & Julia Dorsett (USA)
- 2008 – Nick Scandone & Maureen McKinnon-Tucker (USA)
- 2009 – Scott Whitman & Julia Dorsett (USA)
- 2010 – Scott Whitman & Julia Dorsett (USA)
- 2011 – Scott Whitman & Julia Dorsett (USA)
- 2012 – Daniel Fitzgibbon & Liesl Tesch (AUS)
- 2014 – Alexandra Rickham & Niki Birrell (GBR)
- 2015 – Daniel Fitzgibbon & Liesl Tesch (AUS)

=== Soling ===
- 1991 – Dave Curtis (USA)
- 1992 – Gerard Coleman (USA)
- 1994 – Ian Pinnell (GBR)
- 1995 – Magnus Holmberg (SWE)
- 1996 – Herman Horn Johannessen (NOR)
- 1998 – John Kostecki (USA)
- 1999 – Buddy Melges (USA)
- 2000 – Andy Beadsworth (GBR)

=== Sonar ===
- 2002 – Paul Callahan, Keith Burhans & Mike Hagmaier (USA)
- 2003 – John Ross-Duggan, JP Creignou & Mike Ross (USA)
- 2004 – Udo Hessels, Rossen & van de Veen (NED)
- 2005 – John Robertson, Hannah Stodel & Stephen Thomas (GBR)
- 2006 – David Schroeder, Keith Burhans & Bill Mauk (USA)
- 2007 – Dan Parsons, Guy Draper & Tom Pygall (GBR)
- 2008 – Jens Kroker, Siegmund Mainka & Tobias Schuetz (GER)
- 2009 – John Robertson, Hannah Stodel & Aleksander Wang-Hansen (GBR)
- 2010 – Aleksander Wang-Hansen, Per Eugen Kristiansen & Marie Solberg (NOR)
- 2011 – John Robertson, Hannah Stodel & Stephen Thomas (GBR)
- 2012 – Udo Hessels, Mischa Rossen & Marcel van de Veen (NED)
- 2013 – Aleksander Wang-Hansen, Per Eugen Kristiansen & Marie Solberg (NOR)
- 2014 – Bruno Jourdren, Eric Flageul & Nicolas Vimont-Vicary (FRA)
- 2015 – Aleksander Wang-Hansen, Per Eugen Kristiansen & Marie Solberg (NOR)
- 2016 – Paul Tingley, Logan Campbell & Scott Lucas (CAN)

=== Star ===
- 1991 – Mark Reynolds (USA)
- 1992 – Mark Reynolds (USA)
- 1993 – Mark Reynolds & Steve Erickson (USA)
- 1994 – Jim Brady & Steve Erickson (USA)
- 1995 – Peter Bromby & Lee White (BER)
- 1996 – Mark Reynolds & Hal Haenel (USA)
- 1998 – Eric Doyle & Brian Terhaar (USA)
- 1999 – Mark Reynolds & Magnus Liljedahl (USA)
- 2000 – Marc Aurel Pickel & Thomas Auracher (GER)
- 2001 – John MacCausland & Peter Bromby (USA)
- 2002 – Marc Aurel Pickel & David Giles (GER)
- 2003 – Peter Bromby & Lee White (BER)
- 2004 – Mark Reynolds & Steve Erickson (USA)
- 2005 – Andy Horton & Brad Nichol (USA)
- 2006 – Xavier Rohart & Pascal Rambeau (FRA)
- 2007 – Fredrik Lööf & Anders Ekström (SWE)
- 2008 – Xavier Rohart & Pascal Rambeau (FRA)
- 2009 – Rick Merriman & Phil Trinter (USA)
- 2010 – Eivind Melleby & Petter Mørland Pedersen (NOR)
- 2011 – Robert Scheidt & Bruno Prada (BRA)
- 2012 – Robert Scheidt & Bruno Prada (BRA)

=== Yngling ===
- 2002 – Carol Cronin, Kate Fears & Liz Filter (USA)
- 2003 – Sally Barkow, Deborah Capozzi & Carrie Howe (USA)
- 2004 – Sharon Ferris, Kylie Jameson & Joanna White (NZL)
- 2005 – Sally Barkow, Deborah Capozzi & Carrie Howe (USA)
- 2006 – Sally Barkow, Deborah Capozzi & Carrie Howe (USA)
- 2007 – Sally Barkow, Deborah Capozzi & Carrie Howe (USA)
- 2008 – Mandy Mulder, Mary Faber & Merel Witteveen (NED)

=== Nacra 17 ===
- 2013 – Sarah Newberry & John Casey (USA)
- 2014 – Vittorio Bissaro & Silvia Sicouri (ITA)
- 2015 – Vittorio Bissaro & Silvia Sicouri (ITA)
- 2016 – Mandy Mulder & Coen de Koning (NED)
- 2017 – Ben Saxton & Nicola Groves (GBR)
- 2018 – Jason Waterhouse & Lisa Darmanin (AUS)
- 2019 – Jason Waterhouse & Lisa Darmanin (AUS)
- 2021 – Samuel Albrecht & Gabriela Nicolino (BRA)
- 2022 – Sarah Newberry Moore & David Liebenberg (USA)

=== Tornado ===
- 1991 – Sarah Glaser (USA)
- 1992 – Pete Melvin (USA)
- 1993 – John C. Lovell & Charlie Ogletree (USA)
- 1994 – David Williams & Ian Rhodes (GBR)
- 1995 – Andreas Hagara & Florian Schneeberger (AUT)
- 1996 – Andreas Hagara & Florian Schneeberger (AUT)
- 1997 – Robbie Daniel & Enrique Rodriguez (USA)
- 1998 – David Sweeney & Kevin Smith (CAN)
- 1999 – Lars Guck & P. J. Schaffer (USA)
- 2000 – John C. Lovell & Charlie Ogletree (USA)
- 2001 – Sean McCann & John Curtis (CAN)
- 2002 – Lars Guck & Jonathan Farrar (USA)
- 2003 – Roman Hagara & Hans-Peter Steinacher (AUT)
- 2004 – Enrique Figueroa & Jorge Hernández (PUR)
- 2005 – John C. Lovell & Charlie Ogletree (USA)
- 2006 – John C. Lovell & Charlie Ogletree (USA)
- 2007 – Darren Bundock & Glenn Ashby (AUS)

=== Men's Formula Kite ===
- 2023 – Markus Edegran (USA)

=== Women's Formula Kite ===
- 2023 – Daniela Moroz (USA)

=== Men's Iqfoil ===
- 2021 – Mateus Isaac (BRA)
- 2022 – Pedro Pascual (USA)
- 2023 – Noah Lyons (USA)

=== Women's Iqfoil ===
- 2021 – Garrett January (USA)
- 2022 – Dominique Stater (USA)
- 2023 – Dominique Stater (USA)

=== Men's Lechner A-390 ===
- 1991 – Greg Fenton (CAN)
- 1992 – Franck David (FRA)

=== Women’s Lechner A-390 ===
- 1991 – Lanee Butler (USA)
- 1992 – Caroll-Ann Alie (CAN)

=== Men’s Mistral ===
- 1993 – Dan Kerckhoff (USA)
- 1994 – Nikolaos Kaklamanakis (GRE)
- 1995 – Jean-Max de Chavigny (FRA)
- 1996 – Jorge Maciel (ESP)
- 1997 – Mike Gebhardt (USA)
- 1998 – Mike Gebhardt (USA)
- 1999 – Mike Gebhardt (USA)
- 2000 – Suzuki Kazuyoshi (JPN)
- 2001 – Peter Wells (USA)
- 2002 – David Mier (MEX)
- 2003 – Nikolaos Kaklamanakis (GRE)
- 2004 – João Rodrigues (POR)

=== Women's Mistral ===
- 1993 – Jayne Fenner (USA)
- 1994 – Dorien de Vries (NED)
- 1995 – Anne François (FRA)
- 1996 – Jayne Benedict (USA)
- 1997 – Lanee Butler (USA)
- 1998 – Helen Cartwright (GBR)
- 1999 – Lanee Butler (USA)
- 2000 – Stephanie Guto (GER)
- 2001 – Dominique Vallée (CAN)
- 2002 – Sigrid Rondelez (BEL)
- 2003 – Anja Käser (SUI)
- 2004 – Athina Frai (GRE)

=== Men’s RS:X ===
- 2006 – Nick Dempsey (GBR)
- 2007 – Przemysław Miarczyński (POL)
- 2009 – Dorian van Rijsselberghe (NED)
- 2010 – Dorian van Rijsselberghe (NED)
- 2011 – Dorian van Rijsselberghe (NED)
- 2012 – Nick Dempsey (GBR)
- 2013 – Iván Pastor (ESP)
- 2014 – Byron Kokkalanis (GRE)
- 2015 – Dorian van Rijsselberghe (NED)
- 2016 – Dorian van Rijsselberghe (NED)
- 2017 – Louis Giard (FRA)
- 2018 – Louis Giard (FRA)
- 2019 – Ye Bing (CHN)
- 2020 – Pedro Pascual (USA)

=== Women's RS:X ===
- 2006 – Bryony Shaw (GBR)
- 2007 – Marina Alabau (ESP)
- 2009 – Marina Alabau (ESP)
- 2010 – Marina Alabau (ESP)
- 2011 – Marina Alabau (ESP)
- 2012 – Demita Vega (MEX)
- 2013 – Maayan Davidovich (ISR)
- 2014 – Bryony Shaw (GBR)
- 2015 – Bryony Shaw (GBR)
- 2016 – Bryony Shaw (GBR)
- 2017 – Lu Yunxiu (CHN)
- 2018 – Hélène Noesmoen (FRA)
- 2019 – Lu Yunxiu (CHN)
- 2020 – Demita Vega (MEX)

=== Windfoil ===
- 2022 – J. P. Lattanzi (USA)
