= Sailing at the 2012 Summer Paralympics =

Sailing at the XIV Paralympic Games
- Venue: Weymouth; Portland
- Dates: 1 – 6 September 2012
- Competitors: 80 Sailors; 65 Male Sailors; 15 Female Sailors; 23 Nations; 41 Boats

Sailing at the 2012 Summer Paralympics in London was held from August in Weymouth and Portland. XYZ competitors representing XYZ countries will compete in three keelboat classes - the 2.4mR, the SKUD 18, and the Sonar, took part in sailing in the 2008 Summer Paralympics.

Competitors had a wide range of physical disabilities including degenerative nerve disease, blindness, missing limbs and polio.

Boats were prepared and launched from the docks of the Weymouth and Portland Sailing Academy.

== Events ==
Three sailing events were held. All were mixed events, meaning that men and women could compete together.

International disability classification in sailing is done by a committee, which gives each competitor a number score with lower numbers corresponding to more severe disability. Sailors were classified under the IFDS Functional Classification System. To take part in Paralympic sailing, an athlete must have a score of 7 or less.

Event	Boat	Classifications
Open Single-Person Keelboat	2.4mR	All sailors are required to have a minimal disability or a higher level of disability as defined in the FCS 2008–12.
Two-Person Keelboat	SKUD 18	Crew shall include a female with disability and one severely disabled sailor with a 1–2 point classification.
Open Three-Person Keelboat	Sonar	The total Sonar crew points shall not exceed 14 points.

The 2-person keelboat (SKUD18) was the only Paralympic class keelboat with a spinnaker, emblazoned with the national flag of each country. Of the 11 countries competing in the SKUD event, all had a female competitor with a disability.

== Results ==
=== Medal table ===
This ranking sorts countries by the number of gold medals earned by their sailors (in this context a country is an entity represented by a National Paralympic Committee. The number of silver medals is taken into consideration next and then the number of bronze medals. If, after the above, countries are still tied, equal ranking is given and they are listed alphabetically.

Rank	Nation	Gold	Silver	Bronze	Total
1	Great Britain (GBR)	1	0	1	2
1	Netherlands (NED)	1	0	1	2
3	Australia (AUS)	1	0	0	1
4	Germany (GER)	0	2	0	2
5	United States (USA)	0	1	0	1
6	Norway (NOR)	0	0	1	1
Totals (6 entries)		3	3	3	9

=== One Person Keelboat - 2.4 Metre ===
16 boats are to take part in the 2.4MR class.

Rank	Athlete	Race											Points	
Rank	Athlete	1	2	3	4	5	6	7	8	9	10	11 (Cancelled)	Tot	Net
Gold medal	Helena Lucas (GBR)	2	1	3	(11)	1	1	1	4	8	5		37	26
Silver medal	Heiko Kröger (GER)	4	3	5	1	4	(11)	6	1	10	1		46	35
Bronze medal	Thierry Schmitter (NED)	5	2	1	6	6	(9)	4	6	1	6		46	37
4	Damien Seguin (FRA)	1	(17); DSQ	4	4	10	2	13	5	3	2		61	44
5	Paul Tingley (CAN)	6	7	2	(10)	9	6	2	2	6	4		57	47
6	Mark Edward LeBlanc (USA)	3	8	7	5	13	(17); OCS	3	3	2	8		69	52
7	Matthew Bugg (AUS)	(8)	4	6	8	7	5	7	7	7	(17) DNS		73	56
8	Bjørnar Erikstad (NOR)	7	6	10	15	3	(17); OCS	8	8	7	3		84	67
9	Julio Reguero (PUR)	9	9	8	2	11	8	5	(13)	11	7		83	70
10	Fabrizio Olmi (ITA)	10	5	(15)	7	12	4	15	9	6	10		93	78
11	Jens Als Andersen (DEN)	13	(14)	9	14	2	10	9	14	5	21		101	87
12	Niko Salomaa (FIN)	11	(13)	11	3	5	7	12	10	16	(17) DNF			
13	Paul Francis (NZL)	14	10	14	12	(16)	3	11	12	14	9		115	99
14	George Delikouras (GRE)	(15)	11	12	9	8	(17) DSQ	10	11	13	14		120	103
15	Juan Fernandez Ocampo (ARG)	12	12	13	13	14	(17); OCS	14	15	15	12		137	120
16	Francisco Llobet (ESP)	(16)	15	16	16	15	12	16	(17) OCS	12	13		148	131

=== Two Person Keelboat - SKUD 18 ===
Rank	Nation (skipper first)	Race											Points	
Rank	Nation (skipper first)	1	2	3	4	5	6	7	8	9	10	11	Tot	Net
Gold medal	Dan Fitzgibbon and Liesl Tesch (AUS)	1	2	2	(3)	2	1	2	1	1	2		17	14
Silver medal	Jean-Paul Creignou and Jennifer French (USA)	3	(5)	1	1	3	2	1	4	2	3		25	20
Bronze medal	Alexandra Rickham and Niki Birrell (GBR)	2	1	(4)	2	1	3	4	2	3	5		27	22
4	John McRoberts and Stacie Louttit (CAN)	4	3	3	4	(12); OCS	4	3	3	6	4		46	34
5	Marco Gualandris and Marta Zanetti (ITA)	5	6 DPI	6	6	6	(9)	6	5	5	1		55	46
6	Hagar Zehavi and Shimon Ben Yakov (ISR)	6	7	7	5	(12); OCS	6	5	8	4	6		74	64
7	Kok Liang Desiree Lim and Wei Qiang Jovin Tan (SIN)	8	6	8	(10)	5	7	7	6	8	9		78	68
8	Carolina López Rodríguez and Fernando Alvarez (ESP)	7	(10)	9	8	7	8	8	7	7	7		84	73
9	Al Mustakim Matrin and Nurul Amilin Balawi (MAS)	10	8	(11)	9	4	5	9	9	11	8		78	68
10	Jan Freda Apel and Tim Dempsey (NZL)	9	9	5	7	8	(11)	10	10	9	10		88	77
11	Bruno Landgraf das Neves and Elaine Pedroso da Cunha (BRA)	11	11	10	11	(12); OCS	10	11	11	10	11		108	96

=== Open Three-Person Keelboat - Sonar ===
Rank	Nation (skipper first)	Race											Points	
Rank	Nation (skipper first)	1	2	3	4	5	6	7	8	9	10	11 Cancelled	Tot	Net
Gold medal	Mischa Rossen, Marcel van de Veen and Udo Hessels (NED)	(8)	2	2	1	1	3	3	2	1	5		28	20
Silver medal	Jens Kroker, Robert Prem and Siegmund Mainka (GER)	6	1	6	8	6	4	1	(9)	5	4		49	40
Bronze medal	Aleksander Wang-Hansen, Marie Solberg and Per Eugen Kristiansen (NOR)	(10)	4	5	4	5	1	8	1	8	1		61	37
4	Bruno Jourdren, Eric Flageul and Nicolas Vimont Vicary (FRA)	2	5	1	(15); DSQ	11	2	10	7	2	3		57	42
5	John Robertson, Hannah Stodel and Stephen Thomas (GBR)	4	8	4	5	4	(13)	10; DPI	7	2	3		58	45
6	Colin Harrison, Jonathan Harris and Stephen Churm (AUS)	1	3	(15); DSQ	2	8	9	7	3	6	9		62	47
7	Brad Johnson, Paul Callahan and Thomas Brown (USA)	3	6	8	3	2	8	5	10	3	(13)		30	22
8	Argiris Notaroglou, Thodoris Alexas and Vasilis Christoforou (GRE)	(12)	10	9	6	3	6	11	5	9	8		79	67
9	Arnon Efrati, Benni Vexler and Dror Cohen (ISR)	9	(13)	3	9	13	11	4	6	7	7		81	68
10	Bruce Millar, Logan Campbell and Scott Lutes (CAN)	5	9	10	7	6	7	7	8	(12)	11		81	68
11	Anthony Hegarty, Ian Costelloe and John Twomey (IRL)	11	7	7	10	10	10	2	(13)	10	10		89	76
12	Antonio Squizzato, Massimo Dighe and Paola Protopapa (ITA)	7	11	(12)	11	12	5	12	12	11	6		98	86
13	Edmund Rath, Kurt Badstöber and Sven Reiger (AUT)	13	12	11	12	9	(14)	13	11	13	12		119	105
14	Katsuya Nishiyama, Shin'ya Yamamoto and Tsuneo Aso (JPN)	(14)	14	13	13	14	12	14	14	14	14		135	121
