= Sailing at the 2008 Summer Paralympics =

Sailing at the XIII Paralympic Games
- Paralympic Sailing
- Venue: Qingdao International Sailing Centre
- Dates: 8–13 September 2008
- Competitors: 67 Male Sailors; 13 Female Sailors; 25 Nations; 41 Boats

Eighty athletes representing 25 countries in three keelboat classes - the 2.4mR, the SKUD 18, and the Sonar, took part in sailing in the 2008 Summer Paralympics. Sailing was held in two designated areas on the Yellow Sea, Qingdao, Shandong province, from September 8 to September 13.

Competitors had a wide range of physical disabilities including degenerative nerve disease, blindness, missing limbs, and polio.

Boats were prepared and launched from the docks of the Qingdao International Sailing Centre, which also included the accessible Qingdao Paralympic Village, a 5-star hotel which previously housed the Olympic Sailing athletes.

== Events ==
Three sailing events were held. All were mixed events, meaning that men and women could compete together.

International disability classification in sailing is done by a committee, which gives each competitor a number score with lower numbers corresponding to more severe disability. Sailors were classified under the IFDS Functional Classification System 2005 (FCS 2005). To take part in Paralympic sailing, an athlete must have a score of 7 or less. Functional Classification System full details:

Event	Boat	Classifications
Single-Person Keelboat	2.4mR	All sailors are required to have a minimal disability or a higher level of disability as defined in the FCS 2005.
Two-Person Keelboat	SKUD 18	Crew shall include a female and one severely disabled sailor with a 1-point classification.
Three-Person Keelboat	Sonar	The total Sonar crew points shall not exceed 14 points.

The 2-person keelboat (SKUD18) made its official début in the Paralympics. The only Paralympic class keelboat with a spinnaker, emblazoned with the national flag of each country. Of the 11 countries competing in the SKUD event, 7 had female crew.

== Results ==
Eighty athletes represented twenty-five countries in the three event classes. Qualification full details

=== Medal table ===
This ranking sorts countries by the number of gold medals earned by their sailors (in this context a country is an entity represented by a National Paralympic Committee. The number of silver medals is taken into consideration next and then the number of bronze medals. If, after the above, countries are still tied, equal ranking is given and they are listed alphabetically.

Rank	Nation	Gold	Silver	Bronze	Total
1	Canada (CAN)	1	0	1	2
1	United States (USA)	1	0	1	2
3	Germany (GER)	1	0	0	1
4	France (FRA)	0	2	0	2
5	Australia (AUS)	0	1	1	2
Totals (5 entries)		3	3	3	9

=== Medallists ===
In the 2-person keelboat event, all three of the medal-winning teams were composed of one man and one woman. Those three women were the first women to win Paralympic medals in sailing. Sailing competition athletes and full results.

Event	Gold	Silver	Bronze
1-person keelboat 2.4mR	Paul Tingley; Canada	Damien Seguin; France	John Ruf; United States
2-person keelboat SKUD 18	United States (USA); Nick Scandone; Maureen McKinnon-Tucker	Australia (AUS); Daniel Fitzgibbon; Rachael Cox	Canada (CAN); John McRoberts; Stacie Louttit
3-person keelboat Sonar	Germany (GER); Jens Kroker; Robert Prem; Siegmund Mainka	France (FRA); Bruno Jourdren; Herve Larhant; Nicolas Vimont-Vicary	Australia (AUS); Colin Harrison; Russell Boaden; Graeme Martin

=== One Person Keelboat - 2.4 Metre ===
Rank	Athlete	Race										Points	
Rank	Athlete	1	2	3	4	5	6	7	8	9	10	Tot	Net
Gold medal	Paul Tingley (CAN)	1	1	5	2	(9)	(9)	2	4	5	1	39	21
Silver medal	Damien Seguin (FRA)	4	4	3	4	6	(17); OCS	(11)	1	1	2	39	21
Bronze medal	John Ruf (USA)	2	6	1	(9)	1	7	(10)	3	4	4	47	28
4	Heiko Kröger (GER)	3	2	(11)	6	4	3	1	(11)	2	7	50	28
5	Thierry Schmitter (NED)	5	3	2	(10)	7	1	5	(12)	6	3	54	32
6	Jens Als Andersen (DEN)	(9)	7	6	1	2	6	3	5	(9)	9	57	39
7	Helena Lucas (GBR)	(10)	5	7	7	3	4	(12)	2	8	5	63	41
8	Bjørnar Erikstad (NOR)	6	8	(16)	(13)	8	2	9	6	13	12	93	64
9	Julio Reguero (PUR)	7	(17); OCS	13	5	5	8	(15)	7	7	13	97	65
10	Fabrizio Olmi (ITA)	8	9	8	(16)	12	11	13	(16)	3	6	102	70
11	Qi Mingxue (CHN)	11	11	4	(15)	(15)	5	4	13	14	10	102	72
12	Aaron Hill (AUS)	(12)	10	10	8	10	(13)	6	8	10	11	98	73
13	George Delikouras (GRE)	(15)	13	9	3	13	(14)	7	14	12	8	106	79
14	Zoltán Pegan (HUN)	13	(15)	12	11	14	(15)	8	10	11	14	123	93
15	Emilio Fernandez (ESP)	14	12	15	12	11	10	(16)	9	(16)	5	130	98
16	Juhani Mattila (FIN)	(16)	14	14	14	(16)	12	14	15	15	16	146	114

=== Two Person Keelboat - SKUD 18 ===
Rank	Nation (skipper first)	Race											Points	
Rank	Nation (skipper first)	1	2	3	4	5	6	7	8	9	10	11 Cancelled	Tot	Net
Gold medal	Nick Scandone and Maureen McKinnon-Tucker (USA)	2	1	1	1	(3)	2	1	1	2	(12); DNS		26	11
Silver medal	Dan Fitzgibbon and Rachel Cox (AUS)	(4)	2	2	2	2	4	(9)	3	1	2		31	18
Bronze medal	John McRoberts and Stacie Louttit (CAN)	3	3	3	3	1	3	2	(8)	(4)	3		33	21
4	Hailiang Jia and Xiujuan Yang (CHN)	1	4	7	7	5	6	(8)	4	(8)	1		51	35
5	Alexandra Rickham and Niki Birrell (GBR)	5	5	(8)	(8)	4	1	4	7	7	4		53	37
6	Al Mustakim Matrin and Nurul Amilin Balawi (MAS)	(10)	6	(12); DSQ	5	6	5	6	2	3	6		61	39
7	Carl-Gustad Fresk and Birgitta Jacobsson Nilen (SWE)	6	(9)	4	4	7	(12); RAF	3	5	9	7		66	45
8	Wei Qiang Jovin Tan and Kok Liang Desiree Lim (SIN)	7	7	5	6	(8)	7	7	(11)	5	5		68	49
9	Bento Amaral and Luisa Silvano (POR)	8	8	6	(9)	(9)	8	5	6	6	8		73	55
10	Amy Kelehan and John Twomey (IRL)	9	(10)	9	(10)	10	9	10	9	10	9		95	75
11	Pedro Sollique and Cherry Pinpin (PHI)	(11)	(11)	10	11	11	10	11	10	11	10		106	84

=== Open Three-Person Keelboat - Sonar ===
Rank	Nation (skipper first)	Race											Points	
Rank	Nation (skipper first)	1	2	3	4	5	6	7	8	9	10	11	Tot	Net
Gold medal	Jens Kroker, Robert Prem and Siegmund Mainka (GER)	5	6	3	1	4	(11)	5	2	(9)	4	5	55	35
Silver medal	Bruno Jourdren, Herve Larhant and Nicolas Vimont-Vicary (FRA)	4	1	1	2	7	1	(10)	5	8	7	(15); DNF	61	36
Bronze medal	Colin Harrison, Jonathan Harris and Graeme Martin (AUS)	8	4	2	3	3	3	1	(10)	(15); OCS	5	7	61	36
4	Aleksander Wang-Hansen, Marie Solberg and Per Eugen Kristiansen (NOR)	6	2	5	8	1	(15); OCS	(9)	1	5	3	6	61	37
5	Dor Cohen, Amon Efrati and Benny Vexler (ISR)	3	(15); DSQ	4	(15); DSQ	2	6	6	12	1	1	3	69	38
6	John Robertson, Hannah Stodel and Stephen Thomas (GBR)	(9)	3	6	(9)	5	7	8	6	3	2	1	59	41
7	Vasilis Christoforou, Thodoris Alexas and Nikolaos Paterakis (GRE)												58	41
8	Rick Doerr, Tim Angle and Bill Donohue (USA)												69	47
9	Paul McCarthy, Paul Ryan and Martin Richard Whealey (IRL)												96	72
10	Li Ke, Tao Wang and Jungkun Xu (CHN)												101	75
11	Ken Kelly, Don Terlson and Marc Shaw (CAN)												114	86
12	Marco Collinetti, Massimo Veturini and Antonio Squizzato (ITA)												115	87
13	Edmund Rath, Sven Reiger and Helmut Seewald (AUT)												117	88
14	Luiz César Faria, Rossano Leitão and Darke Mattos (BRA)												125	99
