= 2015 ISAF Sailing World Cup =

Event title
- Edition: 8th
- Dates: 7 December 2014 – 1 November 2015
- Yachts: 2.4 Metre, 470, 49er, 49er FX, Finn, Formula Kite, Laser, Laser Radial, Nacra 17, RS:X, SKUD 18, Sonar

Results
- (gold) Gold: United Kingdom
- (silver) Silver: Australia
- (bronze) Bronze: France

The 2015 ISAF Sailing World Cup was a series of sailing regattas staged during 2014–15 season. The series featured boats which feature at the Olympics and Paralympics.

== Regattas ==
2015 regattas

Date	Regatta	City	Country
7–14 December 2014	ISAF Sailing World Cup Melbourne	Melbourne	Australia
24–31 January 2015	ISAF Sailing World Cup Miami	Miami	United States
20–26 April 2015	ISAF Sailing World Cup Hyères	Hyères	France
8–14 June 2015	ISAF Sailing World Cup Weymouth	Weymouth	United Kingdom
14–20 September 2015	ISAF Sailing World Cup Qingdao	Qingdao	China
27 October – 1 November 2015	ISAF Sailing World Cup Final	Abu Dhabi	United Arab Emirates

== Results ==
=== 2.4 Metre ===
Regatta	Winner	Country	Ref
Melbourne	Matthew Bugg	Australia	
Miami	Bjørnar Erikstad	Norway	
Hyères	Damien Seguin	France	
Weymouth (disabled)	Helena Lucas	Great Britain	

=== Men's 470 ===
Regatta	Winners	Country	Ref
Melbourne	Alexander Conway; Patrick Conway	Australia	
Miami	Luke Patience; Elliot Willis	Great Britain	
Hyères	Šime Fantela; Igor Marenić	Croatia	
Weymouth	Stuart McNay; David Hughes	United States	
Qingdao	Hao Lan; Wang Chao	China	
Abu Dhabi	Mathew Belcher; Will Ryan	Australia	

=== Women's 470 ===
Regatta	Winners	Country	Ref
Melbourne	Sasha Ryan; Amelia Catt	Australia	
Miami	Jo Aleh; Polly Powrie	New Zealand	
Hyères	Fernanda Oliveira; Ana Barbachan	Brazil	
Weymouth	Hannah Mills; Saskia Clark	Great Britain	
Qingdao	Ai Kondo Yoshida; Miho Yoshioka	Japan	
Abu Dhabi	Hannah Mills; Saskia Clark	Great Britain	

=== Men's 49er ===
Regatta	Winners	Country	Ref
Melbourne	Nathan Outteridge; Iain Jensen	Australia	
Miami	Nico Delle Karth; Nikolaus Resch	Austria	
Hyères	Peter Burling; Blair Tuke	New Zealand	
Weymouth	Peter Burling; Blair Tuke	New Zealand	
Qingdao	Kim Sung-wok; Yang Ho-yeob	South Korea	
Abu Dhabi	Nico Delle Karth; Nikolaus Resch	Austria	

=== Women's 49er FX ===
Regatta	Winners	Country	Ref
Melbourne	Ragna Agerup; Maia Agerup	Norway	
Miami	Alex Maloney; Molly Meech	New Zealand	
Hyères	Ida Marie Baad Nielsen; Marie Thusgaard Olsen	Denmark	
Weymouth	Martine Grael; Kahena Kunze	Brazil	

=== Men's Finn ===
Regatta	Winner	Country	Ref
Melbourne	Edward Wright	Great Britain	
Miami	Giles Scott	Great Britain	
Hyères	Giles Scott	Great Britain	
Weymouth	Giles Scott	Great Britain	
Qingdao	Gong Lei	China	
Abu Dhabi	Ivan Kljaković Gašpić	Croatia	

=== Open Formula Kite ===
Regatta	Winner	Country	Ref
Weymouth	Florián Trittel	Spain	
Abu Dhabi	Oliver Bridge	Great Britain	

=== Men's Laser ===
Regatta	Winner	Country	Ref
Melbourne	Tom Burton	Australia	
Miami	Philipp Buhl	Germany	
Hyères	Tom Burton	Australia	
Weymouth	Philipp Buhl	Germany	
Qingdao	Lorenzo Chiavarini	Great Britain	
Abu Dhabi	Tom Burton	Australia	

=== Women's Laser Radial ===
Regatta	Winner	Country	Ref
Melbourne	Alison Young	Great Britain	
Miami	Anne-Marie Rindom	Denmark	
Hyères	Evi Van Acker	Belgium	
Weymouth	Marit Bouwmeester	Netherlands	
Qingdao	Zhang Dongshuang	China	
Abu Dhabi	Josefin Olsson	Sweden	

=== Mixed Nacra 17 ===
Regatta	Winners	Country	Ref
Melbourne	Jason Waterhouse; Lisa Darmanin	Australia	
Miami	Vittorio Bissaro; Silvia Sicouri	Italy	
Hyères	Billy Besson; Marie Riou	France	
Weymouth	Jason Waterhouse; Lisa Darmanin	Australia	
Qingdao	Justin Liu; Denise Lim	Singapore	

=== Men's RS:X ===
Regatta	Winner	Country	Ref
Melbourne	Juozas Bernotas	Lithuania	
Miami	Dorian van Rijsselberghe	Netherlands	
Hyères	Pierre Le Coq	France	
Weymouth	Nick Dempsey	Great Britain	
Qingdao	Liu Chunzhuang	China	
Abu Dhabi	Iván Pastor	Spain	

=== Women's RS:X ===
Regatta	Winner	Country	Ref
Melbourne	Stefania Elfutina	Russia	
Miami	Bryony Shaw	Great Britain	
Hyères	Lilian de Geus	Netherlands	
Weymouth	Flavia Tartaglini	Italy	
Qingdao	Wu Jiahui	China	
Abu Dhabi	Bryony Shaw	Great Britain	

=== Mixed SKUD 18 ===
Regatta	Winners	Country	Ref
Melbourne	Daniel Fitzgibbon; Liesl Tesch	Australia	
Miami	Daniel Fitzgibbon; Liesl Tesch	Australia	
Weymouth	Alexandra Rickham; Niki Birrell	Great Britain	

=== Para Sonar ===
Regatta	Winners	Country	Ref
Miami	Aleksander Wang-Hansen; Per Eugen Kristiansen; Marie Solberg	Norway	
Hyères	Bruno Jourdren; Eric Flageul; Nicolas Vimont-Vicary	France	
Weymouth	Colin Harrison; Jonathan Harris; Russell Boaden	Australia	
