= 2023 Sailing World Championships – RS Venture Connect =

RS Venture Connect at the 2023 Sailing World Championships
- Venue: The Hague, the Netherlands
- Dates: 11–16 August
- Competitors: 32 from 15 nations

Medalists
gold medal	Ange Margaron; Olivier Ducruix	France
silver medal	Pedro Reis; Guilherme Ribeiro	Portugal
bronze medal	John McRoberts; Scott Lutes	Canada

The RS Venture Connect competition at the 2023 Sailing World Championships was the open two-person technical para event and was held in The Hague, the Netherlands, 11–16 August 2023. The entries were limited to 18 boats. The competitors participated in a series that was planned to 10 races. The last race was planned for 16 August.

== Summary ==
Ange Margaron and Olivier Ducruix of France took the lead the first day by two race wins, one point ahead of Pedro Reis and Guilherme Ribeiro of Portugal. Margaron and Ducruix won the event with one day to spare. Margaron and Ducruix won six out of ten races. The other medals were decided so that Reis and Ribeiro took the silver medals, while John McRoberts and Scott Lutes of Canada became bronze medallists.

== Results ==
Results of individual races
Pos	Crew	Country	I	II	III	IV	V	VI	VII	VIII	IX	X	Tot	Pts
Gold medal	Ange Margaron; Olivier Ducruix	France	1	1	1	1	1	1	2^{†}	2	1	2	13	11
Silver medal	Pedro Reis; Guilherme Ribeiro	Portugal	2	1	2	1	3	2	1	2	2	8^{†}	24	16
Bronze medal	John McRoberts; Scott Lutes	Canada	3	6^{†}	4	2	1	1	1	1	2	4	25	19
4	Pau Homar; Ramón Gutiérrez	Spain	1	RET 9^{†}	1	2	2	4	5	1	1	3	29	20
5	Vasileios Christoforou; Theodoros Alexas	Greece	7^{†}	2	2	3	3	2	3	3	4	1	30	23
6	Furkan Erçin; Büşra Nur Çelik	Turkey	5	3	3	6^{†}	2	4	3	3	6	3	38	32
7	Tim Tromer; Nadine Loschke	Germany	4	5	3	6^{†}	6	6	2	4	4	5	45	39
8	Katelijne Langezaal; Arend Pet	Netherlands	7^{†}	4	5	4	7	7	6	4	3	2	49	42
9	Daniel Amiguet; Philippe Echivard	Switzerland	2	2	4	8	4	5	NSC 9^{†}	7	7	5	53	44
10	Mikael Ek; Richard Norén	Sweden	3	5	7	3	4	5	5	6	8^{†}	6	52	44
11	Adam Billany; Emily Wright	Great Britain	5	3	6	8^{†}	5	3	4	7	6	6	53	45
12	Shan McAdoo; Maureen McKinnon	United States	STP 7	DSQ 9^{†}	UFD 9	5	6	6	6	5	3	1	57	48
13	Simone Mazzanti; Emiliano Giampietro	Italy	8	7	5	4	RET 9^{†}	3	7	5	5	4	57	48
14	Henriette Smith; Solfrid Kvinnesland	Norway	4	4	6	7^{†}	5	7	4	6	5	7	55	48
15	Sami Al-Sulaimi; Ghalia Al-Jabri	Oman	6	8	7	7	8	8	8	DNF 9^{†}	7	7	75	66
16	Jasper Zuidervaart; Wieke Mulder	Netherlands	8	RET 9^{†}	8	5	7	8	7	8	8	8	76	67

Scoring system: low-point system; Source:
Legend: DNF – Did not finish; DSQ – Disqualified; NSC – Did not sail the course; RET – Retired; STP – Standard penalty imposed; UFD – "U" flag disqualification; † – Discarded race not counted in the overall result;
