= Jorge Maciel =

Jorge Maciel may refer to:

- Jorge Maciel (sailor), Spanish windsurfer and sailor
- Jorge Maciel (football manager), Portuguese football manager
