= Hervé Larhant =

French sailor

Duko Bos
Personal information
- Nationality: France

Sailing career
- Sport: Sailing
- Class: Sonar

Hervé Larhant is a French Paralympic sailor who won a silver medal at the 2008 Summer Paralympics in the Sonar, alongside Bruno Jourdren and Nicolas Vimont-Vicary.
