= Scandone =

Scandone may refer to:

- Nick Scandone (1966–2009), American yachtsman
- S.S. Felice Scandone, also known for sponsorship reasons as Sidigas Avellino, Italian professional basketball club based in Avellino
