= Cherrie Pinpin =

Filipina Paralympic sailor

Personal information
- Full name: Cherrie Samonte Pinpin
- Nickname: Cherry
- Nationality: Filipino
- Born: October 27, 1962 (age 63) Quezon City

Sport
- Country: Philippines
- Sport: Sailing
- Club: Taal Lake Yacht Club
- Coached by: Peter Tablate
Medal record
Sailing
Representing Philippines
Para World Championships
Bronze medal – third place	2017 Kiel	Women's Hansa 303
ASEAN Para Games
Silver medal – second place	2015 Singapore	Women's Hansa 2.3

Cherrie "Cherry" Samonte Pinpin (born October 27, 1962), is a Filipina Paralympic sailor who crewed in the SKUD 18 Two-Person Keelboat class, Sailing at the 2008 Summer Paralympics, Beijing.

== Early life ==
Cherrie Samonte Pinpin was born in Quezon City on October 27, 1962. A below knee osteosarcoma developed starting age 9 so by age 11, she elected for an above-knee amputation to halt the spread of cancer. She attended the UP Integrated School, Diliman, Quezon City but graduated as a Visual Arts scholar from the Philippine High School for the Arts, Los Baños, Laguna. Pinpin graduated with a BFA Visual Communication degree from the University of the Philippines Diliman, Quezon City.

== Sailing career ==
Training home base is Taal Lake Yacht Club, who run inclusive sailing events. The changing weather conditions in Taal Lake has helped improve her boat-handling skills in light to heavy weather.

Pinpin has raced an assortment of sailboats in both para and open fleets. She previously crewed for South African Paralympian Russell Vollmer on a Simonis Voogd-designed SV14 2-person keelboat provided by Disabled Sailing Thailand, 2.4mR Paralympic-class keelboats in Hong Kong, Topcat catamarans with the Romblon Yacht Club likewise raced multihulls, home-built wooden dinghies and Oz Goose dinghies in Taal Lake.

=== 2005 ASEAN Para Games, Manila and 2006 FESPIC Games, Malaysia ===
Pinpin first competed for the Philippines in para sailing (introduced as a demo sport), in the 2005 ASEAN Para Games, Manila. SailabilitySingapore donated two Hansa 2.3 keelboats to the Philippines in December 2005 to help jumpstart para sailing in the Philippines. Her first international regatta was the 2006 FESPIC Games, Kuala Lumpur, racing a faster Hansa Liberty keelboat.

=== 2008 IFDS Two-person Keelboat World Championships, Changi, Singapore ===
In March 2008, she and skipper Sollique qualified the Philippines for a Paralympic Sailing slot after racing a SKUD 18 in the 2008 IFDS Two-person Keelboat World Championships, Singapore. With no SKUD 18 in Manila, the pair scrambled to practice for Paralympic Sailing using a borrowed, adapted FlyingFifteen keelboat, sailing in Manila Bay.

=== 2008 Beijing Summer Paralympics ===
One of the 3 Philippine Paralympians in the 2008 Summer Paralympics in Beijing, Pinpin crewed a SKUD 18 for severely disabled helm Pedro Sollique in the two-person keelboat event held off Qingdao.

=== 2015 ASEAN Para Games, Singapore ===
Back in the international circuit after putting in time on the water (7 years in Taal Lake) improving comprehension of sailing strategy, tactics plus winning regattas more often, she took the Para Team Sailing at the 2015 ASEAN Para Games. Pinpin won silver in the Women's Hansa 2.3 Single Person keelboat class while Bernardo took Bronze.

=== 2017 Paralympic Development Program, Hong Kong ===
Pinpin and Bernardo started their 2017 Sailing season in Hong Kong, attending Para World Sailing's Paralympic Development Program which included Para World Sailing's Strategic Plan' on how to help get Para Sailing reinstated in the Paralympics. The women sailors likewise tried new Paralympic class boats for the first time - Pinpin raced a more technical Norlin 2.4 One Design keelboat while Bernardo a Hansa 303, both supplied by World Sailing partner, SailabilityHK.

=== 2017 Para World Sailing Championships, Kiel, Germany ===
Countless hours on Taal Lake came in handy as Pinpin battled ferocious “survival” sailing conditions in the Baltic Sea during the 2017 Para World Sailing Championships in Kiel, Germany, where she won the Bronze medal in the Women's Hansa 303. Filipina teammate Clytie Bernardo finished at 4th place.

== Other sports ==
In between sailing training in 2007, she took 8 months to relearn SH1 Air Rifle (Paralympic shooting) at the PNSA Range. Pinpin went on to win the Para Shooting SH1 Women’s Standing R2 bronze medal in the January 2008 ASEAN Para Games, Nakhon Ratchasima, Thailand.

== Work ==
Many years in an advertising career morphed into Pinpin teaching Multimedia Arts and creative thinking in 3 universities. Then a stint as Apple Solutions Expert covering hardware and software solutions for the education and creative fields.

When not giving sailing tutorials or preparing for her next sailing campaign, Pinpin works as a freelance creative director. She was the executive producer for Liquid, a watersports television series.

== Recognition ==
In World Sailing's Philippine Member National Authority page, Pinpin was recognized in October 2018 as Top Ranked Philippine Female Sailor, ranked #7 worldwide (women sailors) in the Hansa 303 class.

In December 2012, Pinpin was among the inspirational persons with disabilities featured in the Fully Abled Nation (FAN) initiative, a disability-inclusive elections program to increase participation of PWDs to vote in the May 2013 elections. The campaign was produced by Vera Files in cooperation with the Asia Foundation, with support from the Australian Agency for International Development (AusAID).

Pinpin received the Apolinario Mabini Award twice - in 1996 (Disabled Filipino of the Year) for rescuing a drowning girl off Changi, Singapore, a selfless act which may have helped resumption of diplomatic relations between Singapore and the Philippines, nearly a year after the Contemplacion scandal. And in 1985 (Ist Runner – up, Disabled Filipino of the Year) for target shooting achievements despite disability. The Disabled Filipino of the Year award is awarded for outstanding contributions by disabled Filipinos, who have served as role models to inspire both able and persons with disabilities.
