= Pete Spaulding =

American sailor

Personal information
- Nationality: American
- Born: November 28, 1975 (age 50) Newtown, Pennsylvania, United States

Sport
- Sport: Sailing

Pete Spaulding (born November 28, 1975) is an American sailor. He competed in the 49er event at the 2004 Summer Olympics.
