= Ian Harrison (sailor) =

British Paralympic sailor

Ian Harrison MBE
Personal information
- Full name: Ian Hamilton Harrison
- Born: 21 March 1937 Poole, UK
- Died: 26 August 2016 (aged 79) Leicester, UK

Sailing career
- Sport: Sailing
- Class(es): Sonar, Challenger, 2.4 Metre
Medal record
Sailing
Representing Great Britain
Paralympic Games
Gold medal – first place	1996 Atlanta	Sonar

Ian Hamilton Harrison (21 March 1937 – 26 August 2016) was a British Paralympic sailor and para sailing administrator. He won gold at the 1996 Summer Paralympics, where the sport made its Paralympic debut.

In his youth, Harrison was a sailor in the Snipe, before sailing on HMS Worcester, While in India, he caught polio, resulting in disability. His legacy was in the formation of Sailability and the International Foundation for Disabled Sailing, the inclusion of the sport within the Paralympics and the work with World Sailing on integration of disabled sports. Together with Andy Cassell, Kevin Curtis, and Tony Downs, he won the Sonar event at the sailing demonstration events of the 1996 Summer Paralympics.

For his work within para sailing, he was recognised at various stages: in 1988, he was awarded Member of the British Empire (MBE); in 2005, he was awarded the IPC Paralympic Order; and in 2008, he was awarded the World Sailing Long Service Gold Medal.
