= Kenneth Kelly (sailing) =

Canadian Paralympic athlete and 1996 Paralympic Silver Medalist

Ken Kelly (born 1944 in Moose Jaw, Saskatchewan) is a Canadian Paralympic athlete and 1996 Paralympic Games Silver Medalist.

== Career ==
In 1996, Ken competed in the 1996 Paralympic Games in mixed crewboat with Kirk Westergaard, John McRoberts and David Cook. The team won silver. The team was coached by Cindy Sheppard (Hardie).

The team was awarded Sail Canada's Skippers’ Plan Male Athlete/Team of the Year, which is given to a Canadian Sailing Team athlete or team with a record of outstanding achievement in national and international competition.

In 2008, Ken competed for Canada in Mixed Three Person Sonar at the 2008 Summer Paralympics in Beijing with Marc Shaw and Don Terlson. The team placed eleventh.
