= Bradley Kendell =

American Paralympic sailor

Personal information
- Full name: Bradley J Kendell
- Nationality: United States
- Born: 8 February 1981 (age 45) Clearwater, Florida
Medal record
Representing United States
Paralympic Games
Sailing
Silver medal – second place	2016 Rio de Janeiro	3-person keelboat (sonar)
ISAF Sailing World Cup
Silver medal – second place	2015 Miami	Para Sonar

Bradley Jackson Kendell (born 8 February 1981 in Clearwater, Florida) is a U.S. Paralympic sailor. He won a silver medal in the 2016 Summer Paralympics in the three-person keelboat (Sonar).

== Biography ==
In 2003, he lost both his legs in an airplane accident which killed his father and a family friend, the only other people aboard. His father was originally from New Zealand and also a sailor.

He received a hero's welcome at Tampa International Airport after returning from Rio as a Paralympic Games silver medalist.
