= Stacie Louttit =

Canadian Paralympic sailor

Personal information
- Nationality: Canadian
- Citizenship: Canadian
- Born: 12 March 1961 (age 65) Great Falls, Montana, U.S.
- Height: 175 cm (5 ft 9 in)
- Weight: 60 kg (132 lb)

Sport
- Country: Canada
- Sport: Sailing
Medal record
Sailing
Representing Canada
Paralympic Games
Bronze medal – third place	2008 Beijing	2-person keelboat (SKUD18)

Stacie Louttit (born 12 March 1961) is a Canadian Paralympic sailor. She became the first female Canadian sailor to win a medal in the Olympics or Paralympics by winning a bronze medal in the 2008 Summer Paralympics in Beijing in the 2-person keelboat (SKUD18) and also competed in the 2012 Summer Paralympics.

== Personal life ==
She was born in Great Falls, Montana, United States. Louttit broke her back in a skiing accident in 1994. In 1998, she began walking with a cane in 1998 and joined the Disabled Sailing Association of British Columbia.

== Career ==
Louttit qualified for her second games, the 2012 Summer Paralympics in London, with crew John Scott McRoberts by winning a silver medal at the qualifier.
