= Robert Prem =

German Paralympic sailor (born 1957)

Personal information
- Nationality: Germany
- Born: 12 June 1957 (age 69)

Sport
- Sport: Sailing
- Club: Yacht Club Berlin Grunau
Medal record
Sailing
Representing Germany
Paralympic Games
Gold medal – first place	2008 Beijing	Sonar
Silver medal – second place	2012 London	Sonar
World Championships
Gold medal – first place	2009	Sonar

Robert "Bobby" Prem (born 12 June 1957) is a German sailor from Berlin who competed in two Paralympics games, winning gold in 2008 and a silver medal in 2012 both times in the sonar class with skipper Jens Kroker and fellow crew member Siegmund Mainka.
