= Mischa Rossen =

German Paralympic sailor

Personal information
- Nationality: Netherlands
- Born: 23 March 1972 (age 54)

Sport
- Sport: Sailing
Medal record
Sailing
Representing Netherlands
Paralympic Games
Gold medal – first place	2012 London	Sonar - Open - Disabled
Silver medal – second place	2008 Beijing	Sonar - Open - Disabled
World Championships
Gold medal – first place	2010	Sonar - Open - Disabled
Gold medal – first place	2003	Sonar - Open - Disabled
Silver medal – second place	2013	Sonar - Open - Disabled
Bronze medal – third place	1999	Sonar - Open - Disabled

Mischa Rossen (born 23 March 1972) is a Dutch sailor who has competed in four Paralympics games winning silver in 2004 and gold in 2012 both in the three person keelboat the sonar.
