= Jorge Maciel (sailor) =

Spanish windsurfer

Personal information
- Full name: Jorge Maciel Andrés
- Nationality: Spanish
- Born: 31 August 1970 (age 56) La Guardia, Pontevedra, Spain
- Height: 175 cm (5 ft 9 in)
- Weight: 65 kg (143 lb)

Sailing career
- Sport: Sailing
- Class: Mistral

Jorge Maciel Andrés (Note: In this Spanish name, the first or paternal surname is Maciel and the second or maternal family name is Andrés.) (born 31 August 1970) is a Spanish windsurfer. He competed at the 1996 Summer Olympics and the 2000 Summer Olympics.
