= Hugh Freund =

American Paralympic sailor

Personal information
- Nationality: American
- Born: February 18, 1988 (age 38) Portland, Maine

Sailing career
- Sport: Sailing
Medal record
Representing United States
Paralympic Games
Sailing
Silver medal – second place	2016 Rio de Janeiro	Sonar)

Hugh Freund (born February 18, 1988) is a U.S. Paralympic sailor. He was part of the team that won the silver medal at the 2016 Summer Paralympic games in the three-person keelboat Sonar in Rio.
