= John Ruf =

American paralympic sailor (1968–2026)

Personal information
- Born: John Federick Ruf; March 4, 1968 Chicago, Illinois, U.S.
- Died: July 8, 2026 (aged 58)
- Education: Washington University in St. Louis; University of Wisconsin–Madison

Sport
- Country: United States
- Sport: Sailing
Medal record
Representing United States
Paralympic Games
Sailing
Bronze medal – third place	2008 Beijing	Mixed 1-person keelboat 2.4mR

John Federick Ruf (March 4, 1968 – July 8, 2026) was an American paralympic sailor. He competed at the 2008 Summer Paralympics.

== Life and career ==
Ruf was born with a spinal tumor in Chicago, Illinois, the son of Fritz and Sally Ruf. He grew up sailing on Pewaukee Lake in Waukesha County, Wisconsin. He attended Washington University in St. Louis and the University of Wisconsin–Madison, earning his law degree. After earning his degree, he worked as a businessman. With his spinal tumor, in 1999, he had lost his ability to walk.

Ruf competed at the 2008 Summer Paralympics, winning the bronze medal in the mixed 1-person keelboat 2.4mR event. He was named the world champion at the 2009 2.4 Metre World Championship in Fort Myers, Florida.

== Death ==
Ruf died on July 8, 2026, at the age of 58.
