= Andy Cassell =

British Paralympic sailor (1942–2025)

Personal information
- Full name: Andrew Cassell
- Nationality: British
- Born: 14 July 1942 East Sussex, England
- Died: 18 March 2025 (aged 82) Cowes, Isle of Wight, England

Sailing career
- Sport: Sailing
- Club: Cowes Corinthian Yacht Club; Island Sailing Club
Medal record
Sailing
Representing United Kingdom
Paralympic Games
Gold medal – first place	1996 Atlanta	Mixed Three Person Sonar
IFDS World Championships
Silver medal – second place	1999	Open Three Person Sonar
Silver medal – second place	2001	Open Three Person Sonar

Andrew Cassell (14 July 1942 – 18 March 2025) was a British Paralympic sailor who won gold at the 1996 Summer Paralympics, where the sport made its Paralympic debut. He was born in East Sussex, England.

Residing in Cowes on the Isle of Wight he had been sailing for decades before the Paralympics and worked for Ratsey and Lapthorne sailmakers sailing in high-profile yachting events. He was one of the early advocates of sailing being included in the Paralympics and in 1996 he founded the Andrew Cassell Foundation which purchased a fleet of sonar keelboats which have been used to introduce thousands of disabled people to sailing. The Foundation is still active 25 years later.

Cassell died from sepsis following heart surgery in Cowes, on 18 March 2025. He was 82. He remained active at Cowes Corinthian Yacht Club and the Andrew Cassell Foundation until his death.
