= Paul Tingley =

Canadian Paralympic sailor

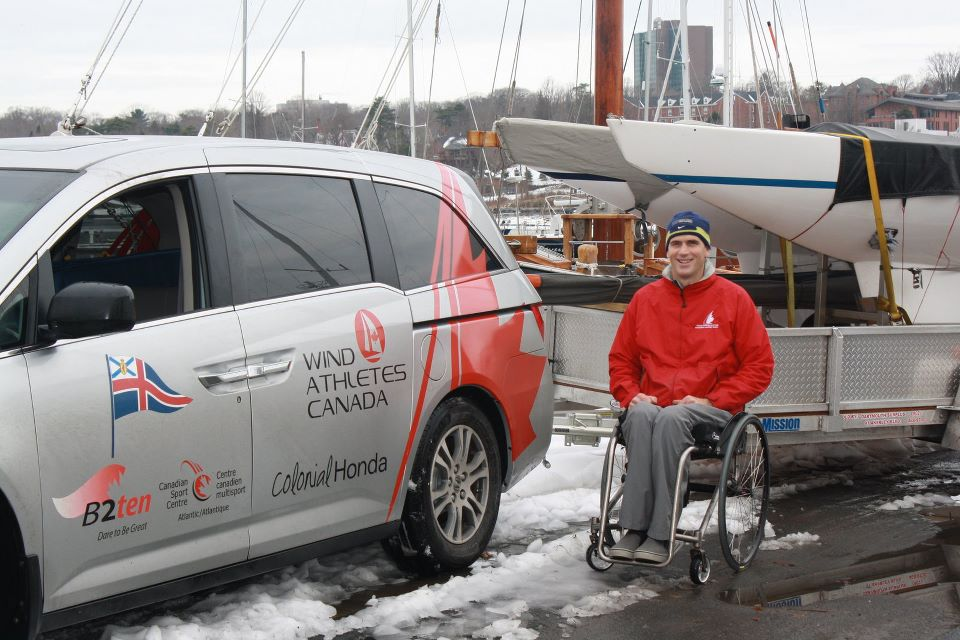
- Tingley in 2011

Personal information
- Born: June 1, 1970 (age 56)

Sailing career
- Sport: Sailing
Medal record
Sailing
Representing Canada
Paralympic Games
Bronze medal – third place	2000 Sydney	Sonar
Gold medal – first place	2008 Beijing	2.4 Metre
Bronze medal – third place	2016 Rio de Janeiro	Sonar

Paul Tingley (born June 1, 1970) is a Canadian sailor who represented the country at the Paralympics, in sailing keelboat. He is a resident of Halifax, Nova Scotia who became disabled due to a skiing accident at 24. He became interested in sailing through the suggestion of a physiotherapist.

== Results ==
=== Paralympics ===
Tingley completed at five Paralympic Games, winning three medals:

1. Bronze medal in Sonar at the 2000 Summer Paralympics
2. Competed in the 2004 Summer Paralympics
3. Gold medal in 2.4 Metre at the 2008 Summer Paralympics
4. Competed in the 2012 Summer Paralympics
5. Bronze medal in Sonar at the 2016 Summer Paralympics

=== World Championships ===
He also won a bronze medal at the 2009 2.4m World Championships (Fort Myers, Florida) and a gold at the 2010 World Championship (Hoorn, Netherlands) competing against both able bodied and disabled sailors.
