= Rick Doerr =

American Paralympic sailor

Personal information
- Nationality: United States
- Born: November 21, 1960 (age 65) Passaic, New Jersey, U.S.
- Home town: Clifton, N.J.
- Education: New England College 1982, Biology/Bioengineering
- Occupation(s): Physician in plastic and reconstructive surgery

Sport
- Sport: Sailing
Medal record
Sailing
Representing United States
Paralympic Games
Sailing
Silver medal – second place	2016 Rio	3-person keelboat (sonar)
ISAF Sailing World Cup
Silver medal – second place	2017	Para Sonar
IFDS Disabled Sailing World Championships - Sonar
Gold medal – first place	2015	Disabled - Open - Sonar
Gold medal – first place	2007	Disabled - Open - Sonar

Alphonsus "Rick" Doerr (born November 21, 1960) is a U.S. Paralympic sailor. He won a silver medal at the 2016 Summer Paralympics in the three-person keelboat Sonar. Doerr was formerly a lacrosse player until his career was cut short by a car accident.
