= John Robertson (Paralympic sailor) =

British Paralympic sailor (born 1972)

John Curtis-Robertson
Personal information
- Nationality: Great Britain
- Born: 11 February 1972 (age 54) Sunderland, England

Sailing career
- Sport: Sailing
- Class: Sonar
Medal record
Sailing
Representing Great Britain
Disabled World Championships
Gold medal – first place	2005 Sønderborg	Mixed Sonar
Gold medal – first place	2006 Perth	Mixed Sonar
Gold medal – first place	2015 Melbourne	Mixed Sonar
Silver medal – second place	2010 Medemblik	Mixed Sonar
Silver medal – second place	2011 Weymouth	Mixed Sonar
Bronze medal – third place	2003 Athens	Mixed Sonar
Bronze medal – third place	2012 Charlotte Harbour	Mixed Sonar

John Curtis-Robertson (born 11 February 1972 is a British Paralympic sailor. Curtis-Robertson has represented Great Britain at three Summer Paralympics and with his colleagues Stephen Thomas and Hannah Stodel has won multiple medals in the Mixed Sonar class at the Disabled Sailing World Championships, including skippering his team to back to back gold medals in 2005 and 2006.

== Personal life ==
Robertson was born in Sunderland, England in 1972. After leaving school he joined the Royal Air Force, but in 1994 a motorbike accident left him paralysed from the waist down and he was invalided out of the force.

John married Louise Curtis-Robertson in 2022.

== Sailing career ==
Robertson was first introduced to sailing by his father when he was 11, piloting mirror's off the coast in Sunderland. After his accident in 1994, he was introduced to Paralympic trimarans by a spinal injuries charity during an outward bound course in the Lake District. In 1997 he began sailing Sonar's.

By 2003 Robertson was joined by fellow British sailor Hannah Stodel and newcomer to the sport, ice sledge hockey Paralympian Stephen Thomas, to make up a Mixed Sonar crew. In 2003 he travelled with his teammates to Athens to take part in the IFDS World Disabled Sailing Championship, where they secured the bronze medal. The following year the trio qualified for their first Summer Paralympics, the 2004 games at Athens, finishing sixth in the Sonar class.

Robertson, Thomas and Stodel would remain as a team for over 12 years, with major successes coming in the 2005 World Championships in Sønderborg and the 2006 World Championships in Perth where Robertson skippered them to gold in the Sonar class. They represented Britain in their second Paralympics, in the 2008 Games in Beijing. They again finished sixth. Two silver medals in the 2010 and 2011 IFDS World Championships were followed by their third successive Paralympics, this time on home surf when the games came to London. The London Paralympics ended in disappointment for Robertson and his teammates after they were deducted four points after a team bosun cleaned the port side of their keel after being authorized to inspect the craft for damage. The deduction saw the British team drop to fifth and the bronze medal going to Norway, just three points ahead of them.

In the run up to the 2016 Summer Paralympics in Rio, Robertson skippered his crew to a third World Championship, beating the Australian team by a single point.
