= Siegmund Mainka =

German Paralympic sailor

Personal information
- Nationality: Germany
- Born: 4 July 1968 (age 57)

Sport
- Sport: Sailing
- Club: Yachtclub Berlin-Grunau
Medal record
Sailing
Representing Germany
Paralympic Games
Gold medal – first place	2008 Beijing	Sonar
Silver medal – second place	2012 London	Sonar
World Championships
Gold medal – first place	2009	Sonar

Siegmund Mainka (born 4 July 1968) is a German sailor from Berlin who competed in three Paralympics games.

He won gold in 2008 and a silver medal in 2012, in the Sonar class. Both medals were achieved with skipper Jens Kroker and fellow crew member Robert Prem.
