= Maureen McKinnon-Tucker =

American paralympian yachtswoman (born 1965)

Medal record

Sailing

Representing the United States

Paralympic Games
Gold medal – first place	2008 Beijing	2-person keelboat (SKUD18)

Maureen McKinnon (formerly Maureen McKinnon-Tucker; born February 25, 1965) is an American paralympian yachtswoman. In 2008 in Beijing she became the first woman to represent the United States in sailing at a Paralympic Games and also the first woman to medal gold in Paralympic Sailing. At the games, McKinnon-Tucker and fellow skipper Nick Scandone won a gold medal for the US, sailing in the SKUD 18 class. Shortly after winning the gold in China, Nick died of Lou Gehrig's disease following a six-year illness.

McKinnon is the mother of two, has campaigned in four Paralympic cycles (Athens 2004, Beijing 2008, London 2012 and Rio 2016) and has been named to the US Sailing Team a total of eight times. She has been nominated and awarded several honors during her career spanning more than a decade. Presently, McKinnon is campaigning again in the SKUD 18 boat for the Rio Games with Ryan Porteous, 22 of San Diego, California.

The story of their 2008 journey to win gold in China while facing her teammate's terminal illness and her then 2-year-old son's brain cancer diagnosis is told in the book "Nick of Time" co-written by Cara Wilson.

== See also ==
- United States at the 2008 Summer Paralympics
- Sailing at the 2008 Summer Paralympics
