= Silvia Sicouri =

Italian sailor

Personal information
- Nationality: Italian
- Born: 27 September 1987 (age 38)

Sport
- Sport: Sailing
- Club: Fiamme Azzurre

Silvia Sicouri (born 27 September 1987) is an Italian competitive sailor.

She competed at the 2016 Summer Olympics in Rio de Janeiro, in the mixed Nacra 17.
