= Marcel van de Veen =

Dutch Paralympic sailor

Personal information
- Nationality: Netherlands
- Born: 3 October 1961 (age 64)

Sport
- Sport: Sailing
Medal record
Sailing
Representing Netherlands
Paralympic Games
Gold medal – first place	2012 London	Sonar - Open - Disabled
Silver medal – second place	2004 Athens	Sonar - Open - Disabled
World Championships
Gold medal – first place	2010	Sonar - Open - Disabled
Gold medal – first place	2003	Sonar - Open - Disabled

Marcel van de Veen (born 3 October 1961) is a Dutch sailor who has competed two Paralympics games winning silver in 2004 and gold in 2012 in the three person keelboat the sonar.
