= Nick Scandone =

Medal record

Representing the United States

Men's sailing

Paralympic Games
Gold medal – first place	2008 Beijing	2-person keelboat (SKUD18)

Nicholas Salvatore Scandone (March 4, 1966 – January 2, 2009) was an American yachtsman who narrowly missed participating on the U.S. team at the 1992 Summer Olympics and won a gold medal as a paralympian at the 2008 Summer Games.

== Biography ==
Scandone was born on March 4, 1966, in Santa Ana, California, and learned to sail in an eight-foot Sabot dinghy at the Balboa Yacht Club in California. He started sailing when he was eight-years old, after being given the choice by his mother to learn to sail or attend summer school. He attended the University of California, Irvine, where he was an All-American and won a national championship in 1988 and graduated in 1990.

In 1991, he won the National American title in the double-handed 470 class. Described by The New York Times as "a rising star in the sailing world in the 1980s and '90s", Scandone entered the 1992 Olympic trials as the favorite in 470 class but just missed earning a berth on the United States Olympic squad.

Following the disappointment in 1992, Scandone began working in the advertising profession and later became a restaurant equipment salesman.

=== Paralympic sailing ===
In July 2002, a doctor diagnosed what had started as chronic back pain as being caused by amyotrophic lateral sclerosis, commonly known as Lou Gehrig's disease. He quit his job and began training for the Paralympic Games in the single-handed 2.4 Meter keelboat, a craft that has been considered ideal for handicap integrated sailing since the sailor does not move in the boat, and everything is adjustable from right in front of the sailor, with both hand-steering and foot-steering possible.

By 2005, Scandone was participating as a Classification 7, under a system in which a Paralympic sailor's mobility is rated from 1 to 7, with the lowest number representing the most severe level of disability. He won the 2005 Open World Championships in the 2.4 Meter class in a regatta off the coast of Elba, Italy, defeating 87 other boats skippered by 60 able-bodied and 27 other disabled sailors, and was named as US Sailing's Rolex Yachtsman of the Year, making him the only Paralympic sailor ever to achieve the honor. However, by the end of 2006, his condition had advanced to the point where he was physically unable to participate in the 2.4-Meter class, which specifies single-handed operation, and was approaching Classification 1 status.

Scandone switched to the SKUD 18 class, a newly added Paralympic event for Classification 1 sailors that was the first Paralympic class to specify a quadriplegic member participating in the two-person crew. Together with crewmate Maureen McKinnon-Tucker, a paraplegic from Marblehead, Massachusetts, he won the gold medal at the U.S. Paralympic trials in 2007 held off of Newport, Rhode Island.

Heading towards the 2008 Summer Paralympics in China in 2008, Scandone's physical condition deteriorated further. His coaches had to modify the steering and seat systems, and had to change the electronic controls from toggles to buttons to accommodate the weakening of his fingers.

He was chosen by his fellow members of the 2008 United States Paralympics Team with the honor of being the flag bearer for the U.S. team at the opening ceremonies of the Paralympic Games in Beijing. Scandone and McKinnon-Tucker won most of their early races, but Scandone required feeding and hydration between races, sometimes intravenously. As the team had won most of their races, they did not have to compete on the final day of competition and won the gold medal in what was described as "dominating fashion". Scandone was nominated for the 2008 Yachtsman of the Year award for his gold-medal performance.

Before his death, he helped promote the Maritime Sciences and Seamanship Foundation at Balboa Yacht Club, a program that he created to encourage disabled sailors to participate in the sport.

Scandone died January 2, 2009, at his home in Fountain Valley, California, aged 42.

== See also ==
- Sailing at the 2008 Summer Paralympics
