= Udo Hessels =

Dutch Paralympic sailor

Personal information
- Nationality: Netherlands
- Born: 25 August 1965 (age 60)

Sport
- Sport: Sailing
Medal record
Sailing
Representing Netherlands
Paralympic Games
Gold medal – first place	2012 London	Sonar - Open - Disabled
Silver medal – second place	2004 Athens	Sonar - Open - Disabled
World Championships
Gold medal – first place	2010	Sonar - Open - Disabled
Gold medal – first place	2003	Sonar - Open - Disabled

Udo Hessels (born 25 August 1965) is a Dutch sailor who has competed in four Paralympics games winning silver in 2004 and gold in 2012 both in the three person keelboat the sonar.
