= Arnon Efrati =

Israeli Paralympic sailor

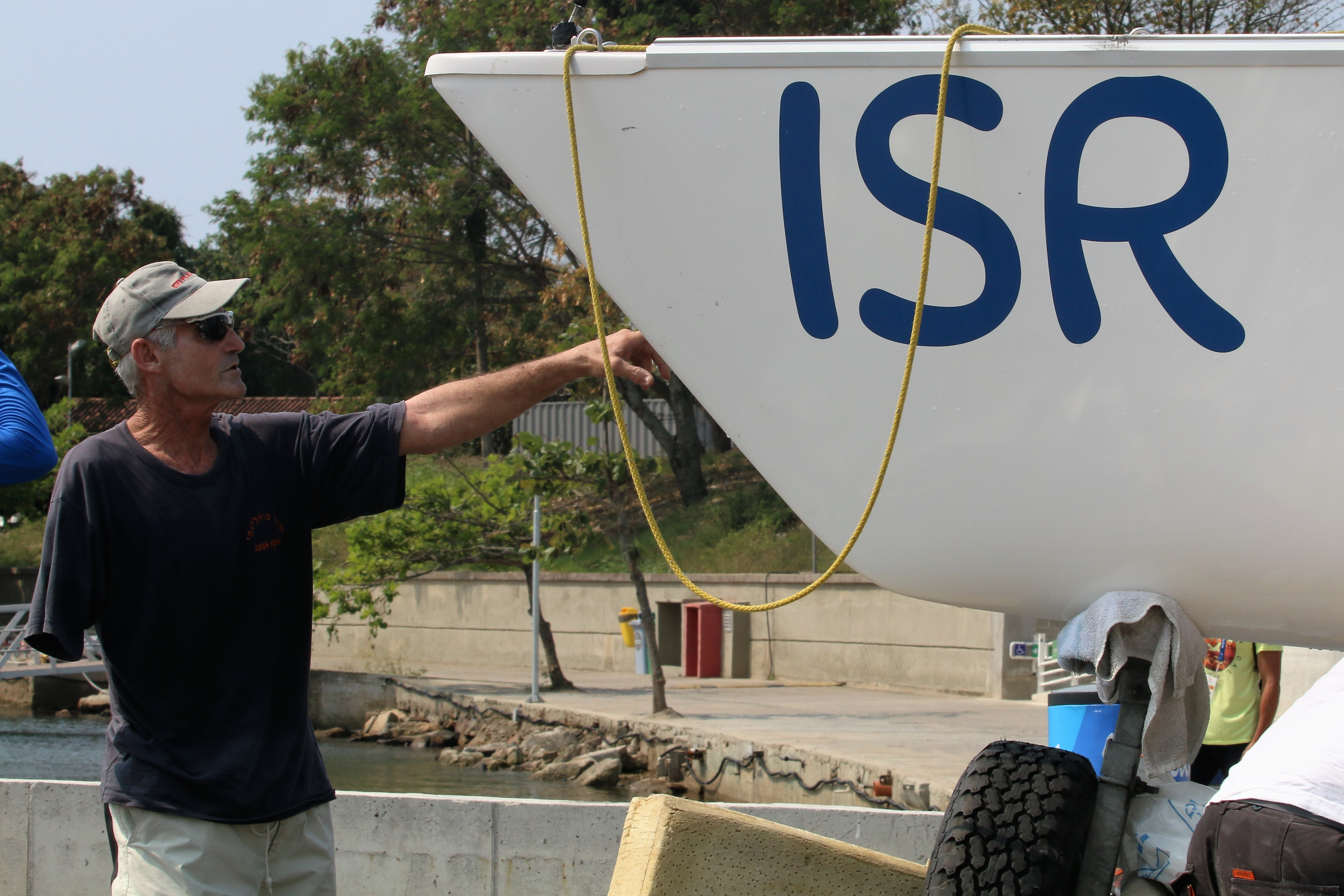
- Arnon Efrati

Personal information
- Native name: ארנון אפרתי
- Nationality: Israel
- Born: 17 February 1952 (age 74)

Sport
- Sport: Sailing
Medal record
Event	1st	2nd	3rd
Paralympic Games	1	0	0
IFDS World Championships	1	0	0
Representing Israel
Sailing
Paralympic Games
Gold medal – first place	2004	Sonar
World Championships
Gold medal – first place	2011	Sonar

Arnon Efrati (Hebrew: ארנון אפרתי; born 17 February 1952) is an Israeli sailor who has competed in five Paralympics games winning a gold in 2004 Athenes in the three person keelboat the sonar.
