= Dror Cohen (sailor) =

Israeli Paralympic sailor

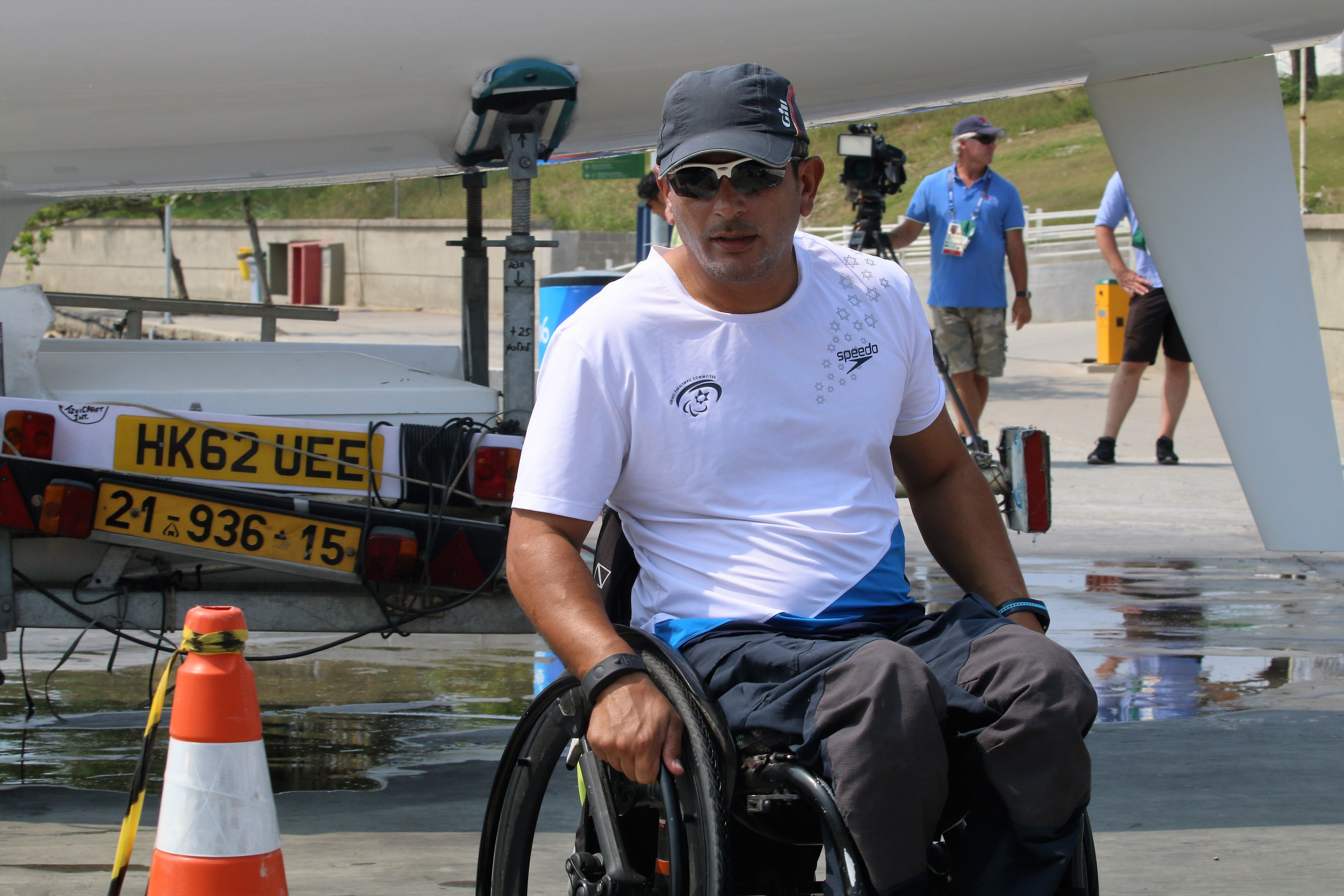
- Dror Cohen

Personal information
- Native name: דרור כהן
- Nationality: Israel
- Born: 31 March 1968 (age 58)

Sport
- Sport: Sailing
Medal record
Event	1st	2nd	3rd
Paralympic Games	1	0	0
IFDS World Championships	1	1	0
Representing Israel
Sailing
Paralympic Games
Gold medal – first place	2004	Sonar
World Championships
Gold medal – first place	2011	Sonar Open - Disabled
Silver medal – second place	2003	Three person keelboat

Dror Cohen (Hebrew: דרור כהן; born 31 March 1968) is an Israeli sailor who has competed in five Paralympics games winning a gold in 2004 Athenes in the three person Sonar-class keelboat.
