= Thierry Schmitter =

Dutch Paralympic sailor

Thierry Schmitter (France, May 6, 1969) is a French sailor who competed for the Netherlands. He sailed in the international and paralympic sailing class 2.4mR and has been a seated kitesurfer since 2013.

Schmitter was born in France but has lived in the Netherlands since the age of three. Starting at a young age, Thierry Schmitter was a mountaineer, ice climber and extreme skier in addition to being a sailor. Schmitter has participated in several climbing expeditions including in the Caucasus and the Pamir in the former Soviet Union, In 1995 Schmitter was a member of the Dutch K2 expedition. Three years later, he climbed the Shishapangma (8013m) in Tibet. A summary in image and text of his mountaineering years is displayed in the NKBV's digital archive.

In November 1998, Schmitter was swept away by an avalanche while ice climbing. He fell sixty meters deep, sustaining a spinal cord injury from the 12th thoracic vertebra. After his rehabilitation, Schmitter began sports again now he does handbiking, water skiing, skiing and competitive sailing. In 2004 Thierry Schmitter won the bronze medal at the 2004 Paralympic Summer Games in Athens in the 2.4mR boat, at the 2008 Games in Beijing he finished 5th in this boat. In 2011 he was elected disabled athlete of the year. At the World Championships in Charlotte Harbor June 2012, Schmitter qualified for the 2012 Paralympic Summer Games in London. At the 2012 Games, he earned a Bronze medal in the Paralympic 2.4mR. After that, Schmitter swapped the 2.4mR for kitesurfing, an extreme sport with very few seated (disabled) athletes.

In daily life, Schmitter works as a patent examiner at the European Patent Office.

Thierry is now seated kiteboarder. For more information see his website: www.sitkite.com

Awards
Preceded by Esther Vergeer	Dutch Disabled Sportsman / woman of the Year; 2011	Succeeded by Marlou van Rhijn
