= Niki Birrell =

British Paralympic sailor (born 1976)

Personal information
- Full name: Niki James Birrell
- Nationality: British
- Born: 16 August 1976 (age 49) Manchester, England

Sailing career
- Sport: Sailing
- Club: Weymouth and Portland National Sailing Academy, Parkstone Yacht Club
Medal record
Sailing
Representing Great Britain
Paralympic Games
Bronze medal – third place	2012 London	Mixed Two Person SKUD18
Bronze medal – third place	2016 Rio	Mixed Two Person SKUD18

Niki James Birrell (born 16 August 1976) is a British Paralympic sailor. Alongside Alexandra Rickham, he has won four IFDS World Championship titles and in the 2012 Summer Paralympics the pair took the bronze medal in the SKUD 18 two person keelboat class.

== Sailing ==
Birrell, who was born with cerebral palsy, began sailing at a young age after being introduced to the hobby by his father. In his youth, he sailed at Winsford Flash Sailing Club in Cheshire. He and his brother Christian became a competing pair, and in 2002 they were selected for the British team in the 420 class.

Birrell competed in the 2008 Paralympic Sailing Competition in the SKUD 18 two person keelboat class alongside teammate Alexandra Rickham, where he finished fifth. Between 2009 and 2011 Birrell and Rickham have won four IFDS World Championship titles.

Birrell was selected to represent Great Britain at the 2012 Summer Paralympics held in London, United Kingdom. He competed in the SKUD 2-person keelboat event with Rickham, for which they took the bronze medal.
