= Benny Vexler =

Israeli Paralympic sailor (born 1962)

Personal information
- Native name: בני וקסלר
- Nationality: Israel
- Born: 11 October 1962 (age 63)

Sport
- Sport: Sailing
Medal record
Event	1st	2nd	3rd
Paralympic Games	1	0	0
IFDS World Championships	1	1	0
Representing Israel
Sailing
Paralympic Games
Gold medal – first place	2004	Sonar
World Championships
Gold medal – first place	2011	Sonar Open - Disabled
Silver medal – second place	2003	Three person keelboat

Benny Vexler (Hebrew: בני וקסלר; born 11 October 1962), also known as Benni Vexler, is an Israeli sailor who has competed in three Paralympics games winning a gold in 2004 Athenes in the three person keelboat the sonar.
