= Jens Als Andersen =

Danish Paralympic sailor (born 1958)

Personal information
- Nationality: Danish
- Born: 22 August 1958 (age 67)

Sport
- Sport: Sailing
Medal record
Sailing
Representing Denmark
Paralympic Games
Silver medal – second place	2012 London	2.4 Metre
World Championships
Silver medal – second place	1999	2.4 Metre

Jens Als Andersen (born 22 August 1958) is a Danish sailor who has competed in four Paralympics games winning silver in 2000 in the single person keelboat the 2.4m / Norlin Mk3. His professional career was as director at A.P. Møller-Mærsk, the world's largest container shipping company. He broke his back in an accident in 1974 and has competed three times in the Single handed Trans-Atlantic Race (formerly the OSTAR).
