= Aleksander Wang-Hansen =

Norwegian sailor (born 1982)

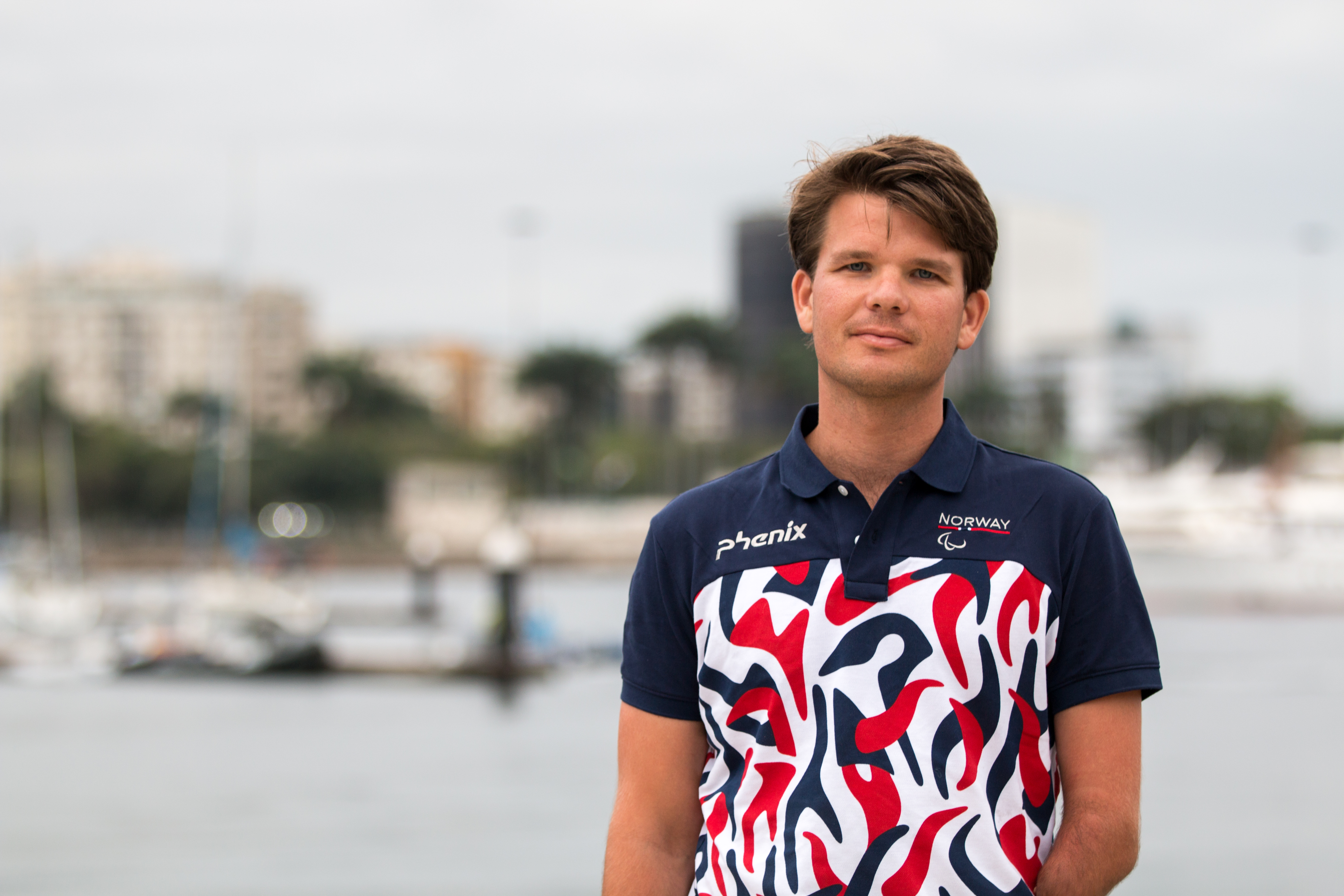

Personal information
- Nationality: (Norway) Norwegian
- Born: 19 March 1982 (age 44) Tønsberg, Norway
- Years active: 1999-2016
- Height: 1.87 m (6 ft 2 in)
- Weight: 89 kg (196 lb)

Sport
- Sport: Sailing
- Club: Kongelig Norsk Seilforening
- Coached by: Esben Slaatto from 2007
Medal record
Sailing
Representing Norway
Paralympic Games
| Bronze medal – third place | 2012 London | Sonar |
World Championships
| Silver medal – second place | 2005 Sonderborg | Sonar |
| Bronze medal – third place | 2006 Perth | Sonar |

Aleksander Wang-Hansen (born 19 March 1982 in Tønsberg) is a Norwegian sailor. He has taken part in the Paralympic Games since 2000, and achieved his best finish of third and a Bronze at the 2012 Summer Games in London, United Kingdom. Wang-Hansen also had a fourth place at the games in 2008 in Beijing, China, and a fifth place from the Games in 2016 in Rio de Janeiro.

He mostly sails in the Sonar class, and this was also the class where he finished fourth together Per Eugen Kristiansen and Jostein Stordahl. He competed with them at the 2000 Summer Paralympics in Sydney, Australia. This was boat number 11. At the 2004 Summer Paralympics in Athens, Greece, he was also boat number 11.

He has also competed at the World Championships, where he won gold in 2012, silver in 2005 and bronze in 2006, 2011 and 2015.

In 2010 and 2013, he won the World Cup together with Per Eugen Kristiansen and Marie Solberg. In 2011 and 2012, they finished third.

In 2005, together with Per Eugen Kristiansen and Jostein Stordahl, he was awarded the North Crew-prize and nominated for Sailor of the Year. In 2008, he won Sailor of the Year. He also won the award in 2012, alongside Marie Solberg and Per Eugen Kristiansen.

Aleksander is the elder brother of Sebastian Wang-Hansen, who took part in the 2012 Olympics in London in windsurfing. He is also the cousin of Mats Wang-Hansen, who is World Champion in sailing (Europe (dinghy) in 2000).
