= Per Eugen Kristiansen =

Norwegian sailor

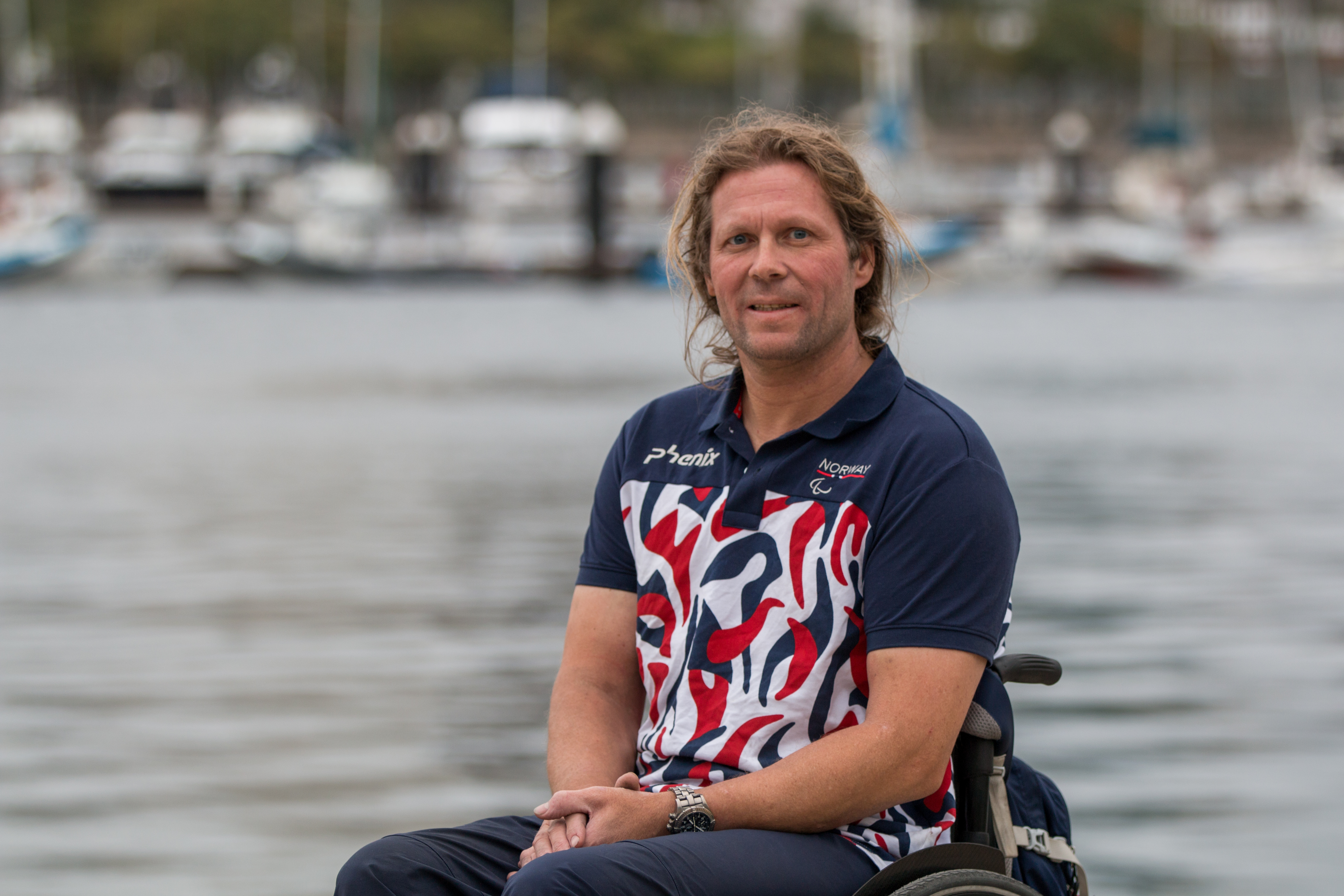

Personal information
- Nationality: (Norway) Norwegian
- Born: 8 April 1969 (age 57)
- Years active: 1994-

Sport
- Sport: Sailing
- Club: Kongelig Norsk Seilforening
- Coached by: Esben Slaatto from 2007
Medal record
Sailing
Representing Norway
Paralympic Games
Bronze medal – third place	2012 London	Sonar
World Championships
Silver medal – second place	2005 Sonderborg	Sonar
Bronze medal – third place	2006 Perth	Sonar

Per Eugen Kristiansen (born 8 April 1969) is a Norwegian sailor from Bekkestua who won a bronze medal at the 2012 Summer Paralympics in the Sonar class, together with Marie Solberg and Aleksander Wang-Hansen. He has sailed since he was 7. In 1994, he was involved in a climbing accident, and since then has been reliant on a wheelchair. Nine months later, he was an active sailor again. In 1998, he competed for the first time after a disabled sailor invited him to an event, and from then on, he has been an active regatta sailor. In January 2012, he won the World Sailing Championship in Florida.

In 1993, Kristiansen got his cand.scient. in organic chemistry from the University of Oslo. On 22 October 1999, he received his doctorate, and from 2000 to 2002, he undertook postdoctorate studies at Washington State University. From 2002 to 2005, he worked at the University of Oslo, where he is now a senior engineer in the department for biochemistry and molecular biology.
