= Scott Lutes =

Canadian Paralympic sailor

Personal information
- Born: 25 September 1962 (age 63) Moncton, New Brunswick, Canada
Medal record
Representing Canada
Paralympic Games
Sailing
Bronze medal – third place	2016 Rio de Janeiro	3-person keelboat (sonar)

Scott Lutes (born 25 September 1962) is a Canadian Paralympic sailor. He bronze team medalled at the 2016 Summer Paralympics in the Three-Person Keelboat (Sonar).
