= Logan Campbell (sailor) =

Canadian Paralympic sailor

Personal information
- Born: 12 October 1987 (age 38) Saskatoon, Saskatchewan, Canada

Sport
- Country: Canada
- Sport: Sailing
Medal record
Sailing
Representing Canada
Paralympic Games
Bronze medal – third place	2016 Rio de Janeiro	3-person keelboat (sonar)

Logan Campbell (born 12 October 1987) is a Canadian Paralympic sailor. He won a bronze medal at the 2016 Summer Paralympics in the Three-Person Keelboat (Sonar).
