= Jens Kroker =

German Paralympic sailor (born 1969)

Jens Kroger
Personal information
- Nationality: Germany
- Born: 8 May 1969 (age 57)

Sport
- Sport: Sailing
- Club: Yacht Club Meridian
Medal record
Sailing
Representing Germany
Paralympic Games
Gold medal – first place	2008 Beijing	Sonar
Silver medal – second place	2012 London	Sonar
World Championships
Gold medal – first place	2009	Sonar

Jens Kroker (born 8 May 1969) is a German sailor from Hamburg. Who has competed in 5 Paralympics games winning both a gold and silver medal.
