= John McRoberts =

Canadian Paralympic sailor

Personal information
- Full name: John Scott McRoberts
- Born: 14 September 1962 (age 63) Scarborough, Ontario, Canada
- Height: 185 cm (6 ft 1 in)
- Weight: 90 kg (200 lb)

Sport
- Country: Canada
- Sport: Sailing
Medal record
Paralympic Games
Men's Sailing
Representing Canada
Gold medal – first place	1996 Atlanta	Crewboat — Men
Bronze medal – third place	2008 Beijing	2-person keelboat (SKUD18)
- Updated on 31 August 2014

John Scott McRoberts (born 14 September 1962) is a Canadian paralympic sailor in the SKUD 18 class, who has competed in the 1996, 2008, and 2012 Paralympic Games.

== Personal life ==
McRoberts was born on 14 September 1962 in Scarborough, Ontario. He resides in Victoria, British Columbia. He became a quadriplegic at 18 years old after diving into shallow water.
