= Helena Lucas =

British Paralympic sailor

Helen Lucas MBE
Personal information
- Nationality: Great Britain

Sailing career
- Sport: Sailing
- Class: 2.4mR OneDesign
Medal record
Sailing
Representing Great Britain
Paralympic Games
Gold medal – first place	2012 London	2.4 mR – 1 person keelboat
Bronze medal – third place	2016 Rio	2.4 mR – 1 person keelboat

Helena Lucas MBE (born 29 April 1975) is a British Paralympic sailor.

== Personal life ==
Lucas was born on 29 April 1975 in Redhill, Surrey, England. She was born with a defect in both of her thumbs which makes her eligible to compete in Paralympic events.

In 1996 she graduated with a Bachelor of Engineering (BEng) degree in Yacht and Power Craft Design from Southampton Solent University. In 2013 she was awarded an honorary doctorate in sport from Southampton Solent University today in recognition of her outstanding contribution to sport and an honorary doctorate degree from Bournemouth University.

== Sailing ==
Lucas initially focused on competing in the 470 class in non-disabled competition, attempting to qualify to compete for Great Britain at both the 2000 Sydney Olympics and the 2004 Athens Games. After 2004 she switched to sailing in the 2.4mR class, a Paralympic event contested in a single-person keelboat. In 2006, she stood in for Shirley Robertson as a member of the British crew in the Yngling event at a test event for the 2008 Summer Olympics in Beijing, China; competing alongside Annie Lush and Lucy MacGregor, she won a silver medal.

She represented Great Britain at the 2008 Summer Paralympics in Beijing, finishing in seventh position in the 2.4mR.

Lucas was chosen to compete for Great Britain at the 2012 Summer Paralympics, again in the 2.4 mR – 1 person keelboat event. She was the last member of the British sailing team to be selected after the announcement of the 2.4 mR representative was delayed because of the close competition between Lucas and Megan Pascoe. At the Games she was the only woman in the fleet of 16 sailors who contested the event. Heading into the final race she was in first place and held a nine-point lead over second-place sailor Heiko Kroger of Germany, which meant she was guaranteed at least a silver medal. Due to a lack of wind the races on the final day of competition were cancelled, meaning Lucas won the gold medal. She became the first British sailor ever to win a Paralympic gold medal.

Lucas was appointed Member of the Order of the British Empire (MBE) in the 2013 New Year Honours for services to sailing.

In April 2015, she became the first person named to represent Great Britain at the 2016 Paralympics in Rio de Janeiro, where she won a bronze medal in the 2.4 mR – 1 person keelboat.
