= Marie Solberg =

Norwegian sailor from Sarpsborg (born 1988)

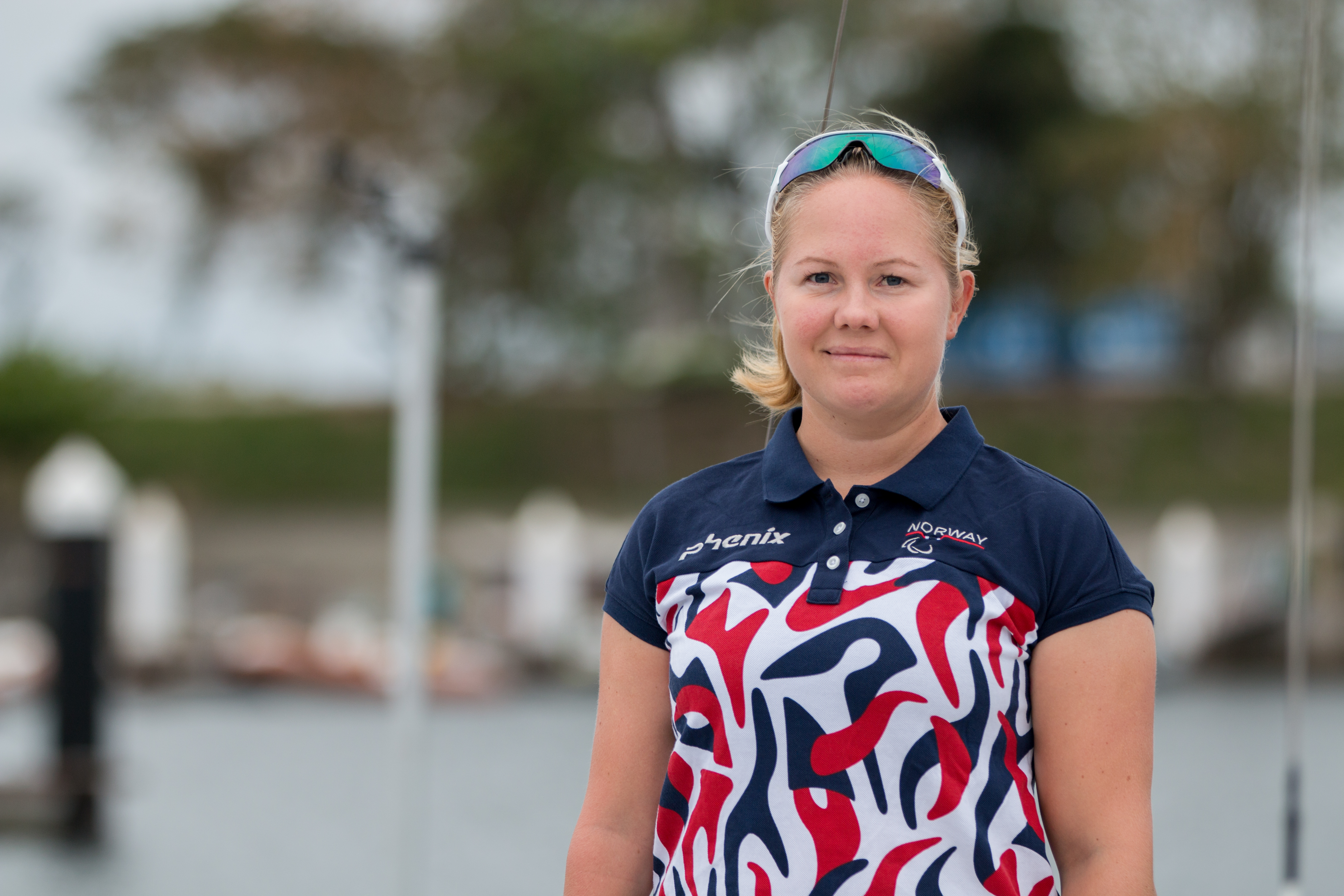

Personal information
- Nationality: (Norway) Norwegian
- Born: 6 June 1988 (age 38)

Sport
- Sport: Sailing
- Club: Kongelig Norsk Seilforening
- Coached by: Esben Slaatto from 2007
Medal record
Sailing
Representing Norway
Paralympic Games
Bronze medal – third place	2012 London	Sonar

Marie Solberg (born 6 June 1988) is a Norwegian sailor from Sarpsborg. She took part in the 2012 Summer Paralympics in London in the Sonar class and won a bronze medal together with Per Eugen Kristiansen and Aleksander Wang-Hansen. She works as a graphic designer and graduated from Høgskolen i Østfold, Halden.

In January 2012 Team Sonar Norway, which she is a part of, won the World Sailing Championships in their class in Florida. She joined the team in 2009 and her best performance was the medal at the Summer Paralympics in 2012.
