= Sonar (keelboat) =

Sailboat class

Development
- Designer: Bruce Kirby
- Location: Canada United States
- Year: 1980
- No. built: 860
- Builders: Seidelmann Yachts; Ontario Yachts; C. E. Ryder; Rondar Raceboats; DS Yachts; Shumway Marine
- Name: Sonar

Boat
- Displacement: 2,100 lb (953 kg)
- Draft: 3.92 ft (1.19 m)

Hull
- Type: monohull
- Construction: fibreglass
- LOA: 23.00 ft (7.01 m)
- LWL: 19.92 ft (6.07 m)
- Beam: 7.83 ft (2.39 m)

Hull appendages
- Keel: fin keel
- Ballast: 930 lb (422 kg)
- Rudder: internally-mounted spade-type rudder

Rig
- Rig type: Bermuda rig
- I foretriangle height: 25.00 ft (7.62 m)
- J foretriangle base: 8.90 ft (2.71 m)
- P mainsail luff: 27.50 ft (8.38 m)
- E mainsail foot: 11.20 ft (3.41 m)

Sails
- Sailplan: fractional rigged sloop
- Mainsail area: 154.00 sq ft (14.307 m^{2})
- Jib/genoa area: 111.25 sq ft (10.335 m^{2})
- Total sail area: 265.25 sq ft (24.643 m^{2})

Racing
- D-PN: 82.5

The Sonar is a one design keelboat designed by Bruce Kirby and first built in 1980.

The design was initiated as a commission from the members of the Noroton Yacht Club of Darien, Connecticut, United States.

The Sonar was inducted into the American Sailboat Hall of Fame in 2004.

The design was developed into the Blazer 23, using the same hull, but a larger cabin.

== Production ==
The design was first built by Seidelmann Yachts in Berlin, New Jersey, although the company went out of business in 1986. Other companies that have previously produced the boat include C. E. Ryder and Shumway Marine in the US, as well as Ontario Yachts and DS Yachts in Canada, with a few built by Carbon Index in the United Kingdom. Since 2015 the boat has been built by Rondar Raceboats in the UK and distributed manufacturer direct worldwide. A total of 860 boats have been built.

== Design ==
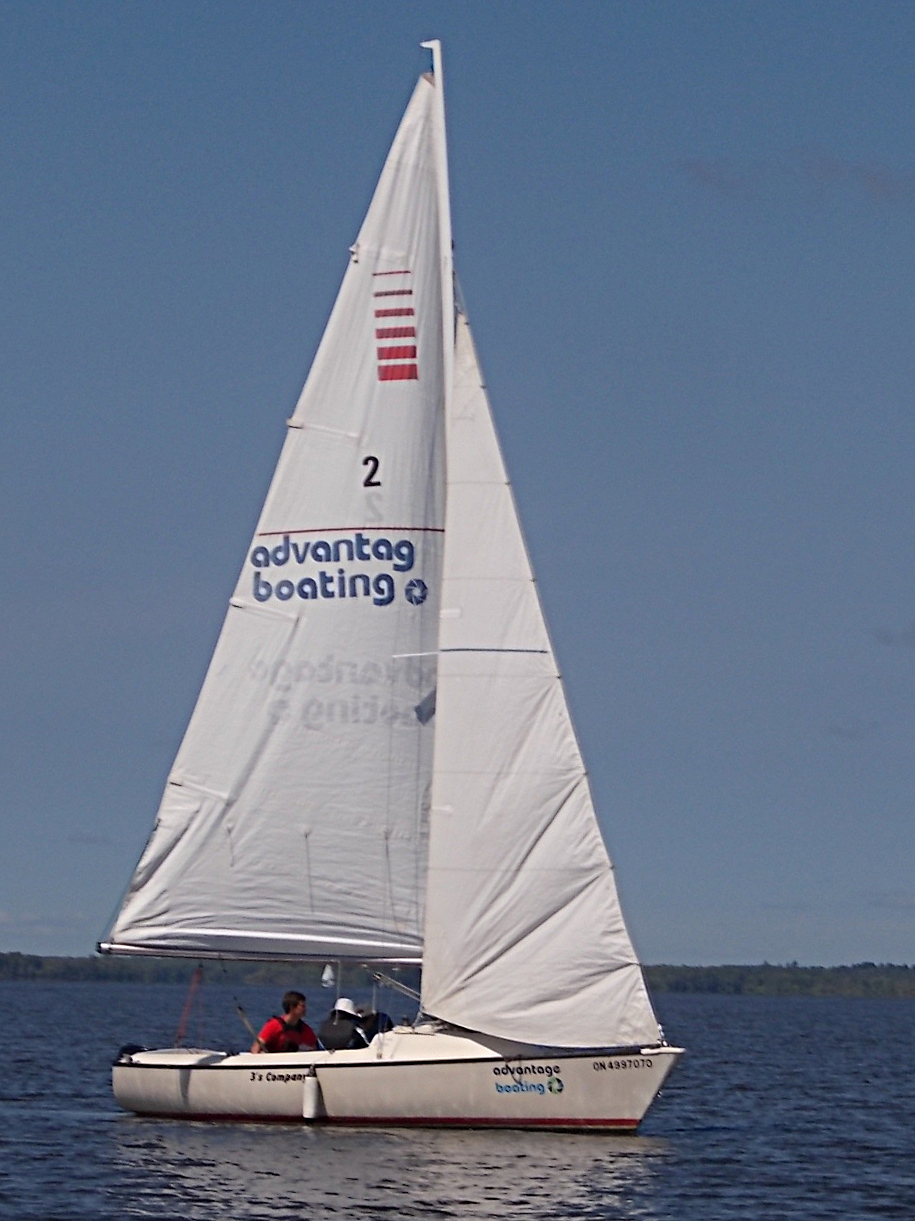
Sonar

The Sonar is built predominantly of fibreglass, with wood trim. It has a fractional sloop rig with aluminum spars, including a tapered boom, a raked stem, a reverse transom, an internally mounted spade-type rudder controlled by a tiller with an extension and a fixed fin keel. It displaces 2,100 lb (953 kg) and carries 930 lb (422 kg) of lead ballast.

The boat has a draft of 3.92 ft (1.19 m) with the standard keel.

The design has a cockpit 11.50 ft (3.51 m) long, with space for eight people. It has a small cuddy cabin that is used for stowage and can also house a portable head. The cuddy can also be fitted with two berths for sleeping accommodation.

The boat can plane downwind. For sailing the design is equipped with internal boom slab reefing, a 4;1 mechanical advantage mainsheet block, a backstay and a boom vang. Hiking is not permitted under the class sailing rules.

The design has a Portsmouth Yardstick DP-N racing average handicap of 82.5 and is normally raced with a crew of two to three sailors.

== Operational history ==
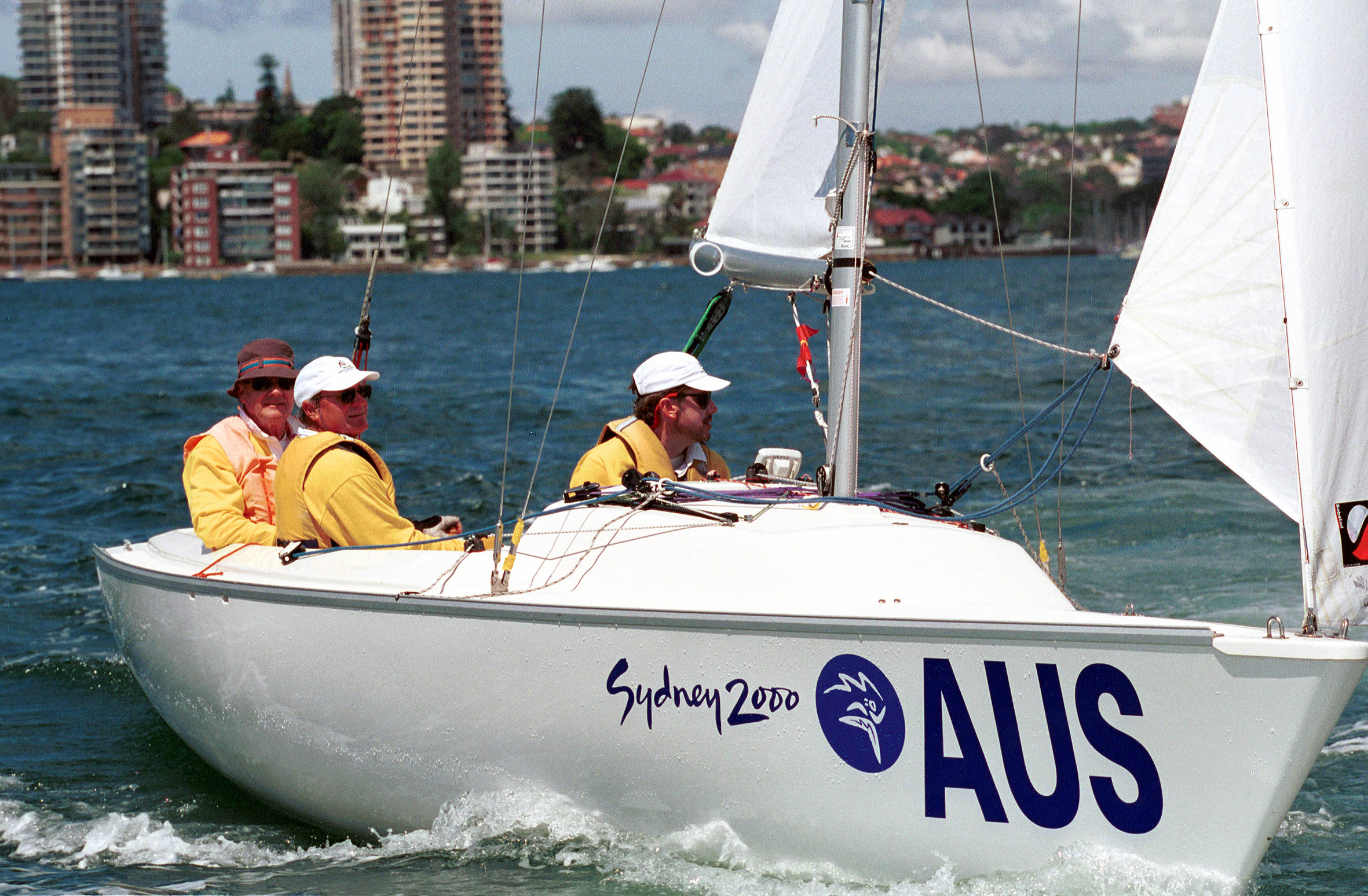
Sonar showing cockpit size

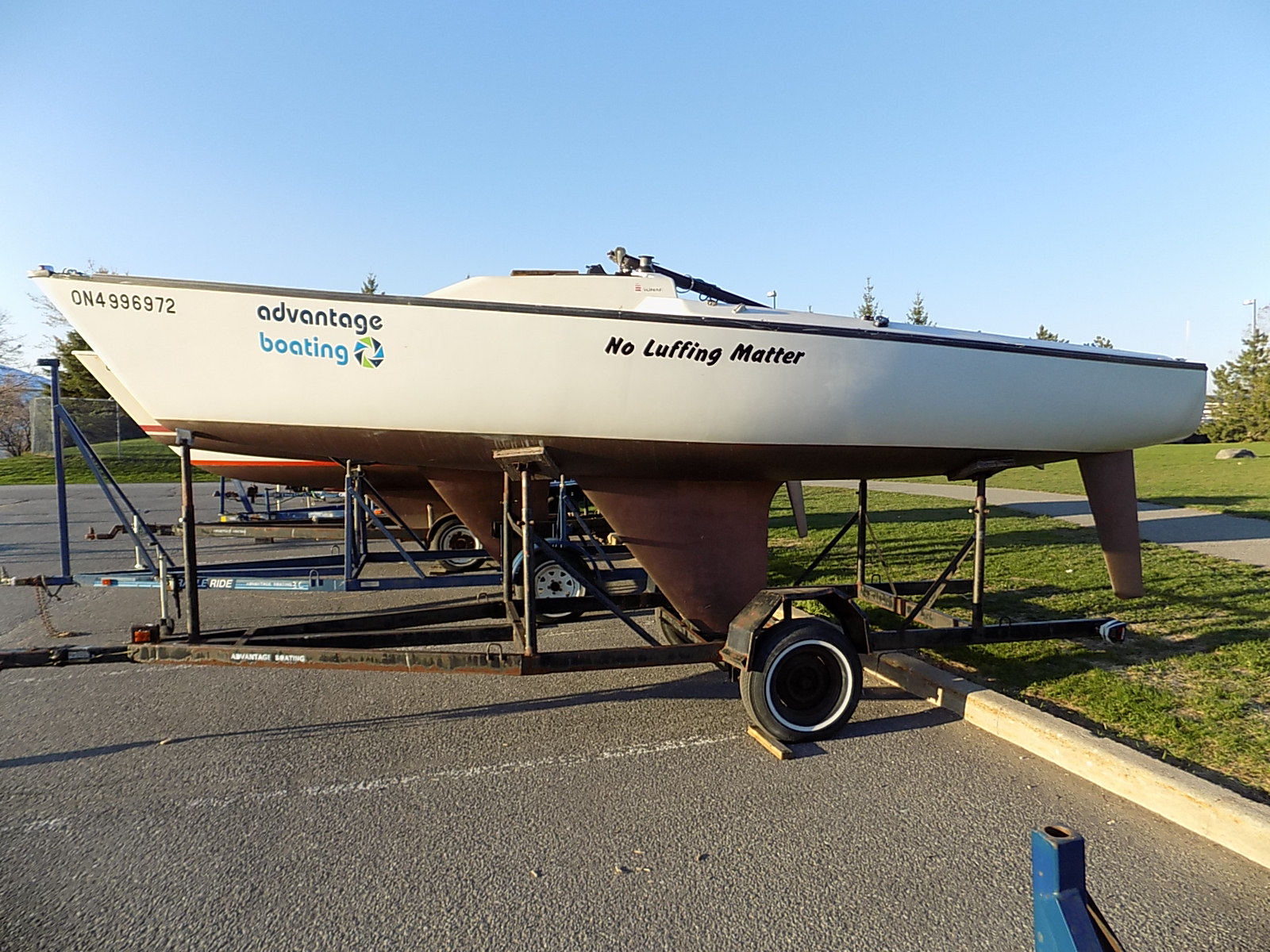
Sonar on its road trailer showing the keel and rudder shape

The Sonar is used for sail training as well as racing.

The Sonar is an accepted World Sailing international class and was selected for Paralympic sailing at the 1996 Paralympic Games and has remained a Paralympic class since then.

The boat is supported by an active class club that organizes racing events, the Sonar Class Association.

In a 1994 review Richard Sherwood wrote, "the Sonar was designed for the same market as the Etchells 22, Soling, Tempest, and Ensign. The basic concept was generated by a committee of the Noroton Yacht Club (Connecticut), then designed by Bruce Kirby. The cockpit is huge ... Only three sails are allowed — main, jib, and spinnaker."

The boat was inducted into the American Sailboat Hall of Fame in 2004. The citation noted, "the brainchild of Bruce Kirby (who also designed the Laser, which was inducted into the American Sailboat Hall of Fame in 1997), the Sonar was designed to a specific set of parameters determined through a survey of club sailors. All were looking for the same thing—a boat that was exciting to race, easy to handle by sailors of varying ages and abilities, trailerable, self-bailing and reasonably comfortable. Basically, Kirby said, "we wanted a boat that could be sailed without breaking your neck." "I think it’s the best boat I ever designed in that it met all the criteria," Kirby said."
