= Australian Paralympic Sailing Team =

Sailing was added to the Summer Paralympic Games competition schedule at the 2000 Sydney Games. Australia has been represented since 2000 Games. In 2015, the International Paralympic Committee announced that sailing would be one of two sports dropped from the summer Paralympic Games program at the 2020 Tokyo Games. The parent body for sailing internationally, World Sailing, has stated its intention to seek re-inclusion on the summer Paralympic program at the 2028 Games in Los Angeles.

== Medal table ==
| Games | Gold | Silver | Bronze | Total |
|---|---|---|---|---|
| 2000 Sydney | 1 | 0 | 0 | 1 |
| 2004 Athens | 0 | 0 | 0 | 0 |
| 2008 Beijing | 0 | 1 | 1 | 2 |
| 2012 London | 1 | 0 | 0 | 1 |
| 2016 Rio | 2 | 1 | 0 | 3 |
| Totals (5 entries) | 4 | 2 | 1 | 7 |

== Summer Paralympic Games ==
=== 2000 ===
Australia represented in sailing by:
Men – Jamie Dunross, Graeme Martin, Michael McLean, Noel Robins, Peter Thompson
Coaches - Lachlan Gilbert (2.4mR), Paul Eldrid (Sonar) Officials - John Whitfield

Australia won the gold medal in the Sonar event and finished fourth in 2.4MR. It was the second placed nation in sailing.

=== 2004 ===
Australia represented in sailing:
Men - Jamie Dunross, Colin Harrison, Jeff Milligan, Peter Thompson
Coaches – Lachlan Gilbert (Head), Geoff Chambers

Australia failed to win any medals in the two sailing events.

=== 2008 ===
Australia represented in sailing by:
Teams - Russell Boaden, Colin Harrison, Graeme Martin - 3-person keelboat Sonar; Daniel Fitzgibbon, Rachel Cox - 2-person keelboat SKUD 18; 2.4mR (single-handed) - Aaron Hill
Coaches - Greg Omay (Head Coach), Adrian Finglas Officials - Sarina Macpherson (Section Manager), Linnea Korssell, Sue Crafer, Geoff Milligan, Timothy Lowe

Three of the team made their Paralympic debut. Australia won a silver and bronze medal.

=== 2012 ===
Australia represented in sailing:
Teams - Matthew Bugg (Single person 2.4mR), Daniel Fitzgibbon and Liesl Tesch (Two person Skud 18), Colin Harrison, Stephen Churm, Jonathan Harris (Three person Sonar)
Support staff – Administration – Sarah Karsten (Section Manager), Peter Conde (Support staff); Coaches – Grant Alderson, Tim Lowe, Richard Scarr; Physiotherapist – Sarah Ross, Technical Support – Adrian Finglas, Boat Technician – Jeffery Milligan; Personal Care Attendant – Kumi Sasaki

Lisel Tesch attended her sixth Games but the first as sailor. She previously captained Australian women's wheelchair basketball team to medals at previous Games. Tesch won her first Paralympic gold medal by combining with Daniel Fitzgibbon to win Two Person Keelboat.

=== 2016 ===
Australia represented in sailing:

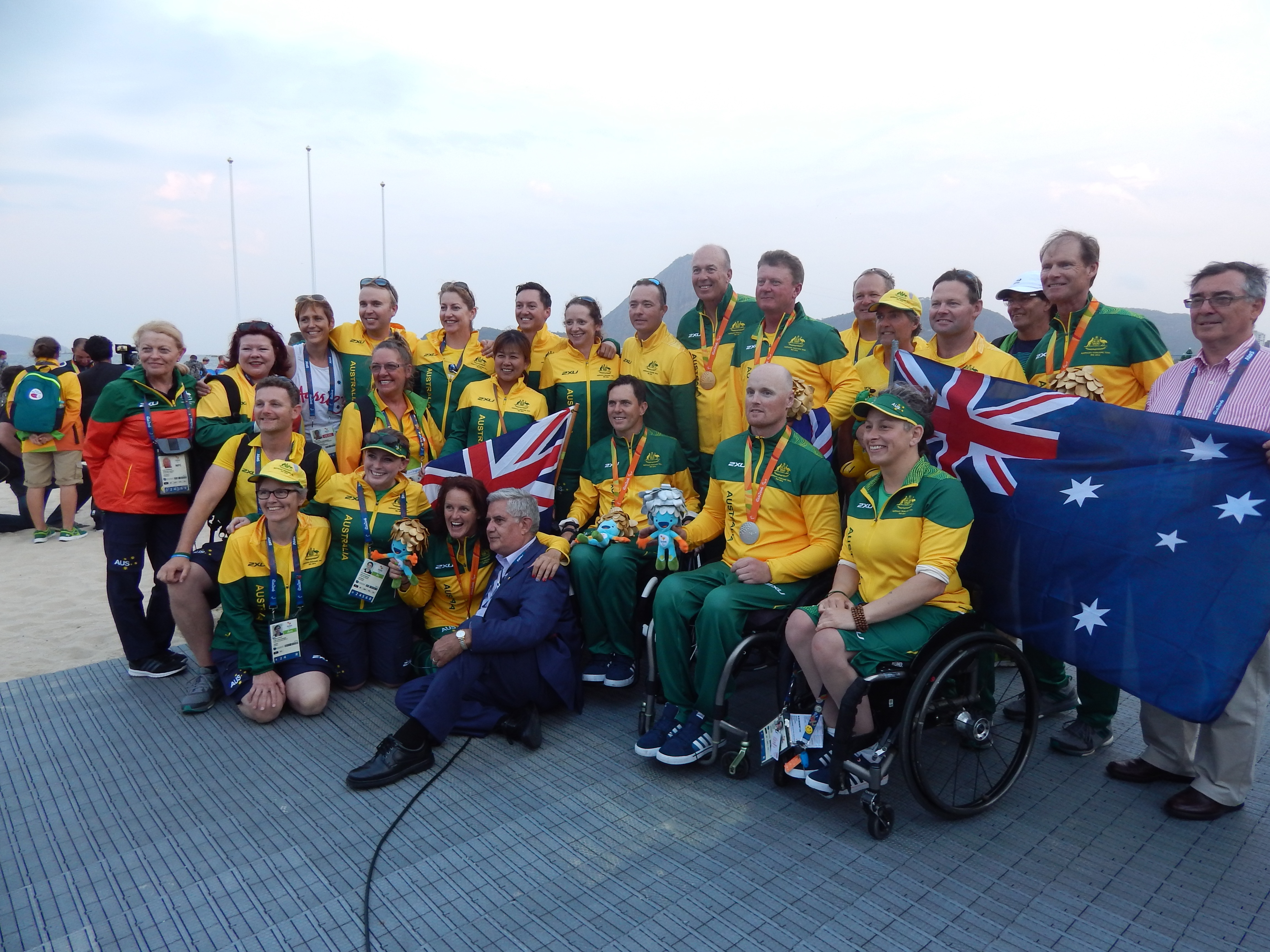
Australian Sailing Team - athletics and officials at Rio Paralympics

Teams - Matthew Bugg (Single person 2.4mR), Daniel Fitzgibbon and Liesl Tesch (Two person Skud 18), Colin Harrison, Russell Boaden, Jonathan Harris (Three person Sonar).
Support staff - Coaches - Grant Alderson, Geoff Woolley, Richard Scarr; Team Leader - Mark Robinson, Assistant Team Leader - Shellee Ferguson; Boatmen - Andrew Lechte, Tim Lowe, Physiotherapist - Sarah Ross, Carer - Ryoko Yamaguchi.

Australia one three medals - two gold medals to Daniel Fitzgibbon / Liesl Tesch (Two person Skud 18) and Colin Harrison / Russell Boaden / Jonathan Harris (Three person Sonar) and silver medal to Matthew Bugg (Single person 2.4mR).
This was the last Games for sailing has been taken off the 2020 Tokyo Games program.

== See also ==
- Sailing at the Summer Paralympics
- List of Australian Paralympic sailing medalists
- Australia at the Paralympics
