= List of Australian Paralympic sailing medalists =

Sailing was added to the 2000 Sydney Games.

Daniel Fitzgibbon and Graeme Martin have won two medals at two Games.

== Medalists ==
Medal totals as of the 2012 Games
Athlete	Gold	Silver	Bronze	Total
Daniel Fitzgibbon	1	1	0	2
Graeme Martin	1	0	1	2
Noel Robins	1	0	0	1
Jamie Dunross	1	0	0	1
Liesl Tesch	1	0	0	1
Rachel Cox	0	1	0	1
Russell Boaden	0	0	1	1
Colin Harrison	0	0	1	1

== Summer Paralympic Games ==
=== 2000 ===
Medal	Name	Event
Gold	Noel Robins, Jamie Dunross, Graeme Martin	Three person Sonar

=== 2004 ===
No medals.

=== 2008 ===
Medal	Name	Event
Silver	Daniel Fitzgibbon, Rachel Cox	2-person keelboat SKUD 18
Bronze	Russell Boaden, Colin Harrison, Graeme Martin	3-person keelboat Sonar

=== 2012 ===
Medal	Name	Event
Gold	Daniel Fitzgibbon, Liesl Tesch	2-person keelboat SKUD 18

== See also ==
- Australian Paralympic Sailing Team
