= Churm =

Churm is a surname. Notable people with the surname include:

- Sarah Churm (born 1980), English actress
- Stephen Churm (born 1954), Australian sailor
- Michael Churm, British Paralympic athlete
