= Primary Club =

UK charitable organization

The Primary Club is a charity based in Essex, England which raises money to provide sports and recreational facilities for the visually impaired. It was started in 1955 at Beckenham Cricket Club in Kent by four slightly inebriated young bachelors, depressed by their own performance with the bat. They were Mike Sheeres, Ralph Lilly, and brothers Keith Patterson & Norman Patterson. They vowed to support F R Brown's Fund for Blind Cricketers. Membership was initially limited to those out first ball in matches for or against Beckenham. In its first nine years, the Club raised £45.

Membership of The Primary Club is open to anyone who has been out first ball in any form or level of cricket (a "golden duck"). The joining fee includes a tie which by tradition is worn on the Saturday of a Test match. Female members optionally have a brooch.

Currently its 10,000 members have donated £1,778,673 to the Club. The patron of The Primary Club is Stuart Broad who succeeded Derek Underwood, who held the role from 1997 until his death in April 2024. In 2004, The Primary Club made grants in excess of £180,000 to clubs and schools for the blind throughout the United Kingdom.

In 1973, the BBC's Test Match Special team, in particular the late Brian Johnston, started to talk about the Club on the radio and members were recruited from cricket-playing countries all over the world.

In 1974, the Primary Club of Australia was founded by Australian cricket lovers. They have raised over A$5 million and donated it in the form of sporting and recreational facilities to charities which care for disabled people. The Primary Club of Australia's patron and 12th Man is Mark Taylor AO, while Jim Maxwell is the president.

== See also ==
- Primary Club of Australia
