= Jonathan Harris (sailor) =

Australian Paralympic sailor

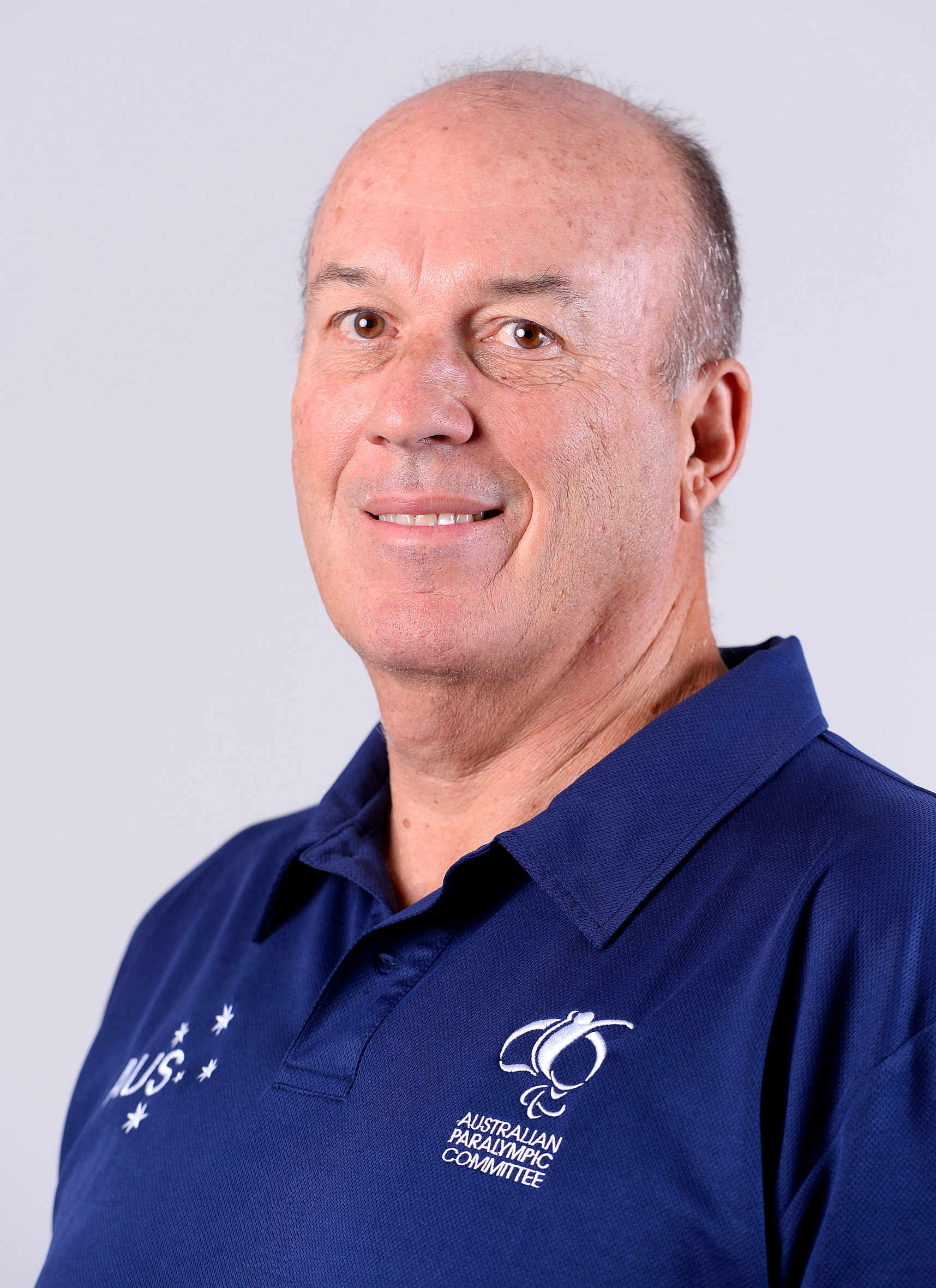
- 2016 Australian Paralympic team portrait of Harris

Personal information
- Nationality: Australian
- Born: 31 October 1955 (age 70)

Sport
- Country: Australia
- Sport: Sailing
- Event: Mixed Three Person Sonar
- Club: Cronulla Sailing Club
Medal record
Sailing
Representing Australia
Paralympic Games
Gold medal – first place	2016 Rio	Mixed Three Person Sonar
IFDS World Championships
Bronze medal – third place	2013 Kinsale	Mixed Three Person Sonar
Bronze medal – third place	2014 Halifax	Mixed Three Person Sonar
Silver medal – second place	2015 Melbourne	Mixed Three Person Sonar
Bronze medal – third place	2016 Medemblik	Mixed Three Person Sonar

Jonathan Bruce Harris OAM (born 31 October 1955) is an Australian blue-water sailor who began his sailing career when he was about ten. He won a gold medal in the Mixed Three Person Sonar the 2016 Rio Paralympics.

== Personal ==
Harris was born on 31 October 1955. He lost his hand as a result of a chemical explosion when he was sixteen. As of 2012, he lives in Oatley, New South Wales, and owns an IT company. He also skis and cycles.

== Sailing ==
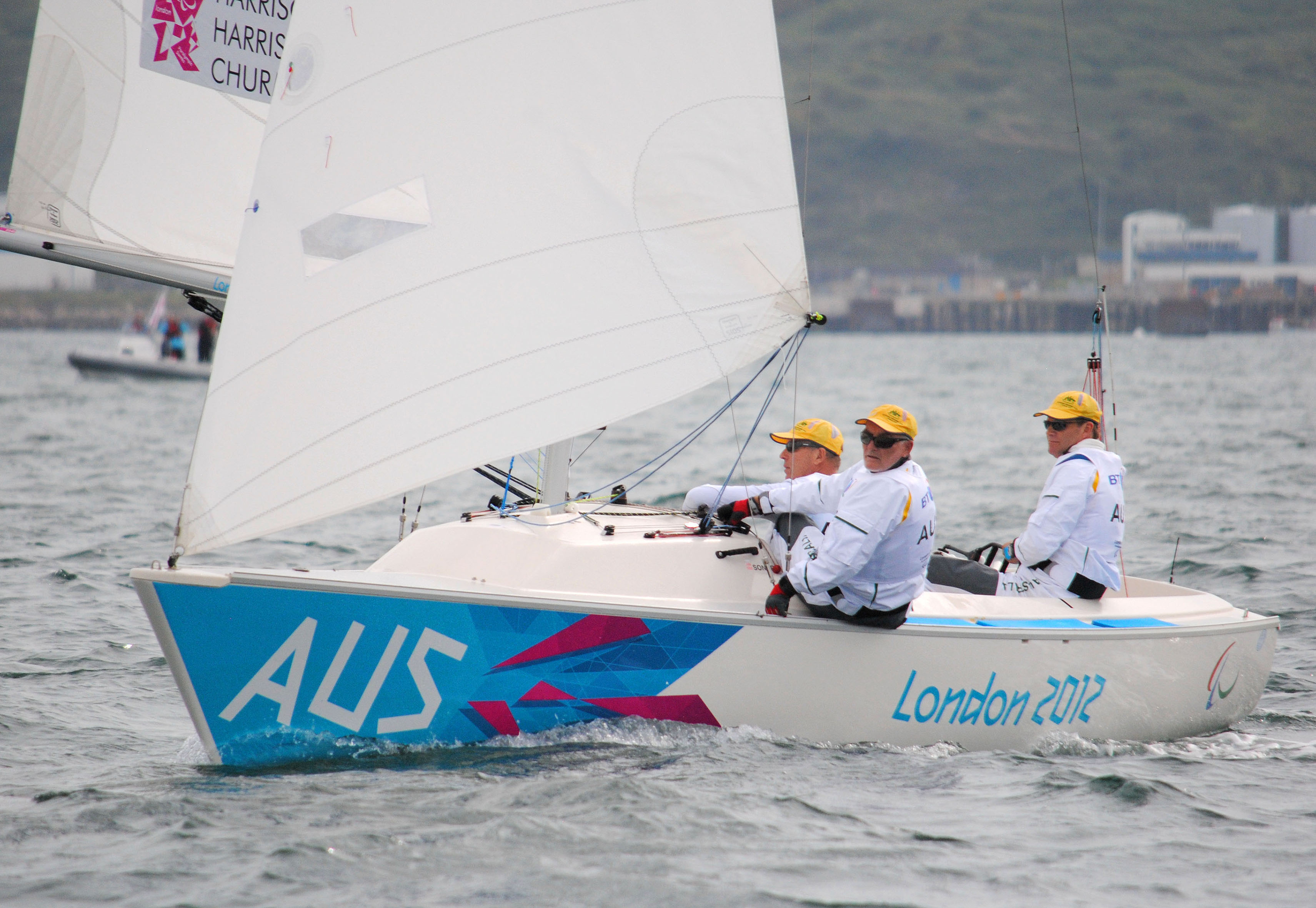
Jonathan Harris, Stephen Churm & Colin Harrison sailing at the 2012 London Paralympics

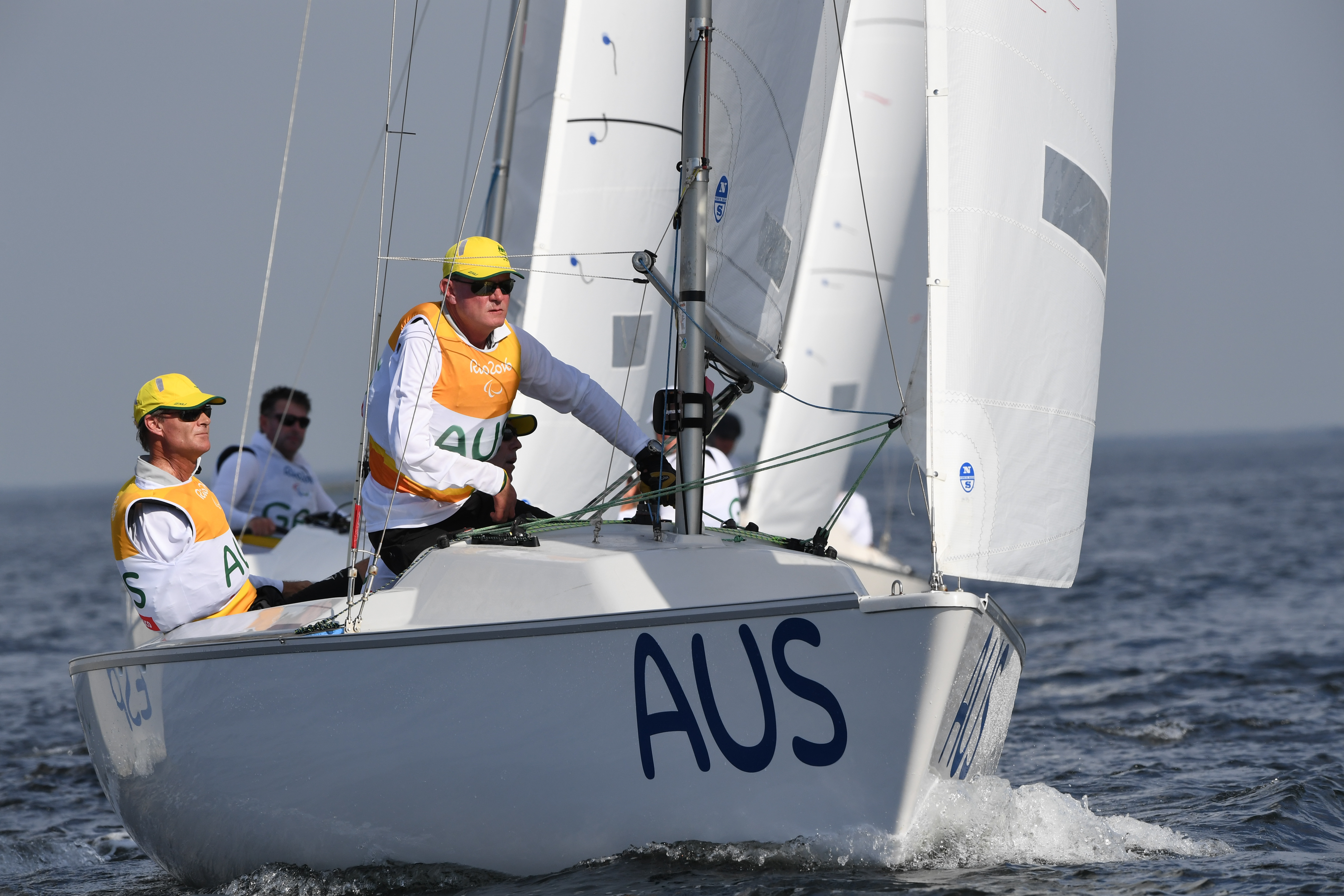
Colin Harrison, Russell Boaden, Jonathan Harris sailing at the 2016 Rio Paralympics

Harris is a sailor and has been a member of the Cronulla Sailing Club since he was very young. He is coached by the Perth-based Grant Alderson. As of 2012, he had a sailing scholarship with the New South Wales Institute of Sport.

Harris started sailing when he was about ten years old. He has twice (1983, 1985) competed in the Sydney to Hobart Yacht Race, a distance of just over 1,170 km. He first represented Australia in 2002 at the World Championships in the Netherlands, in the Sonar class. He competed with Colin Harrison and Stephen Churm for the first time at the 2012 International Association for Disabled Sailing (IFDS) World Championships in the Sonar event, where the team finished fourth. On the last day of competition, he and his crew dealt with a wind speed of 10-15 knots.

At the 2012 Dutch-hosted World Cup, Harris and his teammates finished third over all in the Sonar Paralympic class. They had been at fourth following the first day of competition. His team at the 2012 Skandia Sail for Gold Regatta in Weymouth, England, finished fifth overall following the fourth day of competition. He was selected to represent Australia at the 2012 Summer Paralympics in sailing. It was his first Paralympic selection. He did not medal.

At the 2013 IFDS World Championships in Kinsale, Ireland, he teamed with Russell Boaden and Colin Harrison to win the bronze medal in the Sonar Class. In October 2013, the trio were named Yachting Australia's Sailors of the Year with a Disability. At the 2014 IFDS World Championships in Halifax, Canada, Harris teamed with Harrison and Boaden to win the bronze medal in the Sonar Class. In November 2014, Harris shared the Yachting Australia Sailor of the Year with a Disability award with Daniel Fitzgibbon, Liesl Tesch, Colin Harrison, Russell Boaden and Matthew Bugg. The Australian team of six sailors beat Great Britain by one point at the IFDS World Championship.

At the 2015 IFDS Championships in Australia, he teamed with Boaden and Harrison to win the silver medal behind the Great Britain crew. Their score was 37.0 to Great Britain's 36.0. Harris, Boaden and Harrison won the bronze medal in the Mixed Three Person Sonar class at the 2016 World Championships held in Medemblik, Netherlands. They went on to win the gold medal in the Mixed Three Person Sonar class at 2016 Summer Paralympics. During the event they had three first placings and four second placings. He was awarded the Order of Australia Medal in 2017.
