= ABC Cricket Book =

The ABC Cricket Book is a softcover book published annually by the Australian Broadcasting Corporation which covers international and local cricket and focusses particularly on the Australian cricket team.

It was first published in 1934 and is now Australia's longest running cricket journal. The current editor is ABC cricket commentator Jim Maxwell.
