= Stephen Churm =

Australian sailor

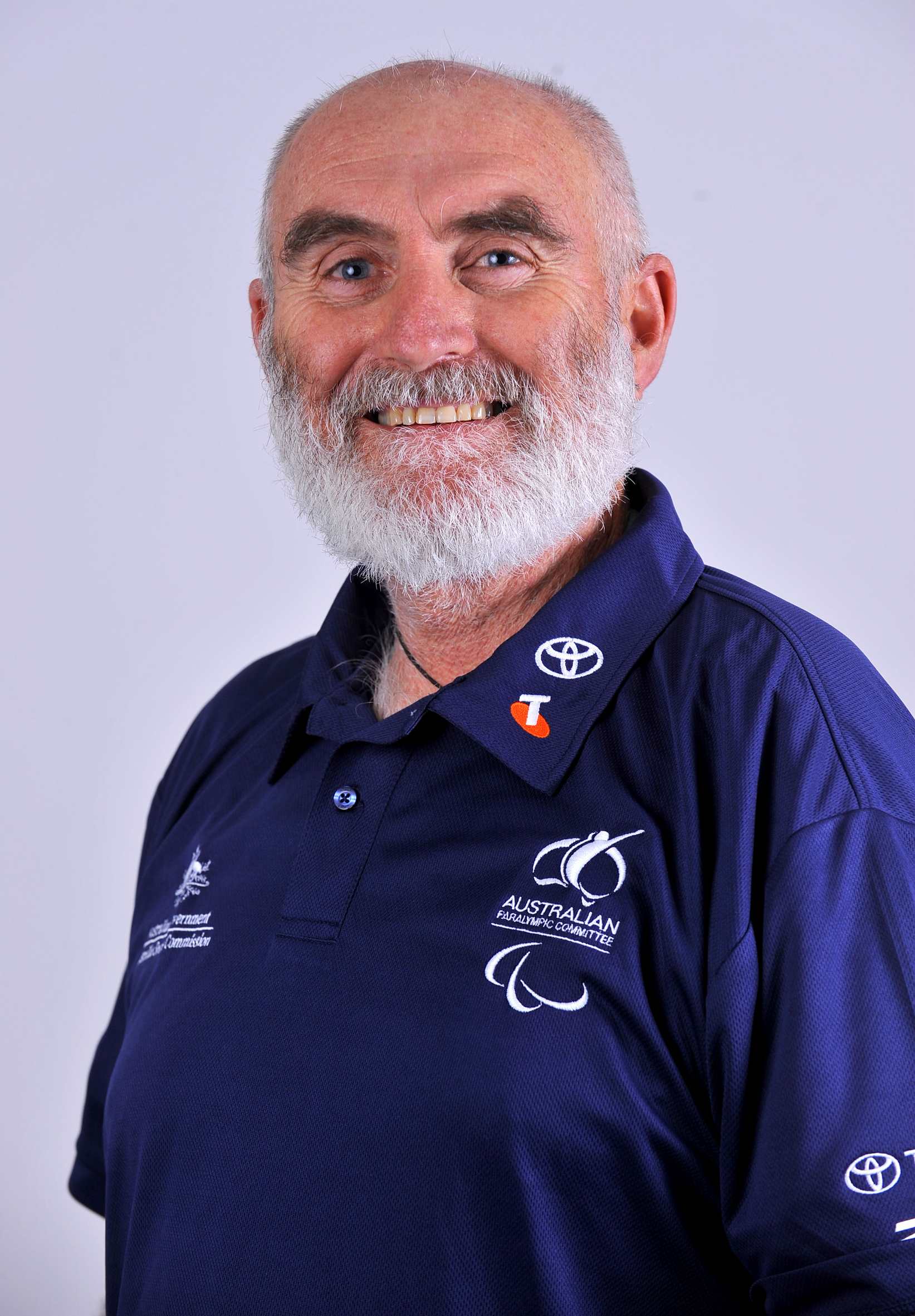
- 2012 Australian Paralympic team portrait of Churm

Personal information
- Full name: Stephen Andrew Churm
- Nationality: Australian
- Born: 16 July 1954 (age 71)

Sport
- Country: Australia
- Sport: Sailing
- Club: Sailability Rushcutters Bay Yacht Club

Stephen Andrew Churm (born 16 July 1954) is an Australian sailor. He was selected to represent Australia at the 2012 Summer Paralympics in sailing. He did not medal at the 2012 Games.

== Personal ==
Churm was born on 16 July 1954, and is from Sydney, New South Wales. He has left-sided Klumpke palsy as a result of a torn brachial plexus during birth.

Churm is married and has three children. As of 2012, he lives in Como West and is retired.

== Sailing ==
Churm is a sailor, and is a member of the Rushcutters Bay based Sailability Rushcutters Bay Yacht Club. As of 2012, he had a sailing scholarship with the New South Wales Institute of Sport.

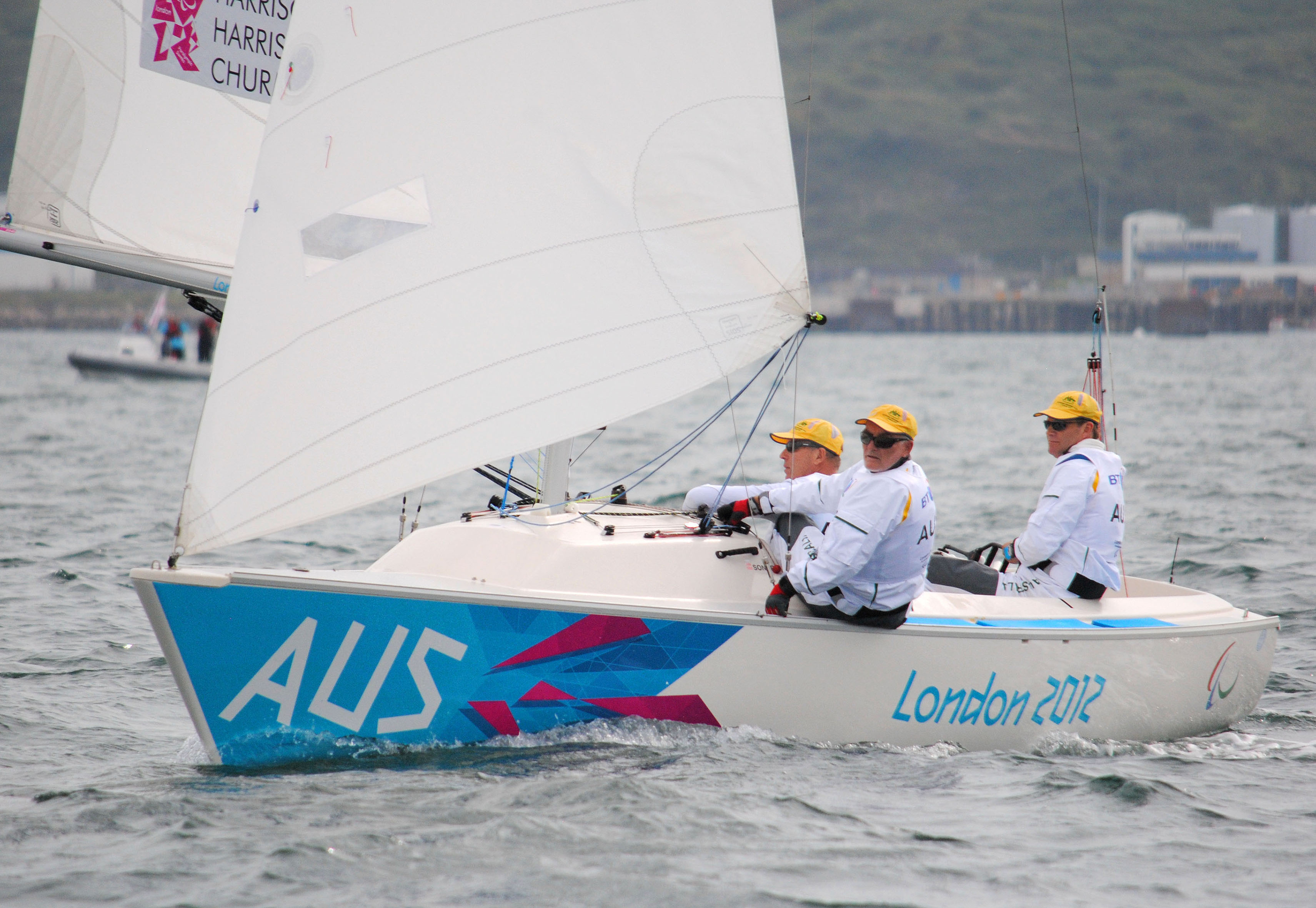
Jonathan Harris, Stephen Churm & Colin Harrison sailing at the 2012 London Paralympics

Churm started sailing in 1962 as a seven-year-old at the Connells Point Sailing Club in the Mark 1 class, racing for the first time at a club event in 1963. He won his first race in 1966 in the Conells Point SC competition when he was in the Heron ‘Mischief’. In the Heron class at the Mrs R Woods Forward hands trophy later that year, he came in first. He tried to qualify for the 2000 Summer Paralympics but just missed out on selection. He first represented Australia in 2002 at the World Championships, where he finished seventh alongside Jonathan Harris and Zoltan Pegan in Medemblink. At the 2003 Ransa Twilights, competing in the Sonar, he finished third in the second position. The following year, he finished twelfth in the third position.

Churm competed in the 2012 IFDS World Championships in the sonar event in a boat that included Colin Harrison and Jonathan Harris. It was the first time the trio had sailed together. At the 2012 Dutch-hosted World Cup, he and his teammates finished third in the Sonar Paralympic class. He competed in the Macquarie 2012 Access World Championships. He was selected to represent Australia at the 2012 Summer Paralympics in sailing. He did not medal at the 2012 Games.
