= Matthew Bugg =

Australian sailor (born 1981)

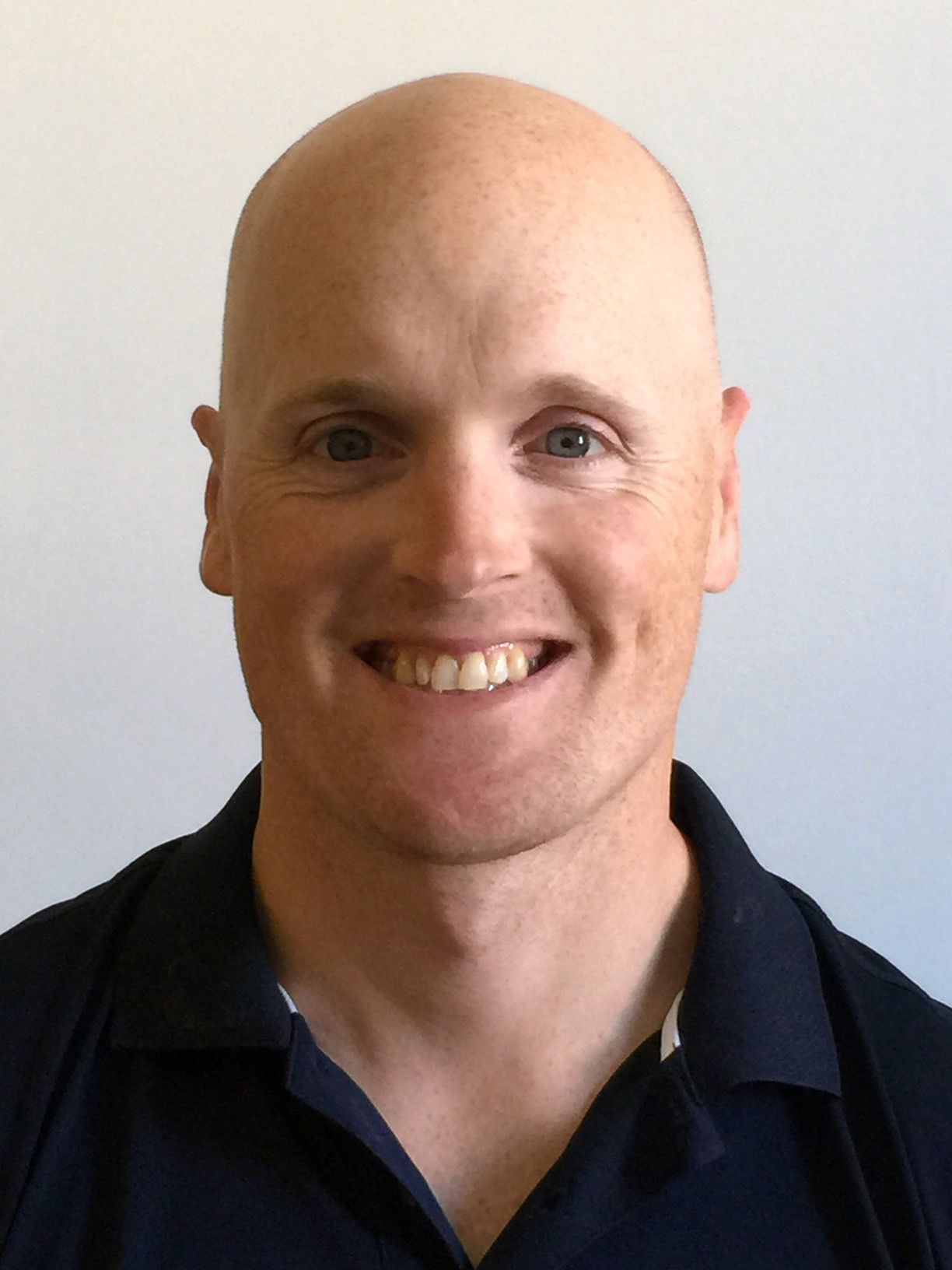
- 2016 Australian Paralympic team portrait

Personal information
- Nationality: Australian
- Born: 25 February 1981 (age 45)

Sport
- Country: Australia
- Sport: Sailing
- Event: 2.4mR class
- Club: Royal Yacht Club of Tasmania
Medal record
Sailing
Representing Australia
Paralympic Games
Silver medal – second place	2016 Rio	2.4m
IFDS World Championships
Bronze medal – third place	2015 Melbourne	2.4m
Bronze medal – third place	2016 Medemblik	2.4m

Matthew Bugg (born 25 February 1981) is an Australian sailor. He represented Australia at the 2012 Summer Paralympics in the 2.4mR class sailing event. He won a bronze medal at the 2015 IFDS World Championships. He won a silver medal in the 2.4mR at the 2016 Rio Paralympics.

== Personal ==
Bugg was born on 25 February 1981, and is from Lindisfarne, Tasmania. He is a paraplegic as a result of a snowboarding accident when he was twenty-three years old. While attending a TAFE in Australia, he earned a Certificate III course in Commercial Cooking. As of 2012, he works as a chef.

== Sailing ==
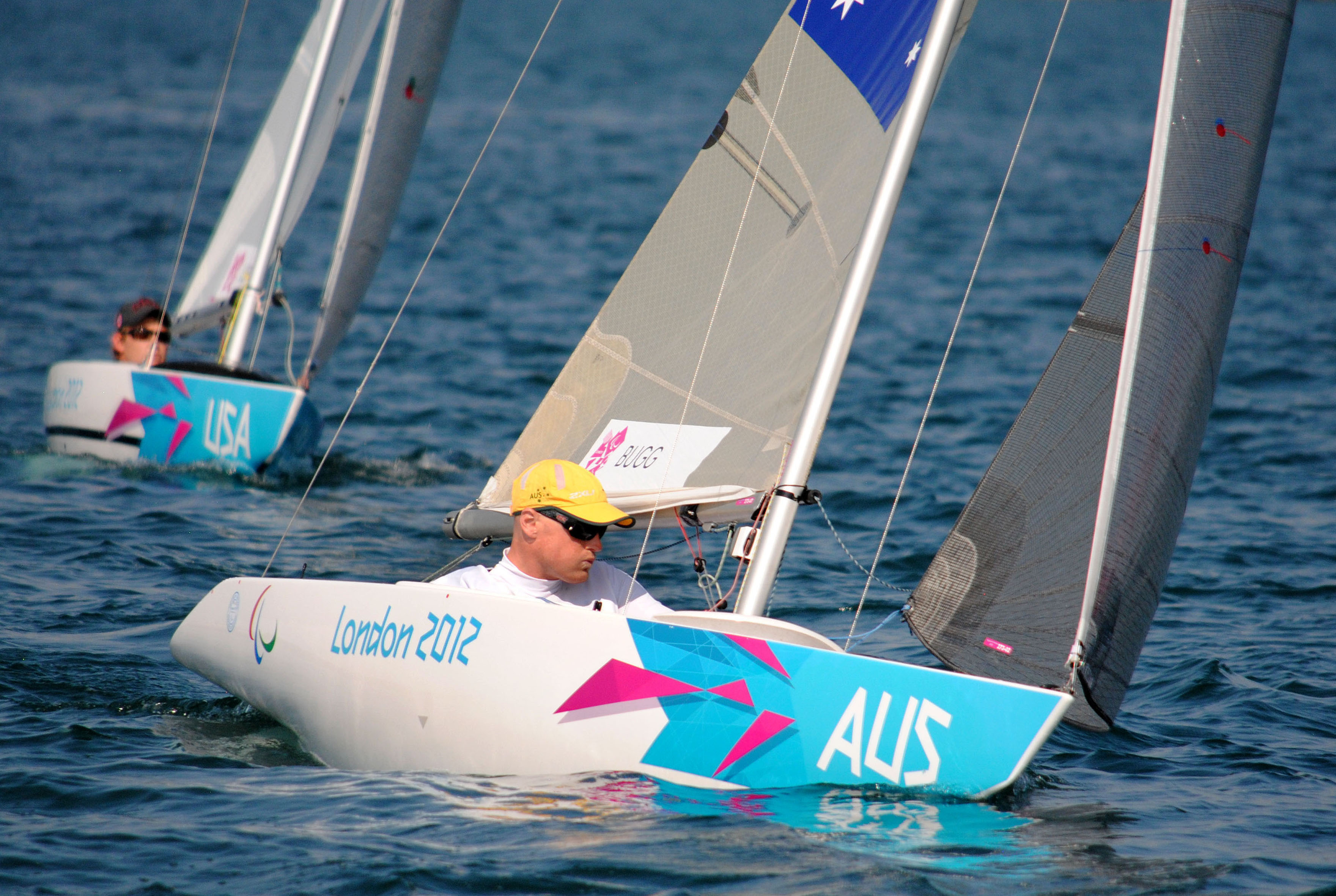
Bugg sailing at the 2012 London Paralympics

Bugg is a sailor, and is a member of the Royal Yacht Club of Tasmania. He is coached by Richard Scarr, who does double duty as the head coach of Tasmanian State Sailing Performance Program.

Bugg started sailing in 1993. He first represented Australia in 2010 at the Netherlands hosted World Cup, went on to compete in Europe with others on the Paralympic team. At the Hobart hosted 2010 national championship in the International 2.4 metre class, with sixteen points, Bugg came in fifth in his first time competing in the event. In his third race in the event, his father's boat collided with his.

At the 2011 national championship in the International 2.4 metre class, Bugg came in first. He claimed the title a month after turning 30. His title was also the first time a non-Canberran won the International 2.4 metre class at the event. His race competitors included his father and Peter Thompson who won gold in sailing at the 2000 Summer Paralympics. In May 2011, he competed in sailing events in Europe, with Yachting Australia footing part of the bill for his travels. At the 2011 world championships at Weymouth, England, he finished fifteenth. In July 2011, he was ranked fifth in the world. In 2011, Sailing Tasmania honoured him with the Sailor of the Year with a Disability Award.

Bugg competed in the 2012 IFDS World Championships, finishing eleventh overall in the 2.4mR fleet event following daily finishes of tenth, fifth and eighth. It was his third time competing in the event. Ahead of the 2012 Paralympic Games, he was a member sailing development squad and was ranked fifth in the world. He qualified for the Games in April 2012 and was officially selected to represent Australia at the 2012 Summer Paralympics in sailing in the single person 2.4m keelboat class. He was 31 years old at the Games. He did not medal at the 2012 Games. At the 2014 IFDS World Championships in Halifax, Canada, he finished fifth in 2.4mR event. In November 2014, Bugg shared the Yachting Australia Sailor of the Year with a Disability award with Daniel Fitzgibbon, Liesl Tesch, Colin Harrison, Jonathan Harris and Russell Boaden. The Australian team of six sailors beat Great Britain by one point at the IFDS World Championship.

At the 2015 IFDS World Championship in Melbourne, Australia, he won the bronze medal in the 2.4m class. In January 2016, he won the silver medal at the International 2.4mR World Championships held on Hobart’s Derwent River.

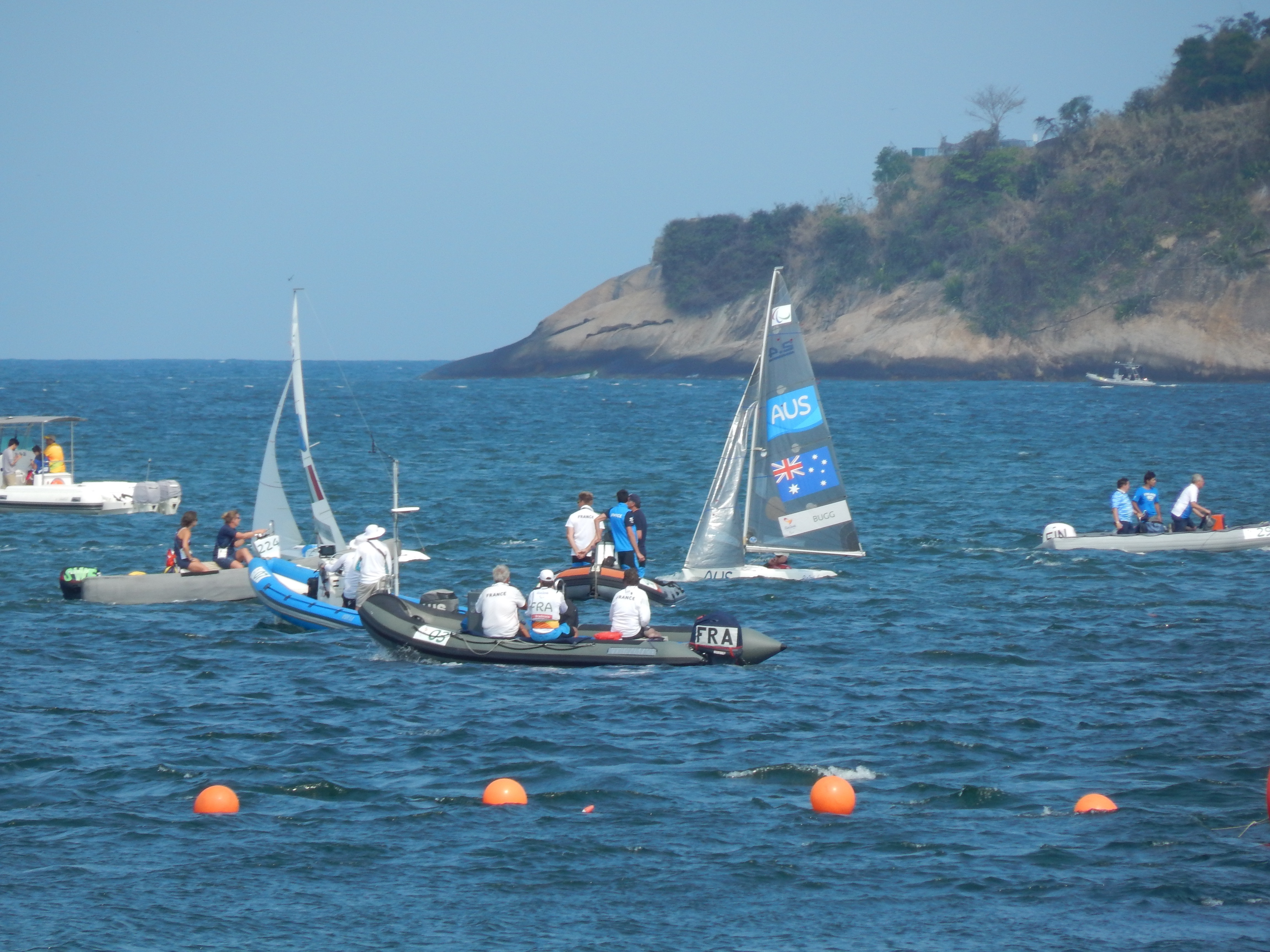
Australia's Matthew Bugg sailing at the 2016 Paralympics in Rio de Janeiro

Bugg won the bronze medal in 2.4 Norlin at the 2016 World Championships held in Medemblik, Netherlands. At the 2016 Rio Paralympics, Bugg won the silver medal in 2.4 Norlin. He was leading the event until he fell back from the gold medal position after being disqualified in race 10 of 11. Bugg's performances in 2016 led him to being named 2016 Tasmanian Athlete of the Year.
