= Primary Club of Australia =

The Primary Club of Australia
- Founded: 1974
- Founder: Jon Erby AM and Peter Howarth OAM
- Purpose: An organisation providing sporting and recreational facilities for people with disabilities.
- Location: Pennant Hills, NSW
- Members: 1000
- Key people: Mark Taylor (Patron), Jim Maxwell (President)
- Volunteers: 10+

The Primary Club of Australia Inc. is a registered charity founded in 1974 by a group of cricket lovers whose fundamental aim was to give those with disabilities the opportunity to engage in physical activity. A similar charity, "The Primary Club" was established over fifty years ago in England, where a "primary" is a first ball dismissal in cricket. In Australia a primary is called a "golden duck", as depicted on their logo.

== Fund raising ==
Monies are raised by "fining" members (as an optional donation) five dollars for every golden duck (primary) scored by an Australian player in Test matches, Limited Over One-Day and Twenty20 Cricket internationals during the previous year. Initially the fine was two dollars for every golden duck raising approximately $3000 each time an Australian batsman lost their wicket first ball.

During Ashes Cricket Series between Australia and traditional rivals England, a special challenge is made to the English Primary Club by the Twelfth Man. The challenge states that while the Australian Primary Club members pay the $10 optional donation for Australian Golden Ducks, the members will pay a $20 optional donation in tribute of each English Primary that befalls them (starting from the 2017–18 season).

The club holds sporting and social functions for members and their guests. These include golf days, a day at the races, the Annual first day of the Sydney Test match breakfasts, luncheons, dinners and cocktail parties associated with Test and One-Day International matches. In October 1981, the charity hosted a dinner that brought together every living Olympic and Paralympic Medal winner.

Members pay an annual subscription fee that covers the administrative costs of raising donations. 100% of Tax deductible donations made to the Primary Club by its members and organisations reach our charitable causes.

== The Twelfth Man ==
The Patron and Twelfth Man of The Primary Club of Australia is former Australia Cricket Captain, Mark Taylor AO. Taylor's appointment in September 2015 followed the passing of Richie Benaud OBE in April 2015. On 7 January 2016, during the lunch break of the final day of the Sydney Test Cricket Match between Australia and India, the Nine Network's The Cricket Show highlighted the Primary Club of Australia. The segment featured an interview with the Primary Club's Patron Mark Taylor as well as a brief interview with Richie Benaud's widow Daphne Benaud.

== Charitable activities ==
The Primary Club of Australia is a "charities' charity", as funds raised are made available to other registered charities to enable the purchase of sporting and recreational facilities for people with disabilities

The Primary Club of Australia's first project was to raise $90,000 for the Royal North Shore Hospital's hydrotherapy pool for disabled people.

Since then more than $5 million has been raised to date and donated to projects ranging from the purchase of Braille computers, playground equipment and balls for blind cricket to horse-riding arenas, hydrotherapy pools and specialised boats for people with disabilities.

The Primary Club of Australia awards the Sir Roden Cutler Award named after the original Patron of The Primary Club of Australia, to acknowledge an outstanding sporting achievement by an Australian disabled athlete or administrator who has performed an extraordinary service to his/her sport on behalf of people with disabilities. As part of the award, the awardee receives a grant of $20,000 for recreational facilities for the sport of his/her choosing.

Past recipients of the Sir Roden Cutler Award include: James Pittar (Swimming) 1999, Zoltan Peglar (Yachting) 2000, Michael Milton (Skiing) 2001, Julie Higgins (Equestrian) 2002, Ben Felten (Rowing) 2003, Jan Pike (Equestrian) 2004, Kurt Fearnley (Wheelchair Marathon) 2006, Brad Dubberley (Wheelchair Rugby) 2009, Ame Barnbrook (Sailing) 2011, Jessica Gallagher (Skiing) 2013 and Liesl Tesch (Sailing and Basketball) 2014.

== Marathon Cricket ==
The Primary Club of Australia holds its signature event, Marathon Cricket, annually at the Sydney Cricket Ground. Highlight of the event has been the playing of the "Jack Marsh Cup". In 2010, in the first match of its kind, a team of Indigenous rugby league players, captained by Preston Campbell of the Gold Coast Titans, played a side drawn from Cricket Australia's youth indigenous squad in a Twenty20 match.

In 2014, the "Jack Marsh Cup" was played between a Multicultural Team of Asylum Seekers and an Indigenous Australian side.

In February 2016, Marathon Cricket returned to the Sydney Cricket Ground over two days. The highlight of the event were cricket matches featuring the Maasai Cricket Warriors versus the Sydney Swans AFL team.
