= Liesl Tesch =

Australian athlete and politician

Liesl Tesch AM MP
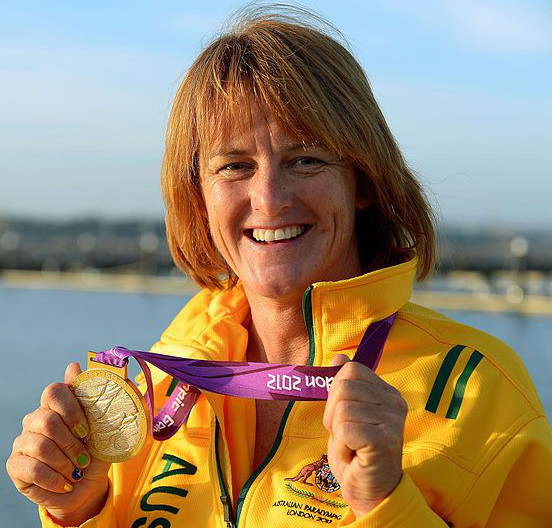
- Tesch celebrates at the 2012 London Paralympics with her gold medal

Member of the New South Wales Legislative Assembly for Gosford
- Incumbent
- Assumed office 8 April 2017
- Preceded by: Kathy Smith

Parliamentary Secretary for Disability Inclusion, Families and Communities
- Incumbent
- Assumed office 26 April 2023
- Minister: Kate Washington
- Premier: Chris Minns
- Preceded by: Melinda Pavey (as Parliamentary Secretary for Stronger Communities and Families, and the North Coast)

Personal details
- Born: Liesl Dorothy Tesch; 17 May 1969 (age 57) Brisbane, Queensland
- Party: Labor
- Occupation: Politician, Paralympian
- Sports career
Medal record
Wheelchair basketball
Paralympic Games
Silver medal – second place	2000 Sydney	Women's wheelchair basketball
Silver medal – second place	2004 Athens	Women's wheelchair basketball
Bronze medal – third place	2008 Beijing	Women's wheelchair basketball
Sailing
Paralympic Games
Gold medal – first place	2012 London	Mixed Two Person Sailing SKUD18
Gold medal – first place	2016 Rio	Mixed Two Person Sailing SKUD18
IFDS World Championships
Bronze medal – third place	2014 Weymouth	Mixed Two Person Sailing SKUD18
Gold medal – first place	2014 Halifax	Mixed Two Person Sailing SKUD18
Gold medal – first place	2015 Melbourne	Mixed Two Person Sailing SKUD18
Bronze medal – third place	2016 Medemblik	Mixed Two Person Sailing SKUD18

Liesl Dorothy Tesch AM (born 17 May 1969) is an Australian wheelchair basketball player, sailor, and politician. She is a Labor Party member of the New South Wales Legislative Assembly, representing Gosford since the 2017 Gosford state by-election.

Tesch became an incomplete paraplegic after a mountain bike accident at the age of 19. She competed in her national wheelchair basketball team at five paralympics, winning three medals, and was the first woman to play the sport professionally. She took up sailing in 2010, winning gold medals at the 2012 London and 2016 Rio Paralympics with partner Daniel Fitzgibbon.

== Early life ==
Tesch was born in Brisbane on 17 May 1969. In a 2012 interview, she described her parents as "alternative" and said of her father that he would have rather philosophised than worked "because he didn't like working for a capitalist society. ... We lived off the land as much as we could, eating roadkill." She grew up in Brisbane, New Zealand, and the Lake Macquarie suburb of Coal Point, and attended Toronto High School. She participated in basketball, swimming, sailing, windsurfing, and cycling as a child, and was part of the state basketball team in years 11 and 12 at high school. At the age of 19, she broke her back after a mountain-bike accident, becoming an incomplete paraplegic. She received a Bachelor of Science and a Diploma of Education from the University of Newcastle.

== Competitive career ==
=== Wheelchair basketball ===
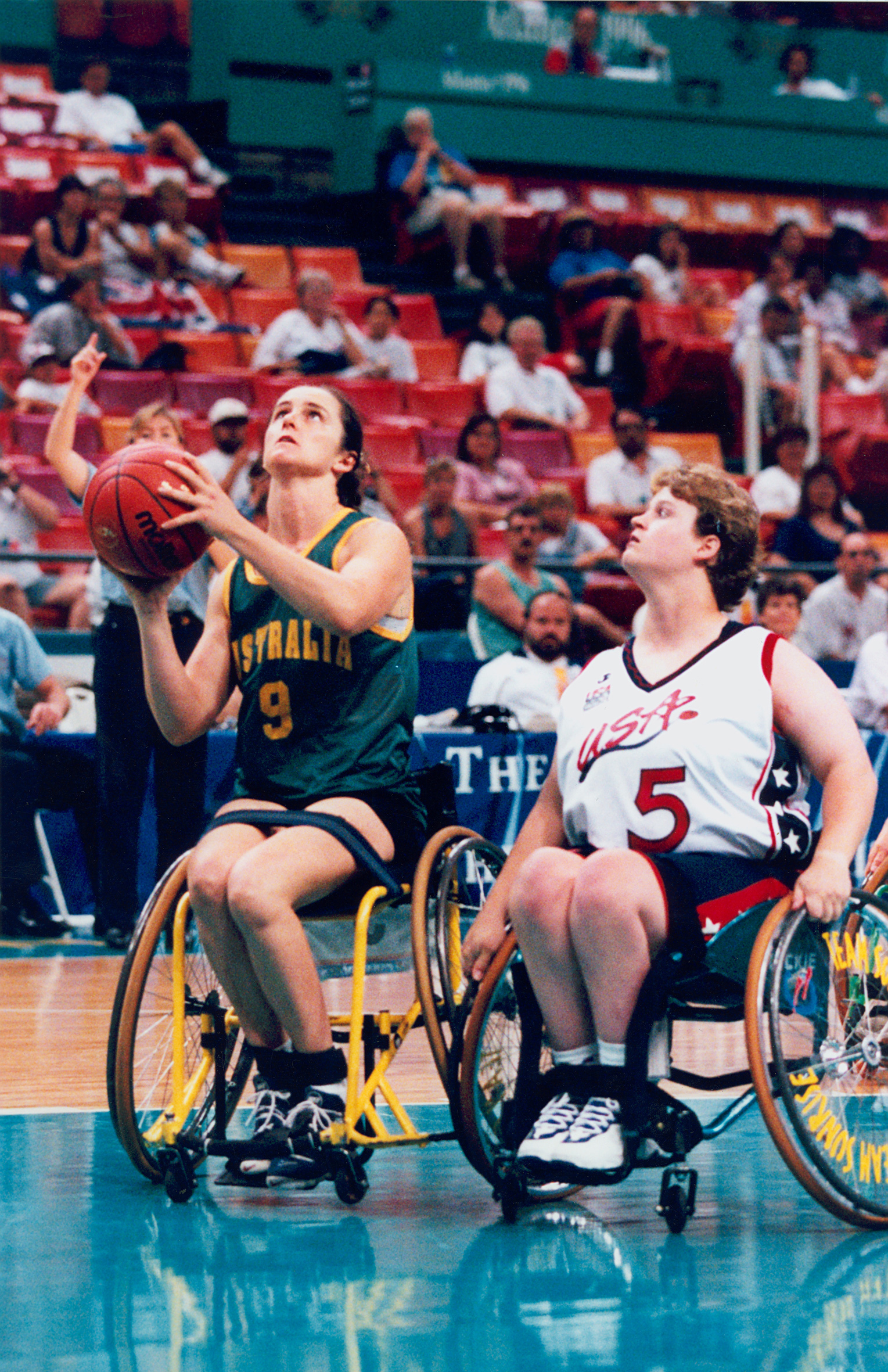
Tesch shoots from inside the key in the game against USA at the 1996 Atlanta Paralympics.

I have no doubt that my life has changed – it's hard to say for the better because of this catastrophe thing – but I definitely take lots of opportunities now because they're there. I think if I would have had this accident in other countries in the world there's a good chance I would have been dead, even, so every day I pack stuff in because I can. I have to have my head on and my mind open.

— Liesl Tesch

Tesch started playing wheelchair basketball after one of her physiotherapists noticed how skilled she was at shooting with a foam basketball and perspex backboard during her rehabilitation. Shortly after entering the New South Wales state team, she was invited to try out for and made the Australia women's national wheelchair basketball team in 1990, making her national debut at that year's World Championships and her Paralympic debut at the 1992 Barcelona Games. She was named to the All Star Five at the 1994 Gold Cup, where the Australian team won a bronze medal. She was part of the Australian team at the 1996 Atlanta Paralympics, and was named Most Valuable Player at the 1998 Gold Cup. She was the vice-captain of her country's team at the 2000 Sydney Paralympics, where she won a silver medal. During celebrations after the games, some players from Europe invited her to play in professional men's teams there. She accepted this suggestion, and played in Madrid, Sardinia, and Paris for the next five years, thus becoming the first woman in the world to play wheelchair basketball professionally. She helped establish a women's wheelchair basketball league on the continent and competed in women's teams in Italy and France. She also competed in the silver medal-winning Australian team at the 2004 Athens Paralympics. She returned home to captain the national squad at the 2008 Beijing Paralympics. In 2010, Tesch competed with her team in the Osaka Cup, a competition for the top five women's international wheelchair basketball teams in the world; her team defeated the number one ranked American team 55–37. She was a 4-point player. She retired from the national wheelchair basketball squad in 2011 to concentrate on sailing.

She admires Dawn Fraser, describing her as "a fellow bad girl not afraid to speak her mind". At the Beijing Paralympics, she smuggled a turtle that she had bought at a market into the Paralympic village, and named it "Tibet" after being ordered to remove it. She was famous for dyeing her hair green and gold during her Paralympic wheelchair basketball career.

=== Sailing ===
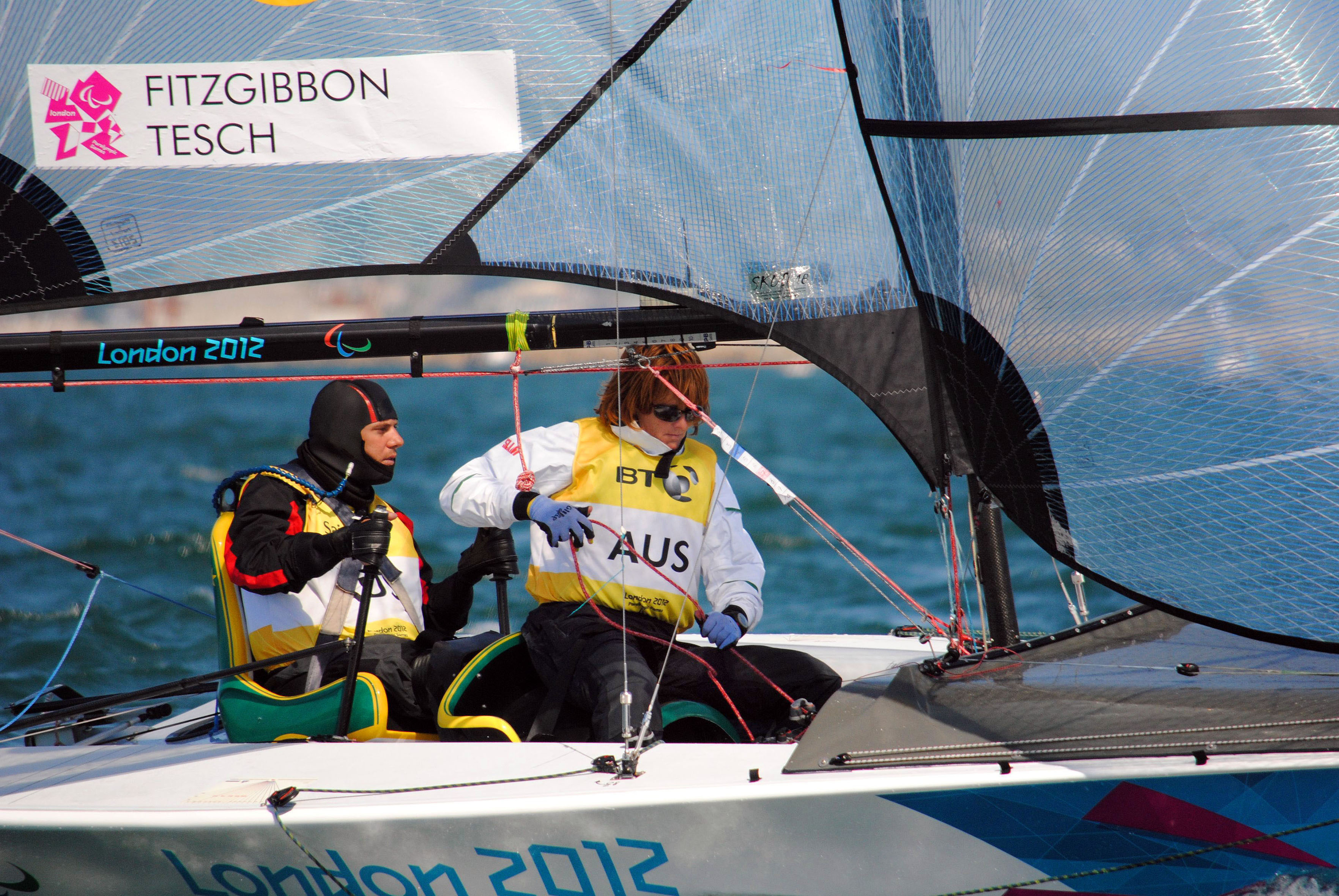
Tesch and Fitzgibbon at the 2012 London Paralympics

Tesch participated in the 2009 Sydney to Hobart Yacht Race on Sailors with Disabilities. After seeing an SBS documentary about the journey, Beijing silver medallist Daniel Fitzgibbon contacted her in late 2010 and they formed a sailing partnership. Sailing the two-person SKUD 18 with Fitzgibbon, the team had immediate success, winning gold at the ISAF Gold Cup in January 2011 and a bronze medal at the IFDS World Championships in July of that year. They won a gold medal with a race to spare at the London 2012 Paralympic sailing competition held at Weymouth and Portland. Tesch's mother had died of cancer after her first day of racing at the games; shortly after winning the gold medal, she said it was "a beautiful way to celebrate my mum's life to win gold on a beautiful sunny day at the Paralympic Games".

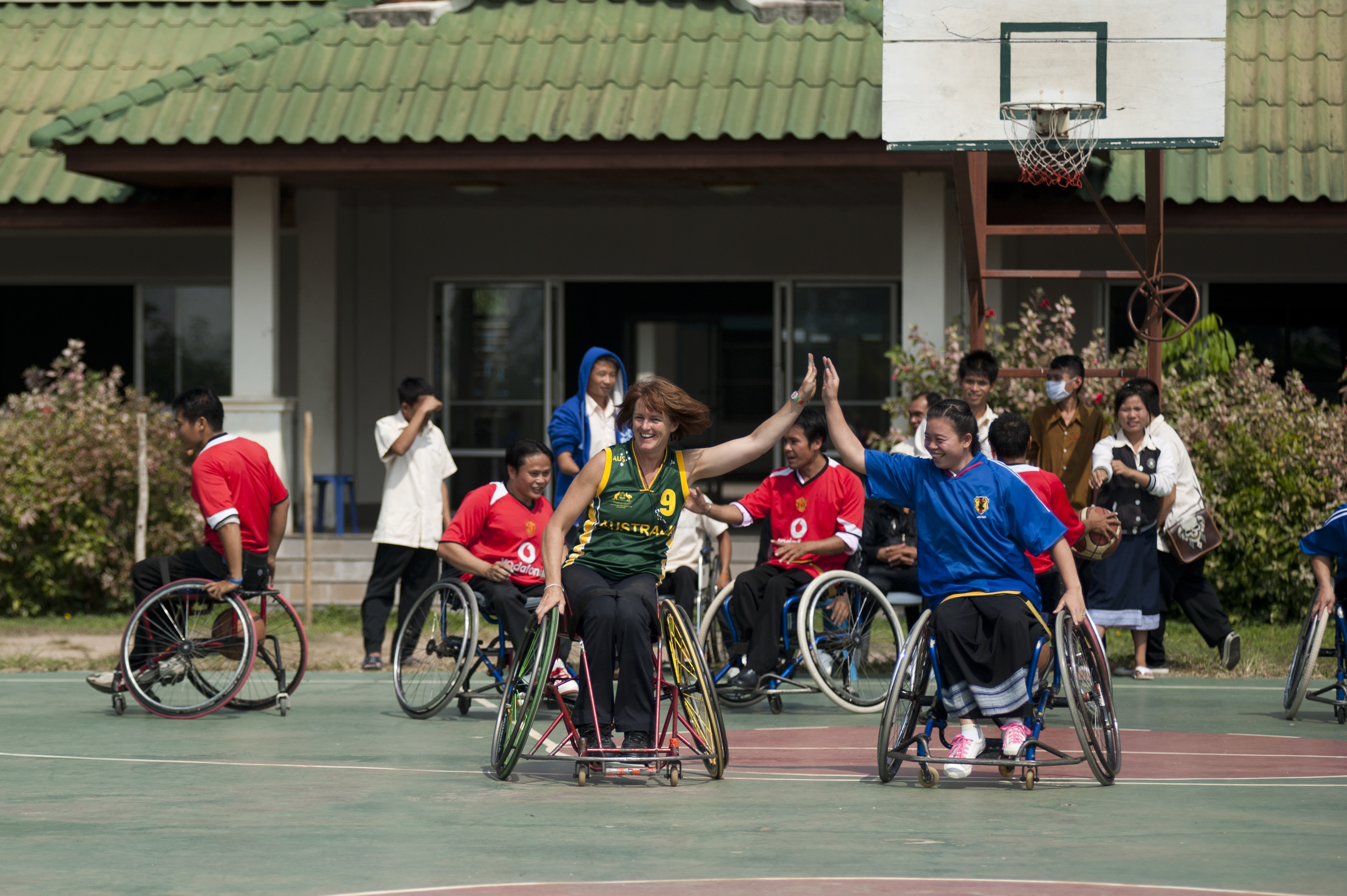
Tesch conducting wheelchair basketball clinics in Vientiane, Laos (2010)

At the 2014 IFDS World Championships in Halifax, Canada, Tesch teamed with Fitzgibbon to win the two-person SKUD 18 class. Tesch and Fitzgibbon won the 2015 IFDS World Championships in Melbourne. Tesch and Fitzgibbon won the bronze medal in the SKUD 18 class at the 2016 World Championships held in Medemblik, Netherlands.

On 20 June 2016, Tesch was robbed of her bicycle at gunpoint while on a fitness ride with her physiotherapist in Rio de Janeiro, in preparation for that year's Paralympics. She was uninjured but shaken after the attack. Tesch and Fitzgibbon won back to back Paralympic gold medals by winning the SKUD18 at the 2016 Rio Paralympics. They won eight out of 11 races and came second in the other three.

=== Ice hockey ===
Tesch is part of the Australian team for the 2026 Women's World Para Ice Hockey Championships in the New South Wales city of Newcastle.

== Political career ==
In February 2017, Tesch was selected by the Labor Party to contest the Gosford state by-election. The New South Wales Legislative Assembly electorate of Gosford had been held by the Labor Party's Kathy Smith, who had resigned due to ill health. Tesch won the election, held on 8 April 2017.

Following the election of the Minns government at the 2023 New South Wales state election, Tesch was appointed as Parliamentary Secretary for Disability Inclusion, Families and Communities.

== Personal life ==
Before entering politics, Tesch worked as a high school teacher.

In 2010, she co-founded Sports Matters, a charity that promotes sport for people with disabilities in developing countries.

She lives with her partner, Mark, a boatbuilder and frequent competitor in the Sydney to Hobart Yacht Race; the couple met while preparing for the competition in 2009.

== Recognition ==
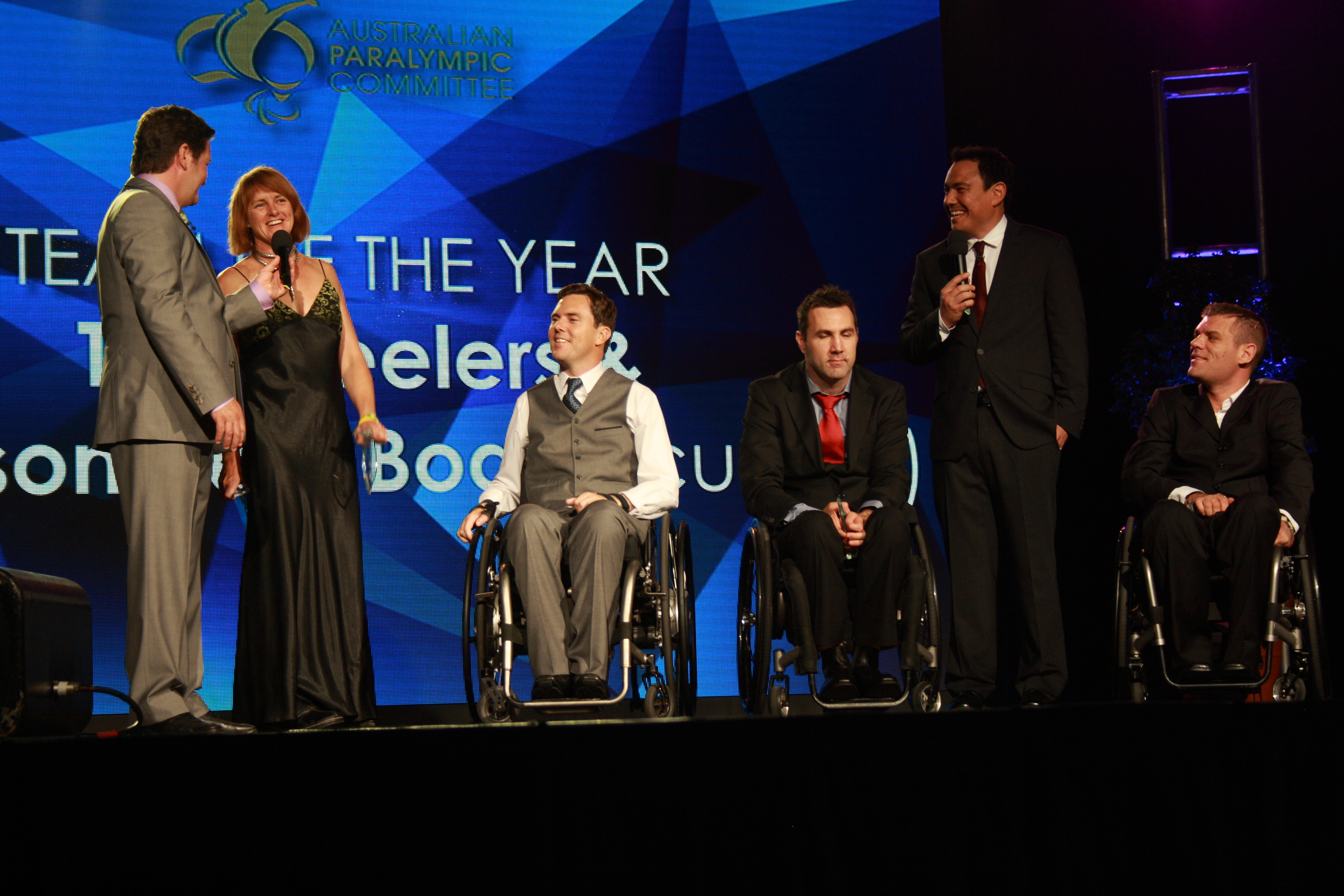
Tesch and Fitzgibbon receiving the Team of the Year award at the 2012 Australian Paralympian of the Year ceremony

In 2000, Tesch received an Australian Sports Medal. She and Fitzgibbon were jointly named as Sailors of the Year with a Disability in 2011. She was appointed a Member of the Order of Australia in the 2014 Australia Day Honours "for significant service to sport as a gold medallist at the London 2012 Paralympic Games, and through the promotion and facilitation of sport for people with disabilities." In 2014, Tesch shared the Yachting Australia Sailor of the Year with a Disability award with Daniel Fitzgibbon, Colin Harrison, Jonathan Harris, Russell Boaden and Matthew Bugg. The Australian team of six sailors beat Great Britain by one point at the IFDS World Championship. Tesch and Fitzgibbon won the 2014 NSW Sports Award for Team of the Year with a Disability. In 2014, Tesch was awarded The Primary Club of Australia's Sir Roden Cutler Award acknowledging an outstanding sporting achievement by an athlete with a disability. In 2015, Tesch and Fitzgibbon were awarded Yachting Australia's 2015 Sailor of the Year with a Disability. In 2016, Tesch was inducted into Basketball Australia's Hall of Fame. In 2016, she was awarded the President's Award at the Australian Sailing Awards. At the 2016 Australian Paralympic Committee awards, she was awarded the Uncle Kevin Coombs Medal for the Spirit of The Games. In 2017, Tesch and Daniel Fitzgibbon were inaugural inductees to the Australian Sailing Hall of Fame. In 2022, she was inducted into the New South Wales Hall of Champions.

In 2024, she was inducted into the Sport Australia Hall of Fame.

New South Wales Legislative Assembly
Preceded by Kathy Smith	Member for Gosford; 2017–present	Incumbent
