= Jim Maxwell (commentator) =

Australian sports commentator (born 1950)

James Edward Maxwell AM (born 28 July 1950) is a sports commentator with the Australian Broadcasting Corporation best known for covering cricket.

== Playing career ==
Maxwell played cricket in Sydney at the Cranbrook School and toured with an Australian Old Collegians team in 1972.

== Broadcasting and publishing ==
In 1973 Maxwell joined the ABC after two unsuccessful attempts. Initially working as trainee, he later moved on to sports commentary and is best known for his coverage of Australian cricket. He has provided radio commentary for around 340 Test Matches (as at 5th Test, Australia v India Sydney 2025) and numerous One Day Internationals, including seven World Cups.

Since the 1983 World Cup in England, Maxwell has been a frequent member of the BBC's Test Match Special team and first commentated on an overseas Ashes tour in 2001. This became a regular fixture in 2005 and his description of England's dramatic win in the Second Test at Edgbaston that year was both highly memorable and much-admired by colleagues. A sound clip of Maxwell depicting the dismissal of Sir Andrew Strauss by Shane Warne in the first innings of same match was one of five selected to play over the theme music of Test Match Special podcasts during the 2019 Ashes series. In his youth, Maxwell grew up listening to celebrated cricket commentators such as Australian Alan McGilvray and Englishman John Arlott, both of whom he greatly respected. His own unique style – at once inflective and laconic – is built upon the authoritative approach of the former with poetic touches reminiscent of the latter, displaying also a wry sense of humour. He has covered a number of sports in addition to cricket, including rugby union, rugby league, golf, hockey and table tennis. He has been involved in radio coverage of at least three Olympic Games and also provided commentary for the EA Sports games Cricket 2004 and Cricket 2005 alongside fellow broadcaster Richie Benaud.

Maxwell has edited the ABC Cricket Book since 1988 and has written or compiled several cricket books:

- The ABC Cricket Book: The First 60 years (1994). ISBN 0-7333-0406-0
- Stumps : Sledging, Slogging, Scandal, Success – The Way I See It (2001), an anecdotal account of experiences following the Australian cricket team in 2000–01. ISBN 1-74064-038-1
- The Ashes from Bodyline to Waugh: 70 Years of the ABC Cricket Book (2002). ISBN 0-7333-1192-X

The Sound of Summer, a memoir, was published in 2016. ISBN 978 1 74237 082 8

Maxwell was awarded a Lifetime Achievement Award by Sport Australia in 2020.

On 12 December 2021, Maxwell was inducted to the Sydney Cricket Ground Media Hall of Honour, alongside 11 others added to the inaugural 15 media personalities who were first celebrated in 2014.

== Personal life ==
Maxwell has two sons from his first marriage, Hamish and Oliver, which ended in 2007. He is a keen amateur photographer. On BBC Test Match Special on 25 August 2013 it was announced that Maxwell had proposed to his girlfriend during the fifth Test of the 2013 Ashes. He married Jennifer Kirkby in March 2014. The wedding was held at the SCG.

Since 2009 Maxwell has been the president of the Primary Club of Australia, a cricketing-based charity providing sporting and recreational facilities for people with disabilities. Since 2013 he has also been President of Eastern Suburbs Cricket Club.

In 2016 Maxwell was taken to hospital after becoming ill during a broadcast of the Rio Olympic Games. In a subsequent conversation with BBC Test Match Special cricket commentator Jonathan Agnew, Maxwell stated that his voice is fine but as a result of a stroke, the use of his right hand has become a problem. He has a lifetime interest in horse racing and has been a part owner of various thoroughbreds, including Mr Hurley, Kind Heart, The Big Bomber, Our Mantra, Poldark, Innisbrook and Diana Rocks.

== See also ==
- List of cricket commentators
