= Daniel Fitzgibbon =

Australian Paralympic sailor

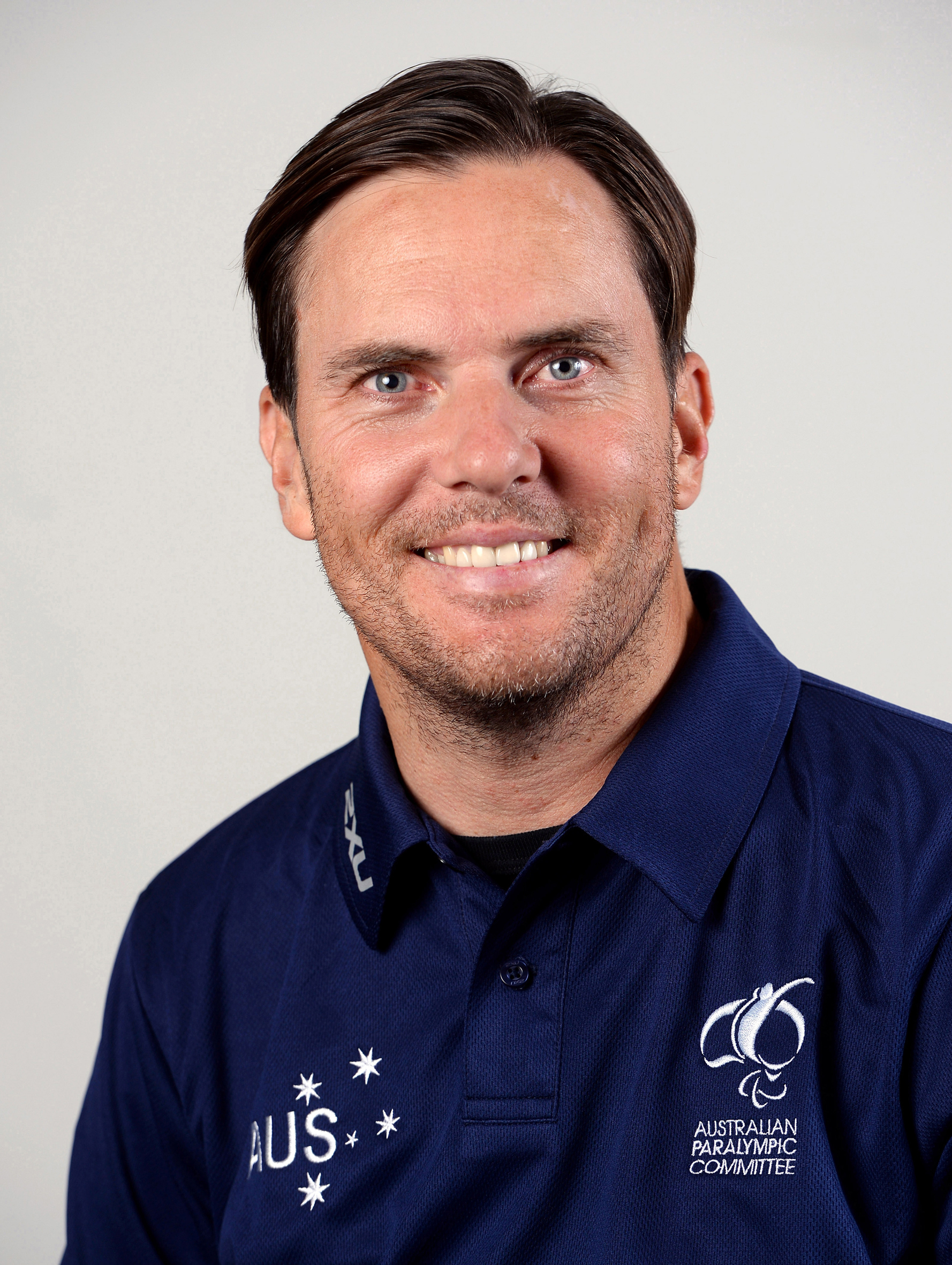
- Australian Paralympic team portrait 2016

Personal information
- Nationality: Australian
- Born: 15 June 1976 (age 50) Manly, Queensland, Australia
Medal record
Sailing
Representing Australia
Paralympic Games
Gold medal – first place	2012 London	Mixed Two Person SKUD 18
Gold medal – first place	2016 Rio	Mixed Two Person SKUD 18
Silver medal – second place	2008 Beijing	Mixed Two Person SKUD 18
IFDS World Championships
Gold medal – first place	2004 Melbourne	Single-Person Dinghy
Gold medal – first place	2014 Halifax	Mixed Two Person SKUD 18
Gold medal – first place	2015 Melbourne	Mixed Two Person SKUD 18
Bronze medal – third place	2011 Weymouth	Mixed Two Person SKUD 18
Bronze medal – third place	2016 Medemblik	Mixed Two Person SKUD 18

Daniel Fitzgibbon, OAM (born 15 June 1976) is an Australian Paralympic sailor, who won a silver medal at the 2008 Summer Paralympics in Beijing. He won gold medals at the 2012 London and 2016 Rio Paralympics with partner Liesl Tesch in the two person SKUD 18.

== Biography ==
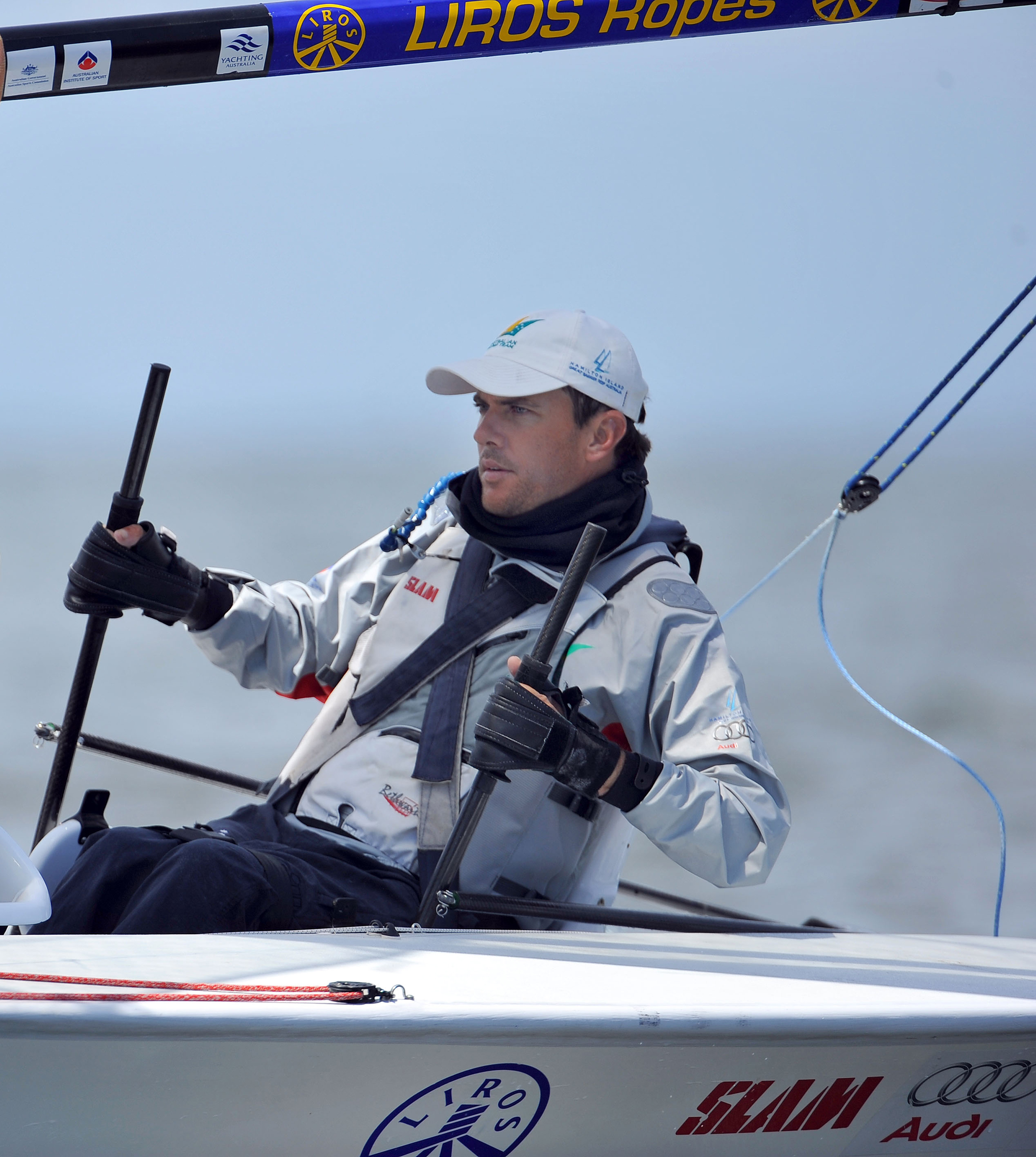
Fitzgibbon sailing at the ISAF Sailing World Cup

Daniel Gerard Fitzgibbon was born in the Brisbane suburb of Manly on 15 June 1976. Having sailed since the age of five, he joined the Royal Queensland Yacht Squadron in 1990. On 29 March 1997, an incident occurred at the Middle Harbour Yacht Club jetty in which he broke his neck, leaving him a quadraplegic. He sued the Waterways Authority for negligence at the New South Wales Supreme Court. Fitzgibbon, who claimed that he was pushed into the water, stated that it was their failure to include a handrail in the design of the jetty that caused him to fall off. They stated that he dived in because he thought a friend was drowning, and thus was responsible for the accident. His claim was unsuccessful.

In 2004 Fitzgibbon competed in the Disabled Sailing World Championship, which he won in his class, and was jointly awarded the Disabled Sailor of the Year along with Andrew Hartley.

In 2007, Fitzgibbon partnered with Rachael Cox in the SKUD International Championships, where they won a gold medal. They later competed in the IFDS World Championships and placed fifth. They were jointly named as Sailors of the Year with a Disability. The two teamed up again in the 2008 Beijing Paralympics in the SKUD 18 class and won the silver medal. The class, which premiered at the 2008 games, was created when Fitzgibbon convinced the International Foundation for Disabled Sailing to adapt the class to allow two sailors with disabilities to participate. They were again jointly named the Sailors of the Year with a Disability.

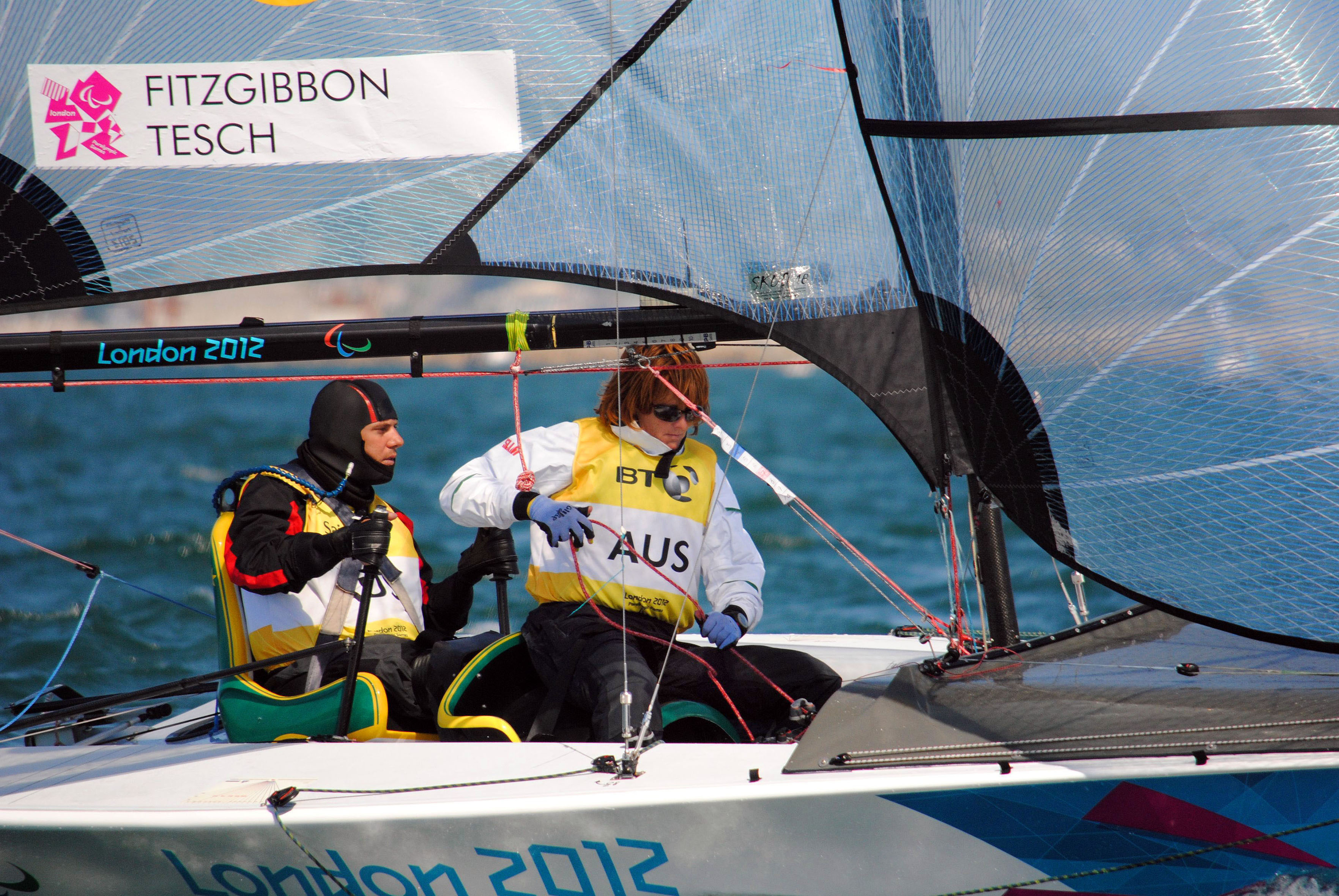
Fitzgibbon and Tesch sailing at the 2012 London Paralympics

After seeing Liesl Tesch in an SBS documentary about the boat Sailors with Disabilities competing in the 2009 Sydney to Hobart Yacht Race, Fitzgibbon contacted her in late 2010 and they formed a sailing partnership. He partnered with Tesch at the ISAF World Cup in January 2011 where they won gold, and at the IFDS World Championships in July, where they won bronze. The pair were jointly named as Sailors of the Year with a Disability, the fourth time Fitzgibbon won the award.

At the 2012 London Paralympics, the pair won a gold medal in the Mixed Two Person SKUD18. At the 2014 IFDS World Championships in Halifax, Canada, Fitzgibbon teamed with Tesch to win the two-person SKUD 18 class.

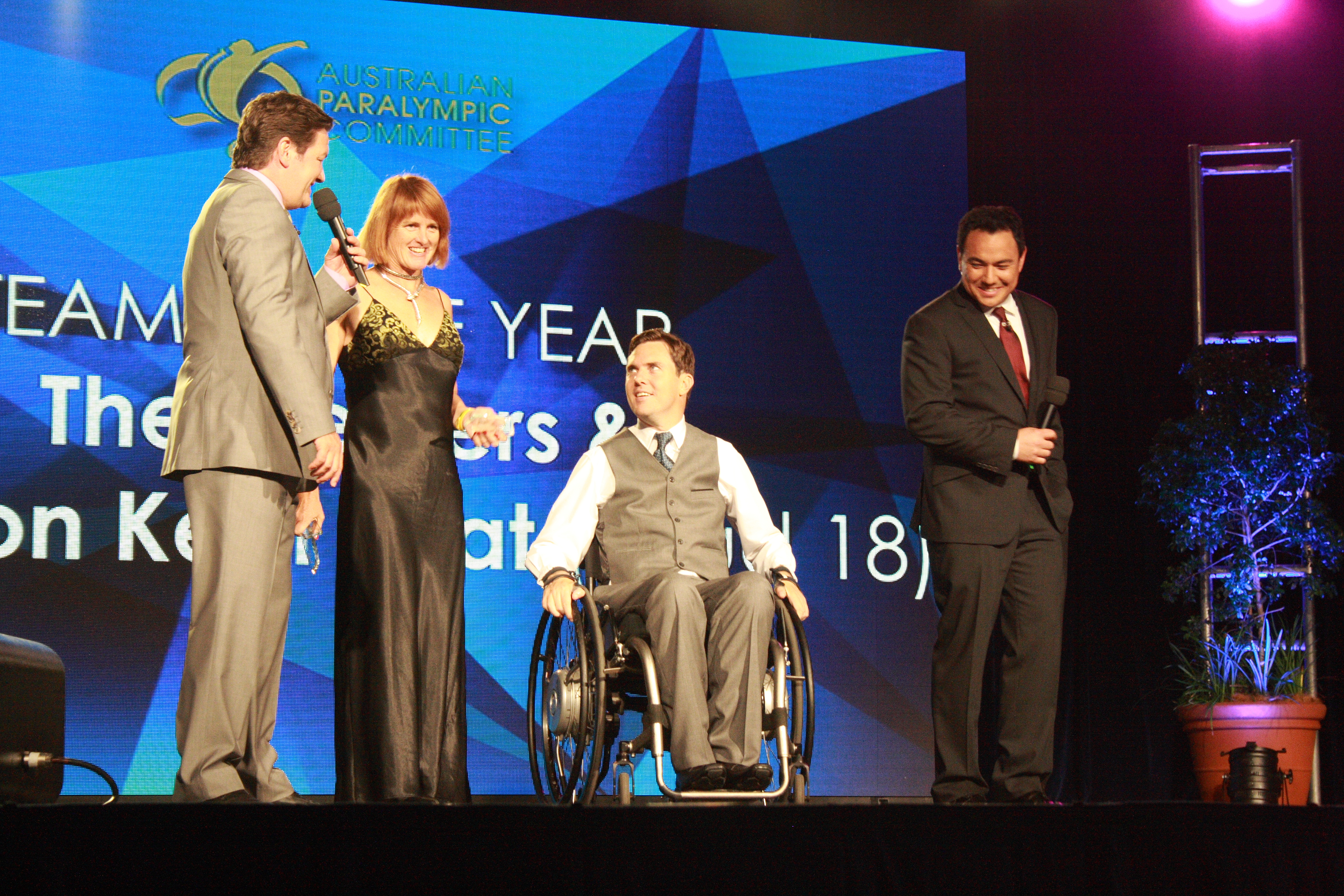
Fitzgibbon and Tesch receiving the Team of the Year award at the 2012 Australian Paralympian of the Year ceremony

Fitzgibbon and Tesch won the 2015 IFDS World Championships in Melbourne. After winning the title Fitzgibbon said: "We're still learning every day. That's what sailing is. You never stop learning and enjoying the sport and we ended up winning a gold medal and since London we are undefeated, we won the world championships last time and we are trying to win this one and we've won every world cup event we've been in. The competition gets harder and harder, though that's the thing – we've just got to keep improving."

Fitzgibbon and Tesch won the bronze medal in the SKUD 18 class at the 2016 World Championships held in Medemblik, Netherlands.

Fitzgibbon and Tesch won back to back Paralympic gold medals by winning the SKUD18 at the 2016 Rio Paralympics. They won eight out of 11 races and came second in the other three.

== Recognition ==
Fitzgibbon was awarded an Order of Australia Medal in the 2014 Australia Day Honours "for service to sport as a Gold Medallist at the London 2012 Paralympic Games." In November 2014, Fitzgibbon shared the Yachting Australia Sailor of the Year with a Disability award with Liesl Tesch, Colin Harrison, Jonathan Harris, Russell Boaden and Matthew Bugg. The Australian team of six sailors beat Great Britain by one point at the IFDS World Championship. Fitzgibbon and Tesch won the 2014 NSW Sports Award for Team of the Year with a Disability. In November 2015, Fitzgibbon and Tesch were awarded Yachting Australia's 2015 Sailor of the Year with a Disability. In November 2017, Fitzgibbon and Liesl Tesch were inaugural inductees to the Australian Sailing Hall of Fame.
