= Russell Boaden =

Australian Paralympic sailor

Russell Boaden OAM
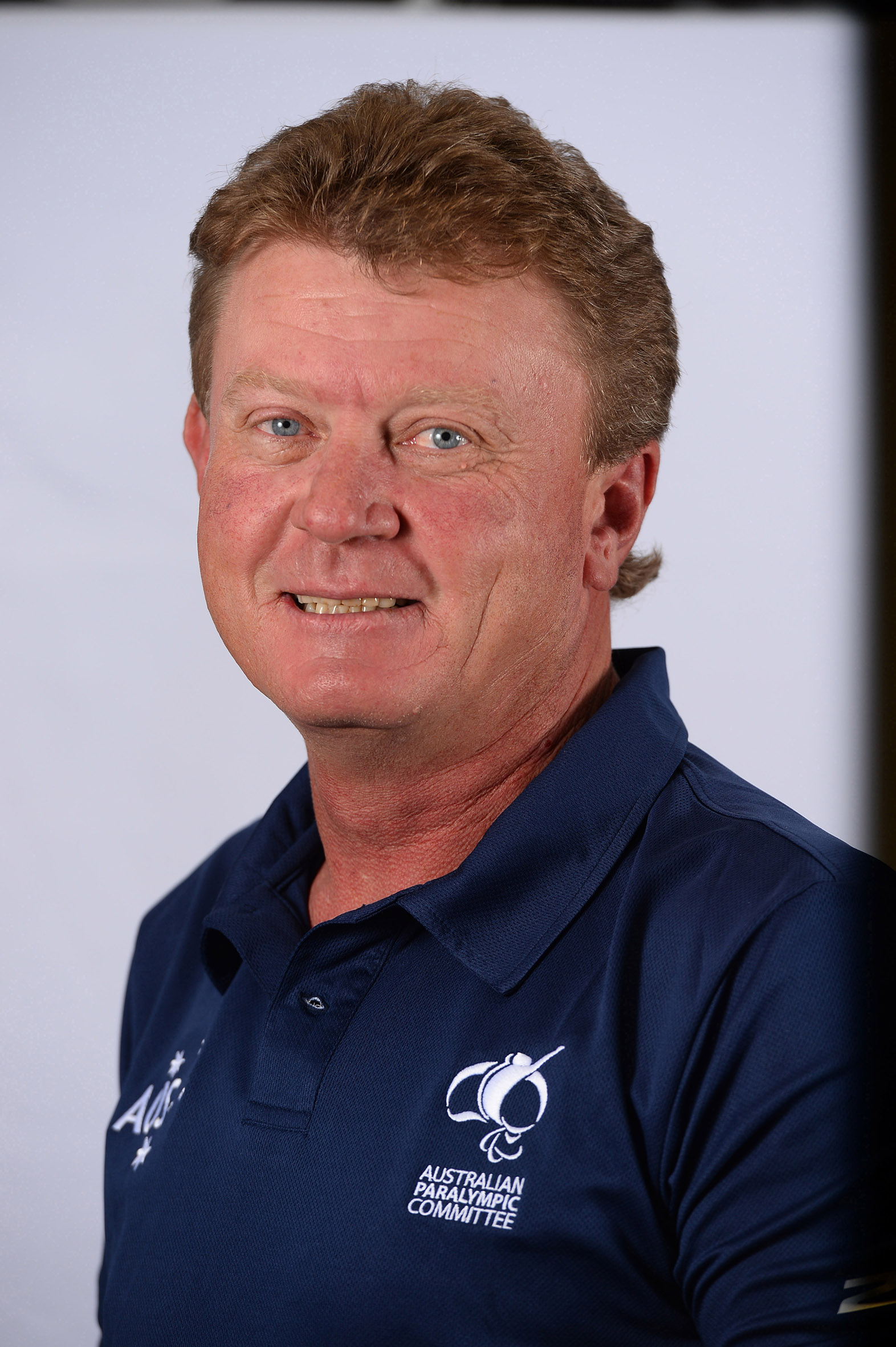
- 2016 Australian Paralympic team portrait

Personal information
- Nationality: Australian
- Born: 15 December 1969 (age 56)
Medal record
Sailing
Representing Australia
Paralympic Games
Gold medal – first place	2016 Rio	Mixed Three Person Sonar
Bronze medal – third place	2008 Beijing	Mixed Three Person Sonar
IFDS World Championships
Bronze medal – third place	2013 Kinsale	Mixed Three Person Sonar
Bronze medal – third place	2014 Halifax	Mixed Three Person Sonar
Silver medal – second place	2015 Melbourne	Mixed Three Person Sonar
Bronze medal – third place	2016 Medemblik	Mixed Three Person Sonar

Russell Boaden (born 15 December 1969) is a Paralympic sailor from Australia. He won a bronze medal at the 2008 Beijing Paralympics, and a won a gold medal in the Mixed Three Person Sonar the 2016 Rio Paralympics.

== Personal ==
Boaden was born on 15 December 1969. His brachial plexus was damaged as a result of a motorbike accident.

== Career ==
He won a bronze medal at the 2008 Beijing Games in the Mixed Three Person Sonar event. At the 2013 IFDS World Championships in Kinsale, Ireland, he teamed with Jonathan Harris and Colin Harrison to win the bronze medal in the Sonar Class. In October 2013, the trio were named Yachting Australia's Sailors of the Year with a Disability. At the 2014 IFDS World Championships in Halifax, Canada, Boaden teamed with Harrison and Harris to win the bronze medal in the Sonar Class. In November 2014, Boaden shared the Yachting Australia Sailor of the Year with a Disability award with Daniel Fitzgibbon, Liesl Tesch, Colin Harrison, Jonathan Harris and Matthew Bugg. The Australian team of six sailors beat Great Britain by one point at the IFDS World Championship.

At the 2015 IFDS Championships in Australia, he teamed with Colin Harrison and Jonathan Harris to win the silver medal behind the Great Britain crew. Their score was 37.0 to Great Britain's 36.0. Boaden, Harris and Harrison won the bronze medal in the Mixed Three Person Sonar class at the 2016 World Championships held in Medemblik, Netherlands. They won the gold medal in the Mixed Three Person Sonar class at 2016 Summer Paralympics. During the event they had three first placings and four second placings. He was awarded the Order of Australia Medal in 2017.
