= Graeme Martin =

Australian Paralympic sailor

Graeme Martin OAM
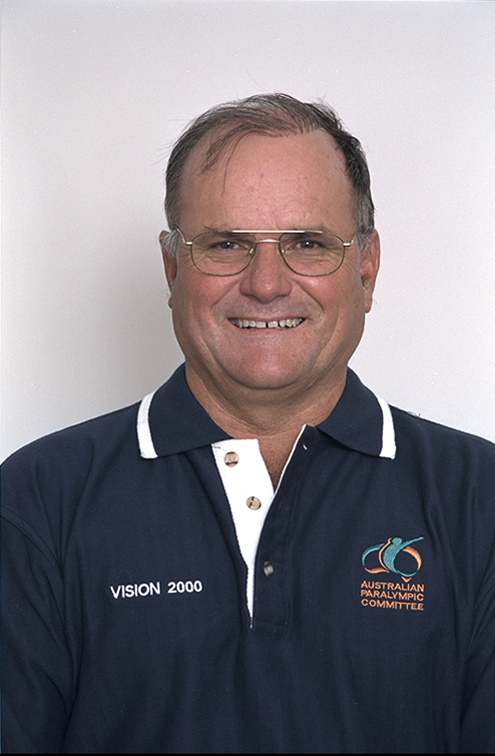
- 2000 Australian Paralympic team portrait of Martin

Personal information
- Full name: Graeme Martin
- Nationality: Australia
- Born: 11 March 1949 (age 77) Perth, Western Australia
Medal record
Sailing
Paralympic Games
Gold medal – first place	2000 Sydney	Mixed Three Person Sonar
Bronze medal – third place	2008 Beijing	Mixed Three Person Sonar

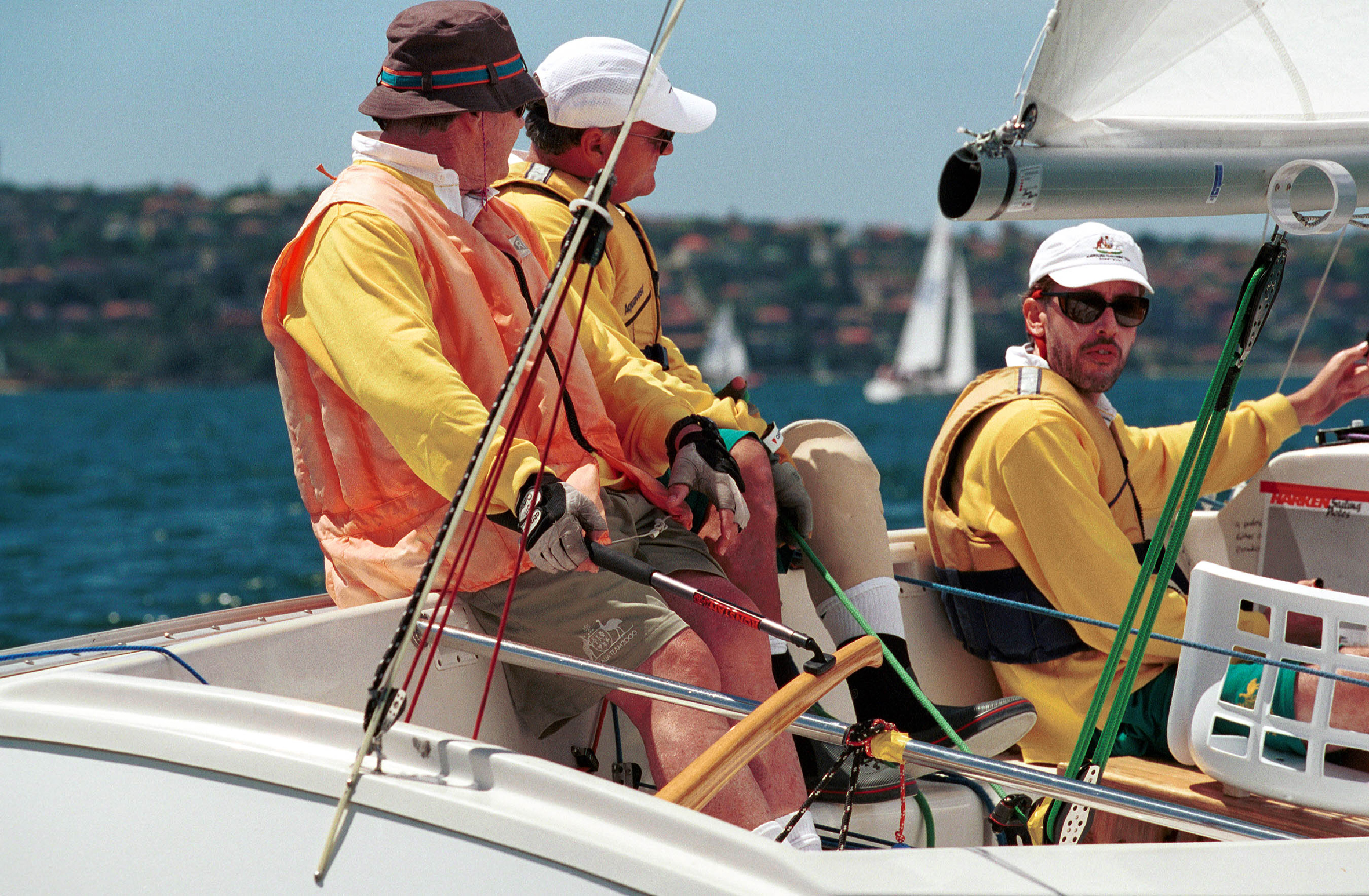
Close up of Australian sonar class sailors Graeme Martin, Jamie Dunross and Noel Robins sailing in the Sydney Harbour during competition at the 2000 Summer Paralympics

Graeme Martin is an Australian Paralympic sailor.

== Biography ==
Martin was born on 11 March 1949 in Perth, Western Australia. Formerly a firefighter, his left leg was amputated after an accident that occurred while he was fighting a fire caused by arson at a winery in the Perth suburb of Caversham. In 2000, he won the North American championship for disabled persons in St. Petersburg, Florida with Noel Robins and Jamie Dunross, in preparation for the 2000 Sydney Games. At the Games, he won a gold medal with Robins and Dunross in the Mixed Three Person Sonar event, for which he received a Medal of the Order of Australia. This gold medal achievement was initially the only medal ever won by Australian sailors at the Games. At the 2008 Beijing Games, he won a bronze medal in the Mixed Three Person Sonar event. At these Games, Martin competed alongside 2 other athletes; Russell Boaden and Colin Harrison.

In 2020, Martin along with Noel Robins and Jamie Dunross were inducted into the Australian Sailing Hall of Fame.
