= Jamie Dunross =

Australian Paralympic sailor

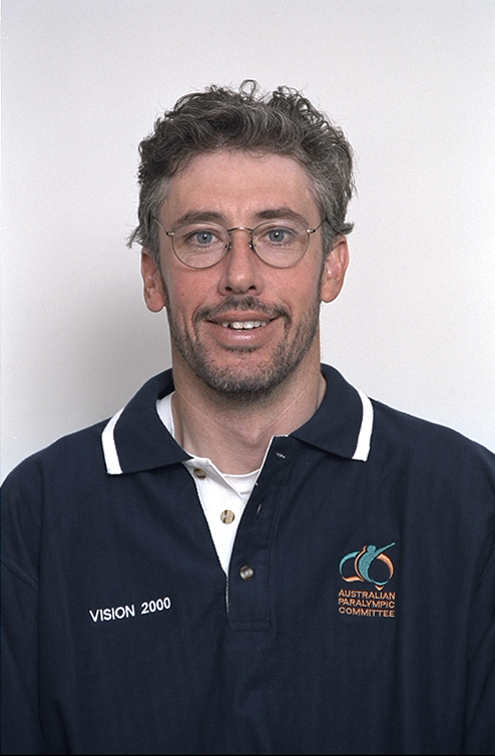
- 2000 Australian Paralympic team portrait of Dunross

Personal information
- Full name: Jamie Barry Dunross
- Nationality: Australia
- Born: 28 August 1965 (age 60) Melbourne, Victoria)
Medal record
Sailing
Paralympic Games
Gold medal – first place	2000 Sydney	Mixed Three Person Sonar

Jamie Barry Dunross, OAM (born 28 August 1965) is an Australian sailor who won a gold medal at the 2000 Sydney Paralympics.

== Personal ==
Dunross was born in Melbourne on 28 August 1965. A former miner, he became a quadriplegic after an explosion at a gold mine in Kalgoorlie. He cannot use his legs, and has very restricted use of his arms. Jamie had depression for five years after the accident, and his passion for sailing helped him to recover from it. He has two children.

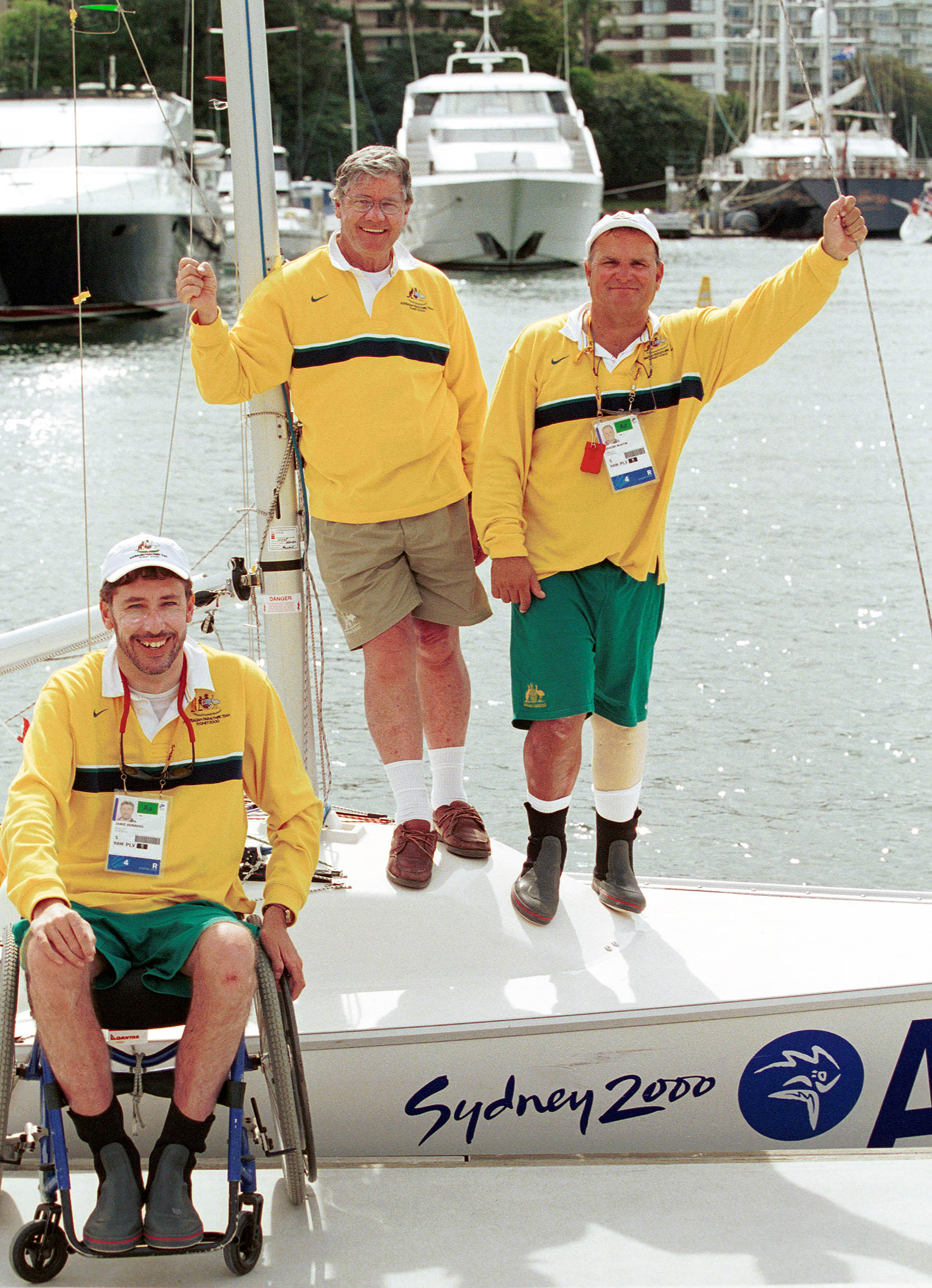
Australian sailors Jamie Dunross (seen left), Noel Robins and Graeme Martin at Sydney Harbout with their boat during the 2000 Summer Paralympics

== Career and aftermath ==
In 2000, in preparation for the 2000 Sydney Games, Dunross won the North American championship in the Mixed Three Person Sonar event in St. Petersburg, Florida with Noel Robins and Graeme Martin. At the Sydney Games, Jamie won a gold medal with Robins and Martin again in the Mixed Three Person Sonar event, in which he received a Medal of the Order of Australia for his 'service to sport'. He also participated in the Mixed Three Person Sonar event at the 2004 Athens Games, but did not win a medal. In 2010, Dunross became the first person with quadriplegia to circumnavigate around Australia unassisted.

On 9 August 2016, his 2000 Paralympic gold medal was stolen during a burglary at the Royal Perth Yacht Club. He said he was devastated by the theft. "I was really shocked, actually quite numb. All of a sudden the memories started flowing back from 2000 ... getting the medal put around my neck, and to think that I might not see it again, it really did hit home", he said. He also stated that if the medal was returned, it would go back on display at the Royal Perth Yacht Club.

In 2020, Dunross along with Noel Robins and Graeme Martin were inducted into the Australian Sailing Hall of Fame.
