= Colin Harrison (sailor) =

Australian Paralympic sailor

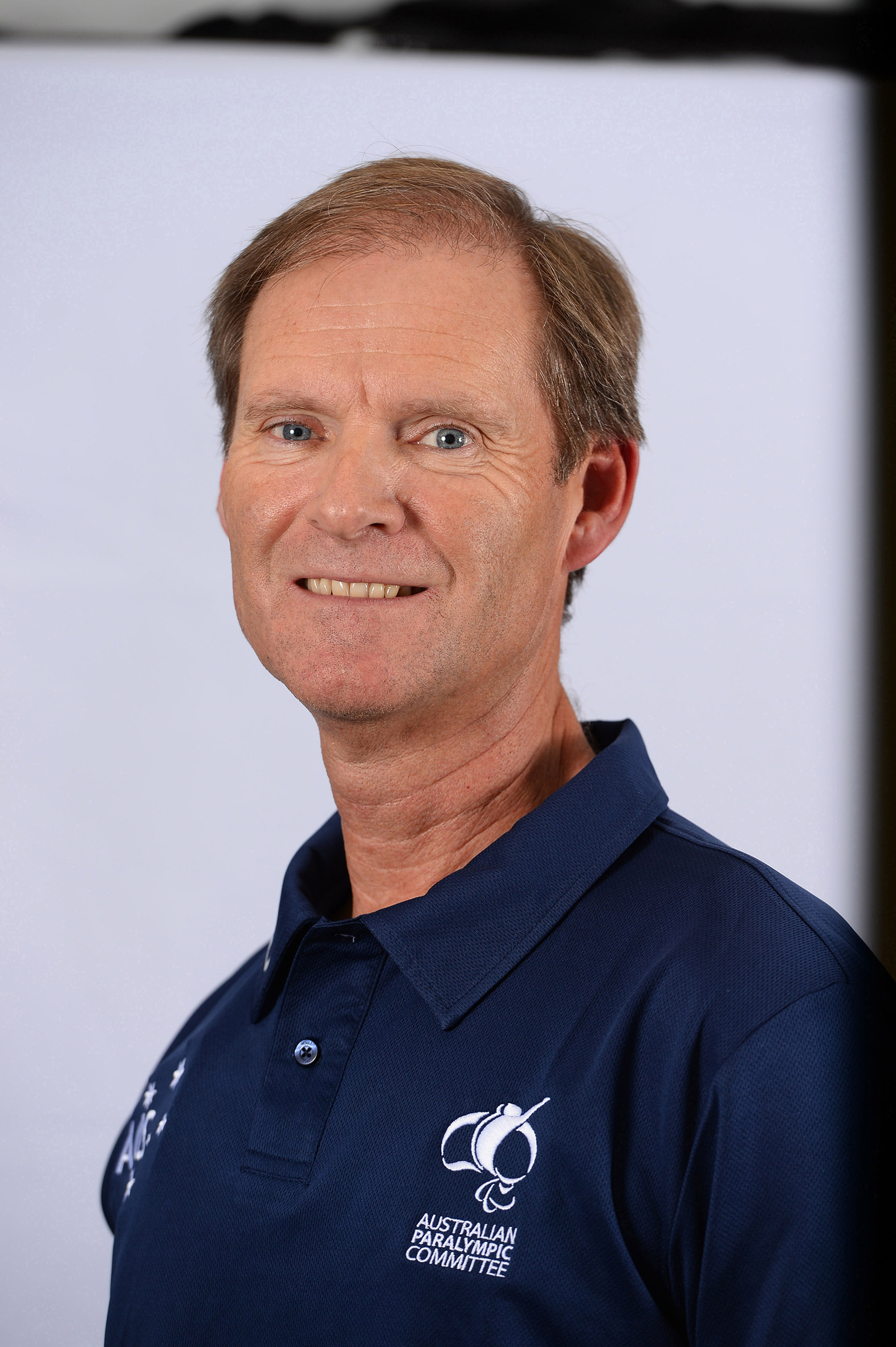
- 2016 Australian Paralympic team portrait

Personal information
- Nationality: Australia
- Born: February 20, 1961 (age 65)
Medal record
Sailing
Paralympic Games
Gold medal – first place	2016 Rio	Mixed Three Person Sonar
Bronze medal – third place	2008 Beijing	Mixed Three Person Sonar
IFDS World Championships
Bronze medal – third place	2013 Kinsale	Mixed Three Person Sonar
Bronze medal – third place	2014 Halifax	Mixed Three Person Sonar
Silver medal – second place	2015 Melbourne	Mixed Three Person Sonar
Bronze medal – third place	2016 Medemblik	Mixed Three Person Sonar

Colin Anthony Harrison OAM (born 20 February 1961) is an Australian Paralympic sailor. He won the bronze medal at the 2008 Beijing Paralympics, and the gold medal at the 2016 Rio Paralympics in the Three Person Sonar.

== Personal ==
He was born on 20 February 1960. He is a right forequarter amputee due to cancer.

== Career ==
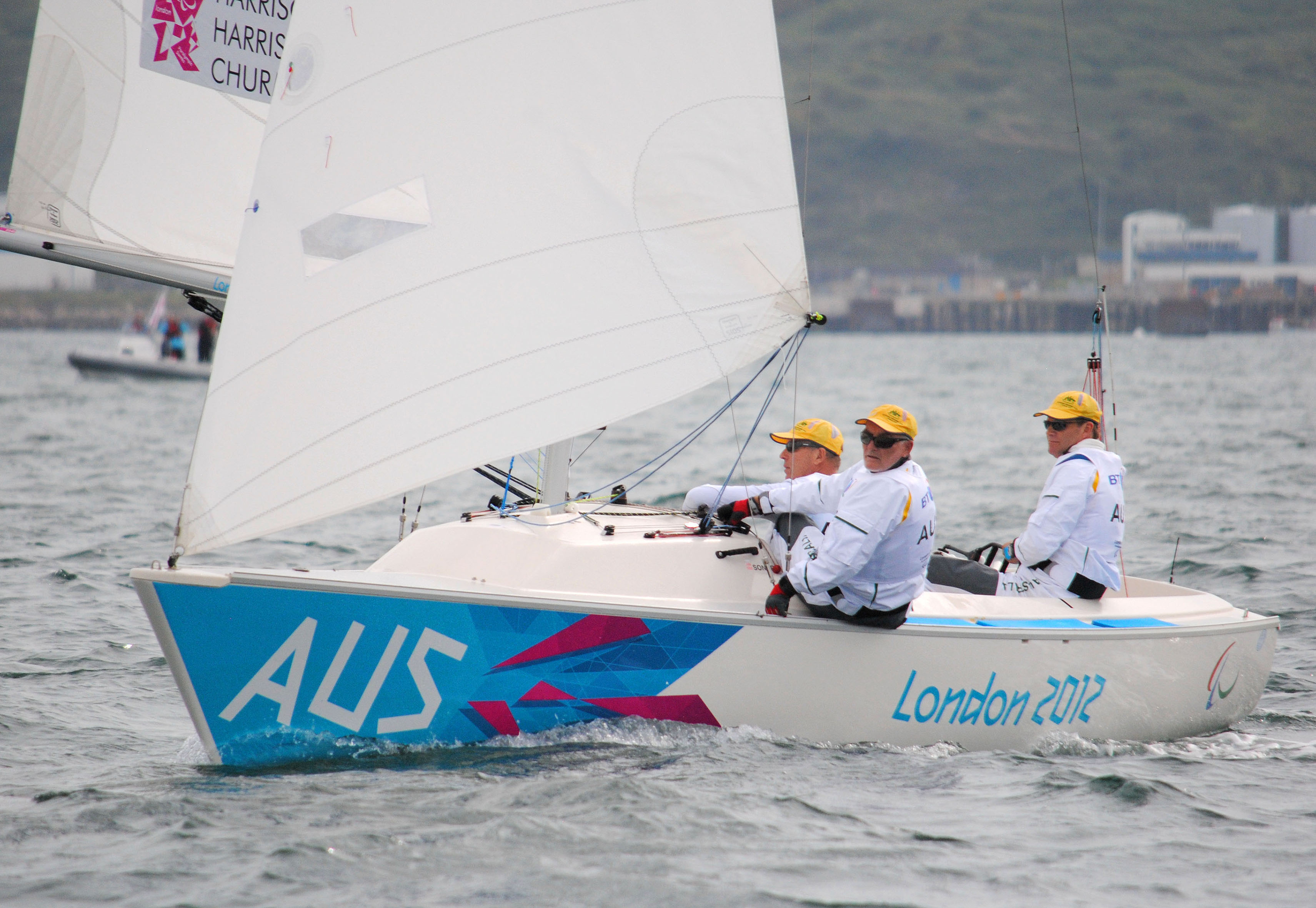
Jonathan Harris, Stephen Churm and Colin Harrison sailing at the 2012 London Paralympics

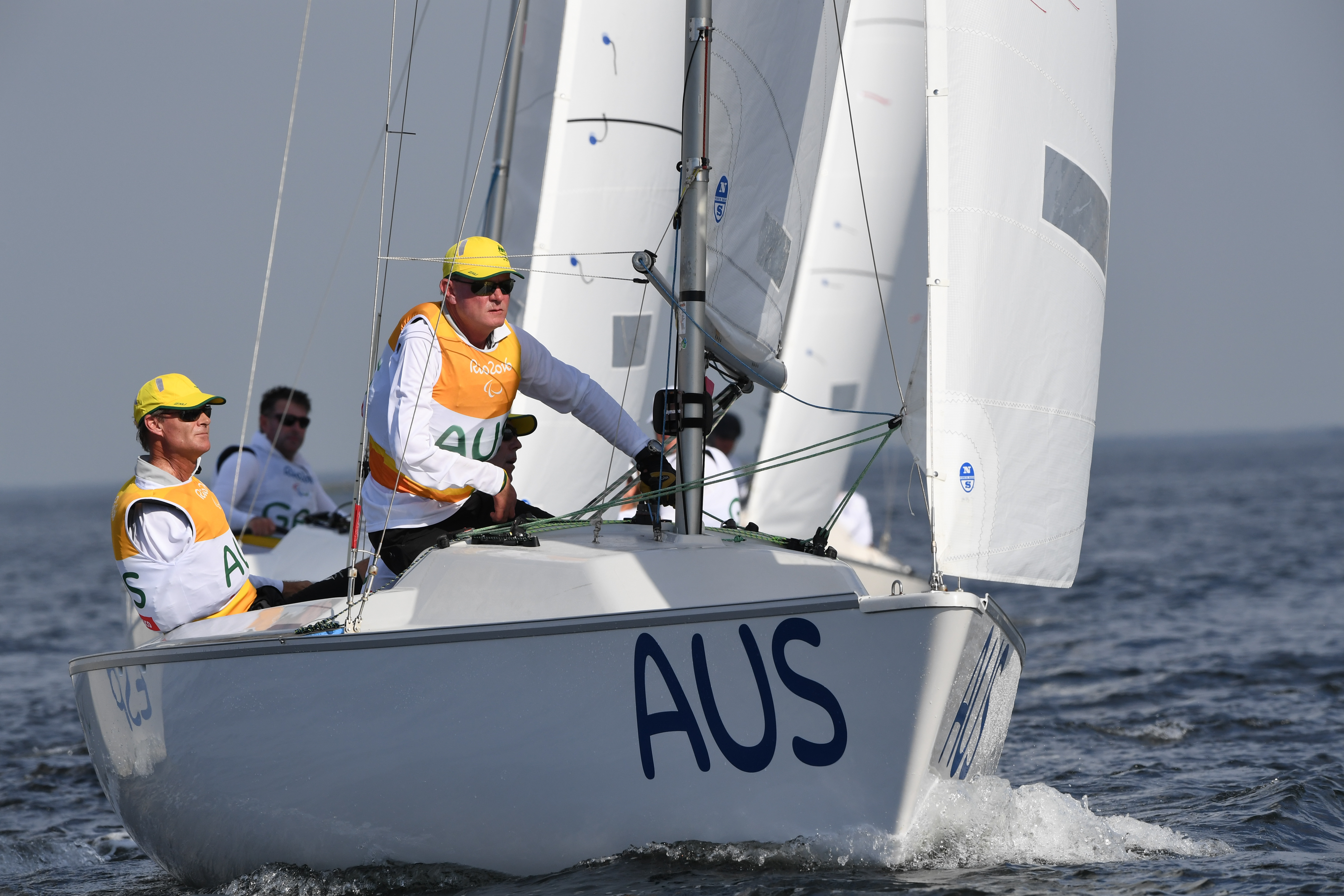
Colin Harrison, Russell Boaden, Jonathan Harris sailing at the 2016 Rio Paralympics

He participated in the Mixed Three Person Sonar event at the 2004 Athens Games without winning a medal, and won a bronze medal in the same event at the 2008 Beijing Games. His team finished 6th at the 2012 Games.

At the 2013 IFDS World Championships in Kinsale, Ireland, he teamed with Jonathan Harris (sailor) and Russell Boaden to win the bronze medal in the Sonar Class. In October 2013, the trio were named Yachting Australia's Sailors of the Year with a Disability. At the 2014 IFDS World Championships in Halifax, Canada, Harrison teamed with Harris and Boaden to win the bronze medal in the Sonar Class. In November 2014, Harrison shared the Yachting Australia Sailor of the Year with a Disability award with Daniel Fitzgibbon, Liesl Tesch, Jonathan Harris, Russell Boaden and Matthew Bugg. The Australian team of six sailors beat Great Britain by one point at the IFDS World Championship.

At the 2015 IFDS Championships in Melbourne, Australia he teamed with Boaden and Harris to win the silver medal behind the Great Britain crew. Their score was 37.0 to Great Britain's 36.0.

Harrison, Boaden and Harris won the bronze medal in the Mixed Three Person Sonar class at the 2016 World Championships held in Medemblik, Netherlands.

Harrison, Boaden and Harris won the gold medal in the Mixed Three Person Sonar class at 2016 Summer Paralympics. During the event they had three first placings and four second placings. He was awarded the Order of Australia Medal in 2017.
