= Noel Robins =

Australian sailor (1935–2003)

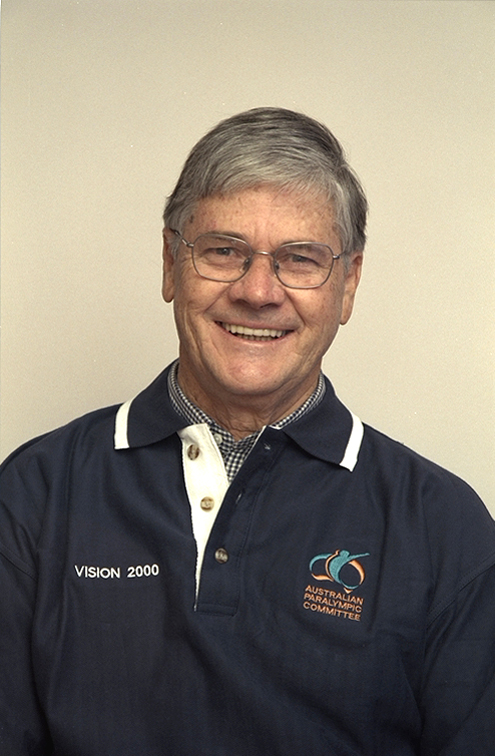
- 2000 Australian Paralympic team portrait of Robins

Personal information
- Full name: David Noel Robins
- Nickname: Stumbles
- Nationality: Australia
- Born: 3 September 1935 Perth, Western Australia
- Died: 22 May 2003 (aged 67) Perth, Western Australia

Sailing career
- Sport: Sailing
- Class(es): Soling; Sonar; 12 Metre
Medal record
Representing Australia
Sailing
Paralympic Games
Gold medal – first place	2000 Sydney	Mixed Three Person Sonar
- Updated on 13-April-2020

David Noel Robins, OAM (3 September 1935 – 22 May 2003) was an Australian sailor. He began sailing as a child, and became partially quadriplegic after receiving a spinal fracture from a car crash at the age of 21. He was the skipper of Australia in the 1977 America's Cup, won the 1981 Admiral's Cup, and won a gold medal in sailing at the 2000 Sydney Paralympics. He died on 22 May 2003, four weeks after being struck by a car.

== Personal ==
Robins was born in Perth on 3 September 1935. He began sailing at the age of eleven. He graduated from Claremont Teachers College in 1955. At the age of 21, he was a passenger in a car crash on Mounts Bay Road, which left him with a broken neck and a fractured spine; as a result, he became a "walking quadriplegic", with reduced mobility and strength in all four limbs. He was married and had three children, two daughters and a son. He was known by his fellow sailors as "Stumbles".

== Career ==
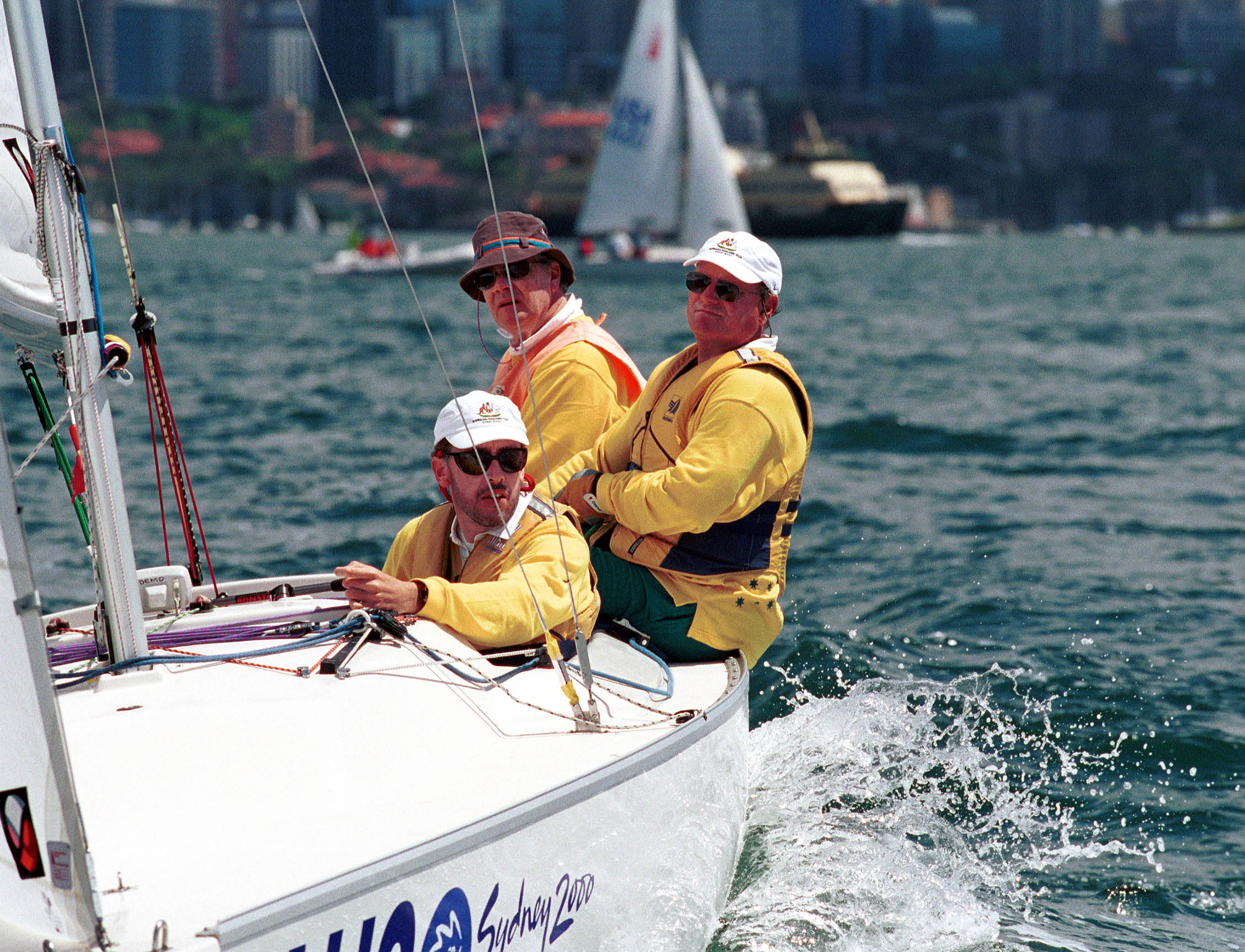
Action shot of Australian sonar class sailor Noel Robins with teammates Jamie Dunross and Graeme Martin on their boat in the Sydney Harbour during sailing competition at the 2000 Summer Paralympics

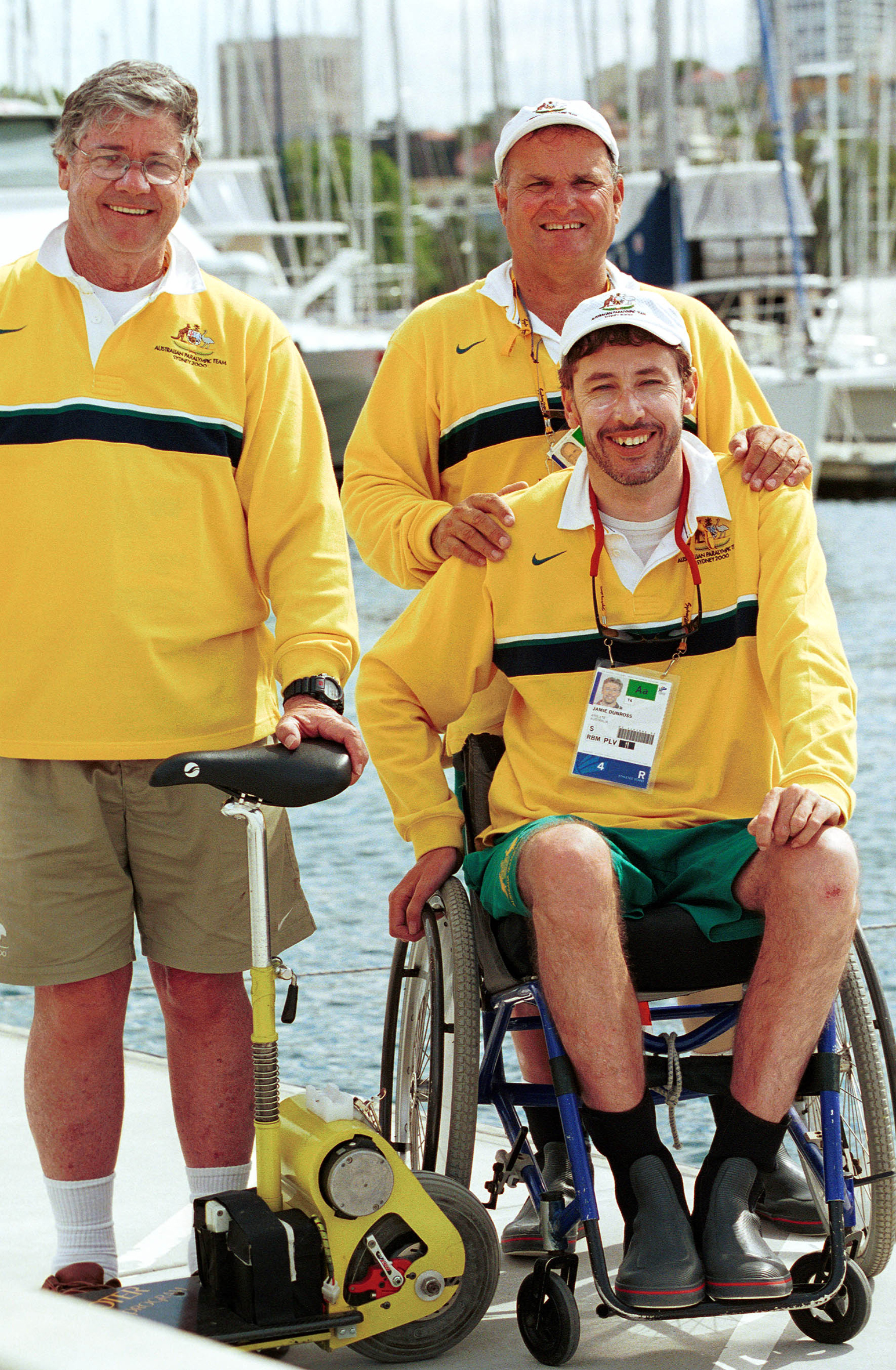
Portrait of Australian sailors (left to right) Noel Robins, Graeme Martin and Jamie Dunross at Sydney Harbour during the 2000 Summer Paralympics

Robins's first national sailing competition was the 14 ft Championship in 1958, and his first international competition was the Sydney Sailing World Championships in 1973. He won an international Soling Class, was selected by Alan Bond to be the skipper of Australia, the Australian challenger at the 1977 America's Cup, and was part of its crew at the 1980 America's Cup. In 1981 he skippered Hitchhiker II, which won that year's Admiral's Cup in Cowes and the Two Ton World Championship in Porto Cervo, Sardinia. For the 1987 America's Cup, he was the executive director of the America's Cup Defence Committee of the Royal Perth Yacht Club.

He worked in real estate, was a commissioner of the Western Australian Waters and Rivers Commission, and was a board member of the Western Australian ParaQuad Association. He was also a member of the Australian National Maritime Museum's governing council from 1998, an executive director of the Duyfken 1606 Replica Foundation, and a long-time member and deputy chair of the Swan River Trust.

In 2000, he won the North American championship for disabled persons in St. Petersburg, Florida with Jamie Dunross and Graeme Martin, in preparation for the 2000 Sydney Games. At the games, he won a gold medal with Dunrose and Martin in the Mixed Three Person Sonar event, and became the oldest Australian to win a medal at the Paralympics. He retired from international competition after the games, but continued to compete in state and national championships, becoming the champion in the 14 ft dinghy class and state and national champion in the Diamond and Soling classes.

== Death ==
On 23 April 2003, Robins was struck by a motorist while crossing Mends Street in South Perth. He died on 22 May after being in a coma for four weeks.

== Recognition ==
Robins received an Australian Sports Medal in 2000 and a Centenary Medal in 2001. He received a Medal of the Order of Australia in 2001 for his Paralympic gold medal. In 2013, he was posthumously inducted into the America's Cup Hall of Fame. in 2020, Robins along with Jamie Dunross and Graeme Martin were inducted into the Australian Sailing Hall of Fame.
