= International Association for Disabled Sailing =

Former international paralympic sailing sports body

International Association for Disabled Sailing IFDS
- Sport: Sailing
- Official website: www.ifds.org
- Former names: International Foundation for Disabled Sailing
- Year of disbandment: 2014
- Superseded by: World Sailing

The International Association for Disabled Sailing (IFDS) was an affiliate member of the International Sailing Federation and was responsible for coordinating the paralympic sailing competition with the International Paralympic Committee. The organisation was initially called the International Foundation for Disabled Sailing up until around 2008 when it had to change its name due to tax law in the country it is registered in.

World Sailing reintegrated Disabled Sailing in November 2014 under it direct control and re-formed as ISAF Disabled Sailing Committee (DAC) -
"The creation of a single governing body for Member National Authorities (MNAs) and sailors will better serve the needs and interests of sailors with disabilities, and provide consistency within the sport, from relationships with the World Anti-Doping Agency (WADA) to technical support and operational efficiencies."

To complete the merger, the IFDS Foundation was dissolved during the 2015 ISAF Annual Conference held in Sanya, China. The Disabled Sailing Committee then rebranded as the Para World Sailing Committee, the new name for approval by the ISAF Council. Betsy Alison (USA) has been appointed as Chair of the Disabled Sailing Committee.

== Events ==
=== Paralympic Games ===
Sailing was introduced to the Paralympic Games as a demonstration sport in 1996, and became an official Paralympic sport in the 2000 Summer Games.

=== IFDS World Championships ===
The organisation ran a number of ISAF recognised world championships to help develop international competition.

== Equipment ==
Sailing is an equipment-based sport, therefore most boats can be adapted to suit certain disability types. The following classes are approved for use in the Paralympic Sailing event of the 2016 Rio Paralympic Games:

- Open One Person Keelboat — Norlin Mk3 One Design a subsection of the 2.4 Metre class
- Mixed Two Person Keelboat — SKUD 18
- Open Three Person Keelboat — Sonar

== Removal from the Paralympic Games ==
In late January 2015, the International Paralympic Committee dropped Paralympic Sailing from the 2020 Tokyo Paralympic Games as did Sailing "did not fulfil the IPC Handbook's minimum criteria for worldwide reach."

The news was a major disappointment for the sport of disabled sailing worldwide. In the ensuing months, para sailors, supporters and MNAs worldwide blamed IFDS for failure to produce the required documentation to keep the sport in the Paralympics. A campaign to appeal to IPC to Reinstate Paralympic Sailing in Tokyo 2020 erupted on sailing blogs, news sites, social media, even ISAF and continued for months after.

Yachting Australia President Matt Allen said, "The decision to take sailing out of the Tokyo 2020 Paralympic Games has left us stunned. We will consult with our ISAF colleagues to support the case for sailing and for all avenues to be explored for the Tokyo 2020 Paralympic Games and beyond. We have spoken with the Australian Paralympic Committee who have offered their support and sought clarity on the decision from the International Paralympic Committee", added Matt.

== Campaign for reinstatement to the Paralympic Games ==
World Sailing actively campaigns for sailing to be reinstated in the Paralympic Games. This follows substantial commitments to grow para sailing globally.
