= 2023 Sailing World Championships – 2.4 Metre =

2.4 Metre at the 2023 Sailing World Championships
- Venue: The Hague, the Netherlands
- Dates: 11–16 August
- Competitors: 12 from 9 nations

Medalists
gold medal	Heiko Kröger	Germany
silver medal	Davide Di Maria	Italy
bronze medal	Antonio Squizzato	Italy

The 2.4 Metre competition at the 2023 Sailing World Championships was the open one-person technical para event and was held in The Hague, the Netherlands, 11–16 August 2023. The entries were limited to 40 boats. The competitors participated in a series that was planned to 10 races. The last race was planned for 16 August.

== Summary ==
Leading up to the championship, Antonio Squizzato of Italy had won the open Kiel Week in June.

Heiko Kröger took the lead first day winning both races. Kröger, the Paralympic gold medallist in the event from the 2000 Paralympic sailing competition, won the event and his 14th world championship title. Kröger won with one day to spare. Davide Di Maria of Italy took the silver medal, while his teammate Squizzato took the bronze.

== Results ==
Results of individual races
Pos	Helmsman	Country	I	II	III	IV	V	VI	VII	VIII	IX	X	Tot	Pts
Gold medal	Heiko Kröger	Germany	1	1	1	1	1	1	2	2	1	5^{†}	16	11
Silver medal	Davide Di Maria	Italy	2	2	3	3	2	2	1	1	5^{†}	2	23	18
Bronze medal	Antonio Squizzato	Italy	3	4	2	2	5	3	UFD 13^{†}	3	2	1	38	25
4	Niko Salomaa	Finland	5	5	6	5	4	4	UFD 13^{†}	4	3	4	53	40
5	Daniel Bína	Czech Republic	4	3	4	4	12	DSQ 13^{†}	3	6	4	3	56	43
6	Mario Graus	Austria	7	10	7	8	11^{†}	5	10	5	8	8	79	68
7	Kurt Badstober	Austria	6	9	5	11	6	6	6	10	9	DNS 13^{†}	81	68
8	Pieter Visser	Netherlands	10	NSC 13^{†}	11	6	7	11	4	8	10	6	86	73
9	Patric Rosenberg	Sweden	9	6	10	7	9	8	8	12^{†}	6	11	86	74
10	Foo Yuen Wai	Hong Kong	11	8	9	12^{†}	3	10	9	7	12	7	88	76
11	Alexander Sadílek	Czech Republic	8	7	8	10	10	9	5	11^{†}	11	9	88	77
12	John Seepe	United States	12	11	NSC 13^{†}	9	8	7	7	9	7	10	93	80

Scoring system: low-point system; Source:
Legend: DNS – Did not start; DSQ – Disqualified; NSC – Did not sail the course; UFD – "U" flag disqualification; † – Discarded race not counted in the overall result;
