= 2.4 Metre World Championship =

Keelboat sailing regatta

The 2.4 Metre World Championship is an annual international sailing regatta of 2.4 Metre keelboats, organized by the host club on behalf of the International 2.4mR Class Association and recognized by World Sailing, the sports IOC recognized governing body.

In addition, the class has been used extensively for disabled sailing as the 2.4-metre and also a one-design version of the class, the Norlin Mk3 design. With annual world championship held as part of the Para World Sailing Championships.

== Events ==
| Ed. | Date | | Location | | | Competitors | | | | | Ref. |
| Ed. | Day/Month | Year | Host club | City | Country | Boats | Nat. | Cont. | | | Ref. |
|---|---|---|---|---|---|---|---|---|---|---|---|
| 1 | 20–25 July | 1993 | | Kokkola | Finland | 64 | 8 | 2 | | | |
| 2 | | 1994 | Rutland Sailing Club | Rutland Water | United Kingdom | 41 | 9 | 2 | | | |
| 3 | 24–30 July | 1995 | | Aarhus | Denmark | 62 | 11 | 3 | | | |
| 4 | 7–11 October | 1996 | | Cannes | France | 76 | 9 | 1 | | | |
| 5 | 20–27 March | 1997 | | Dubai | United Arab Emirates | 86 | 7+ | 2+ | | | |
| 6 | 28 July – 2 August | 1998 | | Tampere | Finland | 104 | 14 | 3 | | | |
| 7 | 26–31 July | 1999 | Royal Gothenburg Yacht Club | Marstrand | Sweden | 91 | 12 | 3 | | | |
| 8 | 2–8 March | 2000 | Royal Yacht Club of Victoria | Melbourne | Australia | 66 | 10 | 4 | | | |
| 9 | 29 July – 4 August | 2001 | Tønsberg Seilforening | Tønsberg | Norway | 89 | 11 | 3 | | | |
| 10 | 7–14 February | 2002 | | Coconut Grove | United States | 55 | 8 | 2 | | | |
| 11 | 18–23 August | 2003 | Segelclub Eckernförde | Eckernförde | Germany | 84 | 10 | 3 | | | |
| 12 | 26–31 July | 2004 | Gefle Segelsällskap | Gävle | Sweden | 92 | 12 | 4 | | | |
| 13 | 19–25 September | 2005 | Circolo della Vela Marciana Marina | Marciana | Italy | 88 | 10 | 2 | | | |
| 14 | 29 July – 4 August | 2006 | Helsingfors Segelklubb | Helsinki | Finland | 95 | 11 | 3 | | | |
| 15 | 4–9 August | 2007 | Kolding Sejlklub | Kolding | Denmark | 76 | 10 | 2 | 72 | 4 | |
| 16 | 19–26 October | 2008 | Real Club Náutico de Gran Canaria | Las Palmas | Spain | 50 | 9 | 2 | 45 | 5 | |
| 17 | 1–6 November | 2009 | Edison Sailing Center | Fort Myers | United States | 44 | 7 | 2 | 37 | 7 | |
| 18 | 18–25 September | 2010 | Vatersportverenging van Hoorn | Hoorn | Netherlands | 82 | 15 | 3 | 76 | 6 | |
| 19 | 12–20 August | 2011 | Ålesunds Seilforening | Ålesund | Norway | 57 | 8 | 2 | 53 | 4 | |
| 20 | 16–22 September | 2012 | | Porto San Giorgio | Italy | 90 | 9 | 2 | 81 | 9 | |
| 21 | 8–14 September | 2013 | Poole Yacht Club | Dorset | United Kingdom | 75 | 11 | 3 | 67 | 8 | |
| 22 | 26 September – 3 October | 2014 | National Yacht Club, Toronto | Toronto | Canada | 35 | 6 | 2 | 27 | 8 | |
| 23 | 8–15 August | 2015 | Rauman Purjehdusseura | Rauma | Finland | 102 | 13 | 4 | 96 | 6 | |
| 24 | 5–10 January | 2016 | Royal Yacht Club of Tasmania | Hobart | Australia | 32 | 4 | 2 | 29 | 3 | |
| 25 | 30 June – 7 July | 2017 | Koninklijke Watersportvereniging Sneek | Sneek | Netherlands | 83 | 13 | 3 | 73 | 10 | |
| 26 | 4–10 August | 2018 | Gefle Segelsällskap | Gävle | Sweden | 72 | 8 | 2 | 65 | 7 | |
| 27 | 12–19 October | 2019 | Yacht Club Italiano | Genoa | Italy | 84 | 13 | 3 | 74 | 10 | |
| – | 7–13 November | 2020 | Davis Island Yacht Club | Tampa | United States | cancelled covid | | | | | |
| – | 7–14 August | 2021 | Tønsberg Seilforening | Tønsberg | Norway | cancelled covid | | | | | |
| 28 | 4–11 November | 2022 | Davis Island Yacht Club | Tampa | United States | 39 | 10 | 4 | 32 | 7 | |
| 29 | 31 July – 5 August | 2023 | Näsijärvi Sailing Club | Tampere | Finland | 59 | 9 | 3 | 53 | 6 | |
| 30 | 28 Jul-3 Aug | 2024 | Kieler Yacht Club | Kiel | Germany | 84 | 16 | 2 | 76 | 8 | |
| 31 | 1-12 Oct | 2025 | Fraglia Vela Malcesine | Lake Garda | Italy | 55 | 15 | 3 | 46 | 4 | |
| 32 | 7-12 July | 2026 | Koninklijke Watersportvereniging Sneek | Sneek | Netherlands | 85 | 17 | 3 | 81 | 4 | |

== Multiple champions ==
Compiled from the data below the table includes up to and including 2026.

| Ranking | Sailor | Gold | Silver | Bronze | Total | No. Entries |
| 1 | Stellan Berlin (SWE) | 11 | 5 | 1 | 17 | 20 |
| 2 | Heiko Kröger (GER) | 4 | 1 | 1 | 5 | 17 |
| 3 | Megan Pascoe (GBR) | 2 | 4 | 3 | 9 | 22 |
| 4 | Marko Dahlberg (FIN) | 2 | 4 | 2 | 8 | 28 |

== Medalists ==
| Year | Gold | Silver | Bronze |
|---|---|---|---|
| 1993 Kokkola | Patrik Forsgren (SWE) | Peter Norlin (SWE) | Ralf Casen (FIN) |
| 1994 Rutland Water | Bo Hedensjö (SWE) | Carl-Gustaf Fresk (SWE) | Staffan Bellander (SWE) |
| 1995 Aarhus | Carl-Gustaf Fresk (SWE) | Marko Dahlberg (FIN) | Bo Hedensjö (SWE) |
| 1996 Cannes | Peter Norlin (SWE) | Bo Hedensjö (SWE) | Imma Björndahl (FIN) |
| 1997 Dubai | Marko Dahlberg (FIN) | Peter Norlin (SWE) | Patrik Forsgren (SWE) |
| 1998 Tampere | Rikard Bjurström (FIN) | Matti Rouhiainen (FIN) | Peter Norlin (SWE) |
| 1999 Marstrand | Tom Björndahl (FIN) | Marko Dahlberg (FIN) | Peter Norlin (SWE) |
| 2000 Melbourne | Stellan Berlin (SWE) | Rikard Bjurström (FIN) | Peter Norlin (SWE) |
| 2001 Tønsberg | Heiko Kröger (GER) | Stellan Berlin (SWE) | Peter Norlin (SWE) |
| 2002 Miami | Stellan Berlin (SWE) | Hans Meyers (USA) | Tom Brown (USA) |
| 2003 Eckernförde | Marko Dahlberg (FIN) | Damien Seguin (FRA) | Stellan Berlin (SWE) |
| 2004 Gävle | Stellan Berlin (SWE) | Ulf Arvidsson (SWE) | Lachlan Gilbert (AUS) |
| 2005 Marciana | Nick Scandone (USA) | Stellan Berlin (SWE) | Helena Lucas (GBR) |
| 2006 Helsinki | Stellan Berlin (SWE) | Thierry Schmitter (NED) | Harri Malm (FIN) |
| 2007 Kolding | Lennart Heselius (SWE) | Stellan Berlin (SWE) | Ulf Arvidsson (SWE) |
| 2008 Las Palmas | Stellan Berlin (SWE) | Damien Seguin (FRA) | Hans Asklund (SWE) |
| 2009 Fort Myers | John Ruf (USA) | Carl Horrocks (USA) | Paul Tingley (CAN) |
| 2010 Hoorn | Paul Tingley (CAN) | Stellan Berlin (SWE) | Hans Asklund (SWE) |
| 2011 Ålesund | Stellan Berlin (SWE) | Marko Dahlberg (FIN) | Rikard Bjurström (FIN) |
| 2012 Porto San Giorgio | Peter Andersson (SWE) | Stellan Berlin (SWE) | Megan Pascoe (GBR) |
| 2013 Poole | Stellan Berlin (SWE) | Helena Lucas (GBR) | Megan Pascoe (GBR) |
| 2014 Toronto | Stellan Berlin (SWE) | Bjørnar Erikstad (NOR) | Helena Lucas (GBR) |
| 2015 Rauma | Stellan Berlin (SWE) | Bjørnar Erikstad (NOR) | Heiko Kröger (GER) |
| 2016 Hobart | Megan Pascoe (GBR) | Matt Bugg (AUS) | Paul Francis (NZL) |
| 2017 Sneek | Stellan Berlin (SWE) | Heiko Kröger (GER) | Hans Asklund (SWE) |
| 2018 Gävle | Stellan Berlin (SWE) | Megan Pascoe (GBR) | Marko Dahlberg (FIN) |
| 2019 Genoa | Megan Pascoe (GBR) | Marko Dahlberg (FIN) | Fia Fjelddahl (SWE) |
| 2020 Tampa | cancelled due to the COVID-19 pandemic | | |
| 2021 Tønsberg | cancelled due to the COVID-19 pandemic | | |
| 2022 Tampa | Dee Smith (USA) | Megan Pascoe (GBR) | Marko Dahlberg (FIN) |
| 2023 | Heiko Kröger (GER) | Megan Pascoe (GBR) | Jan Forsbom (FIN) |
| 2024 | Heiko Kröger (GER) | Christoph Tromer (GER) | Megan Pascoe (GBR) |
| 2025 | Jeffrey Linton (USA) | Megan Pascoe (GBR) | Urs Infanger (SUI) |
| 2026 | Heiko Kröger (GER) | Frank Huth (NOR) | Kalle Dehler (GER) |
