= Yoann Richomme =

French navigator and yacht skipper

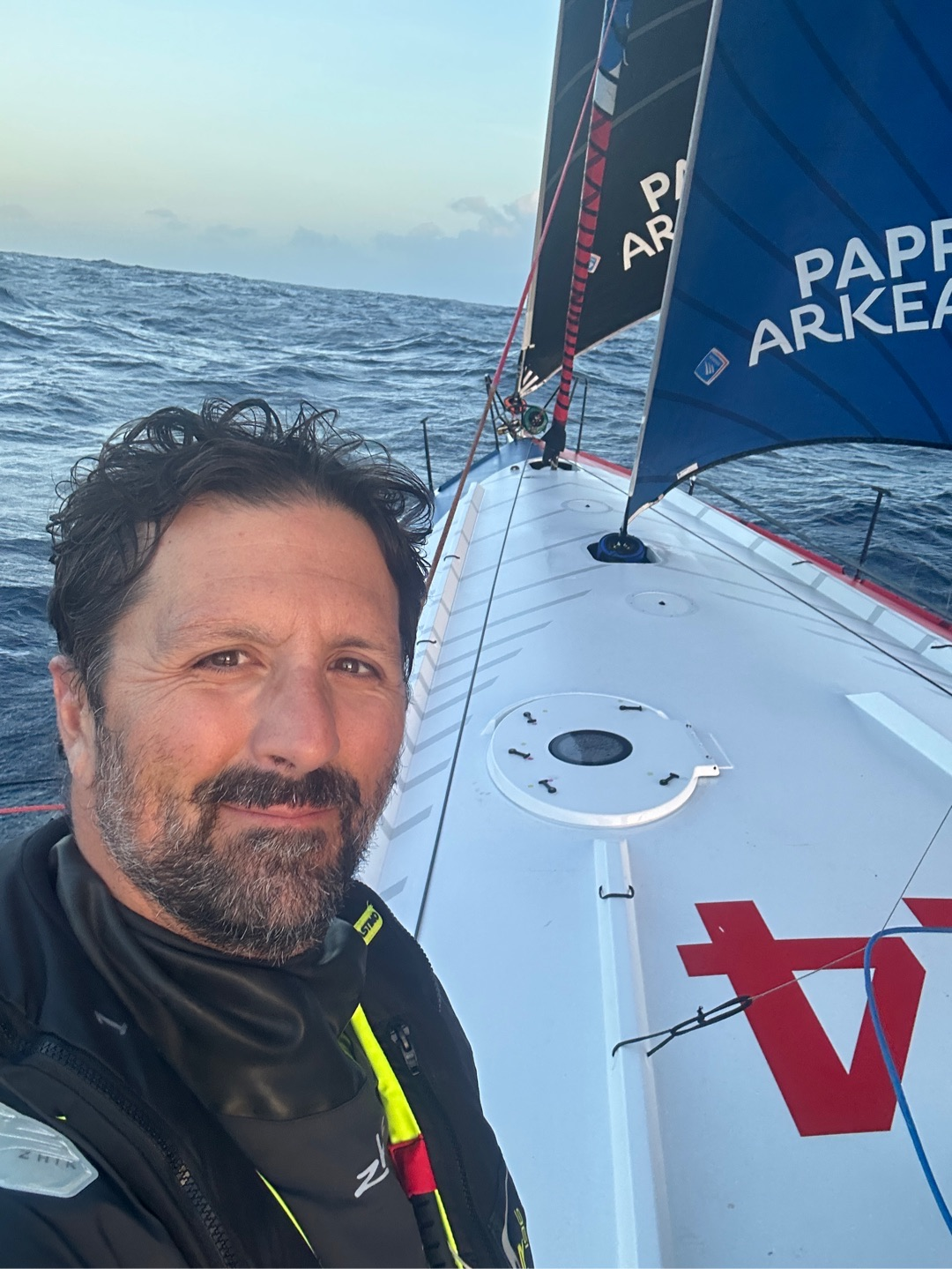
- Yoann Richomme aboard IMOCA Paprec Arkéa
- Born: 12 July 1983 (age 42); Frejus, France
- Known for: Sailing, yacht racing
- Website: www.yoannrichomme.fr

Yoann Richomme (born 12 July 1983 in Frejus) is a French navigator, sailor and yacht skipper. He has won the Solitaire du Figaro in 2016 and 2019 and the Route du Rhum in the Class 40 category in 2018 and 2022. In the Imoca class, he won the Retour à la Base 2023 and The Transat 2024.

== Career ==
Richomme studied as a naval architect at Southampton Solent University, and was later involved in the development of the Beneteau Figaro 3 yacht.

On 4 February 2020 it was announced that Richomme will skipper the Mirpuri Foundation Racing Team's 'Racing for the Planet' boat in the 2021 running of The Ocean Race. As such, Richomme will skipper the Mirpuri Foundation Racing Team's first full team entry in the race, having previously had involvement in the Turn the Tide on Plastic entry in the 2018 race.

With his sights set on competing in the Vendée Globe 2024-2025, he had an Imoca built, based on designs by Antoine Koch and the Finot-Conq firm. His two sponsors, the Arkéa and Paprec groups, set up a joint subsidiary in Lorient dedicated to their ocean racing project. Construction begins at Multiplast in Vannes in January 2022. The Imoca Paprec Arkéa is launched on February 22, 2023.

== Racing record ==
Pos	Year	Event	Time	Class	Boat name	Notes	Ref
Round the world races
2 / 40	2024	2024-2025 Vendee Globe	65d 18h 10m 02s	IMOCA 60	Paprec Arkéa (6)	Solo	
Trans Oceanic Races
1 / 33	2024	The Transat CIC 2024	8d 6h 53m 32s	IMOCA 60	Paprec Arkea (6)		
7 / 38	2024	Transat New York Vendée	12d 11h 11min 19s	IMOCA 60	Paprec Arkea (6)	Solo	
2	2023	2023 Transat Jacques Vabre	12d 01h 41m 16s	IMOCA 60	Paprec Arkea (6)	Yann Ellis (FRA)	
1 / 55	2022	2022 Route du Rhum	14d 03h 08m 40s	Class 40	FRA182 Paprec Arkea; Lift V2		
14 / 29	2019	2019 Transat Jacques Vabre	15d 08h 17m 21s	IMOCA 60	Groupe Apicil	with Damien Seguin (FRA)	
ABN	2018	Transat AG2R		Figaro 2	MACIF	with Martin Le Pape	
1 / 52	2018	2018 Route du Rhum	16d 03h 22m 44s	Class 40	FRA 154 Veedol-AIC; Lombard		
10 / 13	2017	2017 Transat Jacques Vabre	16d 05h 20m 21s	IMOCA 60	Vivo a Beira	Pierre Lacaze (FRA)	
ABN	2016	Transat AG2R		Figaro 2	MACIF	with Charlie Dalin	
2	2014	Transat AG2R		Figaro 2	MACIF	Fabien Delahaye	
7 / 26	2013	2013 Transat Jacques Vabre	22d 12h 14m 14s	IMOCA 60	FRA 131 ERDF - Des pieds et des mains Akilaria RC3	with Damien Seguin (FRA)	
2 / 16	2011	2011 Transat Jacques Vabre	22d 03h 02m 00s	IMOCA 60	FRA 52 eRDF – Des pieds et des mains	with Damien Seguin (FRA)	
World Championships
4th	2010	Mumm 30 World Championship		Farr 30	St Laurent de Maintenance	Crewed	
5th	2008	J/80 World Championship		J/80		Crew helmed by Kevin Sproul (GBR)	
8th	2007	Mumm 30 World Championship		Farr 30	Espoir IDF	Crewed	
7th	2007	J/80 World Championship		J/80		Crew helmed by Kevin Sproul (GBR)	
3rd	2006	J/80 World Championship		J/80		Crew helmed by Kevin Sproul (GBR)	
176	2001	Splash World Championship		Splash (dinghy)			

=== The Figaro Bénéteau Class ===
Pos	Year	Event	Time	Class	Boat name	Notes	Ref
1	2019	Solitaire du Figaro		Figaro 3	Hellowork - Groupe Telegramme	Solo	
1	2016	Solitaire du Figaro		Figaro 2	MACIF	Solo	
2	2016	Championnat de France de Course au Large Elite		Figaro 2	MACIF	Solo	
3	2015	Générali Solo		Figaro 2	MACIF	Solo	
3	2015	Championnat de France de Course au Large Elite		Figaro 2	MACIF	Solo	
3	2015	Tour de Bretagne		Figaro 2	MACIF	Quentin Delapierre	
9	2015	Solitaire du Figaro		Figaro 2	MACIF	Solo	
19	2014	Solitaire du Figaro		Figaro 2	MACIF	Solo	
2	2013	Championnat de France de Course au Large Elite		Figaro 2	DLBC	Solo	
4	2013	Solitaire du Figaro		Figaro 2	DLBC	Solo	
5	2013	Transat Bretagne - Martinique		Figaro 2	DLBC - Module Création	Solo	
19	2012	Solitaire du Figaro		Figaro 2	DLBC	Solo	
26	2011	Solitaire du Figaro		Figaro 2	DLBC	Solo	
19	2010	Solitaire du Figaro		Figaro 2	DLBC	Solo (2nd Rookie)	
1	2010	Transmanche		Figaro 2	DLBC	Solo	

=== Class 40 ===
Year	Competition	Team	Finishing Position	Partner
2022	Route du Rhum	Paprec Arkéa (#182	1st	Solo
2022	Drheam Cup 2022	Paprec Arkéa (#182)	4th	Solo
2018	Route du Rhum	VEEDOL - AIC	1st	Solo
2018	Drheam Cup 2018	VEEDOL - AIC	1st	Solo
2013	Transat Jacques Vabre	ERDF - Des Pieds et des Mains	7th	with Damien Seguin (FRA)
2011	Transat Jacques Vabre	Des pieds et des Mains	2nd	with Damien Seguin (FRA)
2011	Normandy Channel Race	Des pieds et des Mains	3rd	with Damien Seguin (FRA)

=== IMOCA 60 ===
Year	Competition	Team	Finishing Position	Partner	Ref
2024	New York Vendée 2024	Paprec Arkéa (6)	7th	Solo	
2024	The Transat 2024	Paprec Arkéa (6)	1st	Solo	
2023	Retour à la Base 2023	Paprec Arkéa (6)	1st	Solo	
2023	Transat Jacques Vabre 2023	Paprec Arkéa (6)	2nd	with Yann Eliès (FRA)	
2023	24h Le Defi Azimut	Paprec Arkéa (6)	4th	with Yann Eliès (FRA)	
2023	Fastnet Race	Paprec Arkéa (6)	2nd	with Yann Eliès (FRA)	
2023	Guyader Bermudes 1000	Paprec Arkéa (6)	4th	with Yann Eliès (FRA)	
2019	Transat Jacques Vabre	Groupe Apicil	15th	with Damien Seguin (FRA)	
2017	Transat Jacques Vabre	Vivo A Beira	10th	with Pierre Lacaze (FRA)	
2012	Europa Race	PRB	1st	with Vincent Riou (FRA)	

=== IRC ===
Year	Competition	Team	Finishing Position	Partner
2017	Spi Ouest France	Spirit of Spineck	2nd	Crewed
2014	ARC	Captain Blind	3rd	Crewed
2010	Tour de Corse à la Voile	Captain Blind	1st	Crewed
2010	Round Ireland Yacht Race	Inish Mor	2nd	Crewed
2009	ARC	Captain Blind	2nd	Crewed
2009	Fastnet Race	Captain Blind	2nd	Crewed
2009	Giraglia Rolex Cup	Paprec	2nd	Crewed
2008	Copa Del Rey	Ngoni	1st	Crewed

=== Farr 30 ===
Year	Competition	Team	Finishing Position	Partner
2010	World Championship	St Laurent de Maintenance	4th	Crewed
2008	Routes des iles	Elcimai	1st	Crewed
2007	World Championship	Espoir IDF	8th	Crewed
2005	Tour de France à la voile			Crewed
2004	Tour de France à la voile			Crewed
2003	Tour de France à la voile			Crewed

=== J/80 ===
Year	Competition	Team	Finishing Position	Partner
2008	World Championship		5th	Crew helmed by Kevin Sproul (GBR)
2007	World Championship		7th	Crew helmed by Kevin Sproul (GBR)
2006	European Championship		4th	Crew helmed by Kevin Sproul (GBR)
2006	World Championship		3rd	Crew helmed by Kevin Sproul (GBR)
