= Brian MacDonald (sailor) =

Canadian sailor

Personal information
- Born: December 3, 1943 (age 82) Vancouver, British Columbia, Canada
Medal record
Sailing
Representing Canada
Paralympic Games
Bronze medal – third place	2000 Sydney	Mixed Three Person Sonar

Brian MacDonald (born December 3, 1943) is a Canadian sailor and Paralympic bronze medalist.

He competed in sailing at the 2000 Summer Paralympics in Sydney, where he won the bronze medal at the mixed three person sonar event, with team members David Williams and Paul Tingley. At the 2004 Games in Athens, he finished seventh, with team members Brian Mackie and Paul Tingley.

He was awarded the Canadian Yachting Association's Male Athlete of the Year Award together with David Williams, Paul Tingley, and Jamie Whitman in 2000.
