= Damien Seguin =

French sailor

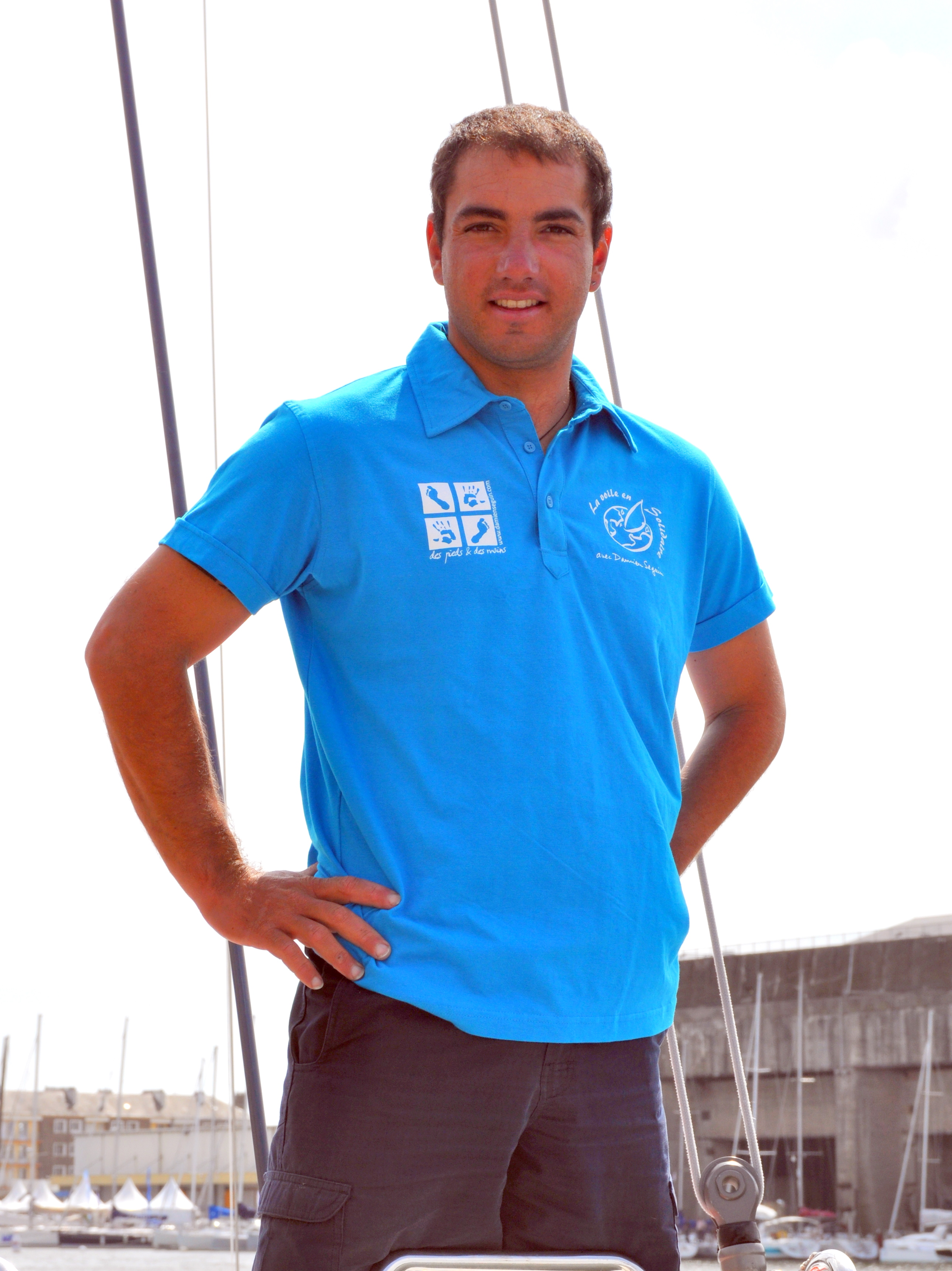

Personal information
- Nationality: French
- Born: 3 September 1979 (age 46) Briançon (Hautes-Alpes)

Sailing career
- Sport: Sailing
- Class(es): 2.4 Metre, IMOCA 60

Damien Seguin (born 3 September 1979 in Briançon) is a French sailor. He is a paralympic champion and was a nominee for World Sailing - World Sailor of the Year Awards. With sailing no longer on the Paralympic agenda, he has pursued offshore yacht racing, competing in the 2020–2021 Vendée Globe, a solo round-the-world race.

== Sailing Highlights ==
=== Paralympics ===
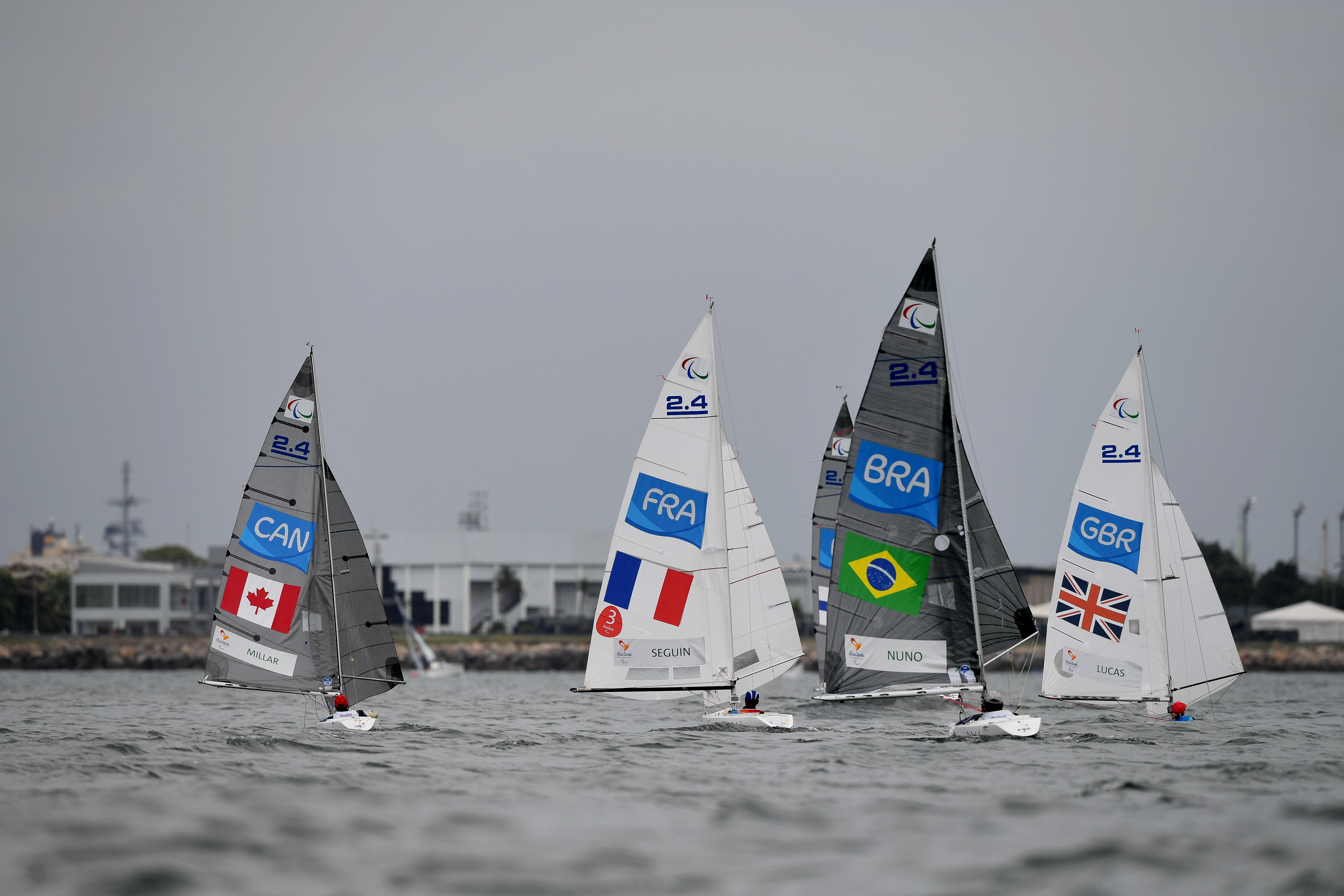

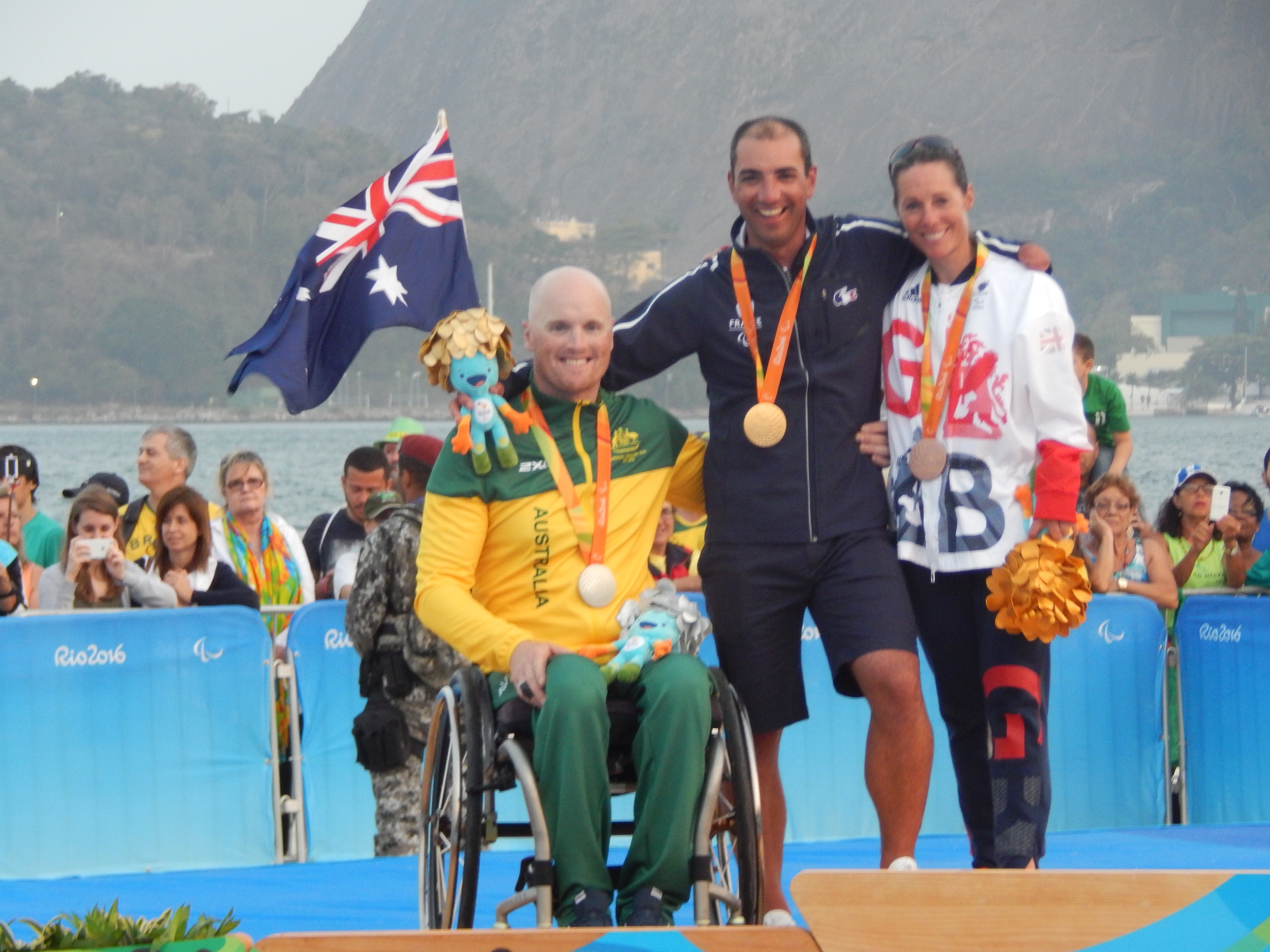

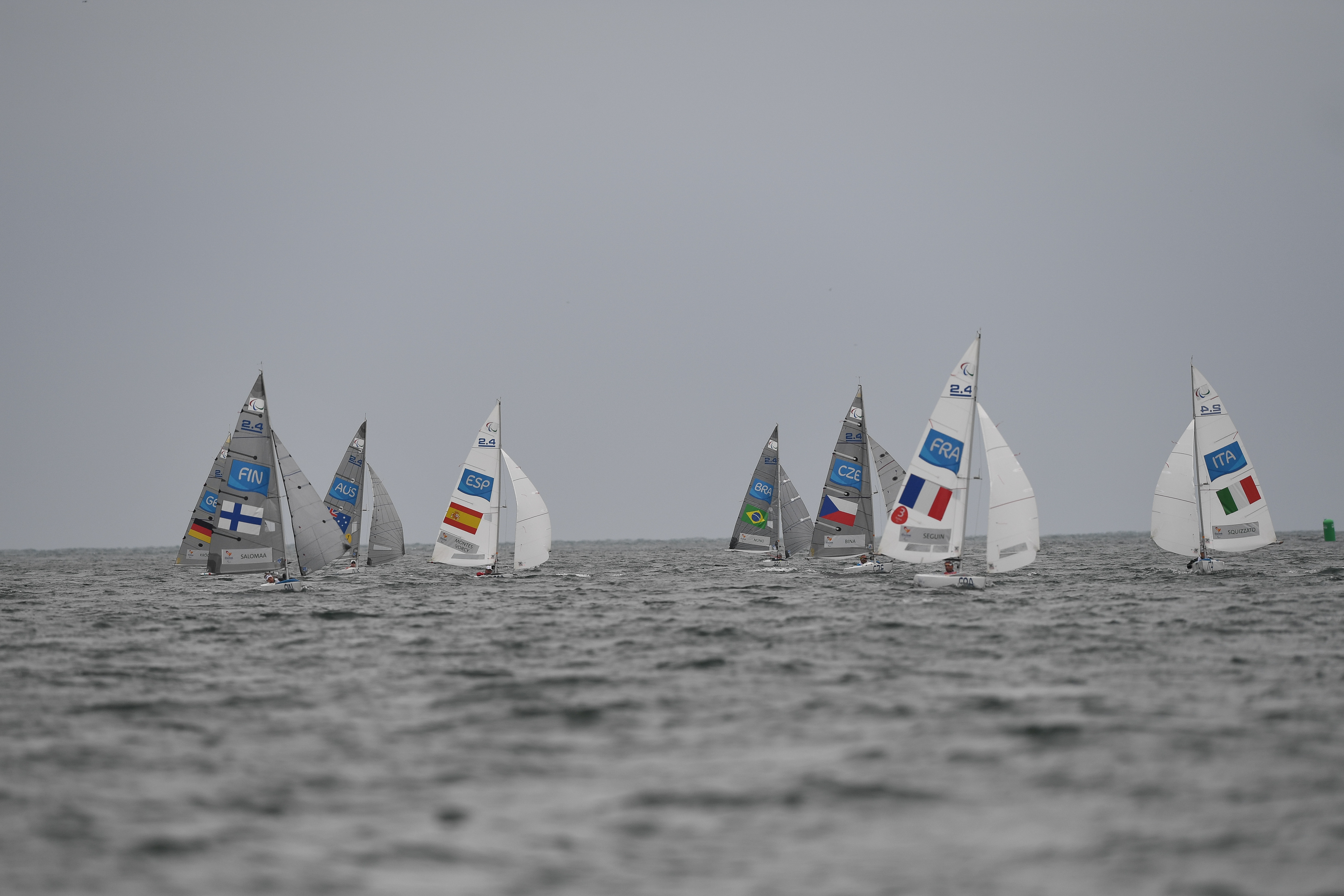

Pos.	Class	Edition	Location	Venue	Ref.
1st	2.4 Metre	2016 Rio Paralympic Games	Rio, BRA	Marina da Glória	
4th	2.4 Metre	2012 London Paralympic Games	Weymouth and Portland, GBR	Weymouth and Portland National Sailing Academy	
2nd	2.4 Metre	2008 Beijing Paralympic Games	Qingdao, Shandong province, CHN	Qingdao International Sailing Centre	
1st	2.4 Metre	2004 Athens Paralympic Games	Athens, GRE	Agios Kosmas Olympic Sailing Centre	

=== World Championships ===
Pos.	Year	Event	Class	Location	Notes	Ref.
1	2019	Para World Sailing Championships	2.4 Metre	Cádiz, ESP		
2	2018	Para World Sailing Championship	2.4 Metre	Sheboygan, USA		
3	2017	Para World Sailing Championship	2.4 Metre	Kiel, GER		
2	2016	Disabled Sailing World Champion	2.4 Metre	Medemblik, NED		
1	2015	Disabled Sailing World Championship	2.4 Metre	Melbourne, AUS		
3	2014	IFDS Combined World Championships	2.4 Metre	Royal Nova Scotia Yacht Squadron, CAN		
3	2013	IFDS Disabled Sailing World Championships	2.4 Metre	Kinsale, IRL		
10	2012	Class 40 World Championship	Class40		ERDF DES PIEDS ET DES MAINS	
1	2012	IFDS Disabled Sailing World Championships	2.4 Metre	Florida, USA		
7	2011	IFDS Disabled Sailing World Championships	2.4 Metre	Weymouth, GBR		
9	2011	Class 40 World Championship	Class40		ERDF DES PIEDS ET DES MAINS	
5	2010	IFDS Disabled Sailing World Championships	2.4 Metre	Medemblik, NED		
1	2007	IFDS Disabled Sailing World Championships	2.4 Metre	Rochester, USA		
1	2005	IFDS Disabled Sailing World Championships	2.4 Metre	Sonderborg Yacht Club, DEN		
2	2003	IFDS Single Person Keelboat World Championship	2.4 Metre	Athens, GRE		
2	2002	IFDS Disabled Sailing World Championships	2.4 Metre	Medemblik, NED		
2	2008	2.4 Metre World Championship	2.4 Metre			
2	2003	2.4 Metre World Championship	2.4 Metre	Kieler Bay, GER		
2	1998	Youth Hobie 16 World Championships	Hobie 16	Sotogrande, ESP		
27	2001	Formula 18 World Championship	Formula 18	Parkstone YC, Poole, GBR		
30	2000	Formula 18 World Championship	Formula 18	Erquy, FRA		
45	1999	Tornado World Championship	Tornado	Vallensbaek, DEN		

=== Offshore Sailing ===
After sailing was removed from the paralympic sailing competition Damien focused on Oceanic short handed sailing having sailing the feeder Class 40 leading to him competing in an IMOCA 60 in the 2020–2021 Vendée Globe.

Pos.	Year	Event	Class	Boat	Notes	Ref.
Round the World Race
15 / 40	2024	2024-2025 Vendee Globe	IMOCA 60	Groupe Apicil (2)	84d 20h 31m 48s	
7 / 33	2020	2020-2021 Vendee Globe	IMOCA 60	Groupe Apicil	80d 21h 58m 20s	
Trans Oceanic Races
15	2023	2023 Transat Jacques Vabre	IMOCA 60	Groupe Apicil (2)	with Laurent Bourgues (FRA)	
11	2021	2021 Transat Jacques Vabre	IMOCA 60	Groupe Apicil	with Benjamin Dutreux (FRA)	
10	2020	Défi Azimut	IMOCA 60	Groupe Apicil		
RET	2020	Vendée-Arctique-Les Sables d'Olonne	IMOCA 60	Groupe Apicil		
5	2019	Défi Azimut	IMOCA 60	Groupe Apicil		
16	2019	Rolex Fastnet Race				
11	2019	Bermudes 1000 Race	IMOCA 60	Groupe Apicil		
14	2019	2019 Transat Jacques Vabre	IMOCA 60	Groupe Apicil	with Yoann Richomme (FRA)	
6	2018	Route du Rhum				
7	2013	Transat Jacques Vabre	Class40	ERDF - Des Pieds et des Mains	with Yoann Richomme (FRA)	
2	2011	Transat Jacques Vabre	Class40	Des pieds et des Mains	with Yoann Richomme (FRA)	
8	2014	Route du Rhum	Class40			
10	2010	Route du Rhum	Class40			
14	2006	Transat AG2r	Beneteau Figaro 2	DES PIEDS ET DES MAINS	with Denis Lemaitre	
Other Races
3	2018	Bermudes 1000 Race				
4	2018	Dhream Cup 700				
1	2017	Tour de France à la Voile	Diam 24			
19	2016	Tour de France à la Voile	Diam 24	FONDATION FDJ - DES PIEDS ET DES MAINS		
19	2015	Tour de France à la Voile	Diam 24	FONDATION FDJ - DES PIEDS ET DES MAINS		
3	2011	Normandy Channel Race	Class40	Des pieds et des Mains	with Yoann Richomme (FRA)	
