= Sailing at the 2004 Summer Paralympics =

Sailing at the XII Paralympic Games
- Paralympic Sailing
- Venue: Agios Kosmas Olympic Sailing Centre
- Dates: 18–23 September 2004
- Competitors: 61 Male Sailors; 1 Female Sailors; 21 Nations; 31 Boats

Sailing at the 2004 Summer Paralympics took place at the Agios Kosmas Olympic Sailing Centre from September 18-September 23. The sailors were a mix of physically and visually impaired men and women competing together.

The classes sailed were:

- 2.4mR single-handed keelboat
- Sonar three person keelboat

== Medal table ==
Rank	Nation	Gold	Silver	Bronze	Total
1	France (FRA)	1	0	0	1
1	Israel (ISR)	1	0	0	1
3	Netherlands (NED)	0	1	1	2
3	United States (USA)	0	1	1	2
Totals (4 entries)		2	2	2	6

== Medal summary ==
Event	Gold	Silver	Bronze
Mixed 2.4mR (1-Person)	Damien Seguin; France	Thomas Brown; United States	Thierry Schmitter; Netherlands
Mixed Sonar (3-Person)	Israel (ISR); Dror Cohen; Arnon Efrati; Benni Vexler	Netherlands (NED); Udo Hessels; Marcel van de Veen; Mischa Rossen	United States (USA); John Ross Duggan; Jean Paul Creignou; Bradley Johnson

== Results ==
=== One Person Keelboat - 2.4 Metre ===
Position	Nation	Athlete	Race										Points	
Position	Nation	Athlete	1	2	3	4	5	6	7	8	9	10	Tot	Net
Gold medal	France	Damien Seguin	1	1	4	5	1	-6	3	2	4		27	21
Silver medal	United States	Thomas Brown	4	2	1	1	5	5	1	3	-10		32	22
Bronze medal	Netherlands	Thierry Schmitter	3	3	2	-6	3	4	4	1	5		31	25
4	Germany	Heiko Kröger	2	4	3	3	7	(DSQ)	6	5	1		48	31
5	Australia	Peter Thompson	-10	5	5	4	9	2	2	8	3		48	38
6	Denmark	Jens Als Andersen	5	7	8	8	2	1	5	-9	7		52	43
7	Norway	Bjornar Erikstad	7	6	9	2	6	3	(OCS)	4	9		63	46
8	Great Britain	Allan Smith	9	10	7	7	4	7	8	-12	2		66	54
9	Canada	Bruce Millar	6	8	-12	9	8	8	7	6	8		72	60
10	Finland	Antero Karjalainen	-13	11	10	11	10	9	11	10	6		91	78
11	Spain	Joaquin Quero	8	13	-14	10	11	10	10	11	11		98	84
12	Italy	Fabrizio Olmi	12	12	11	12	-13	11	9	7	13		100	87
13	Greece	Stamatis Kalligeris	11	9	6	13	12	12	(OCS)	13	14		107	90
14	Japan	Masakazu Suto	-15	15	13	14	15	13	12	14	12		123	108
15	Ireland	Feargal Kinsella	14	14	15	15	14	15	13	15	-16		131	115
16	Singapore	Kok Liang Lim	-16	16	16	16	16	14	14	16	15		139	123
	Reference													

=== Open Three-Person Keelboat - Sonar ===
Pos	Nation	Sailor		Race										Points	
Pos	Nation	Sailor		1	2	3	4	5	6	7	8	9	10	Tot	Net
1	Israel	Helm	Dror Cohen	1	(DSQ)	4	1	4	4	3	1	1		35	19
1	Israel	Mid	Arnon Efrati	1	(DSQ)	4	1	4	4	3	1	1		35	19
1	Israel	Bow	Benny Vexler	1	(DSQ)	4	1	4	4	3	1	1		35	19
2	Netherlands	Helm	Udo Hessels	-6	4	5	4	2	3	2	2	6		34	28
2	Netherlands	Mid	Marcel Van De Veen	-6	4	5	4	2	3	2	2	6		34	28
2	Netherlands	Bow	Mischa Rossen	-6	4	5	4	2	3	2	2	6		34	28
3	United States	Helm	John Ross-Duggan	3	1	3	6	6	6	7	5	-10		47	37
3	United States	Mid	Jean-Paul Creignou	3	1	3	6	6	6	7	5	-10		47	37
3	United States	Bow	Bradley Johnson	3	1	3	6	6	6	7	5	-10		47	37
4	Germany	Helm	Jens Kroker	-9	8	2	2	3	1	6	7	9		47	38
4	Germany	Mid	Peter Reichl	-9	8	2	2	3	1	6	7	9		47	38
4	Germany	Bow	Olaf Jacobs	-9	8	2	2	3	1	6	7	9		47	38
5	Australia	Helm	Jamie Dunross	2	6	6	5	7	2	8	-10	8		54	44
5	Australia	Mid	Jeffery Robert Milligan	2	6	6	5	7	2	8	-10	8		54	44
5	Australia	Bow	Colin Harrison	2	6	6	5	7	2	8	-10	8		54	44
6	Great Britain	Helm	John Robertson	11	2	9	(OCS)	1	10	9	4	3		65	49
6	Great Britain	Mid	Stephen Thomas	11	2	9	(OCS)	1	10	9	4	3		65	49
6	Great Britain	Bow	Hannah Stodel	11	2	9	(OCS)	1	10	9	4	3		65	49
7	Canada	Helm	Brian Mackie	7	-10	1	9	10	8	4	3	7		59	49
7	Canada	Mid	Brian Macdonald	7	-10	1	9	10	8	4	3	7		59	49
7	Canada	Bow	Paul Tingley	7	-10	1	9	10	8	4	3	7		59	49
8	Greece	Helm	Vasileios Christoforou	8	-12	11	7	5	9	1	8	2		63	51
8	Greece	Mid	Georgios Delikouras	8	-12	11	7	5	9	1	8	2		63	51
8	Greece	Bow	Nikolaos Paterakis	8	-12	11	7	5	9	1	8	2		63	51
9	Ireland	Helm	John Twomey	10	9	10	3	8	-11	5	11	4		71	60
9	Ireland	Mid	Seanie Mcgrath	10	9	10	3	8	-11	5	11	4		71	60
9	Ireland	Bow	Brian O'Mahony	10	9	10	3	8	-11	5	11	4		71	60
10	Sweden	Helm	Carl-Gustaf Fresk	-13	11	8	8	9	7	10	13	5		84	71
10	Sweden	Mid	Boerje Palmqvist	-13	11	8	8	9	7	10	13	5		84	71
10	Sweden	Bow	Lars Loefstroem	-13	11	8	8	9	7	10	13	5		84	71
11	Norway	Helm	Jostein Stordahl	4	3	12	10	12	13	(DSQ)	6	12		88	72
11	Norway	Mid	Aleksander Wang-Hansen	4	3	12	10	12	13	(DSQ)	6	12		88	72
11	Norway	Bow	Per Eugen Kristiansen	4	3	12	10	12	13	(DSQ)	6	12		88	72
12	Spain	Helm	Enrique Vives	5	7	7	12	13	5	11	12	(DSQ)		88	72
12	Spain	Mid	Francisco Perez Rodenas	5	7	7	12	13	5	11	12	(DSQ)		88	72
12	Spain	Bow	Jose Maria Lastra	5	7	7	12	13	5	11	12	(DSQ)		88	72
13	Poland	Helm	Piotr Nowak	12	5	-13	11	11	12	12	9	11		96	83
13	Poland	Mid	Krzysztof Kwapiszewski	12	5	-13	11	11	12	12	9	11		96	83
13	Poland	Bow	Andrzej Puchalski	12	5	-13	11	11	12	12	9	11		96	83
14	Singapore	Helm	Wei Qiang Jovin Tan	14	14	14	13	-15	14	13	15	13		125	110
14	Singapore	Mid	Chen Ian Leo	14	14	14	13	-15	14	13	15	13		125	110
14	Singapore	Bow	Sulaiman Bin Pungot	14	14	14	13	-15	14	13	15	13		125	110
15	Japan	Helm	Yoko Sone	(DNF)	13	15	14	14	15	14	14	14		129	113
15	Japan	Mid	Kazunori Murasawa	(DNF)	13	15	14	14	15	14	14	14		129	113
15	Japan	Bow	Tsuneo Aso	(DNF)	13	15	14	14	15	14	14	14		129	113
