= Allan Smith (sailor) =

British Paralympic sailor

Personal information
- Nationality: British

Sailing career
- Sport: Sailing
- Classes: 2.4 Metre, SKUD 18

Allan Smith is a British Paralympic sailor who competed at the 2004 Paralympic Games in the 2.4 Metre class. He finished eighth in the event. Smith and Jackie Gay attempted to qualify for the 2008 Paralympics in the SKUD-18 class, but failed to do so. Alexandra Rickham and Niki Birrell went on to represent team GB at these Paralympics, finishing fifth.
