= Sailing at the 2000 Summer Paralympics =

Sailing at the XI Paralympic Games
- Paralympic Sailing
- Venue: Sydney
- Competitors: 61 Male Sailors; 1 Female Sailors; 22 Nations; 32 Boats

Paralympic symbol (1994-2004)

Sailing at the 2000 Summer Paralympics consisted of two mixed events.

== Medal summary ==
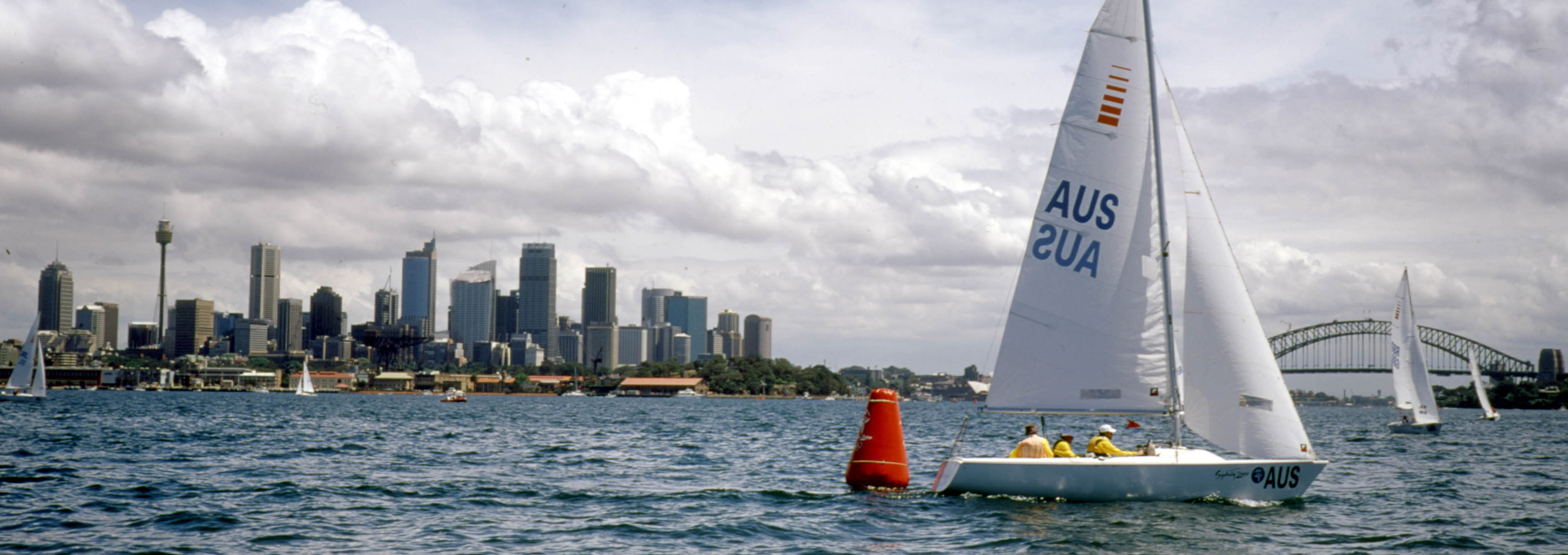
Panoramic view of the paralympic sailing venue, Sydney Harbour, during competition at the 2000 Summer Paralympics. Members of the Australian Paralympic Sailing team with their boat can be seen in the foreground. The Sydney Harbour Bridge, Sydney Tower and the CBD can be seen in the background.

Event	Gold	Silver	Bronze
Single person 2.4mr	Heiko Kröger; Germany	Jens Als Andersen; Denmark	Thomas Brown; United States
Three person Sonar	Australia (AUS); Noel Robins; Jamie Dunross; Graeme Martin	Germany (GER); Peter Reichl; Peter Muenter; Jens Kroker	Canada (CAN); David Williams; Paul Tingley; Brian MacDonald

== Results ==
=== One Person Keelboat - 2.4 Metre ===
Rank	Athlete	Race										Points	
Rank	Athlete	1	2	3	4	5	6	7	8	9	10	Tot	Net
Gold medal	Heiko Kroeger (GER)												10
Silver medal	Jens Als Andersen (DEN)												15
Bronze medal	Thomas Brown (USA)												24
4	Peter Thompson (AUS)												25
5	Philippe Balle (FRA)												26
6	Andrew May (NZL)												37
7	Mike Browne (GBR)												45
8	Jussi Mattila (FIN)												53
9	Jostein Stordahl (NOR)												56
10	Marco Turbiglio (ITA)												62
11	Dan McCoy (CAN)												69
12	Claes Hultling (SWE)												75
13	Emilio Fernandez (ESP)												77
14	Matias Paillot (ARG)												87
15	Priidik Mentaal (EST)												94
16	Masakazu Suto (JPN)												99
17	Russell Vollmer (RSA)												102

=== Open Three-Person Keelboat - Sonar ===
Rank	Nation (skipper first)	Race										Points	
Rank	Nation (skipper first)	1	2	3	4	5	6	7	8	9	10	Tot	Net
Gold medal	Graeme Martin, Jamie Dunross and Noel Robins (AUS)												4
Silver medal	Jens Kroker, Peter Muenter and Peter Reichl (GER)												20
Bronze medal	Paul Tingley, David Williams and Brian MacDonald (CAN)												22
4	Carl-Gustaf Fresk, Jan Olaf Edbom and Lars Loedstroem (SWE)												33
5	Andrew Cassell, Andrew Millband and Brian Harding (GBR)												37
6	Udo Hessels; Geert Ruesink; Mischa Rossen (NED)												38
7	Corky Aucreman; Keith Burhans and Paul Callahan (USA)												41
8	Dor Cohen, Amon Efrati and Gadi Spector (ISR)												43
9	Paul McGrath, Sean McGrath and John Twomey (IRL)												43
10	Garush Danielyan, Stasik Nazaryan and Mher Avanesyan (ARM)												58
11	Enrique Vives, Per Eugen Kristiansen and José Maria Lastra (ESP)												66
12	Aleksander Wang-Hansen, Knut Kerrem and Cato Zahl Pedersen (NOR)												70
13	Anne Othenn-Girad, Georges Scherler and Philippe Moerch (SUI)												74
14	Phil Edwards, Garth Reynolds and Marty Clark (NZL)												81
15	Masao Hasegawa, Miho Hamada and Meiko Kasai (JPN)												98

== Medal table ==
Rank	Nation	Gold	Silver	Bronze	Total
1	Germany (GER)	1	1	0	2
2	Australia (AUS)	1	0	0	1
3	Denmark (DEN)	0	1	0	1
4	Canada (CAN)	0	0	1	1
4	United States (USA)	0	0	1	1
Totals (5 entries)		2	2	2	6
