= IMOCA 60 Paprec 6 =

Paprec Arkéa (6)
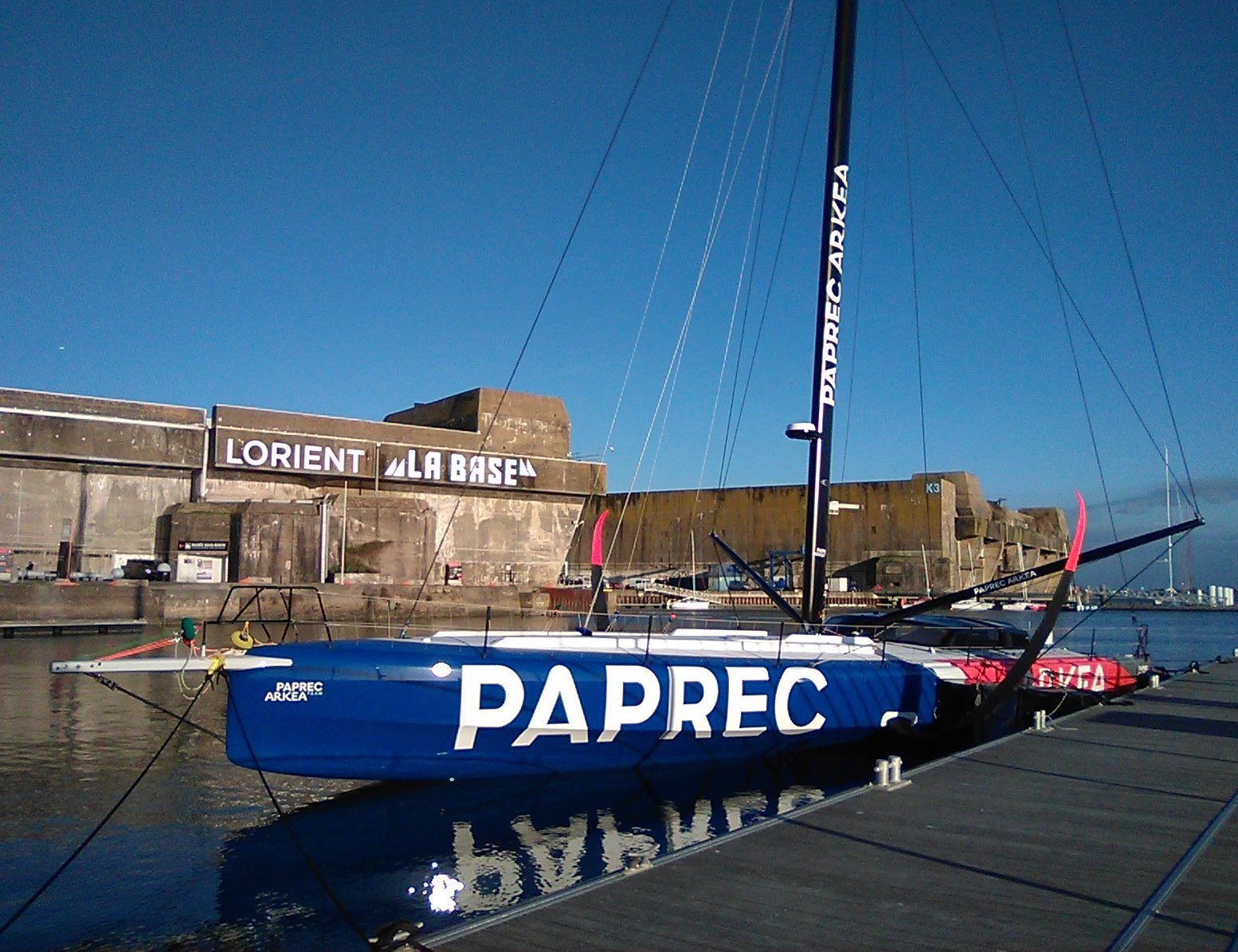

Development
- Designer: Antoine Koch and Finot-Conq
- Year: 22 February 2023
- Name: Paprec Arkéa (6)

Hull appendages
- General: two rudders, two foils
- Keel: canting keel

Racing
- Class association: IMOCA 60

Paprec Arkéa (6) is an IMOCA 60 monohull sailing yacht, designed by Antoine Koch and Finot-Conq built by Multiplast in France for Team Spirit Racing and launched on 22 February 2023. It was designed for the Vendée Globe 2024, a non-stop, round the world solo race. Its skipper is the French offshore sailor Yoann Richomme.

== Design ==
Sister-ship to For People. The boat features a fully enclosed cockpit with a shock absorbing seat. The hull is optimised for the downwind conditions of the southern ocean, but maintaining a slim design.

== Racing results ==
Pos	Year	Race	Class	Boat name	(Co-)Skipper	Configuration, Time, Notes	Ref
Round the World Races
2 / 40	2025	2024-2025 Vendée Globe	IMOCA 60	Paprec Arkéa (6)	Yoann Richomme (FRA)	solo;	
Transatlantic Races
6	2024	Transat New York Vendée	IMOCA 60	Paprec Arkéa (6)	Yoann Richomme (FRA)	solo; 12d 11h 11m 19s	
1	2024	The Transat CIC	IMOCA 60	Paprec Arkéa (6)	Yoann Richomme (FRA)	solo; 8d 06h 53m 32s	
1	2023	Retour à la base	IMOCA 60	Paprec Arkéa (6)	Yoann Richomme (FRA)	solo; 9d 00h 03m 48s	
2	2023	Transat Jacques Vabre	IMOCA 60	Paprec Arkéa (6)	Yoann Richomme (FRA) Yann Eliès (FRA)	double handed; 12d 01h 41m 16s	
Other Races
4	2023	24h Le Defi Azimut	IMOCA 60	Paprec Arkéa (6)	Yoann Richomme (FRA) Yann Eliès (FRA)	double handed	
2	2023	Fastnet Race	IMOCA 60	Paprec Arkéa (6)	Yoann Richomme (FRA) Yann Eliès (FRA)	double handed	
4	2023	Guyader Bermudes 1000	IMOCA 60	Paprec Arkéa (6)	Yoann Richomme (FRA) Yann Eliès (FRA)	double handed	

== See also ==
- Yoann Richomme (skipper)
- Former boats of the same team:
  - Paprec
  - Paprec 2
  - Paprec 3
  - Paprec 4
  - Paprec 5
