= IMOCA 60 DCNS =

Sailboat

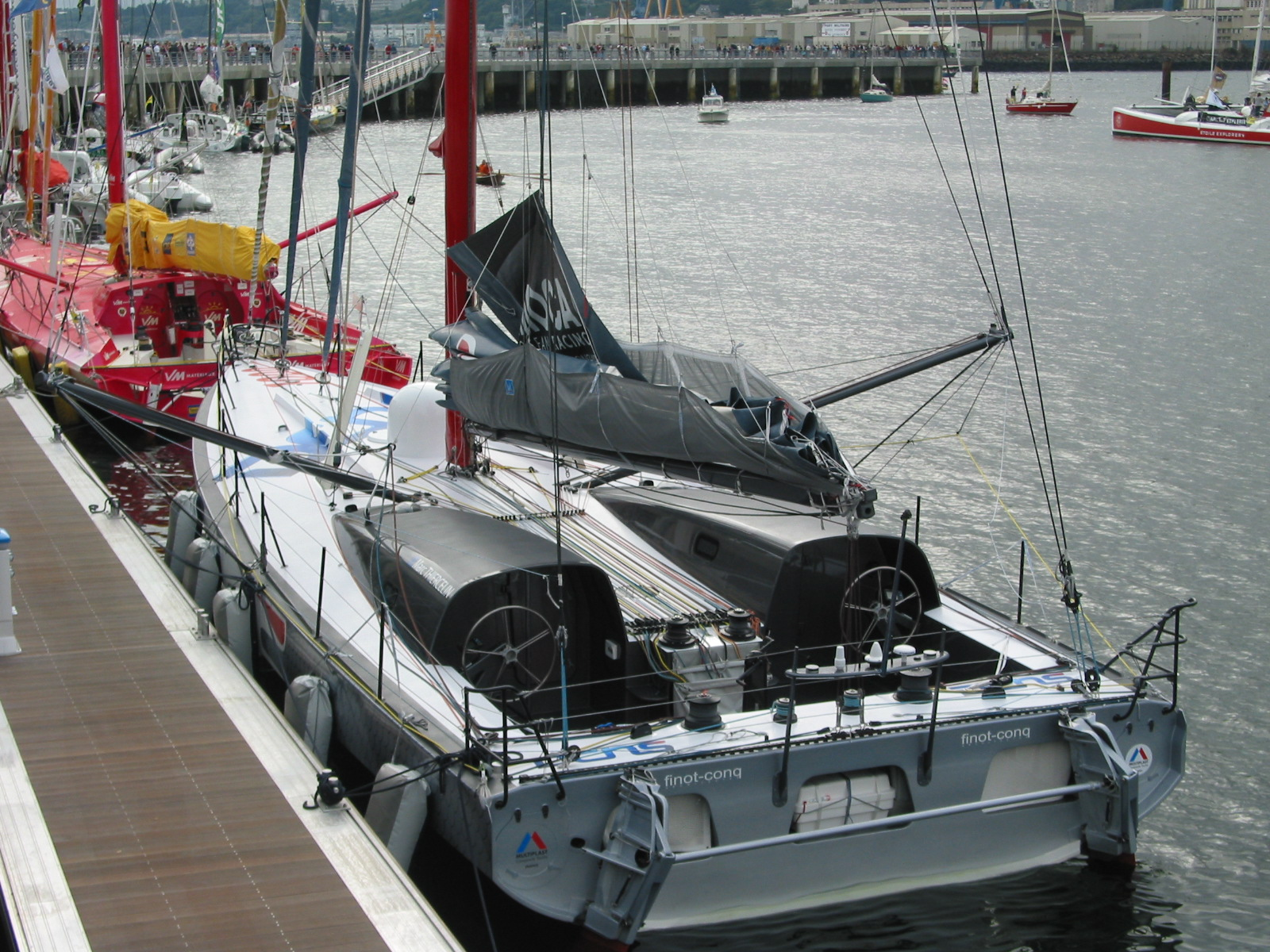

Development
- Designer: Finot-Conq, Group Finot, Pascal Conq
- Year: 29 May 2008
- Builder: Multiplast

Hull
- Hull weight: Carbon Sandwich

Hull appendages
- Keel: Canting Keel
- Ballast: Water Ballast
- Rudder: Twin Rudders

Rig
- Rig type: Sloop

Racing
- Class association: IMOCA 60

The IMOCA 60 class yacht DCNS was designed by Finot-Conq and launched in the 2008 after being built at Multiplast shipyard in Vannes (for the hull and assembly), with the deck made by the Larros shipyard in Arcachon.

== Names and ownership ==
DCNS (2008-2015 )

- Skipper: Marc Thiercelin / Christopher Pratt

Comme Un Seul Homme (2015-2017)

- Skipper: Éric Bellion
- Sail no.: FRA 1000

Groupe APICIL (2017-2021)

- Skipper: Damien Seguin
- Sail no.: FRA 1000

Banque Populaire (2022)

- Nicolas Lunven

Lazare (since 2022)

- Skipper: Tanguy Le Turquais
- Sail no.: FRA 1000

In December 2021 it was announced the boat had been acquired by Tanguy Le Turquais for a 2024-2025 Vendée Globe campaign.

== Racing results ==
Pos	Year	Race	Class	Boat name	Skipper	Notes	Ref
Round the world races
7 / 33	2020	2020–2021 Vendée Globe	IMOCA 60	Groupe Apecil	Damien Seguin (FRA)	80d 21h 58m	
9 / 29	2016	2016–2017 Vendée Globe	IMOCA 60		Eric Bellion (FRA)	99d 04h 56m	
DNF / 30	2008	2008–2009 Vendée Globe	IMOCA 60	DCNS	Marc Thiercelin (FRA) |day 4: dismasted		
Transatlantic Races
11 / 22	2021	Transat Jacques Vabre	IMOCA 60	Groupe Apecil	Damien Seguin (FRA); Benjamin Dutreux (FRA)	21d 07h 41m	
14 / 29	2019	Transat Jacques Vabre	IMOCA 60	Groupe Apecil	Damien Seguin (FRA); Yohann Richomme (FRA)		
6 / 20	2018	Route du Rhum	IMOCA 60	Groupe Apecil	Damien Seguin (FRA)	12d 07h 32m	
11 / 42	2015	Transat Jacques Vabre	IMOCA 60		Eric Bellion (FRA); Sam Goodchild (GBR)	19d 02h 15m	
DNF / 13	2011	Transat Jacques Vabre	IMOCA 60	DCNS	Marc Thiercelin (FRA); Luc Alphand (FRA)		
DNF / 14	2009	Transat Jacques Vabre	IMOCA 60	DCNS	Marc Thiercelin (FRA); Christopher Pratt (FRA)		
8 / 9	2009	Route du Rhum	IMOCA 60	DCNS	Christopher Pratt (FRA)	16d 07h 04m	
Other Races
10	2022	Vendée Arctique	IMOCA 60	Banque Populaire	Nicolas Lunven (FRA)	5d 10h 42m 55s	

== Gallery ==
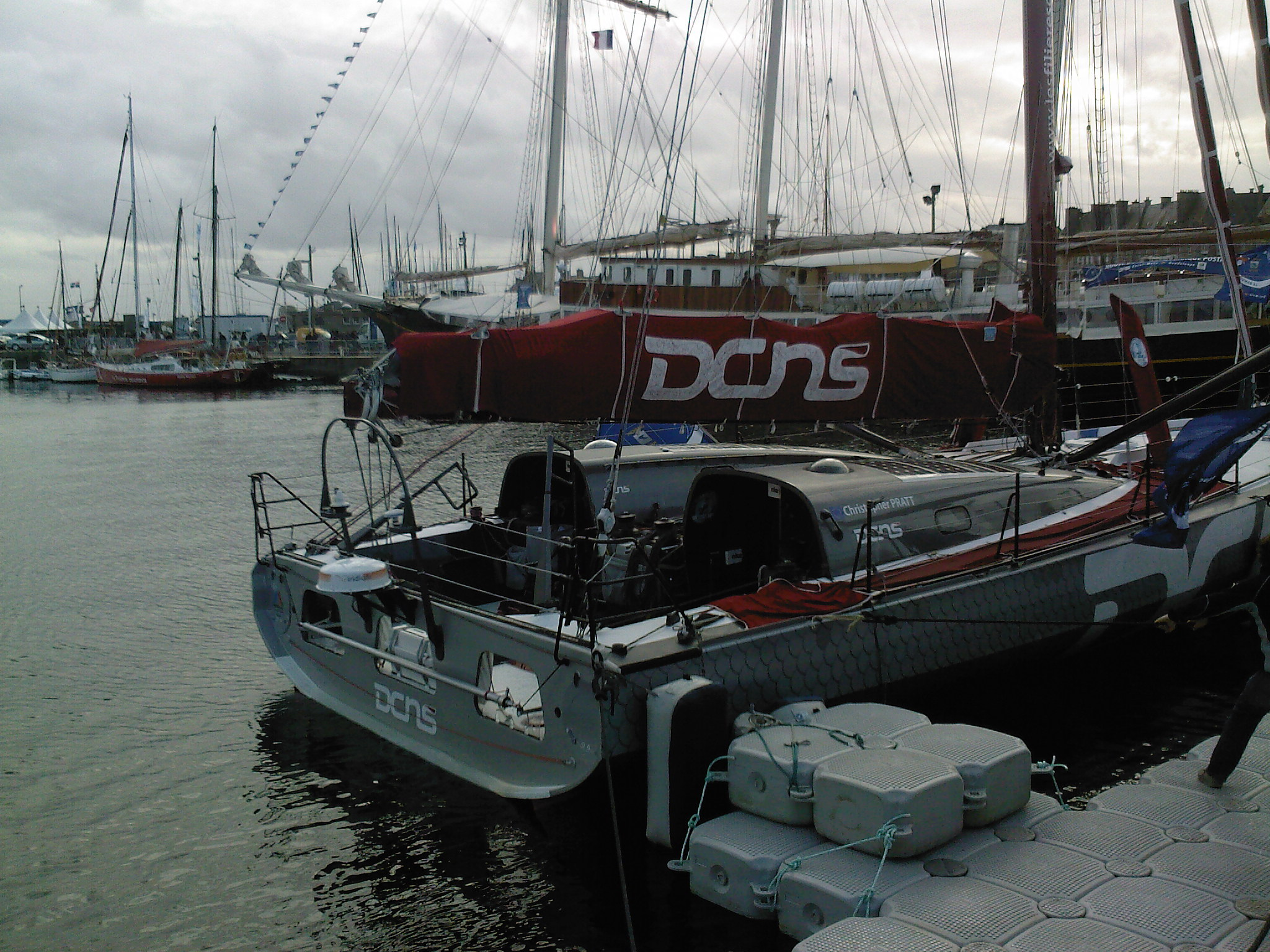

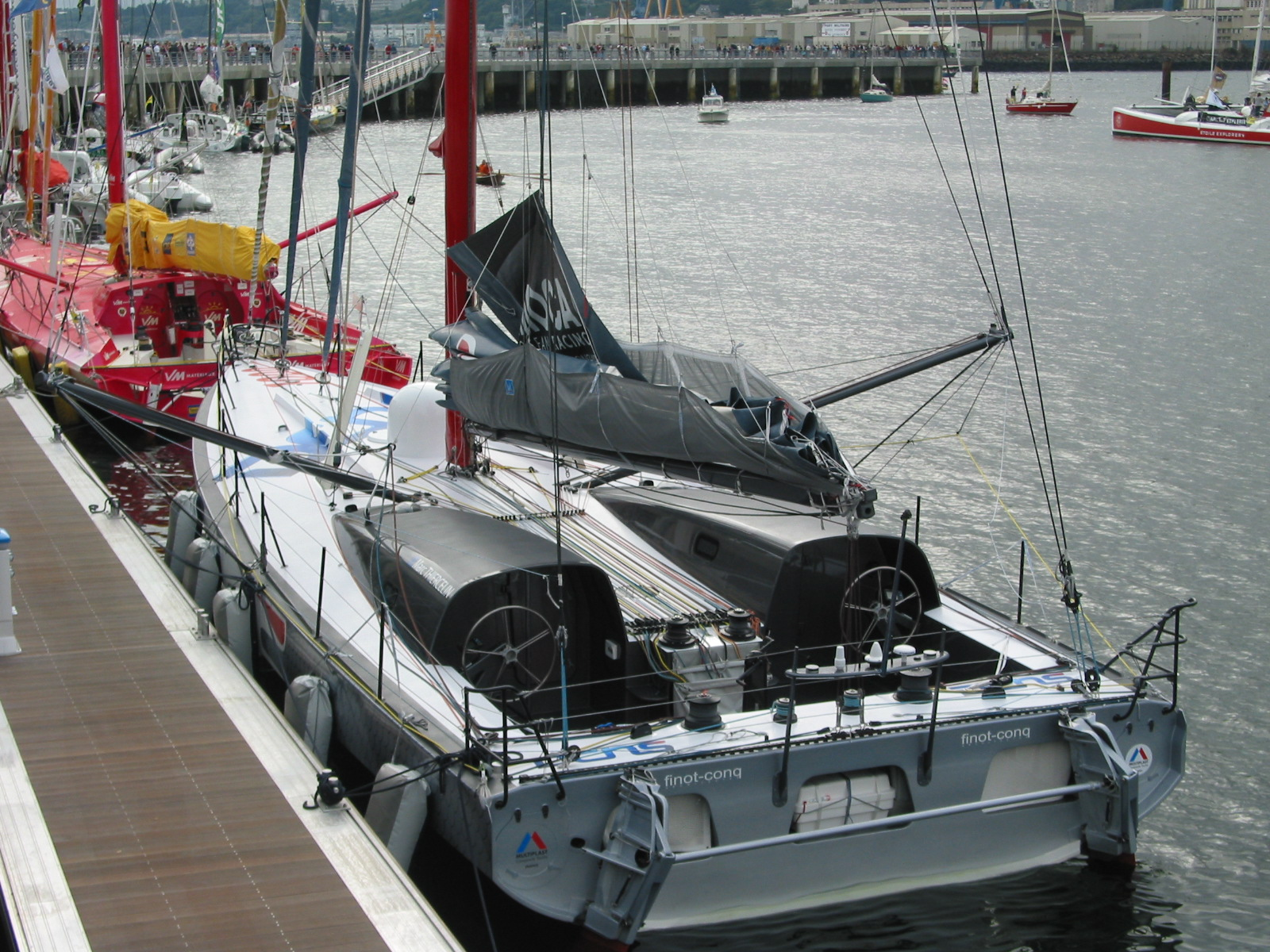

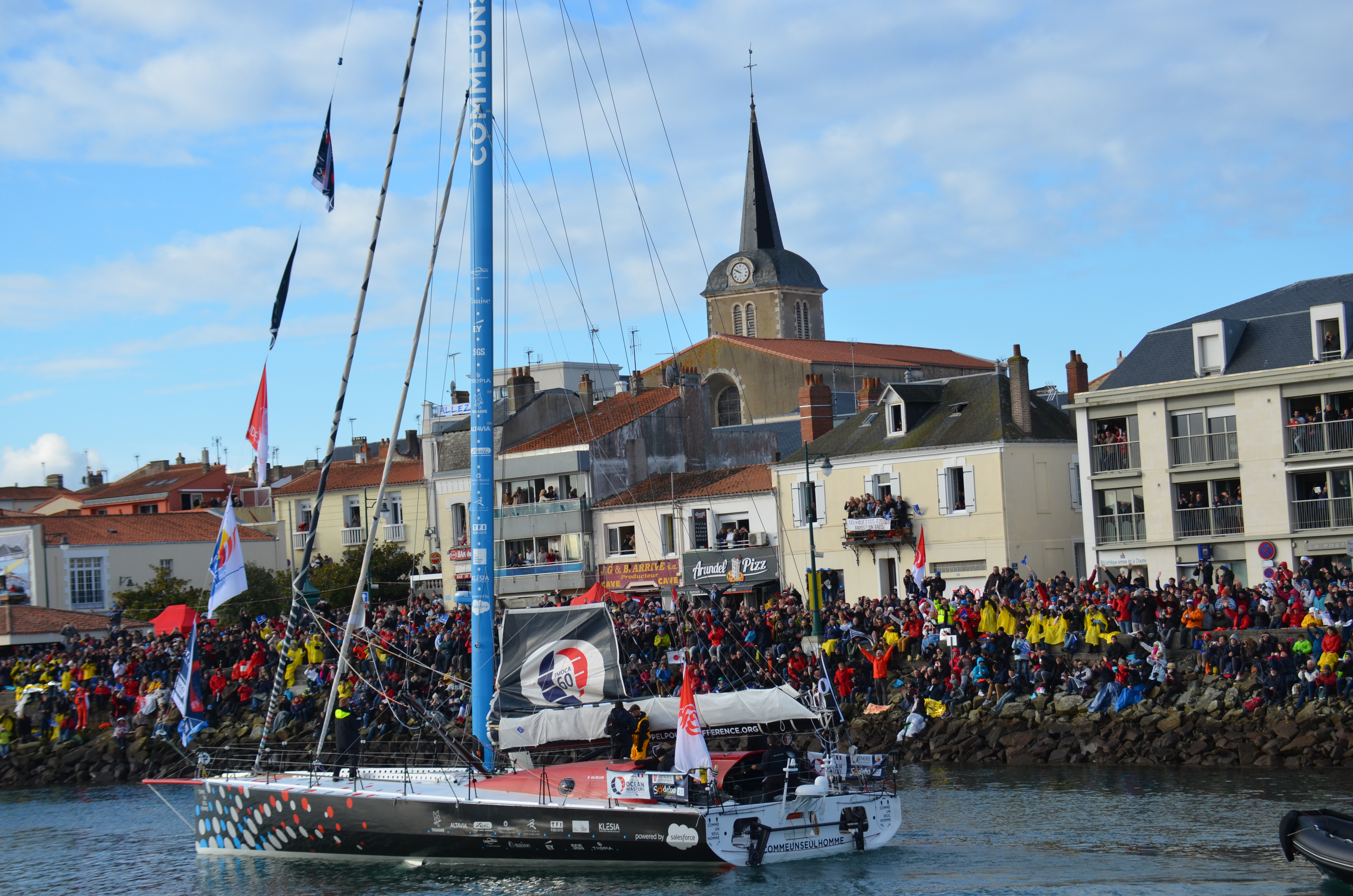

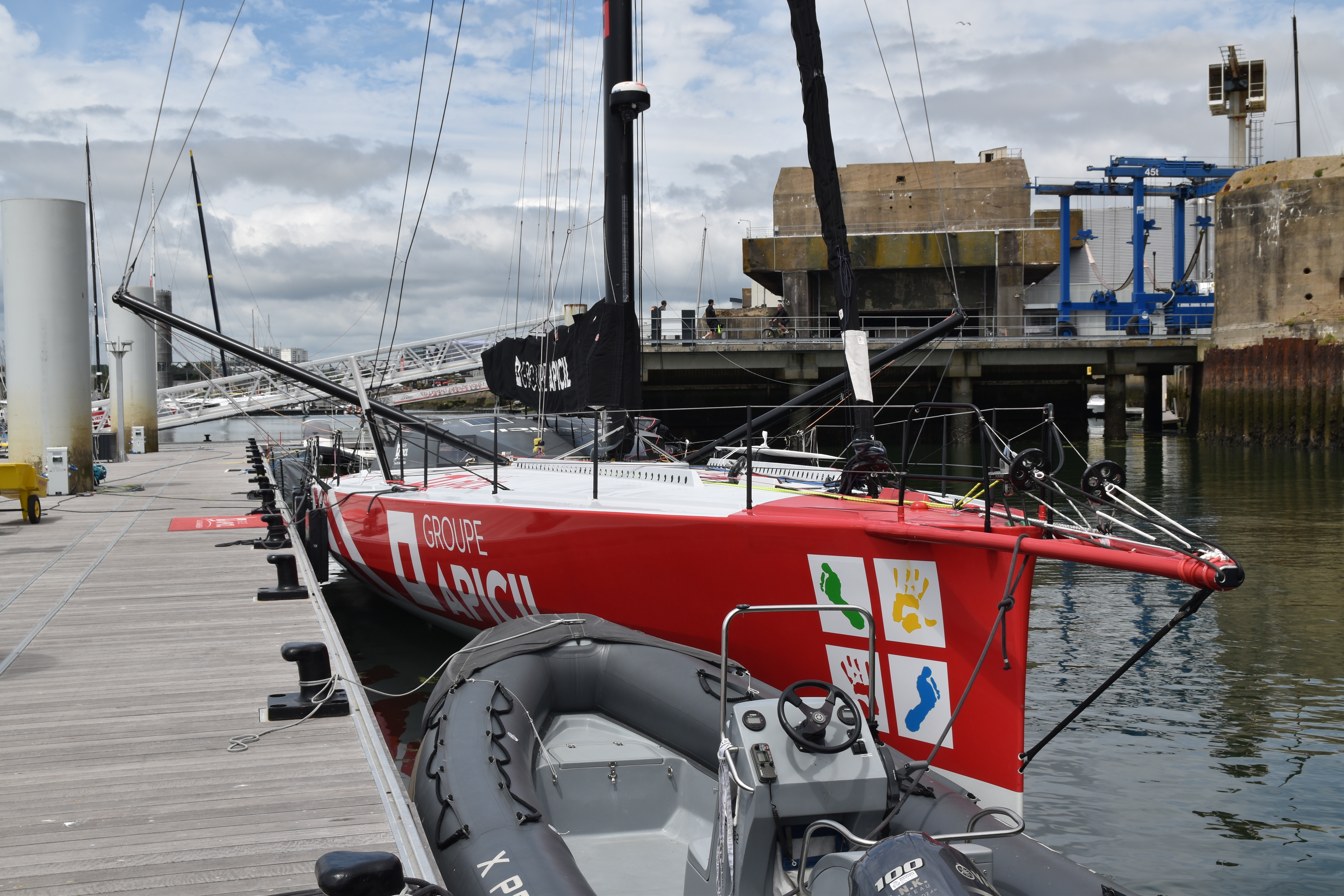

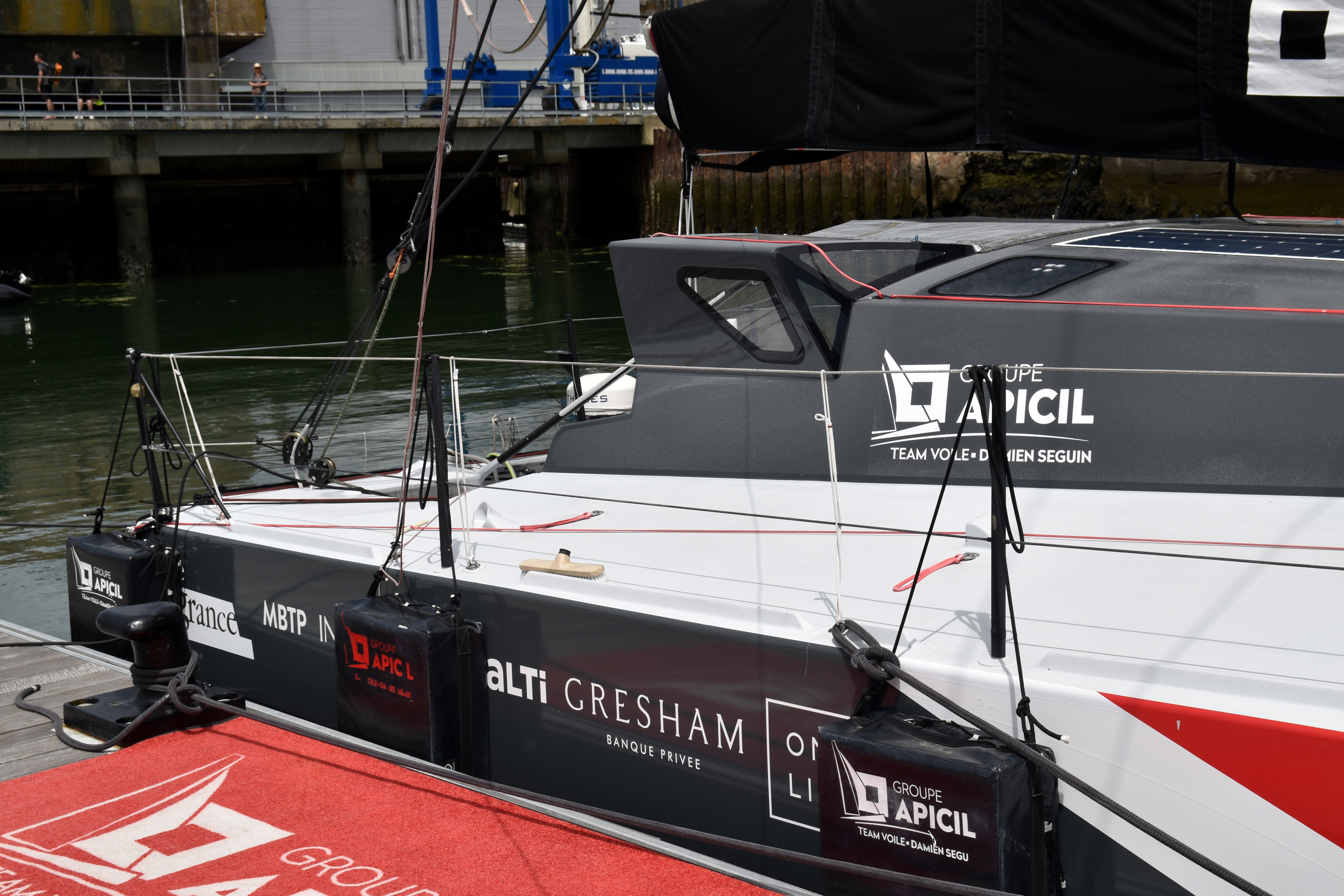

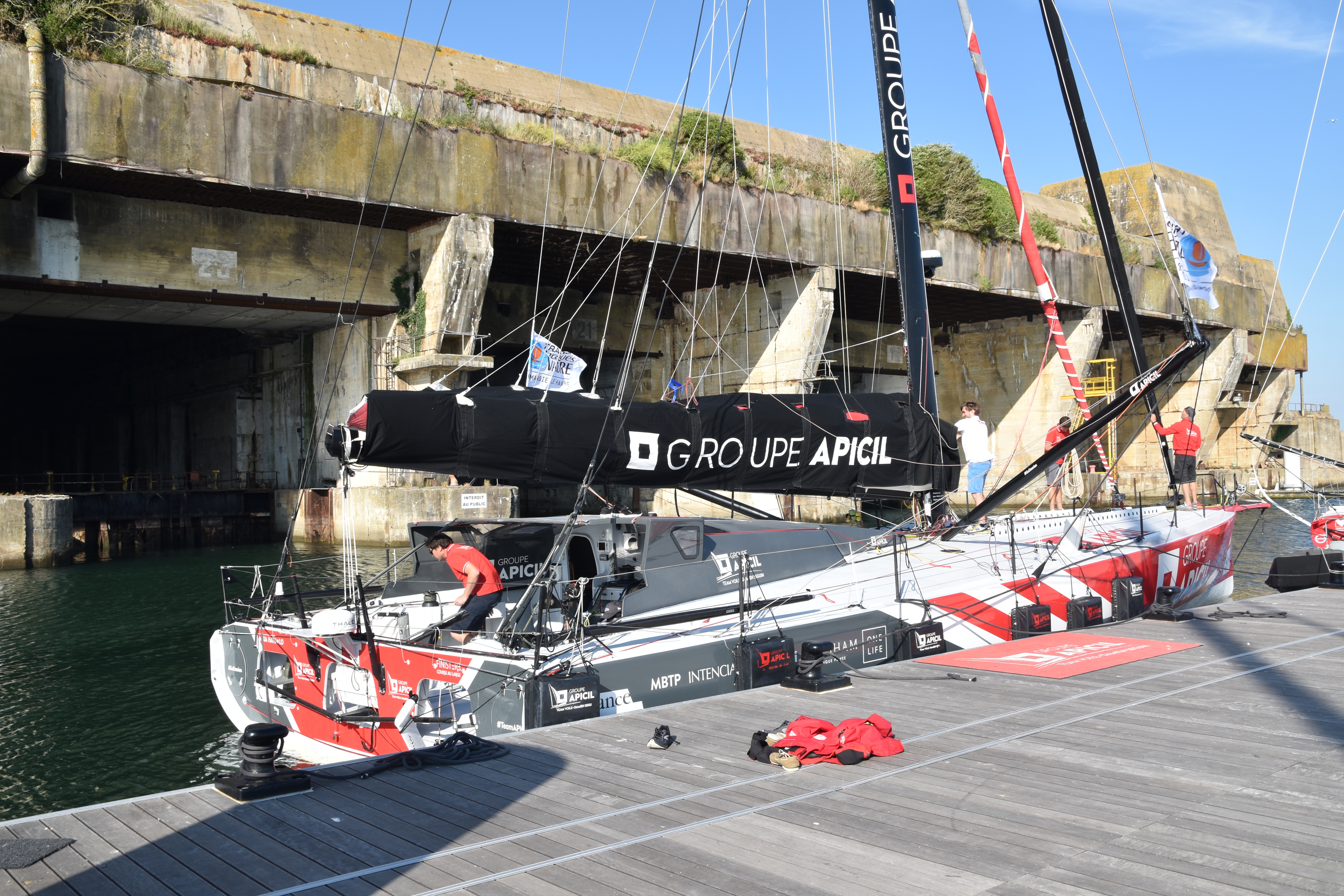

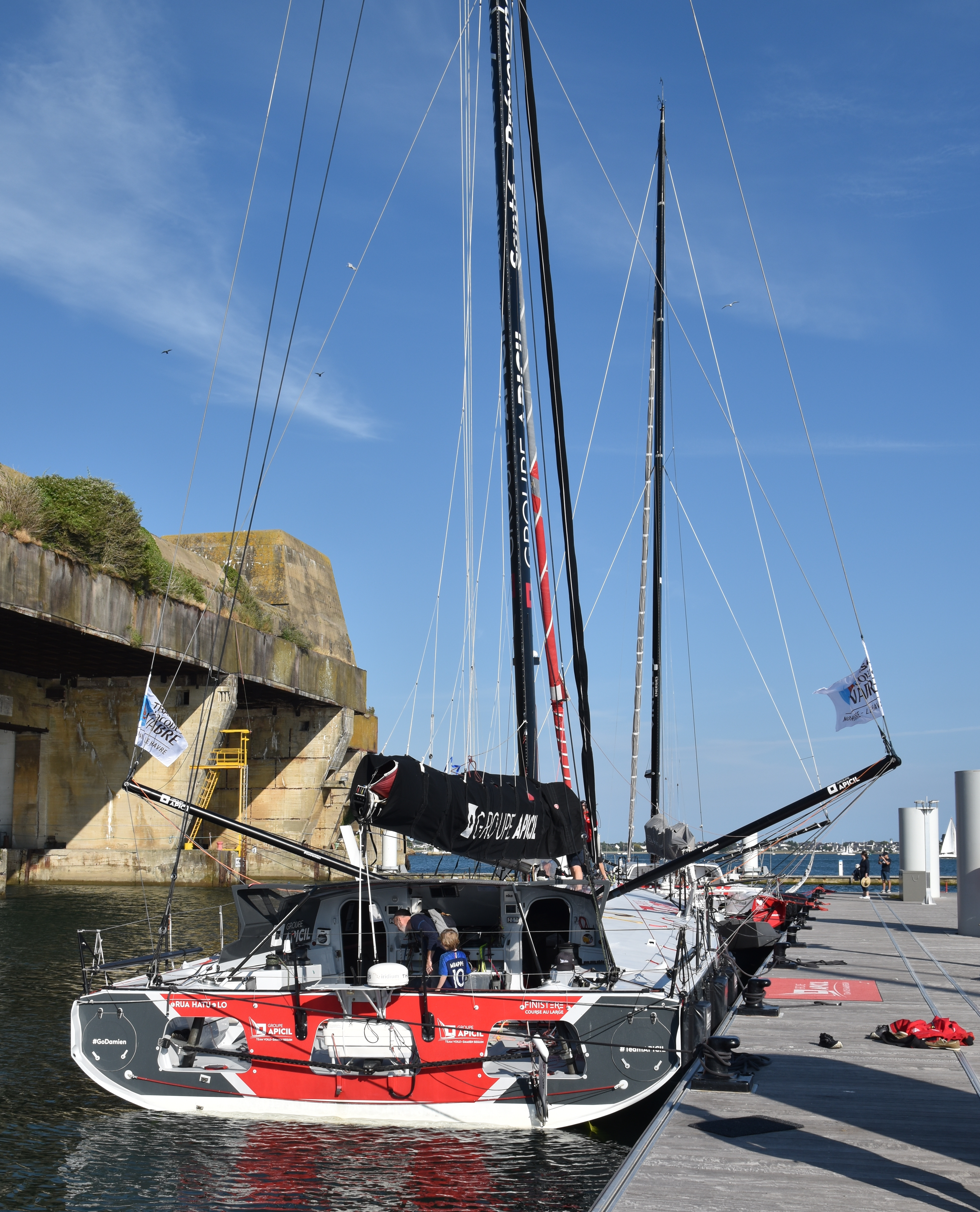

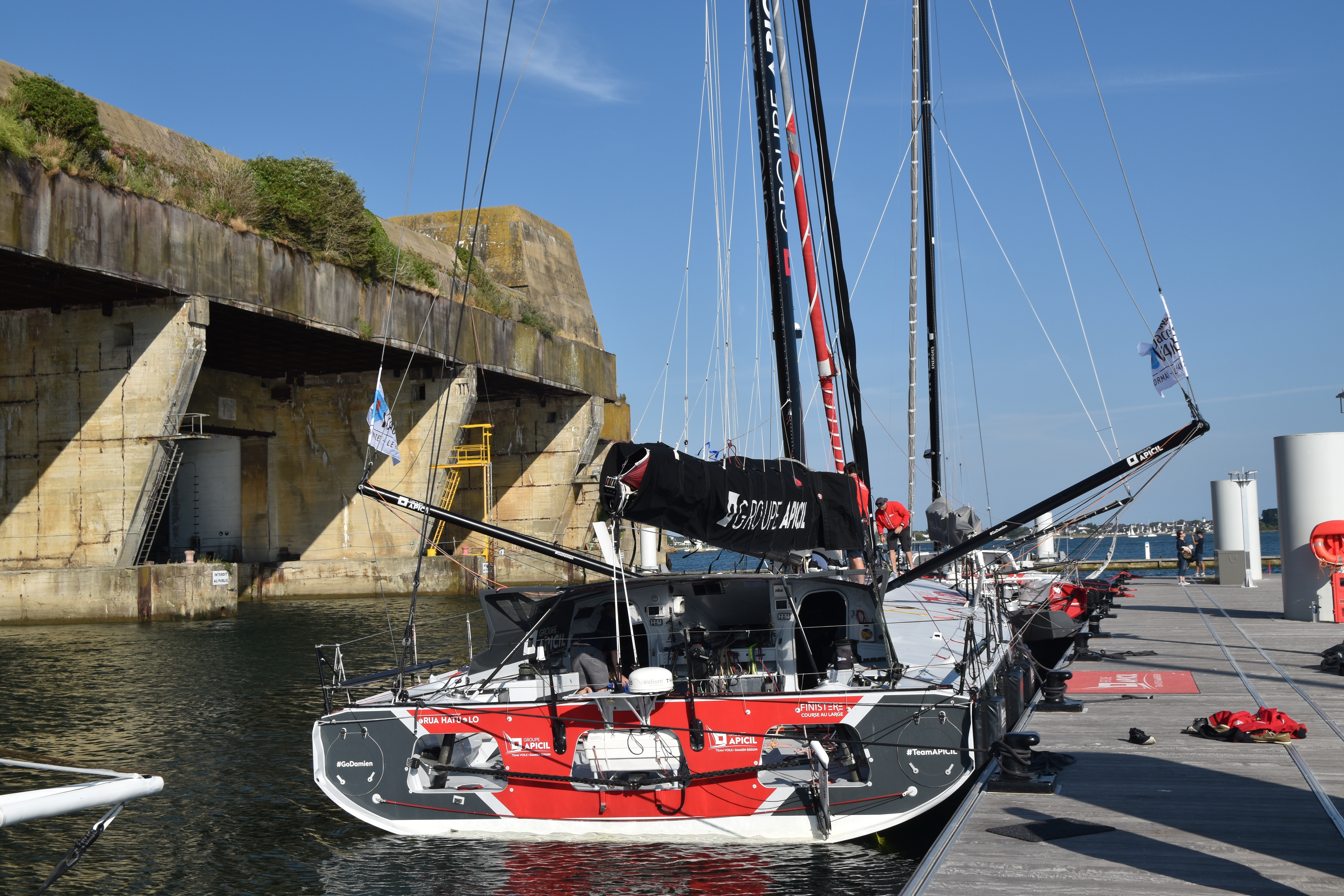
