= Diam 24 =

Development
- Designer: VPLP
- Year: 2014
- Builder: Vianney Ancelin

Boat
- Draft: 1.50 m (4.9 ft)

Hull
- LOA: 7.24 m (23.8 ft)
- LWL: 7.24 m (23.8 ft)
- Beam: 5.62 m (18.4 ft)

Diam 24 is a 7.24-metre (23.8 ft) trimaran sailboat class designed by VPLP and built by Vianney Ancelin that has been used in the Tour de France à la voile.
