= J/80 World Championship =

The J/80 World Championship is an annual international sailing regatta for J/80 keelboats, organized by the host club on behalf of the International J/80 Class Association and recognized by World Sailing, the sports IOC recognized governing body.

== Events ==
Edition			Host			Boats	Sailors					Ref.
No	Date	Year	Host club	Location	Nat.	Boats	No.			Nat.	Cont.	Ref.
1	1-10 Jul	2001	Ida Lewis Yacht Club	Newport, Rhode Island	United States	35				5+	2+	
2	16-22 Jun	2002	Société des Régates Rochelaises	La Rochelle, Charente-Maritime	France	46	190			12	4	
3	11-18 Oct	2003	Fort Worth Boat Club	Fort Worth, Texas	United States	48				4+	2+	
4	26-31 Jul	2004	Royal Swedish Yacht Club (KSSS)	Sandhamn	Sweden	55				6+	2+	
5	8-15 Jul	2005	Royal Cornwall Yacht Club	Falmouth, Cornwall	United Kingdom	52				7+	2+	
6	8-15 Jul	2006	Corpus Christi Yacht Club	Corpus Christi, Texas	United States	33				5+	2+	
7	1-7 Jul	2007	Societe Nautique of La Trinite	La Trinité-sur-Mer, Morbihan	France	123	133			9	2	
8	7-13 Jul	2008	Kieler Yacht-Club	Kiel	Germany	64	269			12	2	
9	4-11 Jul	2009	Real Club Maritimo de Santander	Santander, Cantabria	Spain	130				12+	3+	
10	4-9 Oct	2010	Sail Newport	Newport, Rhode Island	United States	61	245			11	4	
11	3-8 Jul	2011	Royal Danish Yacht Club	Hellerup	Denmark	67				13+	2+	
12	9-15 Jun	2012	Royal Dart Yacht Club	Dartmouth, Devon	United Kingdom	76				9+	3+	
13	6-13 Jul	2013	Events Company - Sirius Evenement	Marseille	France	117	523			14	3	
14	28Sep -5Oct	2014	Eastport Yacht Club	Annapolis, Maryland	United States	32	128	110	18	4	2	
15	1-10 Jul	2015	Kieler Yacht-Club	Kiel	Germany	50	211			8	1	
16	4Jun -2Jul	2016	Club Nautico Bevelle	Sotogrande	Spain	48				5+	1+	
17	8-14 Jul	2017	Royal Southern Yacht Club	Hamble-le-Rice	United Kingdom	48	205	166	39	12	4	
18	6-14 Jul	2018	Sports Nautiques Sablais	Les Sables d'Olonne	France	73	333	263	70	8	2	
19	14-20 Jul	2019	Real Club Marítimo del Abra and Real Sporting Club	Las Arenas, Getxo, Biscay	Spain	80				9+	2+	
N/A	28Sep -3Oct	2020	Sail Newport	Newport, Rhode Island	United States	CANCELLED DUE TO COVID						
20	3-9 Jul	2021	Royal Danish Yacht Club	Hellerup	Denmark	43	183	157	26	9	2	
21	4-8 Oct	2022	Sail Newport	Newport, Rhode Island	United States	48	209	175	34	10	3	
22	18-24 Sep	2023	Monte Real Club de Yates de Bayona	Baiona, Pontevedra	Spain	75	348	273	75	8	3	
23	6-13 Jul	2024	Société des Régates Rochelaises	La Rochelle, Charente-Maritime	France	70	325	265	60	8	2	
24	5-11 Jul	2025	Koninklijke Yacht Club Nieuwpoort	Nieuwpoort	Belgium	58	263	219	44	9	1	
25	18-27 Jul	2026	Canadian Olympic-training Regatta, Kingston	Portsmouth Olympic Harbour, Kingston, Ontario	Canada	34	137	117	20	5	2	

== Multiple World Champions ==
Ranking	Sailor	Gold	Silver	Bronze	Total	No. entries	Ref.
1	Rayco Tabares Álvarez (ESP)	5	1	0	6	12	
2	Alberto Padron Torrent (ESP)	5	0	0	5	6	
3	Laiyin Francisca Ley Torres (ESP)	3	0	0	3	5	
3	Hector Gonzalez Jorge (ESP)	3	0	0	3	5	
3	Jon Larrazabal Lallana (ESP)	3	0	0	3	3	
3	Javier Padron Torrent (ESP)	3	0	0	3	5	
7	Ignacio Camino Rodriguez (ESP)	2	0	2	4	10	
7	Alejandro Bethencourt Fuentes (ESP)	2	0	0	2	4	
8	Alejandro Bethencourt Fuentes (ESP)	2	0	0	2	4	
8	Afredo Gonzalez (ESP)	2	0	0	2	2	
8	Jose Maria Torcida Seghers (ESP)	2	0	0	2	7	
8	Daniel De La Pedraja Yllera (ESP)	2	0	0	2	2	
8	Pablo Santurde (ESP)	2	0	0	2	3	
8	Glenn Darden (USA)	2	0	0	2	7	

== Editions ==
Year	Gold	Silver	Bronze	Ref.
2001	USA 352 Kerry Klinger (USA); Mike Quaglio (USA); Chris Quaglio (USA); Jay Lurie (USA)	Synergy; Jay Lutz (USA); Unknown; Unknown; Unknown	Jam; Paul Heys (GBR) Marie Claude Heys (FRA); Katy Ware (GBR); Kevin Sproul (GBR)	
2002	FRA 376 - Tendrisse Pascal Abignoli (FRA); Eric Marti (FRA); Laurent Abignoli (FRA); Xavier Rohart (FRA)	USA 352 Kerry Klingler (USA); Jay Lurie (USA); Jesse Stewart (USA); Chris Browne (USA)	USA 498 - Hammertimes / Synergy Steven Hammerman (USA); Jay Lutz (USA); Joe Taylor (USA); Gustavo Escobar (USA)	
2003	USA 531 - Perigee Jay Lutz (USA); Unknown; Unknown; Unknown	USA 585 John Kolius (USA); Unknown; Unknown; Unknown	SWE 243 - Swedeshipping Christer Faith-Ell (SWE); Unknown; Unknown; Unknown	
2004	GER 508 - Needles and Pins Peter Hecht (SWE); Unknown; Unknown; Unknown	USA 352 Kerry Klingler (USA); Robert Miller (USA); Unknown; Unknown	USA 585 - Grrrr John W. Kolius (USA); Unknown; Unknown; Unknown	
2005	GBR 663 - Volvo Ruairidh Scott (GBR); Ben Field (GBR); Anna Scott-ish (GBR); Shane Hughes (IRL); Giles Waterhouse (GBR)	GBR 724 - Silva Dream Machine Kevin Sproul (GBR)	SWE 243 - team sbab Mikael Lindquist (SWE)	
2006	L'Glide 27 / 407 Glenn Darden (USA); Unknown; Unknown; Unknown	Quantum Racing 17 / 720 John Kolius (USA); Unknown; Unknown; Unknown	Flyer 14 / 266 Scott Young (USA); Unknown; Unknown; Unknown	
2007	ESP 859 - ECC Viviendas Jose Maria Torcida Seghers (ESP); Unknown; Unknown; Unknown	ESP 899 - Nextel Engineering Fernando Pereda (ESP); Unknown; Unknown; Unknown	GER 508 - Needles and Pins Harald Schilling (ESP); Unknown; Unknown; Unknown	
2008	ESP 899 - Nextel Engineering Ignacio Camino Rodriguez (ESP); Armando Gutierrez (ESP); Jose Luis Gomez (ESP); Padron Alberto (ESP)	USA 1151 - Polar Express Jeff Johnstone (USA); Henning Mittelmann (GER); Florian Föh (GER); Stella Mau (GER); Bo Teichmann (GER)	ESP 977 - Peraleja Golf Carlos Martinez (ESP); Juan Manuel Barrionuevo (ESP); Eugenio Pedreno (ESP); Chencho Ortega (ESP)	
2009	ESP 783 - Hotel Princesa Yaiza-Islas Can Rayco Tabares Álvarez (ESP); Unknown; Unknown; Unknown	ESP 774 - JJ Palmensis-Islas Canarias; Gustavo Martínez (ESP)	ESP 977 - Peraleja Golf; Carlos MARTÍNEZ (ESP)	
2010	ESP 859 - ECC Viviendas Jose Maria Torcida (ESP); Javier de la Plaza (ESP); Juan Gonzalez Torcida (ESP); Carlos Martinez (ESP)	USA 655 - Quantum Racing Scott Young (USA); Terry Flynn (USA); John Morran (USA); Philip Williamson (USA)	ESP 977 - Peraleja Golf Carlos Martinez (ESP); Juan Manuel Barrionuevo (ESP); Chencho Ortega (ESP); Eugenio Pedreñ (ESP)	
2011	ESP 899 - Nextel Engineering Ignacio Camino Rodriguez (ESP); Unknown; Unknown; Unknown	ESP 1340; José María van der Ploeg (ESP)	ESP 977; Carlos Martinez (ESP)	
2012	ESP 9 - Nilfisk; José María van der Ploeg (ESP) Lluis Mas (ESP) [[Juan Ignacio Merayo]] (ESP); Hugo Ramon (ESP)	ESP 8 - Hote Princesa Yaiza; Rayco Tabares (ESP)	ESP 6 - Mapfre; Carlos Martinez (ESP)	
2013	ESP 1154 - New territoriess Hugo Rocha (POR); Alex Semenov (RUS); Franscisco Palacio (ESP); Pavel Savenko (RUS); David Madraz (ESP)	FRA 691 - Gan'ja Luc Nadal (FRA); Thierry Berger (FRA); Gilles Corcaud (FRA); Pierre Mousselon (FRA)	FRA 1302 - Interface Concept Eric Brezellec (FRA); Josselin Le Moine (FRA); Yann Chateau (FRA); Sebastien Col (FRA)	
2015	ESP 783 Hotel Princesa Yaiza Rayco Tabares (ESP); Oliver Herrera Perez (ESP); Domingo Falero Lasso (ESP); Hector GONZALES Jorge (ESP); Laiyin Ley Torres (ESP)	ESP 1519 Bribon-Movistar Marc de Antonio (ESP)	FRA 453 Co-Pilotes Maxime Mesnil (FRA)	
2016	ESP 783 - Princesa Yaiza; Rayco Tabares (ESP); Unknown; Unknown; Unknown			
2017	ESP 783 - Princesa Yaiza Rayco Tabares Alvares (ESP); Alejandro Bethencourt Fuentes (ESP); Afredo Gonzalez (ESP); Hector Gonzalez Jorge (ESP); Laiyin Francisca Ley Torres (ESP)	FRA 1420 - Courrier Junior	FRA 1302 - Armen Habitat	
2018	Hotel Princesa Yaiza Rayco Tabares Alvares (ESP); Alfredo Gonzalez (ESP); Laiyin Francisc Ley Torres (ESP); Alejandro Bethencourt Fuentes (ESP); Hector Gonzalez Jorge (ESP)	Garatu Iker Almondoz (ESP); Inigo Sanchez (ESP); Borian Ponte (ESP); Inigo Jauregui (ESP)	Armen Habitat Simon Moriceau (FRA); Jean Queveau (FRA); Vincent Guillarm (FRA); Pierre Loic Berthet (FRA); Paul Medinger (FRA)	
2019	ESP 1192 - M&G Tressis Pablo Santurde (ESP); Unknown; Unknown; Unknown	ESP 1519 - Bribon Movistar Marc De Antonio (ESP); Unknown; Unknown; Unknown	FRA 646 - Courrier Ecole Navale Pierre Laouenan (FRA); Unknown; Unknown; Unknown	
2020	Cancelled COVID-19			
2021 43 Boats	ESP 1192 - NeWind Foods Pablo Santurde Del Arco (ESP); Daniel De La Pedraja Yllera (ESP); Jon Larrazabal Lallana (ESP); Alberto Padron Torrent (ESP); Joaquin Cavero Fernandez-Cotero (ESP)			
2022	USA 1152 - Le Tigre Glenn Darden (USA); Victor Diaz de Leon (USA); Marcus Eagan (USA); Rod Favela (USA); Willem Van Waay (USA)			
2023	ESP 1192 - Eurofrits & Aviko Javier Padron Torrent (ESP); Jon Larrazabal Lallana (ESP); Alberto Padron Torrent (ESP); Lucia Gonzalez Villa (ESP); Eduardo Reguera Fernández (ESP)			
2024	ESP 1192 - Eurofrits & Aviko Javier Padron Torrent (ESP); Jon Larrazabal Lallana (ESP); Alberto Padron Torrent (ESP); Daniel De La Pedraja (ESP); Alba Ponce (ESP)	Pierre Laouenan (FRA) Christian Ponthieu (FRA); Jean Queveau (FRA); Damien Iehl (FRA); Tiphaine Ragueneau (FRA)	Iker Almandoz (ESP) Iigo Jauregui (ESP); Iigo Sanchez (ESP); Borja Ponte (ESP)	
2025	ESP 1192 - Eurofrits Aviko & Newind Foods Javier Padron Torrent (ESP); Jon Larrazabal Lallana (ESP); Daniel Enrique De La Pedraja Yllera (ESP); Alberto Padron Torrent (ESP); Alba Ponce La Camera (ESP)	FRA 1302 Simon Moriceau (FRA); Simon Bertheau (FRA); Vincent Guillarm (FRA); Alice Bigot (FRA); Julien Augereau (FRA)	ESP 1332 José Manuel Ruiz Sánchez (ESP); Nuria Sánchez Nomdedeu (ESP); Juan Manuel Barrionuevo Vallejo (ESP); Leonardo Armas (ESP); Daniel Fructuoso Rosique (ESP)	
2026	USA-1152 - Le Tigre James Buley (USA); Jackson Benvenutti (USA); Bill Hardesty (USA); Skip Dieball (USA)	GER-1150 - Paint it black Michael Grau (GER); Florian Thoelen (GER); Willem Van Waay (USA); Judson Smith (USA)	USA-1313 - Turbo Sloth Daniel Wittig (USA); Kristen Berry (USA); Mike Coe (USA); Ian Moriarty (USA)	
