= David Williams (sailor) =

British sailor

Personal information
- Nationality: British
- Born: 7 August 1966 (age 60) Canterbury, England

Sport
- Sport: Sailing

David Williams (born 7 August 1966) is a British sailor. He competed at the 1992 Summer Olympics and the 1996 Summer Olympics.
