= Heiko Kröger =

German Paralympic sailor

Heiko Kroeger
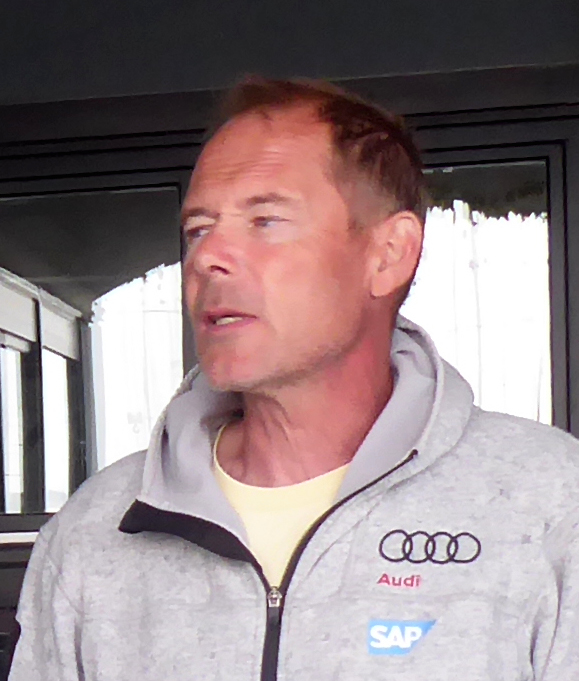

Personal information
- Nationality: German
- Born: 27 March 1966 (age 60) Waldbröl

Sailing career
- Sport: Sailing
Medal record
Sailing
Paralympic Games
Gold medal – first place	2000 Sydney	2.4m
Silver medal – second place	2012 London	Norlin Mk3
World Championships in Sailing
Gold medal – first place	2016 Disabled	2.4m
Gold medal – first place	2014 Disabled	2.4m
Gold medal – first place	2006 Disabled	2.4m
Gold medal – first place	2003 Disabled	2.4m
Gold medal – first place	2002 Disabled	2.4m
Gold medal – first place	2001 Disabled	2.4m
Gold medal – first place	2001 Open	2.4m
Gold medal – first place	1999 Disabled	2.4m
Silver medal – second place	2015 Disabled	2.4m
Silver medal – second place	2013 Disabled	2.4m
Silver medal – second place	2010 Disabled	2.4m
Silver medal – second place	2009 Disabled	2.4m
Silver medal – second place	2007 Disabled	2.4m
Silver medal – second place	2005 Disabled	2.4m

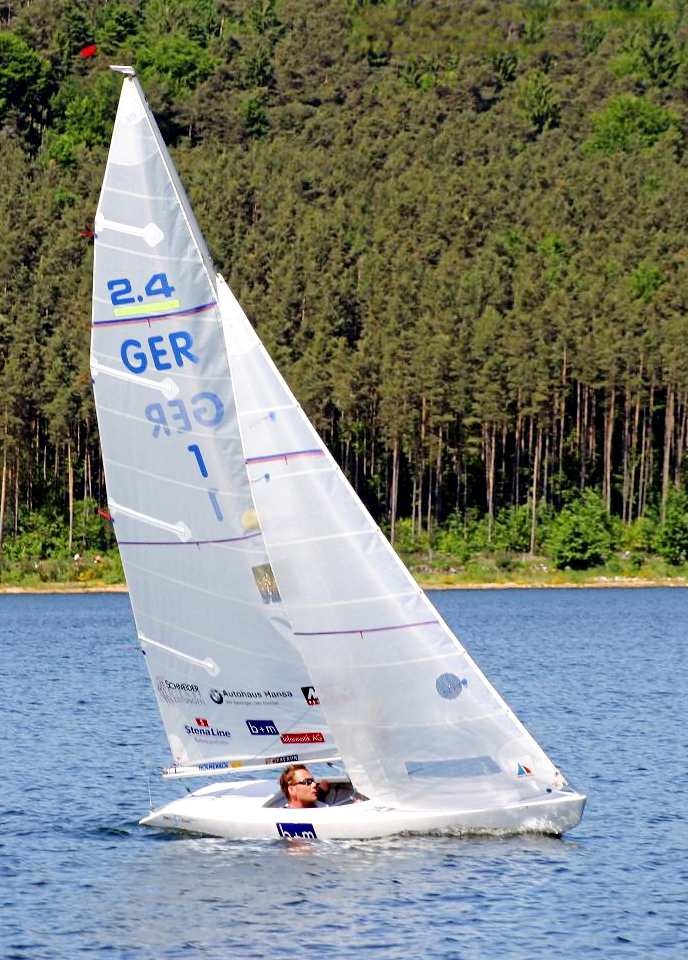
Kröger in the 2.4 Metre.

Heiko Kröger (born 27 March 1966) is a German Paralympic sailor who won the gold medal in the 2.4 Metre class in the 2000 Paralympics and a silver medal in the 2012 edition. Kröger also has 8 World championships titles.
