= 2.4 Metre =

Class of one-person racing yacht

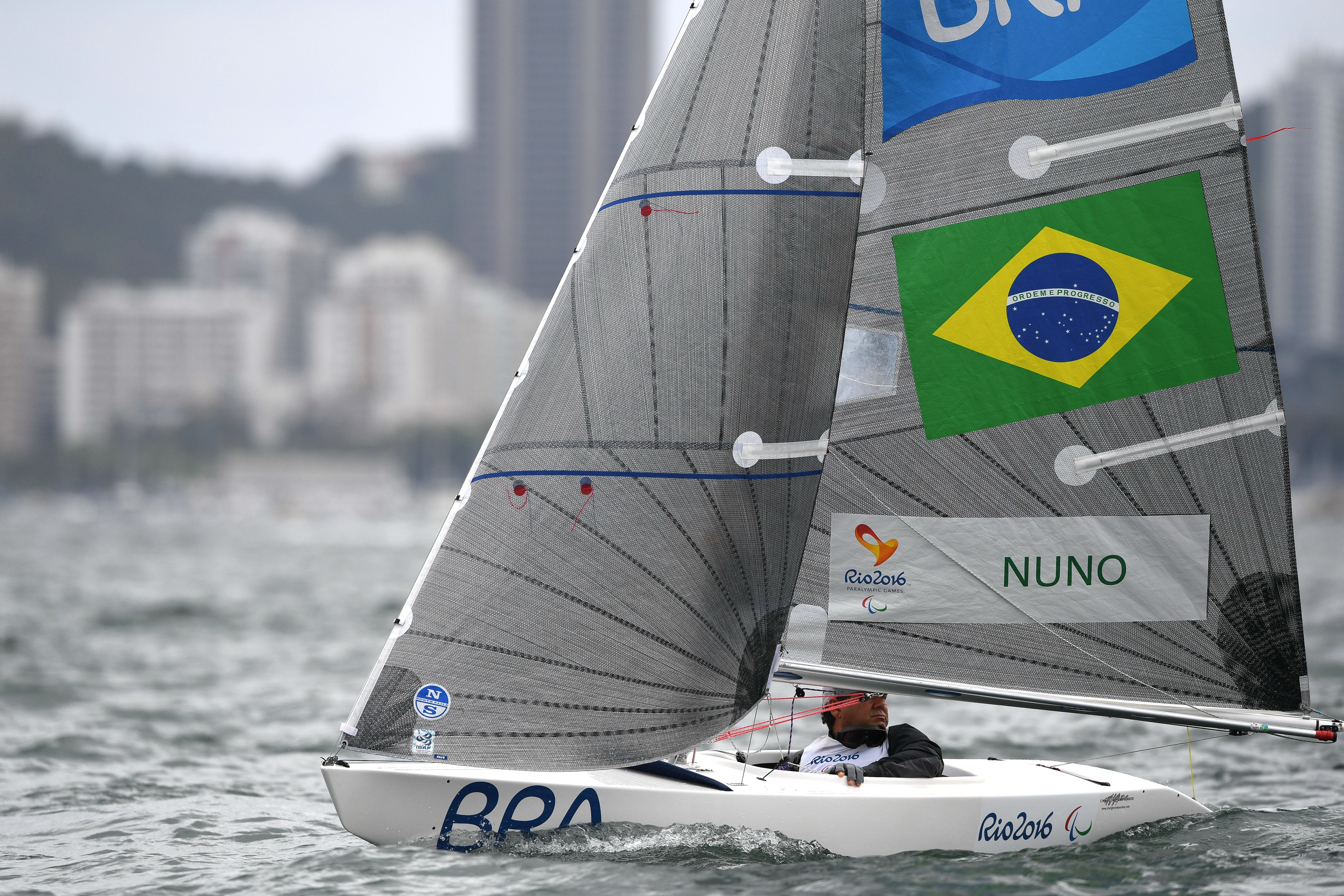
- International 2.4mR

Development
- Design: Development class

Boat
- Crew: 1
- Draft: 1 m (39 in) (Mark III)

Hull
- Hull weight: 260 kg (570 lb)
- LOA: 4.16 m (13 ft 8 in) (Mark III)
- Beam: 0.805 m (2 ft 7 3/4 in)

Rig
- Rig type: Fractional Sloop
- Mast height: 4.65 m (15 ft 3 in)

Sails
- Upwind sail area: 7.5 m^{2} (81 sq ft) (Mark III)

Racing
- RYA PN: 1250

The International 2.4mR is a one-person keelboat. The class is a development class governed by the 2.4mR rule. The rule controlled by World Sailing (formerly known as ISAF) is one of the few classes designated as an International Class. The International 2.4mR Class rule is closely related to the International 12mR class rule that was used at the America's Cup.

While there is a small but active group of amateur or professional designers and builders around the world, around 90% of the 2.4mR boats are the commercially produced Norlin Mark III designed by Swedish yacht designer Peter Norlin. Over the years, new 2.4mR designs such as the Stradivari III, the Proton and the Super 3 have come into production.

The 2.4mR boats are primarily used for racing and the class holds highly competitive national events in many countries. World and European championships can attract as many as 100 boats at a time.

The 2.4mR is ideal for adaptive sailing since the sailor barely moves in the boat, and all settings can be adjusted from a facing forward seated position. Both hand-steering and foot-steering are possible. The boat is sailed without a spinnaker, but it is equipped with a whisker-pole that is extending outward to hold the shape of the jib when sailing downwind. The boat's capability as a truly inclusive sailing boat has been demonstrated over many years at multiple Open World Championships.

== History ==
After the 1980 America's Cup, people in the Newport, RI area started sailing boats called Mini-12s. They were named after the 12-Metre yachts that were used at the America's Cup. As the fleet started to grow, the word spread to Sweden, home of the yacht designer Peter Norlin. Peter Norlin refined the original designs, and along with other naval architects, they collectively initiated the International 2.4mR Class that we know today. Although the 2.4mR is a development class, Peter Norlin has become the dominant designer, and the class is therefore often mistaken as a one-design class.

== One-design ==
In recent years attempts have been made to develop a one-design class based on the 2.4 Norlin Mark III. This was primarily because the competition within the Paralympics was meant to be more about the sailors' competitiveness and less about the equipment. This led to the introduction of Appendix K to the Class rules and a group of individuals started to work on a set of stand-alone one-design rules. This is still at the early stages but this effort is likely to lead to the emergence of a new one-design 2.4mR class alongside the existing development 2.4mR class.

== Rating formula ==
As an open class rather than a one-design, all boat designs must meet the following formula.

$$\frac{L + 2d + \sqrt{S} - F}{2.37} \leq 2.4 \mbox{ metres}$$

(all measurements in mm)

- L = the "corrected" length of the hull (see rule D.6.3)
- d = the midship girth difference (see rule D.6.4)
- F = the average freeboard height (see rule D.6.5)
- S = the total rated area of the mainsail and jib combined.

== Events ==
=== Para World Sailing Championships ===
The 2.4 metre has been used a number of times as equipment for the One-Person Technical Disabled discipline which holds an annual World Championships.

Year	Gold	Silver	Bronze	Ref.
1999 Cádiz	Heiko Kröger (GER)	Jens Als Andersen (DEN)	Phillippe Balle (FRA)	
2000	not held because of the 2000 Summer Paralympics			
2001 St. Petersburg	Heiko Kröger (GER)	Thomas Brown (USA)	Bjørnar Erikstad (NOR)	
2002 Medemblik	Heiko Kröger (GER)	Damien Seguin (FRA)	Thomas Brown (USA)	
2003 Athens	Heiko Kröger (GER)	Damien Seguin (FRA)	Thierry Schmitter (NED)	
2004	not held because of the 2004 Summer Paralympics			
2005 Sønderborg	Damien Seguin (FRA)	Heiko Kröger (GER)	Thierry Schmitter (NED)	
2006 Perth	Heiko Kröger (GER)	Helena Lucas (GBR)	Bjørnar Erikstad (NOR)	
2007 Rochester	Damien Seguin (FRA)	Heiko Kröger (GER)	Thierry Schmitter (NED)	
2008	not held because of the 2008 Summer Paralympics			
2009 Athens	Thierry Schmitter (NED)	Heiko Kröger (GER)	Helena Lucas (GBR)	
2010 Medemblik	Thierry Schmitter (NED)	Heiko Kröger (GER)	Megan Pascoe (GBR)	
2011 Weymouth	Thierry Schmitter (NED)	André Rademaker (NED)	Helena Lucas (GBR)	
2012 Charlotte Harbor	Damien Seguin (FRA)	Thierry Schmitter (NED)	Paul Tingley (CAN)	
2013 Kinsale	Guus Bijlard (NED)	Heiko Kröger (GER)	Damien Seguin (FRA)	
2014 Nova Scotia	Heiko Kröger (GER)	Helena Lucas (GBR)	Damien Seguin (FRA)	
2015 Melbourne	Damien Seguin (FRA)	Heiko Kröger (GER)	Matthew Bugg (AUS)	
2016 Medemblik	Heiko Kröger (GER)	Damien Seguin (FRA)	Matthew Bugg (AUS)	
2017 Kiel	Heiko Kröger (GER)	Matthew Bugg (AUS)	Damien Seguin (FRA)	
2018 Sheboygan	Matthew Bugg (AUS)	Damien Seguin (FRA)	Dee Smith (USA)	
2019 Cádiz	Damien Seguin (FRA)	Antonio Squizzato (ITA)	Bjørnar Erikstad (NOR)	
2021 Warnemünde	Heiko Kröger (GER)	Antonio Squizzato (ITA)	Fia Fjelddahl (SWE)	

=== Paralympics ===
From 2000 to 2016, the 2.4 Metre was the official single-crew class boat for sailing at the Summer Paralympics although it was used in a more one-design form utilising the Norlin Mk3 design.

Year	Gold	Silver	Bronze
2000 Sydney	Heiko Kroeger (GER)	Jens Als Andersen (DEN)	Thomas Brown (USA)
2004 Athens	Damien Seguin (FRA)	Thomas Brown (USA)	Thierry Schmitter (NED)
2008 Beijing	Paul Tingley (CAN)	Damien Seguin (FRA)	John Ruf (USA)
2012 London	Helena Lucas (GBR)	Heiko Kroeger (GER)	Thierry Schmitter (NED)
2016 Rio de Janeiro	Damien Seguin (FRA)	Matthew Bugg (AUS)	Helena Lucas (GBR)
