= Royal Netherlands Watersport Association =

National governing body for boating sports

- IOC nation: Netherlands (NED)
- Sport: Sailing
- Other sports: Surfing; Canoeing
- Official website: www.watersportverbond.nl

HISTORY
- Preceding organisations: Royal Netherlands Yachting Union
- Year of formation: 1890

AFFILIATIONS
- International federation: World Sailing (WS)
- WS members page: www.sailing.org/about/members/mnas/netherlands.php
- WS member since: 1907 Founding Member
- National Olympic Committee: Dutch Olympic Committee
- National Paralympic Committee: Dutch Paralympic Committee

ELECTED
- President: Ernst Jan Broer

SECRETARIAT
- Country: Netherlands
- Secretary General: Arno van Gerven

FINANCE
- Company status: Association

The Royal Netherlands Watersport Association (Dutch: Koninklijk Nederlands Watersport Verbond) is the national governing body for the sports of sailing, surfing, and canoeing in the Netherlands, recognised by World Sailing, the global governing body for the sport of sailing.

== History ==
The organization was founded in 1890 as Koninlijk Verbond Nederlandsche Watersport Verenigingen.

=== Olympic sailing ===
The Dutch were in most of the Olympic sailing competitions represented by the Dutch Olympic Sailing Team, including the years: 1928, 1932, 1936, 1948, 1952, 1956 (Boycott), 1960, 1964, 1968, 1972, 1976, 1980 (Under IOC flag), 1984, 1988, 1992, 1996, 2000, 2004, 2008, and 2012.

The selection of the members of the team was done by the KNWV or its predecessor. Except for 1908 and 1912, there were always Dutch sailors willing to compete at this pinnacle of competitive sailing. Even in 1956 in Melbourne the Dutch team was willing and able to perform. However, at the last possible moment the Dutch NOC and the Dutch government (together with Switzerland and Spain), ordered a boycott of these games. This boycott was a result of the presence in Hungary of the Soviet Union after the Hungarian Revolution. The KNWV was not in favor of this boycott.

== Classes ==
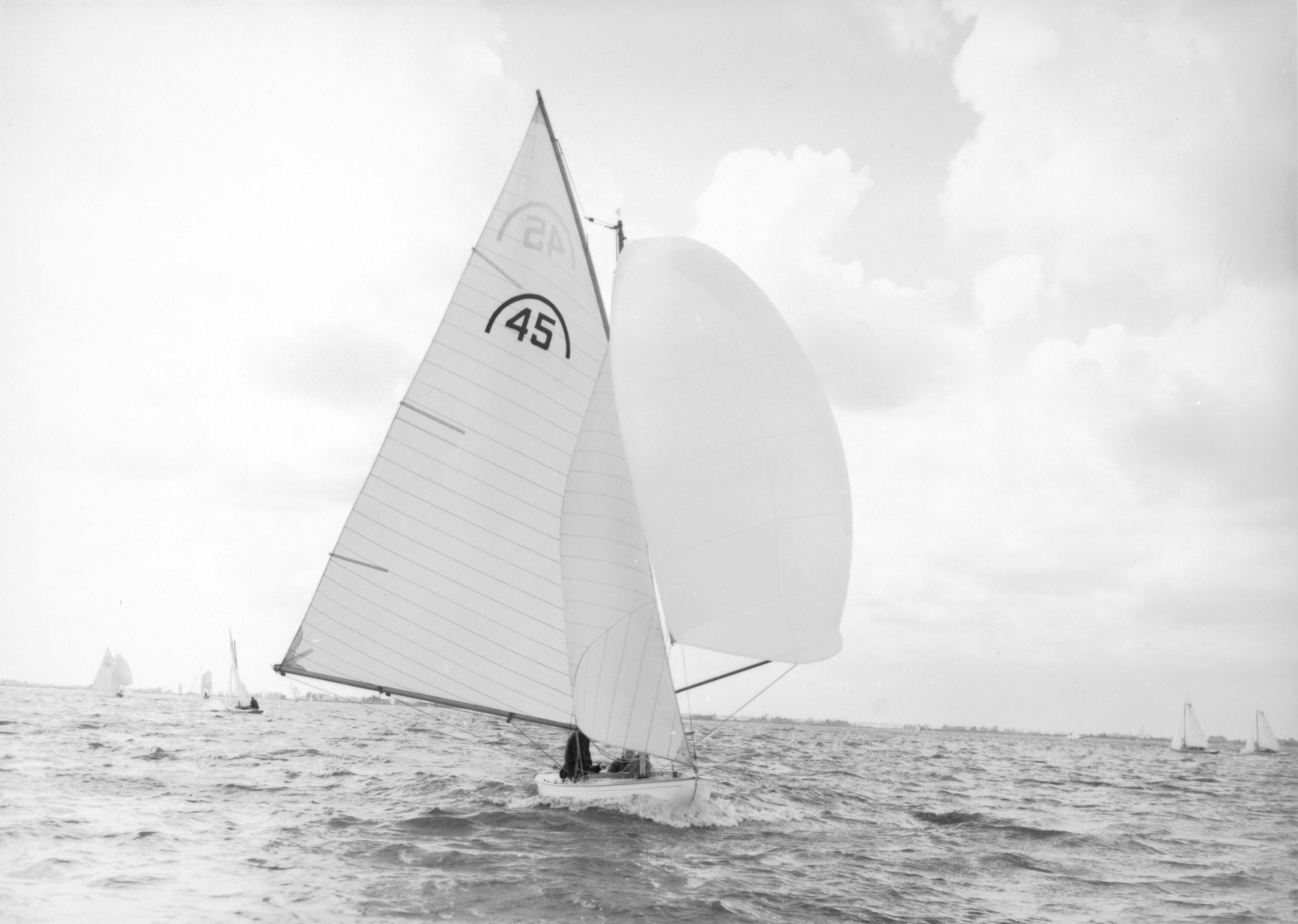
Regenboog in 1956

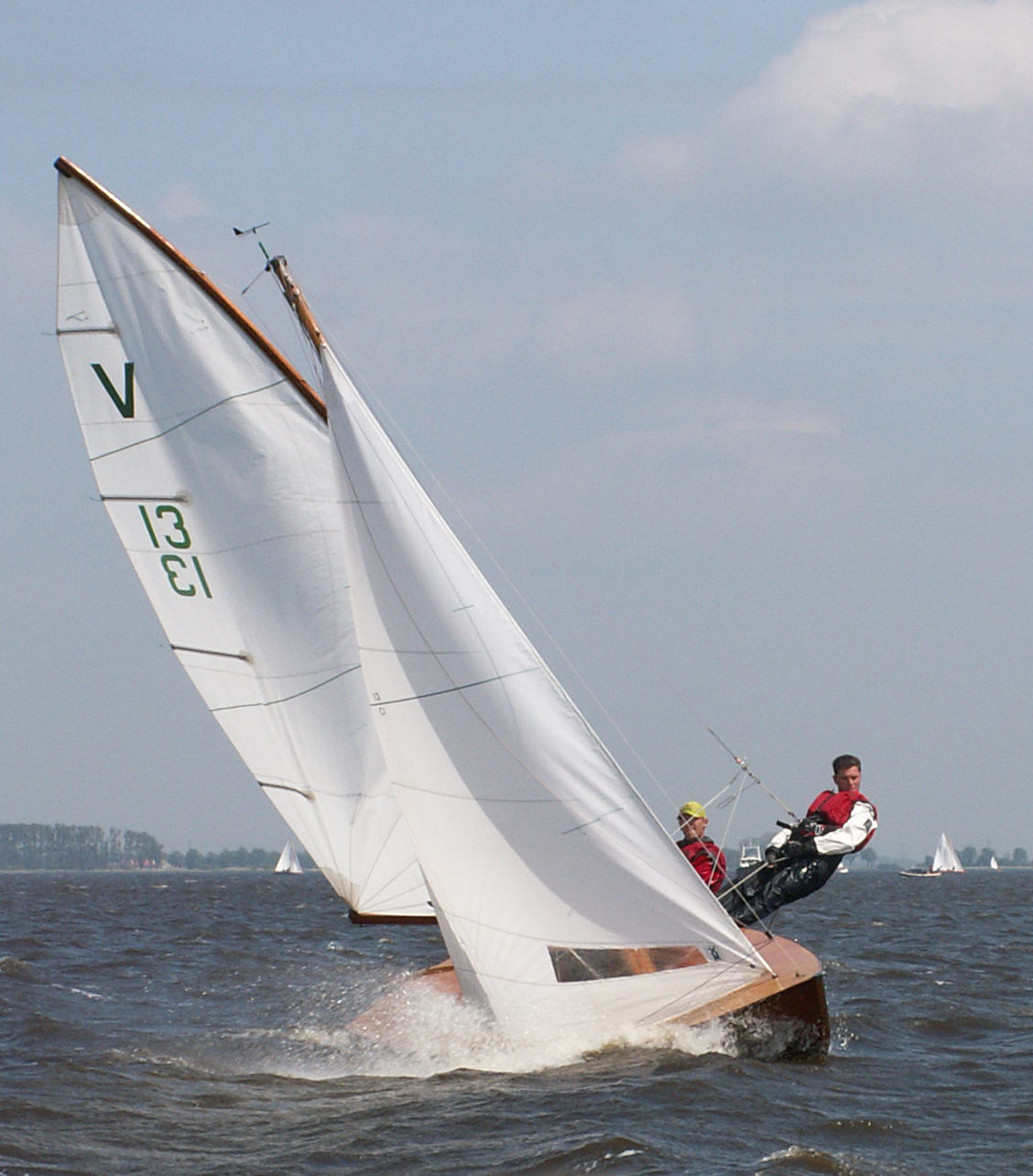
Vrijheid in 2006

The following class organisations are affiliated to the Royal Netherlands Watersport Association:

- 12-foot dinghy
- 12 m^{2} Sharpie
- 16 m^{2}
- 2.4 Metre
- 22 m^{2}
- 29er
- 30 m^{2}
- 470
- 49er
- 49er FX
- Cadet
- Contender
- Dart 18
- Division II
- Dragon
- Efsix
- Etchells
- FF 65
- Finn
- Flits
- Flying Dutchman
- Formula 16
- Formula 18
- Formula Kite
- Formula Windsurfing
- G2
- H-boat
- Hansa (2.3, 303, and Liberty) and Skud 18
- Hobie 16
- Hobie 18
- Hobie Dragoon
- Iepen Fryske Kampioenskippen Skûtsjesilen
- ILCA (4, 6, and 7)
- International A-class catamaran
- International FJ
- International Funboard
- International Marblehead
- IRC
- iQFoil
- iQFoil
- J/22
- J/24
- J/70
- J/80
- kiteboarding GKA
- Kona One
- Lemsteraken V/VA
- Max Fun 25
- Moth
- Musto Skiff
- Nacra 15
- Nacra 17
- Nordic Folkboat
- O-Jolle
- ORC
- OK
- One Metre
- Optimist
- Pampus
- Pion
- Ronde- en Platbodem jachten (G, J, R, T, and K)
- Ronde- en Platbodem jachten (H, V, and Z)
- Raceboard
- Randmeer
- Regenboog
- RG 65
- RS Aero
- RS Feva
- RS500
- Sailhorse
- SB20
- Schakel
- Snelheid Wedstrijschepen
- Soling
- Solo
- Spanker
- Splash
- Splash Red
- Star
- Techno 293+
- Techno Wind Foil 130
- Texel Rating
- Tirion
- Top
- Valk
- Vaurien
- Vrijheid
- Windsurfer
- windsurfing PWA
- Wingfoil
- wingfoiling GWA
- Yngling

== See also ==
- Category:Dutch sailors (sport)
- Category:Olympic sailors for the Netherlands
- Category:Yacht clubs in the Netherlands
