= SKUD 18 =

Class of racing sailing boat

Boat
- Crew: 2 Paralympics: 1 Class 1 disabled sailor 1 female
- Draft: 1.7 m (5 ft 7 in)

Hull
- Hull weight: ~ 400 kg (880 lb); 165 kg (364 lb) (keel)
- LOA: 5.8 m (19 ft)
- LWL: 5.5 m (18 ft)
- Beam: 2.29 m (7 ft 6 in)

Sails
- Mainsail area: 10.5 m^{2} (113 sq ft)
- Jib/genoa area: 5 m^{2} (54 sq ft)
- Spinnaker area: 20 m^{2} (220 sq ft) (Asymmetric)

Racing
- RYA PN: 1000

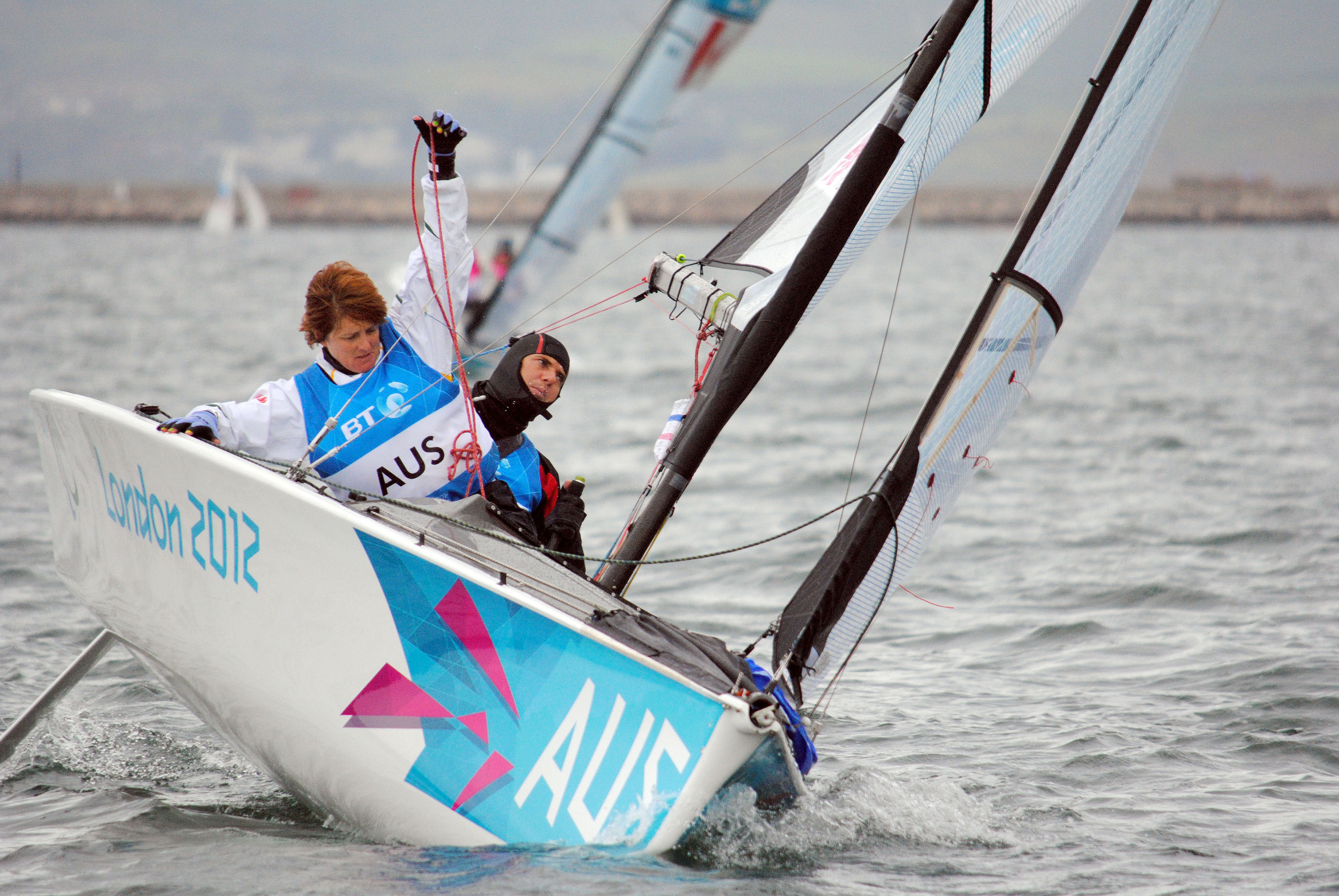
Skud competing at the Paralympics Games

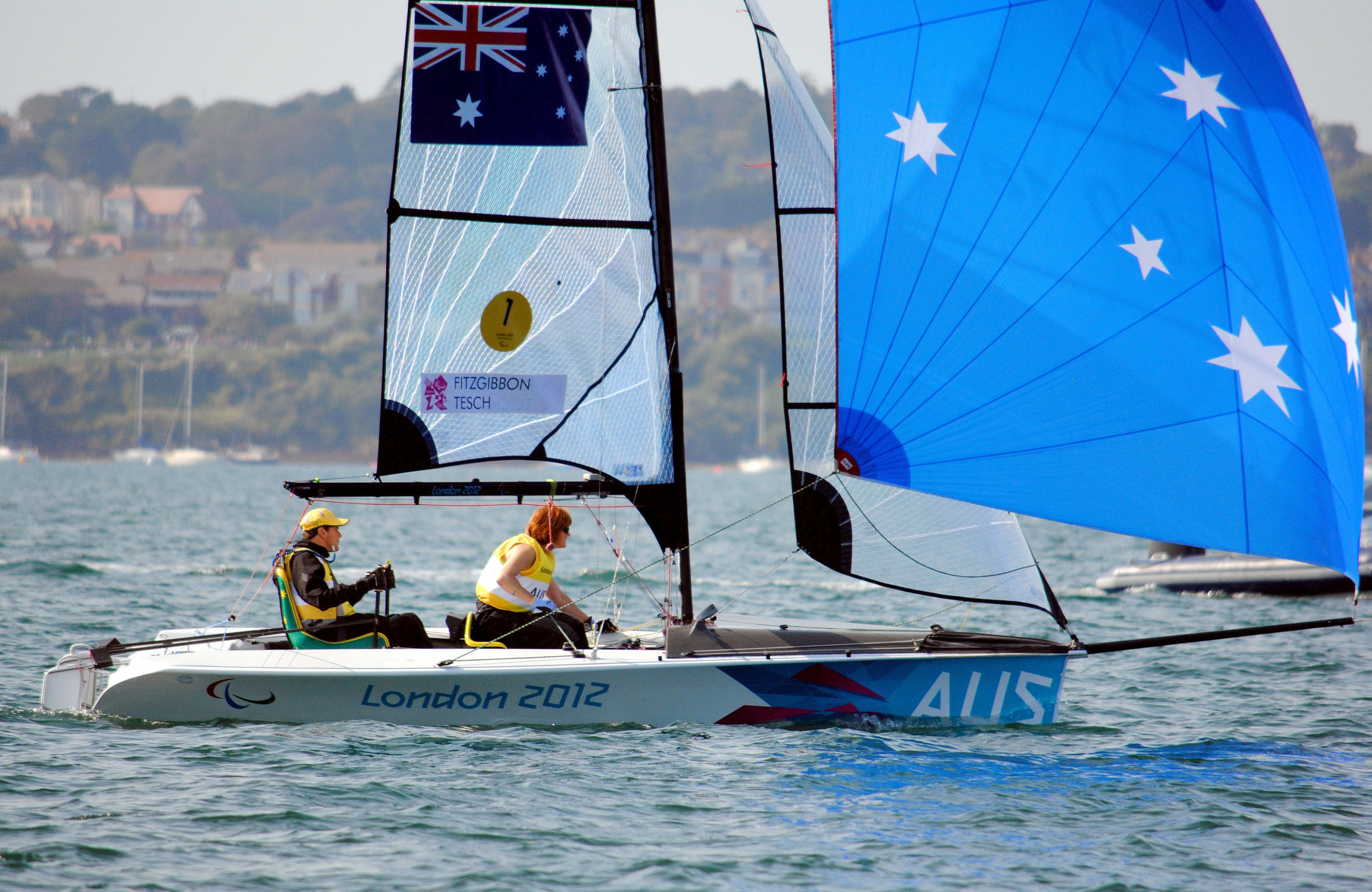
Skud competing at the Paralympics Games

The SKUD 18 is a class of racing sailing boat. It is a lead-assisted skiff with a tube-launched asymmetrical and a modern high performance stayed rig. The boat was created for trials held by the International Association for Disabled Sailing who were looking for a new two person boat for an additional medal allocated to sailing for the 2008 Paralympics.

== Background ==
This class is an example of Universal Design, providing a pathway within mainstream sailing for sailors ranging from entry-level to elite competition. The keelboat is designed for use by both able-bodied and disabled athletes, allowing for equitable competition among sailors with varying levels of disability.

=== History ===
The SKUD 18 was developed as a concept for the International Association for Disabled Sailing's trials for a new two-person Paralympic class for the Beijing Paralympics. Designed as a strict one-design class, the boat can be configured to accommodate different sailors' needs, including the use or removal of centerline seating used in Paralympic competition. The SKUD 18 has also been used for training sailors transitioning to high-performance skiffs or dinghies, as well as by older sailors seeking a high-performance racing experience with reduced physical demands.

=== Design ===
The SKUD 18 is a result of collaboration between Chris Mitchell of Access Sailing and Julian Bethwaite of Bethwaite Design, both in Australia, along with Argentine naval architect Martin Billoch.

“The design evolved as a 5.8m LAS, capable of carrying weight whilst maintaining a high level of performance and control. Cost has been kept low, is easy to stack and containerize, requires simple maintenance and offers ease of use. The boat will be a challenge for able-bodied and disabled sailors alike. The SKUD 18 has been designed from a performance basis to offer scintillating, crisp and snappy response to sailors regardless of their mobility.” - Julian Bethwaite, designer of the Olympic class 49er skiff

“The SKUD 18 is very versatile and can be handled by a variety of crew configurations. The helmsperson can transfer manually and be steering with tillers, or be in a fixed seat on the centreline using a manual joystick, push/pull rods, or a servo assist joystick with full control of all functions. The forward crew can either be seated on the centreline, transferring manually, or on trapeze. As the name reflects, the SKUD 18 is a SKiff of Universal Design and can be sailed for fun or serious competition by people of all levels of physical ability.” - Chris Mitchell, designer of a range of accessible sailcraft

=== Universal Design ===
Universal Design is related to "inclusive design", "design for all" and “accessible design”. Universal Design differs from accessible design as accessible design means products and buildings that are accessible and usable by people with disabilities. Universal design means products and buildings that are accessible and usable by everyone—older people as well as young, women as well as men, left-handed persons as well as right-handed persons. It acknowledges disability, aging, and other differences as a part of everyday life. SKUD 2P in Paralympic format.

=== Adaptations for disabled people ===
“The purpose of servo systems is to allow the more severely disabled people to sail and to level up the playing field.” - Chris Mitchell, SKUD 18 servo assist system developer

Servo motors sailboats are generally used to allow people with mobility problems to enjoy the freedom and independence of sailing by themselves, sailing solo, something that many don't achieve in any other aspect of their lives. On two-person boats like the SKUD 18, the helmsperson may be a severely disabled sailor (SDS) so needs servo assisted steering, while the crew would generally control the sheets. But it is achievable to have a full servo system so that the SDS helmsperson can adjust sheets and other controls like the cunningham and outhaul as well. Access Sailing Systems servo assist equipment can easily be converted for manual use by disengaging the steering winch clutch and winding out all but a few inches of sheet and then hauling in the sheets by hand. On the SKUD 18, sheets are double ended and can be readily adjusted in either mode.

With its debut in the 2008 Paralympics, this was the first of the 3 keelboat classes to use a spinnaker, as well as the first Paralympic class to specify a severely disabled sailor and a female in the crew, with both sailors secured (with quick release) to their centerline seats for safety purposes. With its 140 kg bulb and 1.7 m draft, the 2-person SKUD 18, even with both crew on the centerline, has exceptional stability and is fail safe. Important considerations in being fail safe with a Severely Disabled Sailor (SDS) aboard in the worst situation, i.e., where the boat is broached/ lying on its side in wild conditions:

- SDS need to be strapped into a seat for body support.
- Their head must remain clear of the water even if all systems fail.
- Considerable buoyancy required under the side decks, considering that the sailor could be strapped into a leeward canted seat.
- There is escalating potential for danger if the sailor is in a sliding or transversely mobile seat, either manual or servo powered.
- Further, as high level quadriplegics are generally restricted to helming and it's considerably less complex to organise steering for a centreline seated quad, a fail safe seat for a quad should therefore be fixed on the centerline.
- The forward crew for 2008 Paralympics were also restricted to a centerline seat for same reasons. However this is not the ideal format for the boat, though it does allow those with limited mobility to attend to the other primary function of rig adjustments.

=== SKUD manufacturers ===
The SKUD 18 is built by Extreme Sailing Products in Batam, Indonesia for Access Sailing Systems. Run by two Australian boatbuilders, Tim Ross and Paul Paterson, XSP also produce the 49er, 29er, Tasar, Byte, 420, Optimist and a number of other classes. XSP were selected for their consistent high standards of workmanship and their efficient distribution location via Singapore.

=== Access Class Association ===
The SKUD is managed by the Access Class Association which also administers the Access 2.3, Access 303 and the Access Liberty

== Events ==
=== Paralympics ===
Sailing has been part of the Paralympic Games since 1996 and detailed information on each sailing event can be found on the following pages.

For the SKUD 18 class it debuted in Qingdao, China during the 2008 Summer Paralympic Games. Eleven nations competed on the 2-person keelboat, namely host country China, Canada, Australia, the United Kingdom, Ireland, Malaysia, Singapore, the Philippines, Portugal, Sweden, and the United States.

The entries criteria require at least one member of the crew to be female. This led to the first three women who've won Paralympic medals in sailing. Sailing competition athletes and full results.

"I'm very pleased to be the first woman ever to win a gold medal in Paralympic sailing in the SKUD 18 Class." Maureen McKinnon-Tucker

Year	Gold	Silver	Bronze
2008 Beijing	Nick Scandone and Maureen McKinnon-Tucker (USA)	Dan Fitzgibbon and Rachael Cox (AUS)	John McRoberts and Stacie Louttit (CAN)
2012 London	Dan Fitzgibbon and Liesl Tesch (AUS)	Jean-Paul Creignou and Jennifer French (USA)	Alexandra Rickham and Niki Birrell (GBR)
2016 Rio de Janeiro	Daniel Fitzgibbon; Liesl Tesch (AUS)	John McRoberts; Jackie Gay (CAN)	Alexandra Rickham; Niki Birrell (GBR)

=== IFDS Disabled Sailing World Championships ===
2011 IFDS Two-Person Keelboat World Championship

Event	Gold	Silver	Bronze
2011, Weymouth and Portland	Alexandra Rickham (GBR); Niki Birrell (GBR)	Jennifer French (USA); Jean-Paul Creignou (USA)	Daniel Fitzgibbon (AUS); Liesl Tesch (AUS)

2010 IFDS Two-Person Keelboat World Championship , The event was held in the Netherlands in Medmeblick from 6–14 July 2010 and sponsored by Delta Lloyd.

Event	Gold	Silver	Bronze
2010, Medemblik	Alexandra Rickham (GBR); Niki Birrell (GBR)	Scott Whitman (GBR); Julia Dorsett (GBR)	Daniel Fitzgibbon (AUS); Rachael Cox (AUS)

2008 IFDS Two-Person Keelboat World Championship , Changi, Singapore.
The second and final Paralympic qualifying event for the SKUD class. Held at the SAF Yacht Club, from 23 to 27 March 2008. The final 4 countries qualified: Ireland, Malaysia, the Philippines and Singapore.

Medal	SKUD Skipper	Crew
Gold	Jovin Tan (SIN)	Desiree Lim
Silver	Jia Hai Liang (CHN)	Yu Huawu
Bronze	Bento Amaral (POR)	Luisa Silvano

2007 IFDS World Championship , Rochester, NY, United States.
Held from 7–15 September 2007 by the Rochester Yacht Club, this was the first Paralympic qualifying event for the SKUD and included the 2.4mR and Sonar classes. In the SKUD class, the first 6 countries qualified: Australia, Canada, Great Britain, Portugal and the United States. China as Paralympic host country automatically qualified for 1 slot.

Medal	SKUD Skipper	Crew
Gold	Karen Mitchell (United States)	JP Creignou
Silver	Nick Scandone (United States)	Maureen McKinnon-Tucker (USA)
Bronze	Carl-Gustaf Fresk (SWE)	Annika Lindgren (SWE)

=== Other events ===
Bruce Wake International SKUD 18 Open Meeting

Event	Gold	Silver	Bronze
2010, Rutland	Alexandra Rickham (GBR); Niki Birrell (GBR)	Michael Cogswell (GBR); Liz Foreman (GBR)	Jean Claude Mirc (FRA); Gerard Eychenne (FRA)
