= 2023 Sailing World Championships – Men's Hansa 303 =

Men's Hansa 303 at the 2023 Sailing World Championships
- Venue: The Hague, the Netherlands
- Dates: 11–16 August
- Competitors: 15 from 15 nations

Medalists
gold medal	Piotr Cichocki	Poland
silver medal	Takumi Niwa	Japan
bronze medal	João Pinto	Portugal

The men's Hansa 303 competition at the 2023 Sailing World Championships was the men's one-person non-technical para event and was held in The Hague, the Netherlands, 11–16 August 2023. The entries were limited to 50 boats. The competitors participated in a series that was planned to 10 races. The last race was planned for 16 August.

== Summary ==
Piotr Cichocki of Poland had won the 2022 Para World Sailing Championships in Hiroshima before Gauthier Bril of France.

Cichocki took the lead with a total of three points in two races, one point ahead of Takumi Niwa of Japan. Cichocki secured the championship title on the penultimate day, being nine points ahead of Niwa.

== Results ==
Results of individual races
Pos	Helmsman	Country	I	II	III	IV	V	VI	VII	VIII	IX	X	Tot	Pts
Gold medal	Piotr Cichocki	Poland	1	2	5^{†}	1	2	1	1	1	1	1	16	11
Silver medal	Takumi Niwa	Japan	3	1	2	6^{†}	1	3	2	3	4	5	30	24
Bronze medal	João Pinto	Portugal	4	5	4	3	6^{†}	4	4	5	3	3	41	35
4	Rory McKinna	Great Britain	5	9^{†}	1	5	9	6	6	6	2	2	51	42
5	Jens Kroker	Germany	8	10^{†}	3	2	5	2	7	2	6	7	52	42
6	Gauthier Bril	France	2	6	8^{†}	4	4	5	3	8	7	4	51	43
7	Carmelo Forastieri	Italy	10	7	7	7	3	8	5	UFD 16^{†}	5	6	74	58
8	Sergio Roig	Spain	9^{†}	8	6	8	7	7	8	4	8	8	73	64
9	Jim Thweatt	United States	6	4	9	STP 10	8	10	11	UFD 16^{†}	10	11	95	79
10	Wai On Fung	Hong Kong	7	12^{†}	10	11	10	9	9	10	11	12	101	89
11	Peter Coleman	Australia	12	14	11	RET 16^{†}	11	11	10	9	9	9	112	96
12	Naser Mohammed	Oman	11	3	14	DNF 16^{†}	14	14	12	7	14	13	118	102
13	Leung Wun Wa	Macau	DNF 16^{†}	11	12	10	12	13	15	12	15	10	126	110
14	Peter Idar	Sweden	DNF 16^{†}	13	13	DNF 16	13	12	14	11	13	14	135	119
15	Jurrian Raa	Netherlands	DNF 16^{†}	15	DNS 16	RET 16	15	15	13	13	12	15	146	130

Scoring system: low-point system; Source:
Legend: DNF – Did not finish; DNS – Did not start; RET – Retired; STP – Standard penalty imposed; UFD – "U" flag disqualification; † – Discarded race not counted in the overall result;
