= Jennifer French (sailor) =

American SKUD 18 Para sailor

Personal information
- Born: 1971 (age 54–55) Royalton, Ohio, U.S.

Sailing career
- Sport: Sailing
- Club: St. Petersburg Yacht Club
- Class: SKUD 18
Medal record
Sailing
Representing United States
Paralympic Games
Silver medal – second place	2012 London	SKUD 18
IFDS World Championships
Silver medal – second place	2011	SKUD 18

Jennifer French (born 1971) is an American SKUD 18 Para sailor.

== Biography ==
French was born in Royalton, Ohio. She attended Bridgewater State University and is a member of St. Petersburg Yacht Club She is married to Tim French and is friends with P. Hunter Peckham, who is a physician at the Functional Electrical Stimulation director and a sail boat racer as well.

French was paralyzed after she damaged her spinal cord while snowboarding in 1998.

She started participating in the Olympics in 2009 at the United States Disabled Sailing Championship, where she earned first place. She took fifth place at Rolex Miami OCR the same year, and first place the following year. Her awards went down from gold to bronze in two years. In 2011, she won a silver medal at IFDS Worlds and a year later went down to bronze at another annual Rolex Miami ISAF Sailing World Cup. At the 2012 Summer Paralympics in London, she won another silver medal for sailing.

== Outreach and Advocacy ==
Jennifer French is the author of the book "On My Feet Again" (published 2012) and a speaker at the 2018 TedX Berkeley conference (https://www.youtube.com/watch?v=tkspAQW_2sQ). In the book she describes her experiences with new technologies intended for individuals with spinal cord injury. She uses the perspective of a participant in a clinical trial to tell the story of an implanted neuro-prosthetic system that enables her to stand up out of her wheelchair and move around on her own feet. She is an avid advocate for equal rights and equal treatment of individuals with disabilities and has presented at numerous technology and medical device conferences to highlight the equalizing effect that technology has in today's world.
