= International Access 2.3 =

Boat
- Crew: Single
- Draft: 0.9 m (2 ft 11 in)

Hull
- Hull weight: 52 kg (115 lb)
- LOA: 2.3 m (7 ft 7 in)
- Beam: 1.25 m (4 ft 1 in)

Rig
- Mast height: 4.2 m (14 ft)

Sails
- Mainsail area: 3.8 m^{2} (41 sq ft)

The Access 2.3 is a single-crew cat rigged sailing keelboat, which is recognised by the International Sailing Federation as an international class. It is typically regarded as being a beginner's dinghy.

== Background ==
=== Performance and design ===
The Access 2.3 differs from the majority of dinghies in that is controlled by a joystick, rather than a tiller, and the single crew is seated facing forwards. The crew does not switch sides during a tack and the boom is rigged high so as to avoid the helm's head during a tack.

The boat is generally regarded as being a good beginner's boat for someone new to sailing, due to its stability and the ease with which it can be sailed.

Because the boat can be equipped with servo assist electric controls it is possible for those with physical disabilities to sail it by themselves.

=== Access 2.3 wide ===
There is also a wide version of the Access 2.3 which can accommodate for two average sized adults, although it is still capable of being sailed by a single crew.

== Events ==
=== World Championships ===
Event	Gold	Silver	Bronze
2007, Whitby	Duncan MacGregor (AUS)	Clare Andrew (GBR)	Debbie Boys (AUS)
2010, Rutland	Angus MacGregor (AUS)	Monique Foster (GBR)	Bruno Pereira (POR)
2012, Sydney	Angus MacGregor (AUS)	Duncan MacGregor (AUS)	Gerard Meli (AUS)
2016, Medemblik	Al Mustakim Matrin (MAS)	Fernando Pinto (POR)	Luisa Graca (POR)
2018, Hiroshima	Chris Ruston (AUS)	Lindsay Burns (GBR)	Neil Rowsthorn (AUS)
2023, Portimao	Andrzej Bury (POL)	Yui Fujimoto (JPN)	Antonio Nobrega (POR)

== See also ==
- Access 303
- Access Liberty (keelboat)
- SKUD 18
