= Disability classification in sailing =

Disability sport classification system

Disability sailing classification is the method of allowing sailors with different disabilities to compete, with classification being based on vision, mobility, stability and hand function. Classification is handled by the International Association for Disabled Sailing (IFDS).

== Definition ==
Disability sailing is for people with physical disabilities and vision impairments. Classification is based on vision, mobility, stability and hand function.

== Governance ==
The sport is governed and classification handled by the International Federation for Disabled Sailing (IFDS). The US Disabled Sailing Team is in charge of classification in the United States. Sailing for people with intellectual disabilities is governed by the Special Olympics.

== Eligibility ==
As of 2012, people with visual and physical disabilities are eligible to compete in this sport.

== Sports ==
Sailors with physical disabilities may compete on the same team as people with vision impairment. Competitions are also mixed genders.

== Process ==
During the classification process, a sailor needs to wear any prosthesis or special equipment they expect to use during competition. For Australian competitors in this sport, the sport and classification is managed the national sport federation with support from the Australian Paralympic Committee. There are three types of classification available for Australian competitors: Provisional, national and international. The first is for club level competitions, the second for state and national competitions, and the third for international competitions.

== At the Paralympic Games ==
At the 1992 Summer Paralympics, all disability types were eligible to participate, with classification being run through an independent classifier. At the 2000 Summer Paralympics, 11 assessments were conducted at the Games. This resulted in 4 class changes.

For the 2016 Summer Paralympics in Rio, the International Paralympic Committee had a zero classification at the Games policy. This policy was put into place in 2014, with the goal of avoiding last minute changes in classes that would negatively impact athlete training preparations. All competitors needed to be internationally classified with their classification status confirmed prior to the Games, with exceptions to this policy being dealt with on a case-by-case basis. In case there was a need for classification or reclassification at the Games despite best efforts otherwise, sailing classification was scheduled for September 9, while it was scheduled for September 4 to 6 for visually impaired sailors at Marina da Gloria. For sportspeople with physical or intellectual disabilities going through classification or reclassification in Rio, their in competition observation event is their first appearance in competition at the Games.

== Future ==
Going forward, disability sport's major classification body, the International Paralympic Committee, is working on improving classification to be more of an evidence-based system as opposed to a performance-based system so as not to punish elite athletes whose performance makes them appear in a higher class alongside competitors who train less.
