= Rachael Cox =

Australian Paralympic sailor

Personal information
- Nationality: Australia
- Born: 13 September 1975 (age 50)
Medal record
Sailing
Paralympic Games
Silver medal – second place	2008 Beijing	Mixed Two Person SKUD18

Rachael Cox (born 13 September 1975) is an Australian Paralympic sailor. She won a silver medal at the 2008 Beijing Games in the Mixed Two Person SKUD18 event.
