= Royalton, Ohio =

Unincorporated community in Ohio, U.S.

Coordinates: 39°43′39″N 82°46′00″W

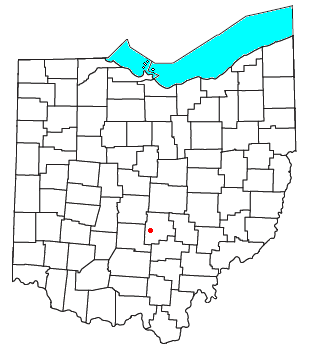
Location of Royalton, Ohio

Royalton is an unincorporated community in northern Amanda Township, Fairfield County, Ohio, United States.

== History ==
Royalton was laid out in 1810. An early variant name was Tobytown. A post office was established at Royalton in 1818, and remained in operation until 1909.

== Geography ==
The village lies at the intersection of Royalton and Amanda-Northern Roads. Located in the west of the county, it lies approximately 9 miles (14 km) west of central Lancaster (the county seat of Fairfield County) and 6 miles (9.7 km) north of the village of Amanda. The nearest body of running water is a small creek, which eventually empties into the Hocking River.

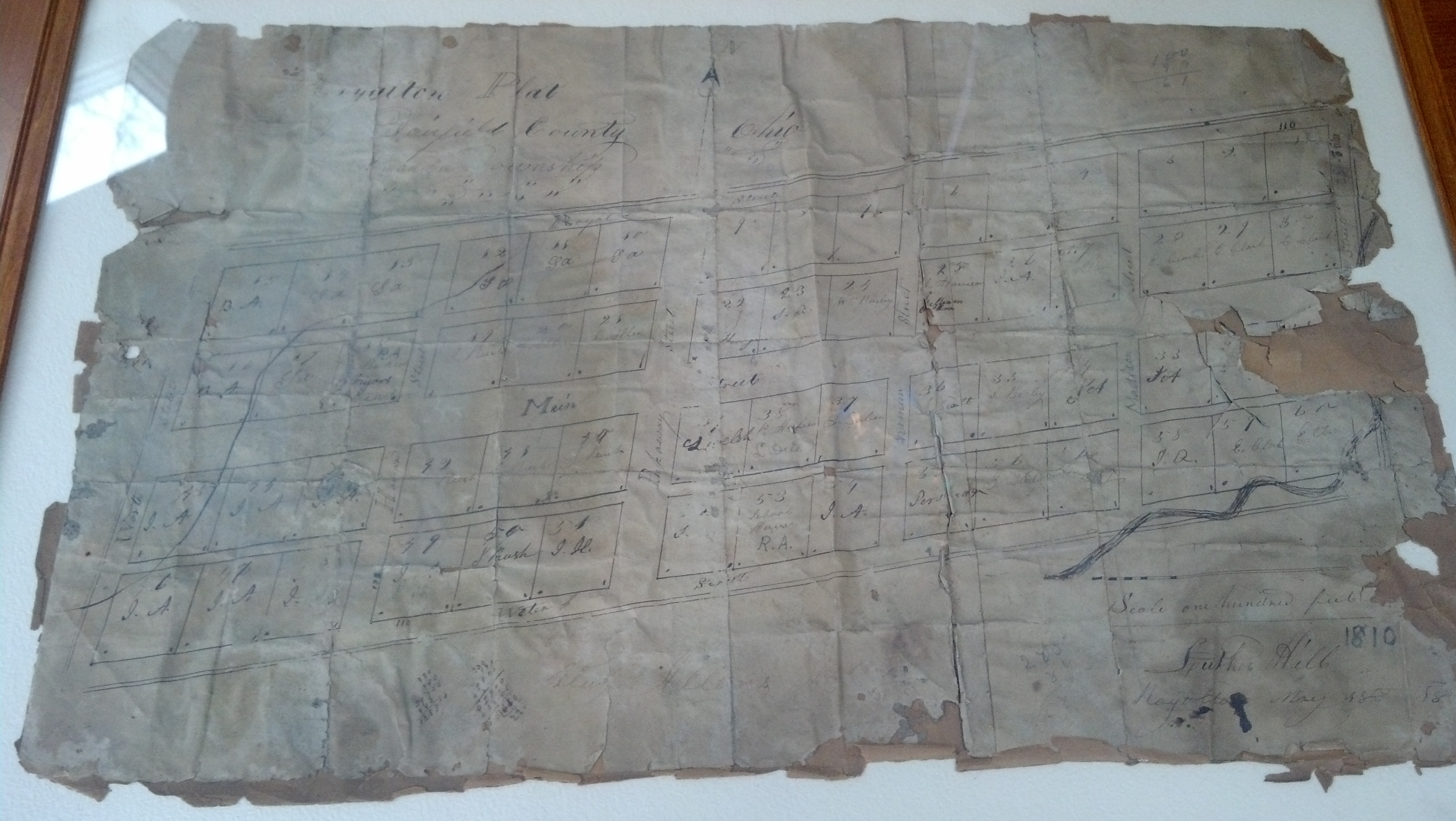
Silas Allen's 1810 Royalton, Ohio Plat Map

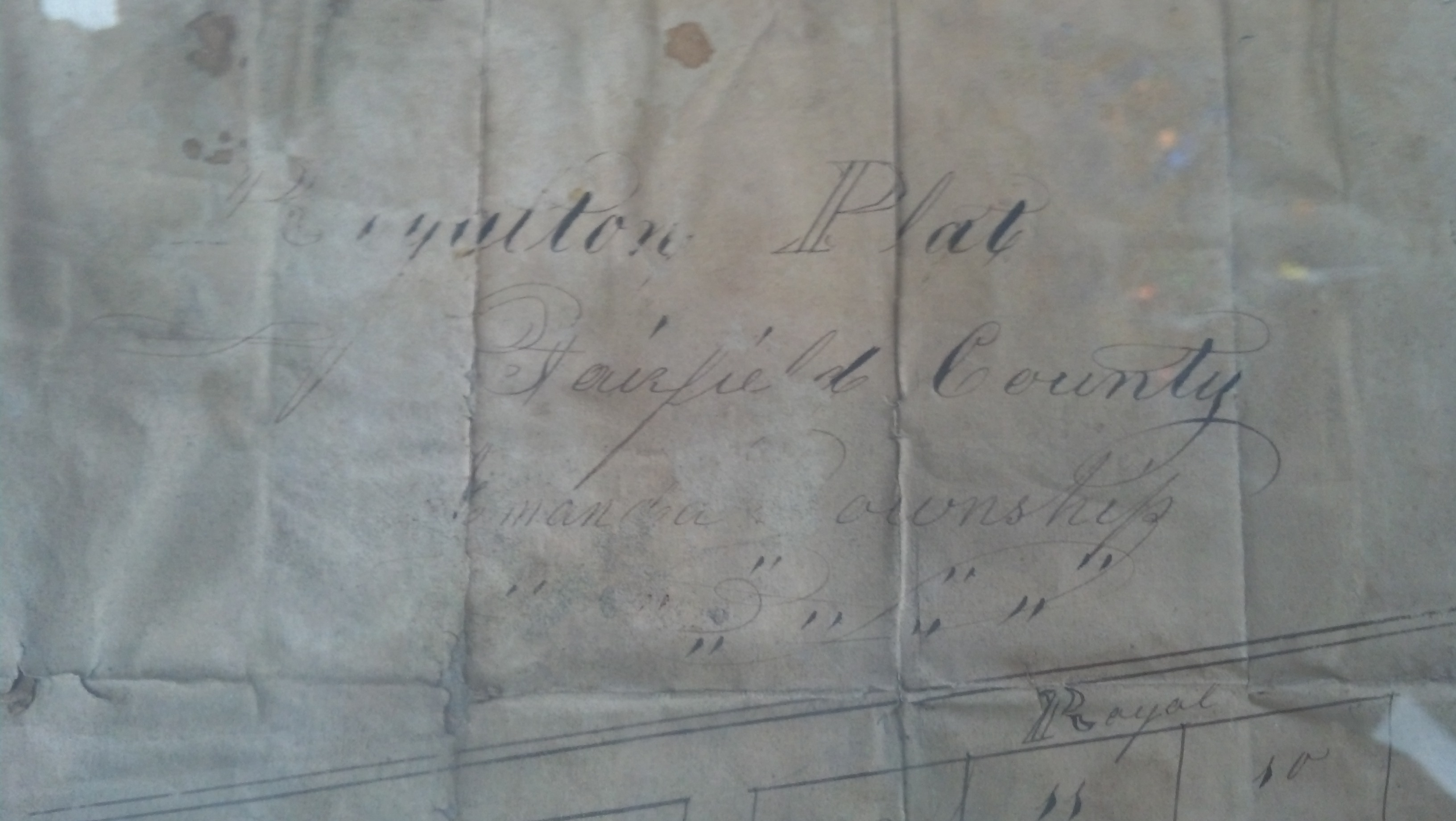
Silas Allen's 1810 Royalton Ohio Plat Map
