= Randmeer =

The Randmeer is a medium size sailing boat designed by E. G. van de Stadt. In the Netherlands it is often used for One-Design sailing races. Developed in the 1960s it was made especially for sailing on the so-called randmeren; narrow shallow lakes that surround the newly created Flevopolders. This makes the boat perfect for rough but shallow waters.

== Size ==
The Randmeer is 6.50 meters long and 2.10 meters wide. The hull weighs 500 kilograms. The draft can vary, depending on whether it has a centreboard, between 0.55 and 1.15 meters. The mainsail has a surface area of 11.4 m^{2}, the jib has a surface area of 7.7 m^{2}. The 'Touring' type has a jib of 5.6 m^{2}. In addition it can be sailed with a spinnaker of 19.5 m^{2}. All boats are produced at the shipyard in Heeg, Friesland, The Netherlands.

== Types ==
Within the Randmeer class there are three types: the Classic; the Advance; and the Touring. The Classic, as can inferred from the name, is the original design that dates back to 1964. The Classic has a kielmidzwaard, a combination of a not-too-long keel with a retractable centreboard inside it. This means that its draft can vary between 0.55 and 1.15 meters.

The most obvious difference between the Classic and the Advance is that the Advance cabin floor is higher. Due to this shallower cabin the Advance is completely self-baling. Moreover, except for the rudder, all wood has disappeared from the design. Similar to the Classic the Advance has a kielmidzwaard.

The Touring type is made for recreational use only. The hull is almost the same as the Advance, but it has a fixed keel, with a total draft of 0.75 meters. In addition, this ship has a pierced rudder; i.e. it goes through the hull instead of being hung behind it. This means that the Touring type does not comply with the One-Class design.

Van de Stadt also designed a version with a cabin: the Trotter. This has later been developed into the Trotter Pandora, often built in England.
