= Hansa 303 =

Boat
- Crew: Single or Two
- Draft: 1 m (3 ft 3 in)

Hull
- Hull weight: 62 kg (137 lb)
- LOA: 3.03 m (9.9 ft)
- Beam: 1.35 m (4 ft 5 in)

Rig
- Mast height: 4.75 m (15.6 ft)

Sails
- Mainsail area: 4.4 m^{2} (47 sq ft)
- Jib/genoa area: 1.4 m^{2} (15 sq ft)
- Upwind sail area: 5.8 m^{2} (62 sq ft)

The Access 303 is a single or two crew sailing keelboat, which is recognised by the International Sailing Federation as an international class. It is typically regarded as being a beginner's dinghy.

== Performance and design ==
The Access 303 is similar to the Access 2.3 of the same class. It has the same joystick control, as well as the high boom and the setup whereby the helm and crew are sat facing forwards. It also has the same electric servo-assisted drives, making it suitable for people with physical disabilities.

Like the 2.3 the 303 has the same low ballast and high sides, which adds to the stability of the boat.

The rigging of the 303 differs from the 2.3 in that it has been raised and a jib has been added. Although the jib is self-tacking the addition of it to the rigging does mean that the crew have an extra sail to trim which adds some complexity in comparison to the 2.3. Another change from the 2.3 is the possibility to sail the 303 as a two-man boat, although it is still possible to sail it solo. This means that the boat is suitable for coaching, as the coach can sit in the boat with the crew and let them run over the various aspects of control in a whilst on the water, and can take complete control of the boat if necessary.

=== Access 303 sport ===
There is also an Access 303 sport, which is single crew only, and is designed for more experienced sailors who wish to try sailing solo.

== Events ==
=== World Championships ===
==== Single ====
Event	Gold	Silver	Bronze
2007 Whitby	Michael Leydon (AUS)	Jim Brown (AUS)	Zoltán Pegan (HUN)
2010 Rutland	Zoltán Pegan (HUN)	Chris Ruston (AUS)	Gerard Eychenne (FRA)
2012 Sydney	Michael Leydon (AUS)	Stephen Churm (AUS)	Rodney Viney (AUS)
2016 Medemblik	Chris Symonds (AUS)	Willi Lutz (SUI)	Pedro Reis (POR)
2018 Hiroshima	Piotr Cichocki (POL)	Chris Symonds (AUS)	Takumi Niwa (JPN)
2021 Palermo	Piotr Cichocki (POL)	Cécile Venuat (FRA)	Rory Mckinna (GBR)
2023 Portimao	Piotr Cichocki (POL)	João Pinto (POR)	Rory Mckinna (GBR)

==== Double ====
Event	Gold	Silver	Bronze
2007 Whitby	Eva Mircev (HUN); Zoltán Pegan (HUN)	Michael Leydon (AUS); Debbie Boys (AUS)	Jim Brown (AUS); Tish Ennis (AUS)
2010 Rutland	Eva Mircev (HUN); Zoltán Pegan (HUN)	Andi Garcia (GBR); Ian McNairn (GBR)	Kenji Sasahara (JPN); Yumiko Suzuki (JPN)
2012 Sydney	Michael Leydon (AUS); Patricia Ennis (AUS)	Eva Mircev (HUN); Zoltán Pegan (HUN)	Mark Thorpe (AUS); Bruce James (AUS)
2016 Medemblik	Patrick Maurer (SWI); Christian Hiller (SWI)	Michael Darby (AUS); Chris Symonds (AUS)	Gilles Guyon (FRA); Olivier Ducruix (FRA)
2018 Hiroshima	Yuna Nakayama (JPN); Sarina Shibata (JPN)	Michael Darby (AUS); Chris Symonds (AUS)	Patrick Maurer (SWI); Christian Hiller (SWI)
2021 Palermo	Ela Klinger (AUS); Chris Symonds (AUS)	Piotr Cichocki (POL); Olga Gornas-Grudzien (POL)	Gilles Guyon (FRA); Olivier Ducruix (FRA)
2023 Portimao	Piotr Cichocki (POL); Joanna Cichocka (POL)	Gilles Guyon (FRA); Anne Marteau (FRA)	Michael Darby (AUS); Chris Symonds (AUS)

=== Para World Sailing Championships ===
==== Men ====
Year	Gold	Silver	Bronze
2017 Kiel	Piotr Cichocki (POL)	Christopher Symonds (AUS)	Jens Kroker (GER)
2023 The Hague	Piotr Cichocki (POL)	Takumi Niwa (JPN)	João Pinto (POR)

==== Women ====
Year	Gold	Silver	Bronze
2017 Kiel	Violeta del Reino Diez del Valle (ESP)	Ana Paula Gonçalves Marques (BRA)	Cherrie Pinpin (PHI)
2023 The Hague	Betsy Alison (USA)	Olga Górnaś-Grudzień (POL)	Alison Weatherly (AUS)

== See also ==
- Access 2.3
- Access Liberty (keelboat)
