= Access Liberty =

Boat
- Crew: 2 (max 150 kg)
- Draft: 1.1 m (3 ft 7 in)

Hull
- Hull weight: 72 kg (159 lb); Ballast 72 kg (159 lb); Boat Weight 155 kg (342 lb)
- LOA: 3.6 m (12 ft)
- Beam: 1.35 m (4 ft 5 in)

Sails
- Mainsail area: 5.6 m^{2} (60 sq ft)
- Jib/genoa area: 1.75 m^{2} (18.8 sq ft)

The Access Liberty keelboat was designed by Chris Mitchell, and was first launched by its Australian builders Access. The class is recognised by the International Sailing Federation.

== World Champions ==
Event	Gold	Silver	Bronze
2010, Rutland	Magali Moraines (FRA)	Chris Cook (AUS)	Barry Coates (AUS)
Servo Assist; 2010, Rutland	Melvin Kinnear (GB)	Wilma van den Broek (NED)	Vera Voorbach (NED)
2012, Sydney	Greg Hyde (AUS)	Chris Cook (AUS)	Gerard Eychenne (FRA)
Servo Assist; 2012, Sydney	Helena Horswell (NZL)	Wilma van den Broek (NED)	Sefke Jan Holtrop (NED)
2016, Medemblik	Sarah Dunkley (NZL)	Azmi Ani (MAS)	Gerard Beens (NED)
Servo Assist; 2016, Medemblik	Vera Voorbach (NED)	Wilma van den Broek (NED)	Helena Horswell (NZL)
2018, Hiroshima	Bob Schahinger (AUS)	Gerard Eychenne (FRA)	Vera Voorbach (NED)
Servo Assist; 2018, Hiroshima	Vera Voorbach (NED)	Hanneke Deenen (NED)	Takaya Aono (JPN)
2021, Palermo	Vera Voorbach (NED)	Gerard Eychenne (FRA)	Paul Phillips (GBR)
Servo Assist; 2021, Palermo	Vera Voorbach (NED)	Hanneke Deenen (NED)	Wilma van den Broek (NED)
2023, Portimao	Gerard Eychenne (FRA)	Paul Phillips (GBR)	Vera Voorbach (NED)
Servo Assist; 2023, Portimao	Vera Voorbach (NED)	Hanneke Deenen (NED)	Wilma van den Broek (NED)
