= Hull (watercraft) =

Watertight buoyant body of a ship or boat

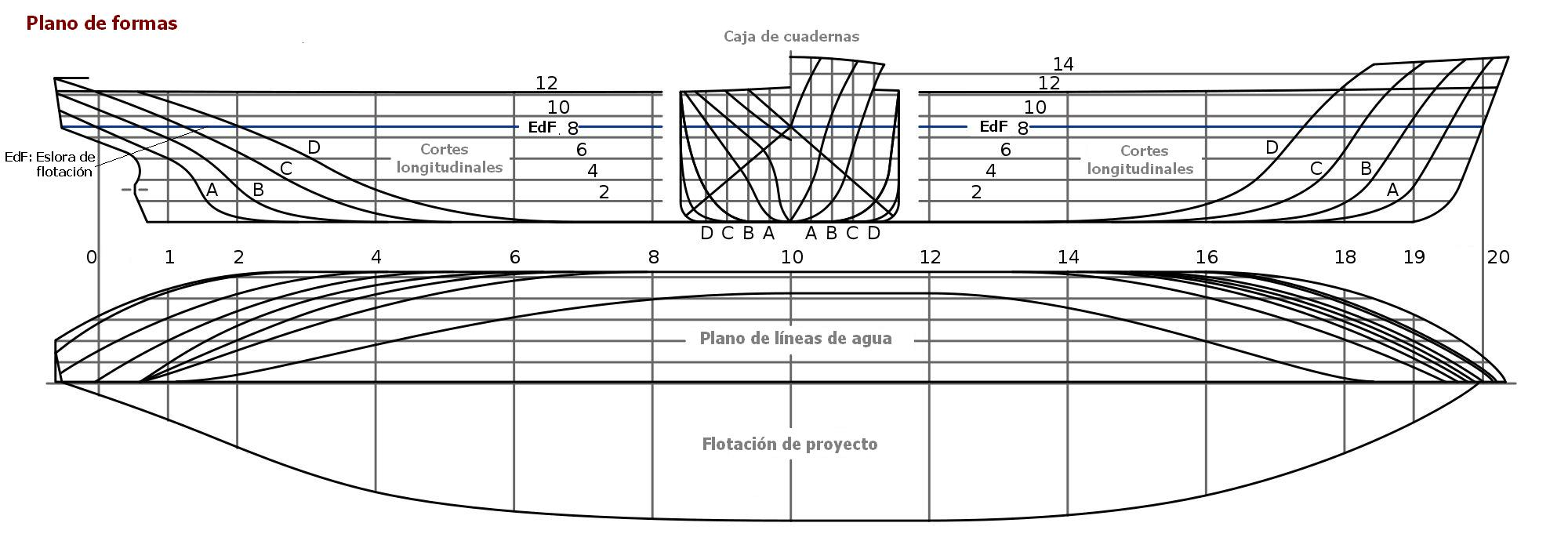
Hull form lines, lengthwise and in cross-section

A hull is the watertight body of a ship, boat, submarine, or flying boat. The hull may open at the top (such as a dinghy), or it may be fully or partially covered with a deck. Atop the deck may be a deckhouse and other superstructures, such as a funnel, derrick, or mast. The line where the hull meets the water surface is called the waterline.

== General features ==
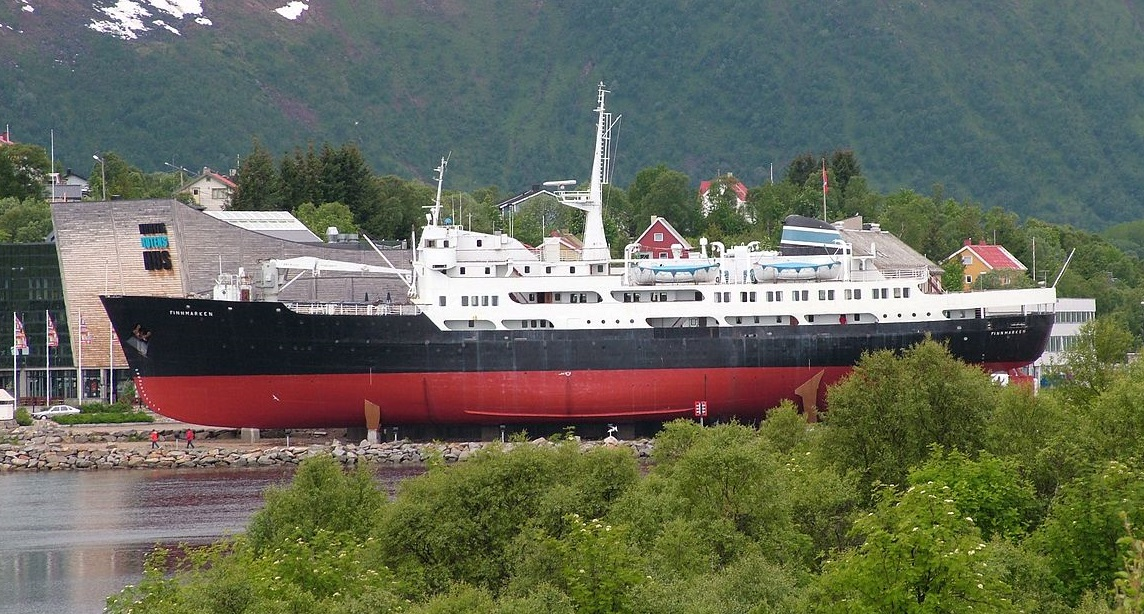
Ship above the water with the entire hull visible

There is a wide variety of hull types that are chosen for suitability for different usages, the hull shape being dependent upon the needs of the design. Shapes range from a nearly perfect box, in the case of scow barges, to a needle-sharp surface of revolution in the case of a racing multihull sailboat. The shape is chosen to strike a balance between cost, hydrostatic considerations (accommodation, load carrying, and stability), hydrodynamics (speed, power requirements, and motion and behavior in a seaway) and special considerations for the ship's role, such as the rounded bow of an icebreaker or the flat bottom of a landing craft.

In a typical modern steel ship, the hull will have watertight decks, and major transverse members called bulkheads. There may also be intermediate members such as girders, stringers and webs, and minor members called ordinary transverse frames, frames, or longitudinals, depending on the structural arrangement. The uppermost continuous deck may be called the "upper deck", "weather deck", "spar deck", "main deck", or simply "deck". The particular name given depends on the context—the type of ship or boat, the arrangement, or even where it sails.

In a typical wooden sailboat, the hull is constructed of wooden planking, supported by transverse frames (often referred to as ribs) and bulkheads, which are further tied together by longitudinal stringers or ceiling. Often but not always there is a centerline longitudinal member called a keel. In fiberglass or composite hulls, the structure may resemble wooden or steel vessels to some extent, or be of a monocoque arrangement. In many cases, composite hulls are built by sandwiching thin fiber-reinforced skins over a lightweight but reasonably rigid core of foam, balsa wood, impregnated paper honeycomb, or other material.

Perhaps the earliest proper hulls were built by the Ancient Egyptians, who by 3000 BC knew how to assemble wooden planks into a hull.

== Hull shapes ==
Hulls come in many varieties and can have composite shape, (e.g., a fine entry forward and inverted bell shape aft), but are grouped primarily as follows:

- Chined and hard-chined. Examples are the flat-bottom (chined), v-bottom, and multi-chine hull (several gentler hard chines, still not smooth). These types have at least one pronounced knuckle throughout all or most of their length.
- Moulded, round bilged or soft-chined. These hull shapes all have smooth curves. Examples are the round bilge, semi-round bilge, and s-bottom hull.

=== Planing and displacement hulls ===
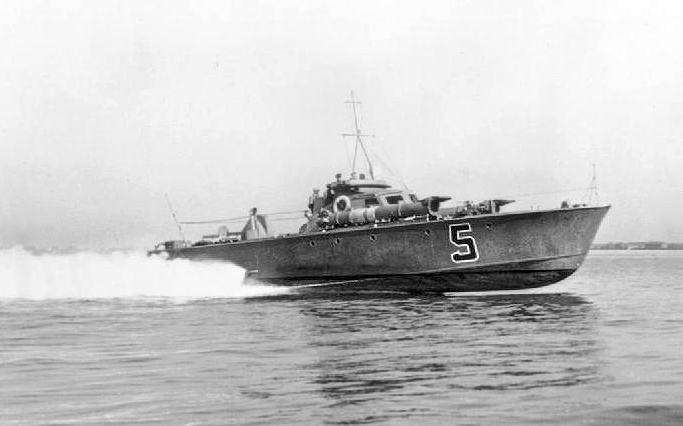
Royal Navy World War II MTB planing at speed on calm water showing its hard chine hull with most of the forepart of the boat out of the water.

- Displacement hull: here the hull is supported exclusively or predominantly by buoyancy. Vessels that have this type of hull travel through the water at a limited rate that is defined by the waterline length except for especially narrow hulls such as sailing multihulls that are less limited this way.
- Planing hull: here, the planing hull form is configured to develop positive dynamic pressure so that its draft decreases with increasing speed. The dynamic lift reduces the wetted surface and therefore also the drag. Such hulls are sometimes flat-bottomed, sometimes V-bottomed and more rarely, round-bilged. The most common form is to have at least one chine, which makes for more efficient planing and can throw spray down. Planing hulls are more efficient at higher speeds, although they still require more energy to achieve these speeds. An effective planing hull must be as light as possible with flat surfaces that are consistent with good sea keeping. Sailboats that plane must also sail efficiently in displacement mode in light winds.
- Semi-displacement, or semi-planing: here the hull form is capable of developing a moderate amount of dynamic lift; however, most of the vessel's weight is still supported through buoyancy.

=== Hull forms ===
At present, the most widely used form is the round bilge hull.

With a small payload, such a craft has less of its hull below the waterline, giving less resistance and more speed. With a greater payload, resistance is greater and speed lower, but the hull's outward bend provides smoother performance in waves. As such, the inverted bell shape is a popular form used with planing hulls.

==== Chined and hard-chined hulls ====
A chined hull does not have a smooth rounded transition between bottom and sides. Instead, its contours are interrupted by sharp angles where predominantly longitudinal panels of the hull meet. The sharper the intersection (the more acute the angle), the "harder" the chine. More than one chine per side is possible.

The Cajun "pirogue" is an example of a craft with hard chines.

Benefits of this type of hull include potentially lower production cost and a (usually) fairly flat bottom, making the boat faster at planing. A hard chined hull resists rolling (in smooth water) more than does a hull with rounded bilges (the chine creates turbulence and drag resisting the rolling motion, as it moves through the water, the rounded-bilge provides less flow resistance around the turn). In rough seas, this can make the boat roll more, as the motion drags first down, then up, on a chine: round-bilge boats are more seakindly in waves, as a result.

Chined hulls may have one of three shapes:

- Flat-bottom chined hulls
- Multi-chined hulls
- V-bottom chined hulls. Sometimes called hard chine.

Each of these chine hulls has its own unique characteristics and use. The flat-bottom hull has high initial stability but high drag. To counter the high drag, hull forms are narrow and sometimes severely tapered at bow and stern. This leads to poor stability when heeled in a sailboat. This is often countered by using heavy interior ballast on sailing versions. They are best suited to sheltered inshore waters. Early racing power boats were fine forward and flat aft. This produced maximum lift and a smooth, fast ride in flat water, but this hull form is easily unsettled in waves. The multi-chine hull approximates a curved hull form. It has less drag than a flat-bottom boat. Multi chines are more complex to build but produce a more seaworthy hull form. They are usually displacement hulls. V or arc-bottom chine boats have a V shape between 6° and 23°. This is called the deadrise angle. The flatter shape of a 6-degree hull will plane with less wind or a lower-horsepower engine but will pound more in waves. The deep V form (between 18 and 23 degrees) is only suited to high-powered planing boats. They require more powerful engines to lift the boat onto the plane but give a faster, smoother ride in waves. Displacement chined hulls have more wetted surface area, hence more drag, than an equivalent round-hull form, for any given displacement.

==== Smooth curve hulls ====
Smooth curve hulls are hulls that use, just like the curved hulls, a centreboard, or an attached keel.

Semi round bilge hulls are somewhat less round. The advantage of the semi-round is that it is a nice middle between the S-bottom and chined hull. Typical examples of a semi-round bilge hull can be found in the Centaur and Laser sailing dinghies.

Comparison of three types of hulls: 1. S-bottom; 2. hard chine; 3. soft chine

S-bottom hulls are sailing boat hulls with a midships transverse half-section shaped like an s. In the s-bottom, the hull has round bilges and merges smoothly with the keel, and there are no sharp corners on the hull sides between the keel centreline and the sheer line. Boats with this hull form may have a long fixed deep keel, or a long shallow fixed keel with a centreboard swing keel inside. Ballast may be internal, external, or a combination. This hull form was most popular in the late 19th and early to mid 20th centuries. Examples of small sailboats that use this s-shape are the Yngling and Randmeer.

== Appendages ==
- Control devices such as a rudder, trim tabs or stabilizing fins may be fitted.
- A keel may be fitted on a hull to increase the transverse stability, directional stability or to create lift.
- Retractable appendages include centreboards and daggerboards.
- A forward protrusion below the waterline is called a bulbous bow. These are fitted on some hulls to reduce the wave making resistance drag and thereby increase fuel efficiency.

== Terms ==
- Baseline is a level reference line from which vertical distances are measured.
- Bow is the front part of the hull.
- Amidships is the middle portion of the vessel in the fore and aft direction.
- Port is the left side of the vessel when facing the bow from on board.
- Starboard is the right side of the vessel when facing the bow from on board.
- Stern is the rear part of the hull.
- Waterline is an imaginary line circumscribing the hull that matches the surface of the water when the hull is not moving.

== Metrics ==
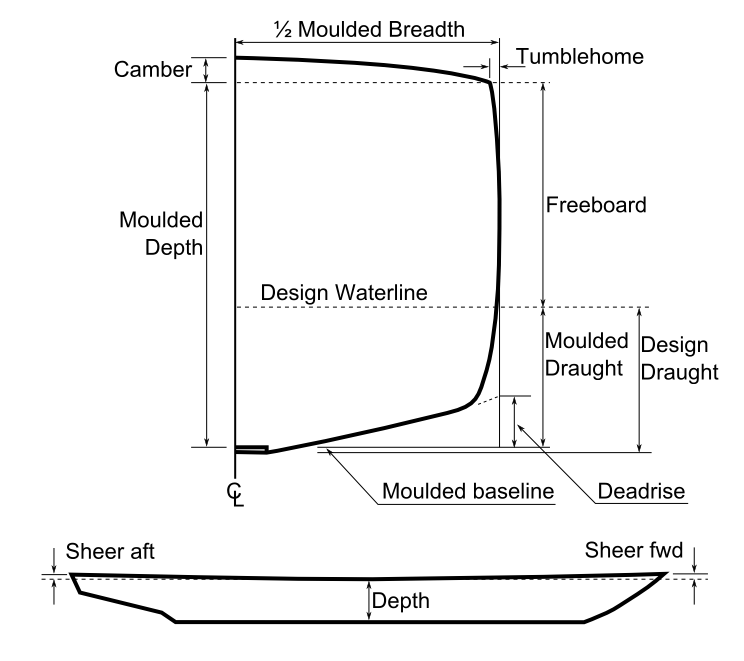
Principal hull measurements

"LWL & LOA"

Hull forms are defined as follows:

Block measures that define the principal dimensions. They are:

- Beam or breadth (B) is the width of the hull. (ex: BWL is the maximum beam at the waterline)
- Draft (d) or (T) is the vertical distance from the bottom of the keel to the waterline.
- Freeboard (FB) is depth plus the height of the keel structure minus draft.
- Length at the waterline (LWL) is the length from the forwardmost point of the waterline measured in profile to the stern-most point of the waterline.
- Length between perpendiculars (LBP or LPP) is the length of the summer load waterline from the stern post to the point where it crosses the stem. (see also p/p)
- Length overall (LOA) is the extreme length from one end to the other.
- Moulded depth (D) is the vertical distance measured from the top of the keel to the underside of the upper deck at side.

Form derivatives that are calculated from the shape and the block measures. They are:

- Displacement (Δ) is the weight of water equivalent to the immersed volume of the hull.
- Longitudinal centre of buoyancy (LCB) is the longitudinal position of the centroid of the displaced volume, often given as the distance from a point of reference (often midships) to the centroid of the static displaced volume. Note that the longitudinal centre of gravity or centre of the weight of the vessel must align with the LCB when the hull is in equilibrium.
- Longitudinal centre of flotation (LCF) is the longitudinal position of the centroid of the waterplane area, usually expressed as longitudinal distance from a point of reference (often midships) to the centre of the area of the static waterplane. This can be visualized as being the area defined by the water's surface and the hull.
- Vertical centre of buoyancy (VCB) is the vertical position of the centroid of displaced volume, generally given as a distance from a point of reference (such as the baseline) to the centre of the static displaced volume.
- Volume (V or ∇) is the volume of water displaced by the hull.

The volume of a ship's hull below the waterline (solid), divided by the volume of a rectangular solid (lines) of the same length, height and width, determine a ship's block coefficient.

Coefficients help compare hull forms as well:

1. Block coefficient (C_{b}) is the volume (V) divided by the L_{WL} × B_{WL} × T_{WL}. If you draw a box around the submerged part of the ship, it is the ratio of the box volume occupied by the ship. It gives a sense of how much of the block defined by the L_{WL}, beam (B) & draft (T) is filled by the hull. Full forms such as oil tankers will have a high C_{b} where fine shapes such as sailboats will have a low C_{b}.
  $$C_b = \frac {V}{L_{WL} \cdot B_{WL} \cdot T_{WL}}$$
2. Midship coefficient (C_{m} or C_{x}) is the cross-sectional area (A_{x}) of the slice at midships (or at the largest section for C_{x}) divided by beam x draft. It displays the ratio of the largest underwater section of the hull to a rectangle of the same overall width and depth as the underwater section of the hull. This defines the fullness of the underbody. A low C_{m} indicates a cut-away mid-section and a high C_{m} indicates a boxy section shape. Sailboats have a cut-away mid-section with low C_{x} whereas cargo vessels have a boxy section with high C_{x} to help increase the C_{b}.
  $$C_m = \frac {A_m}{ B_{WL} \cdot T_{WL}}$$
3. Prismatic coefficient (C_{p}) is the volume (V) divided by L_{WL}x A_{x}. It displays the ratio of the immersed volume of the hull to a volume of a prism with equal length to the ship and cross-sectional area equal to the largest underwater section of the hull (midship section). This is used to evaluate the distribution of the volume of the underbody. A low or fine C_{p} indicates a full mid-section and fine ends, a high or full C_{p} indicates a boat with fuller ends. Planing hulls and other highspeed hulls tend towards a higher C_{p}. Efficient displacement hulls travelling at a low Froude number will tend to have a low C_{p}.
  $$C_p = \frac {V}{L_{WL} \cdot A_m}$$
4. Waterplane coefficient (C_{w}) is the waterplane area divided by L_{WL} x B_{WL}. The waterplane coefficient expresses the fullness of the waterplane, or the ratio of the waterplane area to a rectangle of the same length and width. A low C_{w} figure indicates fine ends and a high C_{w} figure indicates fuller ends. High C_{w} improves stability as well as handling behavior in rough conditions.
  $$C_w = \frac {A_w}{L_{WL} \cdot B_{WL}}$$

Note:
$$C_b = C_{p} \cdot C_{m}$$

== Computer-aided design ==
Use of computer-aided design has superseded paper-based methods of ship design that relied on manual calculations and lines drawing. Since the early 1990s, a variety of commercial and freeware software packages specialized for naval architecture have been developed that provide 3D drafting capabilities combined with calculation modules for hydrostatics and hydrodynamics. These may be referred to as geometric modeling systems for naval architecture.

== See also ==
- Anti-fouling paint – Specialized paint for ship hulls
- Boat – Small watercraft
- Cathedral hull
- Chainplate – Fittings on sailing ships
- Copper sheathing – Ship hull covering
- Displacement–length ratio – Ship measurement
- Double hull – Ship hull design and construction method
- Draft – Depth of a vessel below its waterline
- Froude number – Dimensionless number; ratio of a fluid's flow inertia to the external field
- Hull classification symbol – US naval inventory classification system
- Hull speed – Speed at which the wavelength of a vessel's bow wave is equal to the waterline length
- Lift (force) – Force perpendicular to flow of surrounding fluid
- Monohull – Type of boat or ship having only one hull
- Multihull – Ship or boat with more than one hull
- Naval architecture – Engineering discipline of marine vessels
- Nelson Chequer – Colour scheme adopted by vessels of the British Royal Navy
- Ship measurements – Term or definition relating to measuring a ship's characteristics
- Shipbuilding – Construction of ships and floating vessels
- Submarine – Watercraft capable of independent underwater operation
- Submarine hull – Structural and hydrodynamic component enclosing the vessel
