= Cyprus at the 1996 Summer Olympics =

- IOC code: CYP
- NOC: Cyprus Olympic Committee
- Website: www.olympic.org.cy (in Greek and English)

in Atlanta
- Competitors: 17 (15 men and 2 women) in 5 sports
- Flag bearer: Anninos Marcoullides
- Medals: Gold 0 Silver 0 Bronze 0 Total 0

Summer Olympics appearances (overview)
- 1980; 1984; 1988; 1992; 1996; 2000; 2004; 2008; 2012; 2016; 2020; 2024

Cyprus competed at the 1996 Summer Olympics in Atlanta, United States.

== Results by event ==
=== Athletics ===
Men's 100 metres:

- Anninos Marcoullides
  - Round 1: 10.26
  - Round 2: 10.13
  - Round 3: 10.23
  - Semifinal: 10.36
- Yannis Zisimidis
  - Round 1: 10.32
  - Round 2: 10.47

Men's 200 metres:

- Anninos Marcoullides
  - Final: 20.57 s (→ 11th place)

Men's 400 metres:

- Evripedes Demosthenous
  - Round 1: 46.76 s (→ 43rd place)

Men's 110 metres hurdles:

- Prodromos Katsantonis
  - Round 1: 14.34 (→ 57th place)

Men's 4x100 metres Relay:

- Anninos Marcoullides, Loukas Spyrou, Prodromos Katsantonis, Yannis Zisimidis
  - Round 1: 40.06

Men's Shot Put:

- Elias Louca
  - 18.48m (→ 24th place)
- Michalis Louca
  - 18.23m (→ 28th place)

Women's 200 metres:

- Theodora Kyriakou
  - 23.85 (→ 39th place)

Women's 400 metres:

- Theodora Kyriakou
  - 52.09 (→ 29th place)

=== Swimming ===
Men's 50 metres Freestyle:

- Stavros Michaelides
  - Heat — 23.77 (→ did not advance, 31st place)

Men's 100 metres Freestyle:

- Stavros Michaelides
  - Heat — 52.65 (→ did not advance)

Women's 200 metres Freestyle:

- Marina Zarma
  - Heat — 2:10.85 (→ did not advance)

Women's 400 metres Freestyle:

- Marina Zarma
  - Heat — 4:32.15 (→ did not advance)

=== Shooting ===
Men's Skeet:

- Antonis Andeou — 121 points (→ 9th place)
- Antonis Nicolaides — 119 (→ 21st place)
- Christos Kourtellas — 127 (→ 32nd place)

=== Sailing ===
Men's Double-Handed Dinghy (470)

- Petros Elton and Nikolas Epifaniou — 211 (→ 31st place)

Men's Board (Mistral)

- Dimitrios Lappas — 195 (32nd place)

=== Wrestling ===
Men's Featherweight (Freestyle)

- Arout Parsekian — 10th place
