= Cyprus at the 1992 Summer Olympics =

- IOC code: CYP
- NOC: Cyprus Olympic Committee

in Barcelona
- Competitors: 17 (13 men and 4 women) in 8 sports
- Flag bearer: Marios Hadjiandreou
- Medals: Gold 0 Silver 0 Bronze 0 Total 0

Summer Olympics appearances (overview)
- 1980; 1984; 1988; 1992; 1996; 2000; 2004; 2008; 2012; 2016; 2020; 2024

Cyprus competed at the 1992 Summer Olympics in Barcelona, Spain.

== Competitors ==
The following is the list of number of competitors in the Games.

Sport	Men	Women	Total
Archery	1	0	1
Athletics	3	2	5
Gymnastics	0	2	2
Judo	2	0	2
Sailing	2	0	2
Shooting	2	0	2
Swimming	2	0	2
Wrestling	1	–	1
Total	13	4	17

== Archery ==
Men

Athlete	Event	Ranking round		Round of 32	Round of 16	Quarterfinals	Semifinals	Final / BM	
Athlete	Event	Score	Seed	Opposition Score	Opposition Score	Opposition Score	Opposition Score	Opposition Score	Rank
Simon Simonis	Individual	1117	74	Did not advance					

== Athletics ==
Men
Track and road events

Athlete	Event	Heats		Quarterfinal		Semifinal		Final	
Athlete	Event	Result	Rank	Result	Rank	Result	Rank	Result	Rank
Yiannis Zisimides	100 metres	10.51	17 q	10.65	29	Did not advance			
Yiannis Zisimides	200 metres	21.51	42	Did not advance					

Field events

Athlete	Event	Qualification		Final	
Athlete	Event	Distance	Position	Distance	Position
Photis Stephani	Pole vault	5.20	26	Did not advance	
Marios Hadjiandreou	Triple jump	15.64	39	Did not advance	

Women
Track and road events

Athlete	Event	Heats		Quarterfinal		Semifinal		Final	
Athlete	Event	Result	Rank	Result	Rank	Result	Rank	Result	Rank
Andri Avraam	10,000 metres	34:06.66	35	—N/a				Did not advance	

Field events

Athlete	Event	Qualification		Final	
Athlete	Event	Distance	Position	Distance	Position
Elli Evangelidou	Shot put	14.69	17	Did not advance	

== Gymnastics ==
=== Rhythmic ===
Athlete	Event	Qualification						Final						
Athlete	Event	Hoop	Rope	Clubs	Ball	Total	Rank	Qualification	Hoop	Rope	Clubs	Ball	Total	Rank
Elena Khatzisavva	Individual	8.350	8.450	8.575	8.400	33.775	42	Did not advance						
Anna Kimonos	Individual	8.650	8.800	8.700	8.875	35.025	38	Did not advance						

== Judo ==
Men

Athlete	Event	Round of 64	Round of 32	Round of 16	Quarterfinals	Semifinals	Repechage			Final	
Athlete	Event	Round of 64	Round of 32	Round of 16	Quarterfinals	Semifinals	Round 1	Round 2	Round 3	Final	
Athlete	Event	Opposition Result	Opposition Result	Opposition Result	Opposition Result	Opposition Result	Opposition Result	Opposition Result	Opposition Result	Opposition Result	Rank
Ilias Ioannou	65 kg	Bye	Cantin (CAN); L Ippon	Did not advance							
Khristodoulos Katsinioridis	78 kg	Bye	Bustos (BOL); W Ippon	Wurth (NED); L Ippon	Did not advance						

== Sailing ==
Men

Athlete	Event	Race										Net points	Final rank
Athlete	Event	1	2	3	4	5	6	7	8	9	10	Net points	Final rank
Nikolas Epifaniou; Petros Elton	470	~~44~~	29	34	28	29	19	36	—N/a			175	31

== Shooting ==
Open

Athlete	Event	Qualification		Final	
Athlete	Event	Points	Rank	Points	Rank
Antonis Nikolaidis	Skeet	145	25	Did not advance	
Demetris Lordos	Trap	139	33	Did not advance	

== Swimming ==
Men

Athlete	Event	Heats		Final A/B	
Athlete	Event	Time	Rank	Time	Rank
Stavros Michaelides	50 metre freestyle	23.34	20	Did not advance	
Stavros Michaelides	100 metre freestyle	52.54	44	Did not advance	
Charalambos Panagidis	100 metre breaststroke	1:06.19	42	Did not advance	

== Wrestling ==
Freestyle

Athlete	Event	Group Stage						Final	
Athlete	Event	Opposition Result	Opposition Result	Opposition Result	Opposition Result	Opposition Result	Rank	Opposition Result	Rank
Konstantinos Iliadis	74 kg	Walencik (POL); L 0–8	Revický (TCH); L fall	Did not advance			9	Did not advance	
