= Cyprus at the 2004 Summer Olympics =

- IOC code: CYP
- NOC: Cyprus Olympic Committee
- Website: www.olympic.org.cy (in Greek and English)

in Athens
- Competitors: 20 in 7 sports
- Flag bearer: Georgios Achilleos
- Medals: Gold 0 Silver 0 Bronze 0 Total 0

Summer Olympics appearances (overview)
- 1980; 1984; 1988; 1992; 1996; 2000; 2004; 2008; 2012; 2016; 2020; 2024

Cyprus was represented at the 2004 Summer Olympics in Athens, Greece by the Cyprus Olympic Committee.

In total, 20 athletes including 13 men and seven women represented Cyprus in seven different sports including athletics, cycling, judo, sailing, shooting, swimming and tennis.

== Competitors ==
In total, 20 athletes represented Cyprus at the 2004 Summer Olympics in Athens, Greece across seven different sports.

Sport	Men	Women	Total
Athletics	3	4	7
Cycling	0	1	1
Judo	1	0	1
Sailing	2	1	3
Shooting	2	0	2
Swimming	4	1	5
Tennis	1	0	1
Total	13	7	20

== Athletics ==
In total, seven Cypriot athletes participated in the athletics events – Anna Fitidou in the women's pole vault, Marilia Gregoriou in the women's 200 m, Kyriakos Ioannou in the men's high jump, Prodromos Katsantonis in the men's 100 m, Anninos Marcoullides in the men's 200 m, Androula Sialou in the women's 400 m hurdles and Eleni Teloni in the women's hammer throw.

Men
Track & road events

Athlete	Event	Heat		Quarterfinal		Semifinal		Final	
Athlete	Event	Result	Rank	Result	Rank	Result	Rank	Result	Rank
Prodromos Katsantonis	100 m	10.50	5	Did not advance					
Anninos Marcoullides	200 m	23.94	7	Did not advance					

Field events

Athlete	Event	Qualification		Final	
Athlete	Event	Distance	Position	Distance	Position
Kyriakos Ioannou	High jump	2.25	=18	Did not advance	

Women
Track & road events

Athlete	Event	Heat		Quarterfinal		Semifinal		Final	
Athlete	Event	Result	Rank	Result	Rank	Result	Rank	Result	Rank
Marilia Gregoriou	200 m	23.23	4 Q	23.65	7	Did not advance			
Androula Sialou	400 m hurdles	55.02	4 q	—		1:05.72	8	Did not advance	

Field events

Athlete	Event	Qualification		Final	
Athlete	Event	Distance	Position	Distance	Position
Anna Fitidou	Pole vault	4.15	=24	Did not advance	
Eleni Teloni	Hammer throw	NM	—	Did not advance	

== Cycling ==
In total, one Cypriot athlete participated in the cycling events – Elina Sofocleous in the women's cross-country.

Athlete	Event	Time	Rank
Elina Sofocleous	Women's cross-country	LAP (2 laps)	24

== Judo ==
In total, one Cypriot athlete participated in the judo events – Christodoulos Christodoulides in the men's −73 kg category.

Athlete	Event	Round of 32	Round of 16	Quarterfinals	Semifinals	Repechage 1	Repechage 2	Repechage 3	Final / BM	
Athlete	Event	Opposition Result	Opposition Result	Opposition Result	Opposition Result	Opposition Result	Opposition Result	Opposition Result	Opposition Result	Rank
Christodoulos Christodoulides	Men's −73 kg	Neto (POR); L 0010–0011	Did not advance							

== Sailing ==
In total, three Cypriot athletes participated in the sailing events – Andreas Cariolou in the men's mistral, Gabriella Hadjidamianou in the women's mistral and Haris Papadopoulos in the laser.

Men

Athlete	Event	Race											Net points	Final Rank
Athlete	Event	1	2	3	4	5	6	7	8	9	10	M*	Net points	Final Rank
Andreas Cariolou	Mistral	3	21	6	20	7	18	13	11	~~24~~	16	21	136	13

Women

Athlete	Event	Race											Net points	Final Rank
Athlete	Event	1	2	3	4	5	6	7	8	9	10	M*	Net points	Final Rank
Gabriella Hadjidamianou	Mistral	21	~~DNF~~	18	23	16	19	19	17	22	23	17	195	21

Open

Athlete	Event	Race											Net points	Final Rank
Athlete	Event	1	2	3	4	5	6	7	8	9	10	M*	Net points	Final Rank
Haris Papadopoulos	Laser	25	~~DNS~~	27	9	OCS	16	7	10	30	38	39	244	28

== Shooting ==
In total, two Cypriot athletes participated in the shooting events – Georgios Achilleos and Antonis Nikolaidis in the men's skeet.

Athlete	Event	Qualification		Final	
Athlete	Event	Points	Rank	Points	Rank
Georgios Achilleos	Skeet	121	=9	Did not advance	
Antonis Nikolaidis	Skeet	119	=21	Did not advance	

== Swimming ==
In total, five Cypriot athletes participated in the swimming events – Alexandros Aresti in the men's 100 m freestyle and the men's 200 m freestyle, Georgios Dimitriadis in the men's 200 m individual medley, Kyriakos Dimosthenous in the men's 100 m breaststroke, Chrysanthos Papachrysanthou in the men's 50 m freestyle and Maria Papadopoulou in the women's 100 m butterfly.

Men

Athlete	Event	Heat		Semifinal		Final	
Athlete	Event	Time	Rank	Time	Rank	Time	Rank
Alexandros Aresti	100 m freestyle	51.10	38	Did not advance			
Alexandros Aresti	200 m freestyle	1:53.90	44	Did not advance			
Georgios Dimitriadis	200 m individual medley	2:12.27	48	Did not advance			
Kyriakos Dimosthenous	100 m breaststroke	1:05.54	46	Did not advance			
Chrysanthos Papachrysanthou	50 m freestyle	23.51	45	Did not advance			

Women

Athlete	Event	Heat		Semifinal		Final	
Athlete	Event	Time	Rank	Time	Rank	Time	Rank
Maria Papadopoulou	100 m butterfly	1:02.01	29	Did not advance			

== Tennis ==
In total, one Cypriot athletes participated in the tennis events – Marcos Baghdatis in the men's singles.

Athlete	Event	Round of 64	Round of 32	Round of 16	Quarterfinals	Semifinals	Final / BM	
Athlete	Event	Opposition Score	Opposition Score	Opposition Score	Opposition Score	Opposition Score	Opposition Score	Rank
Marcos Baghdatis	Men's singles	Carraz (FRA); W 5–7, 7–6^{(7–5)}, 7–5	Kiefer (GER); L 2–6, 6–3, 3–6	Did not advance				

== See also ==
- Cyprus at the 2004 Summer Paralympics
- Cyprus at the 2005 Mediterranean Games
