= Cyprus at the 2008 Summer Olympics =

- IOC code: CYP
- NOC: Cyprus Olympic Committee
- Website: www.olympic.org.cy (in Greek and English)

in Beijing
- Competitors: 17 in 6 sports
- Flag bearers: Georgios Achilleos (opening); Andri Eleftheriou (closing)
- Medals: Gold 0 Silver 0 Bronze 0 Total 0

Summer Olympics appearances (overview)
- 1980; 1984; 1988; 1992; 1996; 2000; 2004; 2008; 2012; 2016; 2020; 2024; 2028

Cyprus sent a team to compete at the 2008 Summer Olympics in Beijing, China. Tennis player Marcos Baghdatis was ruled out of the Beijing Olympics tennis tournament due to a wrist injury which brought the country's team to 17 athletes.

== Archery ==
Cyprus had qualified one archer in the women's competition.

| Athlete | Event | Ranking round | | Round of 64 | Round of 32 | Round of 16 | Quarterfinals | Semifinals | Final / BM | |
| Athlete | Event | Score | Seed | Opposition Score | Opposition Score | Opposition Score | Opposition Score | Opposition Score | Opposition Score | Rank |
|---|---|---|---|---|---|---|---|---|---|---|
| Elena Mousikou | Individual | 589 | 56 | Hayakawa (JPN) (9); L 103–112 | Did not advance | | | | | |

== Athletics ==
Key

- Note–Ranks given for track events are within the athlete's heat only
- Q = Qualified for the next round
- q = Qualified for the next round as a fastest loser or, in field events, by position without achieving the qualifying target
- NR = National record
- N/A = Round not applicable for the event
- Bye = Athlete not required to compete in round

Men
Field events

| Athlete | Event | Qualification | | Final | |
| Athlete | Event | Distance | Position | Distance | Position |
|---|---|---|---|---|---|
| Kyriakos Ioannou | High jump | 2.25 | 18 | Did not advance | |

Women
Track & road events

| Athlete | Event | Heat | | Quarterfinal | | Semifinal | | Final | |
| Athlete | Event | Result | Rank | Result | Rank | Result | Rank | Result | Rank |
|---|---|---|---|---|---|---|---|---|---|
| Eleni Artymata | 200 m | 23.58 | 4 Q | 23.77 | 7 | Did not advance | | | |
| Alissa Kallinikou | 400 m | 52.40 | 5 | —N/a | | Did not advance | | | |

Field events

| Athlete | Event | Qualification | | Final | |
| Athlete | Event | Distance | Position | Distance | Position |
|---|---|---|---|---|---|
| Anna Fitídou | Pole vault | 4.00 | 34 | Did not advance | |
| Alexandra Nasta-Tsisiou | Javelin throw | 53.24 | 45 | Did not advance | |
| Paraskevi Theodorou | Hammer throw | 61.00 | 44 | Did not advance | |

== Sailing ==
Men

| Athlete | Event | Race | | | | | | | | | | | Net points | Final rank |
| Athlete | Event | 1 | 2 | 3 | 4 | 5 | 6 | 7 | 8 | 9 | 10 | M* | Net points | Final rank |
|---|---|---|---|---|---|---|---|---|---|---|---|---|---|---|
| Andreas Cariolou | RS:X | 7 | 17 | 14 | 10 | 11 | 17 | 11 | ~~19~~ | 14 | 10 | EL | 111 | 13 |
| Pavlos Kontides | Laser | 8 | 7 | 24 | 14 | 5 | 12 | 14 | 29 | ~~35~~ | CAN | EL | 113 | 13 |

Women

| Athlete | Event | Race | | | | | | | | | | | Net points | Final rank |
| Athlete | Event | 1 | 2 | 3 | 4 | 5 | 6 | 7 | 8 | 9 | 10 | M* | Net points | Final rank |
|---|---|---|---|---|---|---|---|---|---|---|---|---|---|---|
| Gavriella Chatzidamianou | RS:X | 19 | 22 | 23 | 22 | 15 | 23 | ~~25~~ | 22 | 20 | 16 | EL | 182 | 21 |

Open

| Athlete | Event | Race | | | | | | | | | | | Net points | Final rank |
| Athlete | Event | 1 | 2 | 3 | 4 | 5 | 6 | 7 | 8 | 9 | 10 | M* | Net points | Final rank |
|---|---|---|---|---|---|---|---|---|---|---|---|---|---|---|
| Haris Papadopoulos | Finn | 13 | 18 | 21 | 11 | 24 | 11 | 17 | ~~OCS~~ | CAN | CAN | EL | 115 | 22 |

M = Medal race; EL = Eliminated – did not advance into the medal race; CAN = Race cancelled

== Shooting ==
Men

| Athlete | Event | Qualification | | Final | |
| Athlete | Event | Points | Rank | Points | Rank |
|---|---|---|---|---|---|
| Georgios Achilleos | Skeet | 119 | 5 Q | 143 | 5 |
| Antonis Nikolaidis | Skeet | 120 | 4 Q | 144 S/O 2 | 4 |

Women

| Athlete | Event | Qualification | | Final | |
| Athlete | Event | Points | Rank | Points | Rank |
|---|---|---|---|---|---|
| Andri Eleftheriou | Skeet | 67 | 7 | Did not advance | |

== Swimming ==
Women

| Athlete | Event | Heat | | Semifinal | | Final | |
| Athlete | Event | Time | Rank | Time | Rank | Time | Rank |
|---|---|---|---|---|---|---|---|
| Natallia Hadjiloizou | 100 m butterfly | 1:01.80 | 45 | Did not advance | | | |
| Anna Stylianou | 100 m freestyle | 56.38 | 36 | Did not advance | | | |
| Anna Stylianou | 200 m freestyle | 2:00.55 | 27 | Did not advance | | | |

== Weightlifting ==
| Athlete | Event | Snatch | | Clean & Jerk | | Total | Rank |
| Athlete | Event | Result | Rank | Result | Rank | Total | Rank |
|---|---|---|---|---|---|---|---|
| Dimitris Minasidis | Men's −69 kg | 128 | 25 | 155 | 20 | 283 | 20 |
