= Cyprus at the 2020 Summer Olympics =

- IOC code: CYP
- NOC: Cyprus Olympic Committee
- Website: www.olympic.org.cy (in Greek and English)

in Tokyo, Japan July 23, 2021 – August 8, 2021
- Competitors: 15 in 6 sports
- Flag bearers (opening): Andri Eleftheriou; Pavlos Kontides
- Flag bearer (closing): N/A
- Medals: Gold 0 Silver 0 Bronze 0 Total 0

Summer Olympics appearances (overview)
- 1980; 1984; 1988; 1992; 1996; 2000; 2004; 2008; 2012; 2016; 2020; 2024

Cyprus competed at the 2020 Summer Olympics in Tokyo. Originally scheduled to take place from 24 July to 9 August 2020, the Games were postponed to 23 July to 8 August 2021, due to the COVID-19 pandemic. It was the nation's eleventh consecutive appearance at the Summer Olympics.

== Competitors ==
The following is the list of number of competitors in the Games.

Sport	Men	Women	Total
Athletics	2	1	3
Cycling	0	1	1
Gymnastics	1	0	1
Sailing	2	2	4
Shooting	3	1	4
Swimming	1	1	2
Total	9	6	15

== Athletics ==
Cypriot athletes further achieved the entry standards, either by qualifying time or by world ranking, in the following track and field events (up to a maximum of 3 athletes in each event):

Key

- Note–Ranks given for track events are within the athlete's heat only
- Q = Qualified for the next round
- q = Qualified for the next round as a fastest loser or, in field events, by position without achieving the qualifying target
- NR = National record
- N/A = Round not applicable for the event
- Bye = Athlete not required to compete in round

Track & road events

Athlete	Event	Heat		Semifinal		Final	
Athlete	Event	Result	Rank	Result	Rank	Result	Rank
Milan Trajkovic	Men's 110 m hurdles	13.59 SB	4 Q	14.01	8	Did not advance	
Eleni Artymata	Women's 400 m	51.91	5 q	50.80 NR	5	Did not advance	

Field events

Athlete	Event	Qualification		Final	
Athlete	Event	Distance	Position	Distance	Position
Apostolos Parellis	Men's discus throw	62.11 SB	17	Did not advance	

== Cycling ==
=== Road ===
Cyprus entered one rider to compete in the women's Olympic road race, by virtue of her top 100 individual finish (for women) in the UCI World Ranking.

Athlete	Event	Time	Rank
Antri Christoforou	Women's road race	Did not finish	

== Gymnastics ==
=== Artistic ===
Cyprus entered one artistic gymnast into the Olympic competition. Rio 2016 Olympian Marios Georgiou received a spare berth from the men's apparatus events, as one of the seven highest-ranked gymnasts, neither part of the team nor qualified directly through the all-around, at the 2019 World Championships in Stuttgart, Germany.

Men

Athlete	Event	Qualification								Final							
Athlete	Event	Apparatus						Total	Rank	Apparatus						Total	Rank
Athlete	Event	F	PH	R	V	PB	HB	Total	Rank	F	PH	R	V	PB	HB	Total	Rank
Marios Georgiou	All-around	13.466	10.666	12.766	14.100	13.666	14.333	78.997	50	Did not advance							

== Sailing ==
Cypriot sailors qualified one boat in each of the following classes through the 2018 Sailing World Championships, the class-associated Worlds, and the continental regattas.

Athlete	Event	Race													Net points	Final rank
Athlete	Event	1	2	3	4	5	6	7	8	9	10	11	12	M*	Net points	Final rank
Andreas Cariolou	Men's RS:X	18	~~20~~	15	6	9	7	11	8	17	3	10	14	EL	118	12
Pavlos Kontides	Men's Laser	4	7	5	1	20	1	~~RET~~	6	8	24	—N/a		12	88	4
Natasa Lappa	Women's RS:X	24	25	~~26~~	19	17	22	20	20	18	12	22	19	EL	218	21
Marilena Makri	Women's Laser Radial	8	30	26	27	22	31	25	23	~~BFD~~	35	—N/a		EL	227	33

M = Medal race; EL = Eliminated – did not advance into the medal race

== Shooting ==
Cypriot shooters achieved quota places for the following events by virtue of their best finishes at the 2018 ISSF World Championships, the 2019 ISSF World Cup series, European Championships or Games, and European Qualifying Tournament, as long as they obtained a minimum qualifying score (MQS) by May 31, 2020.

Athlete	Event	Qualification		Final	
Athlete	Event	Points	Rank	Points	Rank
Georgios Achilleos	Men's skeet	122	9	Did not advance	
Dimitris Konstantinou	Men's skeet	121	12	Did not advance	
Andreas Makri	Men's trap	117	28	Did not advance	
Andri Eleftheriou	Women's skeet	119	7	Did not advance	

== Swimming ==
Cyprus received a universality invitation from FINA to send two top-ranked swimmers (one per gender) in their respective individual events to the Olympics, based on the FINA Points System of June 28, 2021.

Athlete	Event	Heat		Semifinal		Final	
Athlete	Event	Time	Rank	Time	Rank	Time	Rank
Nikolas Antoniou	Men's 50 m freestyle	23.38	45	Did not advance			
Nikolas Antoniou	Men's 100 m freestyle	50.00	40	Did not advance			
Kalia Antoniou	Women's 50 m freestyle	25.41	=27	Did not advance			
Kalia Antoniou	Women's 100 m freestyle	55.38	29	Did not advance			
