= Cyprus at the 2000 Summer Olympics =

- IOC code: CYP
- NOC: Cyprus Olympic Committee
- Website: www.olympic.org.cy (in Greek and English)

in Sydney
- Competitors: 22
- Flag bearer: Antonis Andeou
- Medals: Gold 0 Silver 0 Bronze 0 Total 0

Summer Olympics appearances (overview)
- 1980; 1984; 1988; 1992; 1996; 2000; 2004; 2008; 2012; 2016; 2020; 2024

Cyprus competed at the 2000 Summer Olympics in Sydney, Australia.

== Results by event ==
=== Athletics ===
Key

- Note–Ranks given for track events are within the athlete's heat only
- Q = Qualified for the next round
- q = Qualified for the next round as a fastest loser or, in field events, by position without achieving the qualifying target
- NM = No mark
- N/A = Round not applicable for the event
- Bye = Athlete not required to compete in round

Men
Track & road events

Athlete	Event	Heat		Quarterfinal		Semifinal		Final	
Athlete	Event	Result	Rank	Result	Rank	Result	Rank	Result	Rank
Anninos Marcoullides	100 m	10.32	6 q	10.48	7	did not advance			
Anninos Marcoullides	200 m	20.83 Q	2	20.71	6	did not advance			
Evripedes Demosthenous	400 m	did not finish		did not advance					
Costas Pochanis	400 m hurdles	51.20	6	did not advance					
Stathis Stasi	3000 m steeplechase	did not finish		—				did not advance	
Prodromos Katsantonis; Anninos Marcoullides; Anthimos Rotos; Yiannis Zisimides	4 × 100 m relay	39.75	5	—		did not advance			

Field events

Athlete	Event	Qualification		Final	
Athlete	Event	Distance	Position	Distance	Position
Photis Stefani	Pole Vault	NM	-	did not advance	

Combined events – Decathlon

Athlete	Event	100 m	LJ	SP	HJ	400 m	110H	DT	PV	JT	1500 m	Final	Rank
Yeorgios Andreou	Result	10,97	6.73	14.24	DNS	-	-	-	-	-	-	DNF	
Yeorgios Andreou	Points	867	750	743	0	-	-	-	-	-	-	DNF	

Women
Field events

Athlete	Event	Qualification		Final	
Athlete	Event	Distance	Position	Distance	Position
Agni Charalambous	High Jump	1.80	33	did not advance	

=== Sailing ===
Two men from Cyprus competed in two Sailing events in the 2000 Olympics.

Athlete	Event	Race											Net points	Rank
Athlete	Event	1	2	3	4	5	6	7	8	9	10	11	Net points	Rank
Demetris Lappas	Mistral	28	16	20	~~32~~	27	~~33~~	31	29	30	19	13	213	30
Aimilios Oikonomidis	Laser	39	39	17	~~40~~	33	~~40~~	34	37	34	33	39	305	40

=== Shooting ===
Athlete	Event	Qualification		Final	
Athlete	Event	Points	Rank	Points	Rank
Antonakis Andreou	Men's skeet	122 (7)	8	did not advance	
Georgios Achilleos	Men's skeet	119	23	did not advance	
Sophia Miaouli	Women's skeet	69	9	did not advance	

== Swimming ==
Men

Athlete	Event	Heat		Semifinal		Final	
Athlete	Event	Time	Rank	Time	Rank	Time	Rank
Stavros Michaelides	50 metre Freestyle	23.05	27	did not advance			
Chrysanthos Papachrysanthou	100 metre Freestyle	52.82	57	did not advance			
Alexandros Aresti	200 metre Freestyle	1:57.54	49	did not advance			
Georgios Dimitriadis	200 metre medley	2:12.76	53	did not advance			

Women

Athlete	Event	Heat		Semifinal		Final	
Athlete	Event	Time	Rank	Time	Rank	Time	Rank
Anna Stylianou	100 metre freestyle	59.08	44	did not advance			
Maria Papadopoulou	100 metre butterfly	1:01.64	32	did not advance			
Natalia Roubina	200 metre butterfly	2:17.01	30	did not advance			
