= Sailing at the 2008 Summer Olympics – Women's RS:X =

Women's RS:X at the Games of the XXIX Olympiad
- Line drawing of the RS-X
- Venue: Qingdao International Sailing Centre
- Dates: First race: 11 August 2008; Last race: 20 August 2008
- Competitors: 27 from 27 nations

Medalists
1st place, gold medalist(s)		Yin Jian	China
2nd place, silver medalist(s)		Alessandra Sensini	Italy
3rd place, bronze medalist(s)		Bryony Shaw	Great Britain

The Women's RS:X was a sailing event on the Sailing at the 2008 Summer Olympics program in Qingdao International Sailing Centre. Eleven races (last one a medal race) were scheduled and completed. 27 sailors, on 27 boards, from 27 nations competed. Ten boards qualified for the medal race.

== Race schedule ==
●	Practice race	●	Race on Yellow	●	Race on Red	●	Medal race on Yellow

Date	August																	
Date	7 Thu	8 Fri	9 Sat	10 Sun	11 Mon	12 Tue	13 Wed	14 Thu	15 Fri	16 Sat	17 Sun	18 Mon	19 Tue	20 Wed	21 Thu	22 Fri	23 Sat	24 Sun
Women's RS:X				PR	S1,2	S3,4	Res	No wind	S5	No wind	S6,7	S7,8	S9	MR				

== Course areas and course configurations ==
For the RS:X course areas A (Yellow) and B (Red) were used. The location (36°1'26"’N, 120°26'52"E) points to the center of the 0.6nm radius Yellow course area and the location (36°2'21"N, 120°25'32"E) points to the center of the 0.6nm radius Red course area. The target time for the course was about 30–35 minutes for the races and 20 minutes for the medal race. The race management could choose from several course configurations.

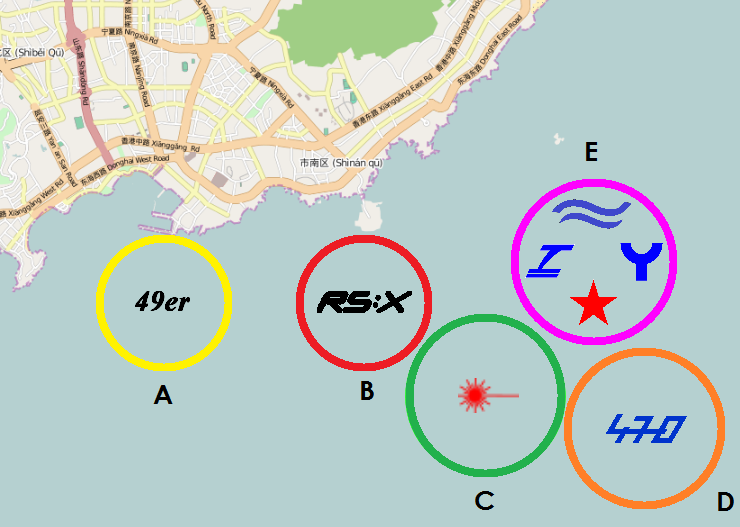
Course Areas

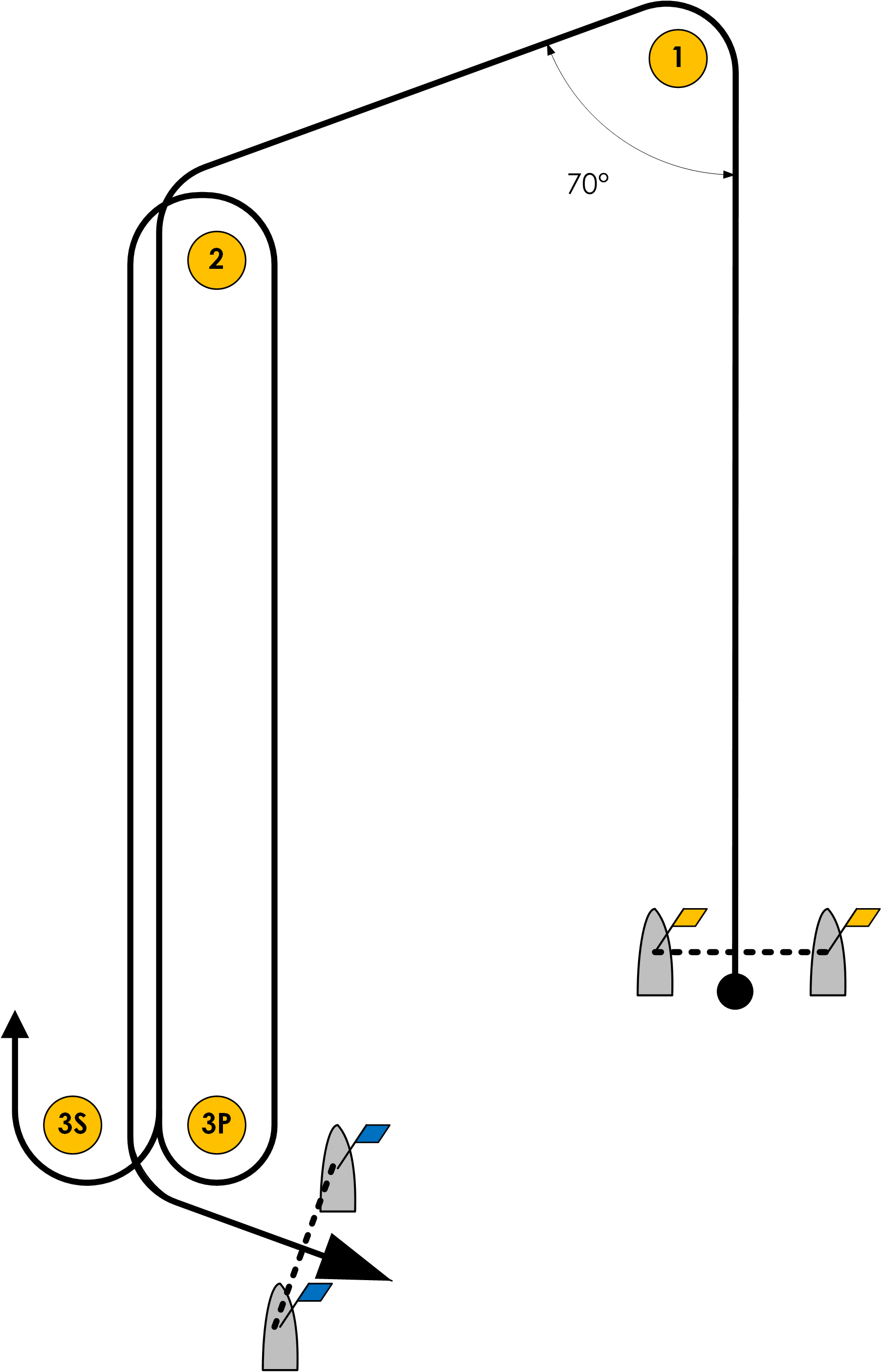
70° Trapezoid Outer Course (O)

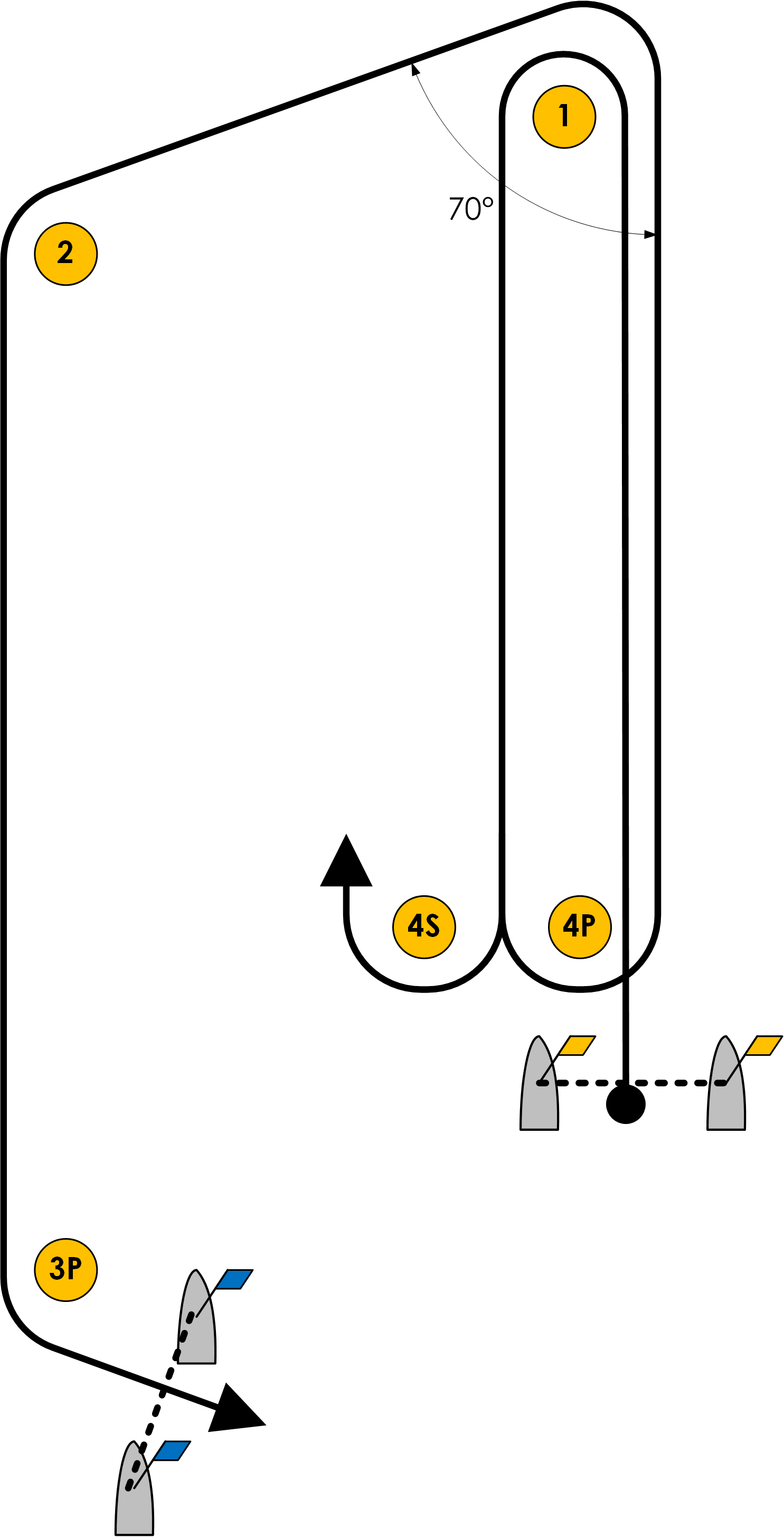
70° Trapezoid Inner Course (I)

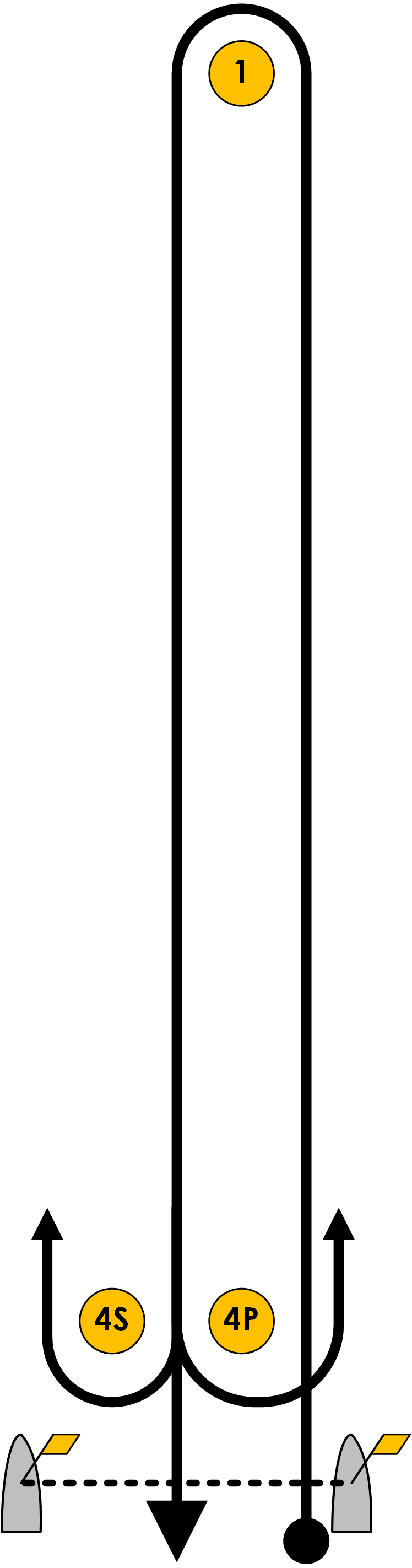
Windward - Leeward Course (W)

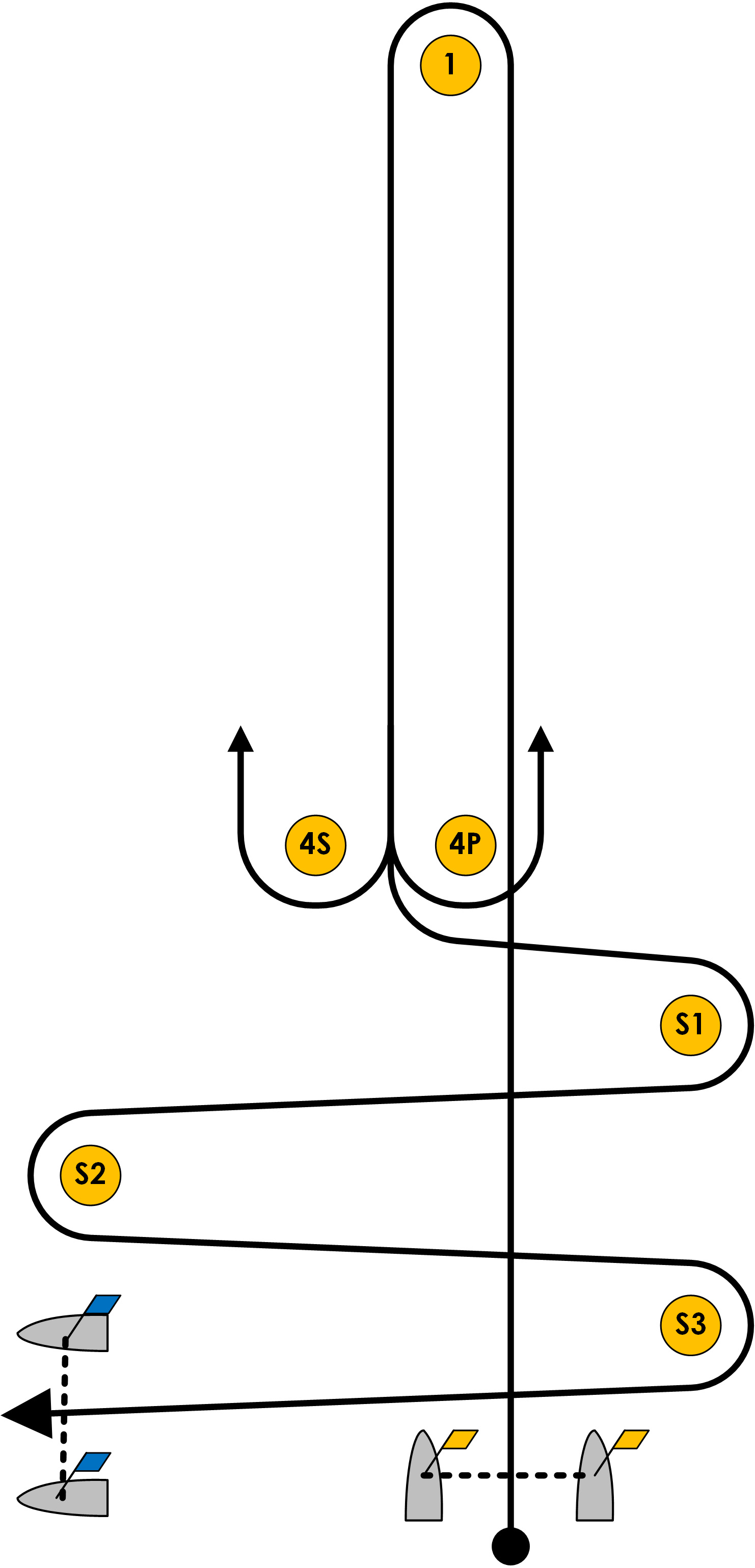
Windward - Leeward Course (WS)

=== Outer courses ===
- O1: START – 1 – 2 – 3s/3p – 2 – 3p – FINISH
- O2: START – 1 – 2 – 3s/3p – 2 – 3s/3p – 2 – 3p – FINISH
- O3: START – 1 – 2 – 3s/3p – 2 – 3s/3p – 2 – 3s/3p – 2 – 3p – FINISH

=== Inner courses ===
- I1: START – 1 – 4s/4p – 1 – 2 – 3p – FINISH
- I2: START – 1 – 4s/4p – 1 – 4s/4p – 1 – 2 – 3p – FINISH
- I3: START – 1 – 4s/4p – 1 – 4s/4p – 1 – 4s/4p – 1 – 2 – 3p – FINISH

=== Windward-Leeward courses ===
- W2: START – 1 – 4s/4p – 1 – FINISH
- W3: START – 1 – 4s/4p – 1 – 4s/4p – 1 – FINISH
- W4: START – 1 – 4s/4p – 1 – 4s/4p – 1 – 4s/4p – 1 – FINISH

=== Windward-Leeward Slalom courses ===
- WS1: START – 1 – 4s/4p – S1 – S2 – S3 – FINISH
- WS2: START – 1 – 4s/4p – 1 – 4s/4p – S1 – S2 – S3 – FINISH
- WS3: START – 1 – 4s/4p – 1 – 4s/4p – 1 – 4s/4p – S1 – S2 – S3 – FINISH

== Weather conditions ==
In the lead up to the Olympics many questioned the choice of Qingdao as a venue with very little predicted wind. During the races the wind was pretty light and quite unpredictable. Due to lack of wind (< 1.6 knots) two racing days had to be postponed.

== Final results ==
Rank	Country	Helmsman	Race 1		Race 2		Race 3		Race 4		Race 5		Race 6		Race 7		Race 8		Race 9		Race 10		Medalrace		Total	Total – discard
Rank	Country	Helmsman	Pos.	Pts.	Pos.	Pts.	Pos.	Pts.	Pos.	Pts.	Pos.	Pts.	Pos.	Pts.	Pos.	Pts.	Pos.	Pts.	Pos.	Pts.	Pos.	Pts.	Pos.	Pts.	Total	Total – discard
1st place, gold medalist(s)	China	Yin Jian	1	1.0	1	1.0	1	1.0	3	3.0	3	3.0	~~13~~	~~13.0~~	7	7.0	8	8.0	8	8.0	1	1.0	3	6.0	52.0	39.0
2nd place, silver medalist(s)	Italy	Alessandra Sensini	6	6.0	2	2.0	9	9.0	1	1.0	~~DSQ~~	~~28.0~~	3	3.0	2	2.0	2	2.0	5	5.0	8	8.0	1	2.0	68.0	40.0
3rd place, bronze medalist(s)	Great Britain	Bryony Shaw	4	4.0	3	3.0	11	11.0	6	6.0	~~OCS~~	~~28.0~~	6	6.0	5	5.0	3	3.0	1	1.0	2	2.0	2	4.0	73.0	45.0
4	Spain	Marina Alabau	3	3.0	5	5.0	5	5.0	2	2.0	5	5.0	~~11~~	~~11.0~~	8	8.0	5	5.0	4	4.0	9	9.0	4	8.0	65.0	54.0
5	Australia	Jessica Crisp	2	2.0	4	4.0	3	3.0	8	8.0	1	1.0	8	8.0	9	9.0	~~14~~	~~14.0~~	6	6.0	5	5.0	10	20.0	80.0	66.0
6	New Zealand	Barbara Kendall	12	12.0	7	7.0	12	12.0	4	4.0	2	2.0	4	4.0	3	3.0	6	6.0	13	13.0	~~21~~	~~21.0~~	6	12.0	96.0	75.0
7	Poland	Zofia Noceti-Klepacka	~~17~~	~~17.0~~	16	16.0	17	17.0	5	5.0	4	4.0	2	2.0	1	1.0	1	1.0	3	3.0	17	17.0	8	16.0	99.0	82.0
8	Ukraine	Olha Maslivets	5	5.0	6	6.0	~~14~~	~~14.0~~	11	11.0	10	10.0	1	1.0	4	4.0	12	12.0	12	12.0	12	12.0	5	10.0	97.0	83.0
9	Hong Kong	Chan Wai Kei	10	10.0	10	10.0	6	6.0	13	13.0	7	7.0	12	12.0	6	6.0	7	7.0	~~14~~	~~14.0~~	4	4.0	9	18.0	107.0	93.0
10	Israel	Maayan Davidovich	13	13.0	9	9.0	~~20~~	~~20.0~~	9	9.0	13	13.0	14	14.0	16	16.0	4	4.0	9	9.0	10	10.0	7	14.0	131.0	111.0
11	France	Faustine Merret	8	8.0	~~DSQ~~	~~28.0~~	10	10.0	7	7.0	11	11.0	19	19.0	17	17.0	18	18.0	7	7.0	3	3.0	-	-	128.0	100.0
12	Bulgaria	Irina Konstantinova	~~18~~	~~18.0~~	8	8.0	8	8.0	15	15.0	18	18.0	17	17.0	10	10.0	10	10.0	2	2.0	13	13.0	-	-	119.0	101.0
13	Japan	Yasuko Kosuge	9	9.0	12	12.0	4	4.0	17	17.0	14	14.0	~~18~~	~~18.0~~	18	18.0	11	11.0	10	10.0	7	7.0	-	-	120.0	102.0
14	Norway	Jannicke Stålstrøm	7	7.0	~~DSQ~~	~~28.0~~	2	2.0	12	12.0	9	9.0	10	10.0	15	15.0	13	13.0	21	21.0	18	18.0	-	-	135.0	107.0
15	Greece	Athina Frai	15	15.0	15	15.0	16	16.0	10	10.0	~~19~~	~~19.0~~	5	5.0	11	11.0	9	9.0	15	15.0	11	11.0	-	-	126.0	107.0
16	Finland	Tuuli Petäjä	14	14.0	11	11.0	7	7.0	~~16~~	~~16.0~~	16	16.0	16	16.0	12	12.0	16	16.0	11	11.0	14	14.0	-	-	133.0	117.0
17	Canada	Nikola Girke	11	11.0	14	14.0	13	13.0	14	14.0	12	12.0	15	15.0	13	13.0	~~DNF~~	~~28.0~~	18	18.0	15	15.0	-	-	153.0	125.0
18	Brazil	Patrícia Freitas	20	20.0	13	13.0	15	15.0	~~23~~	~~23.0~~	6	6.0	7	7.0	21	21.0	17	17.0	16	16.0	20	20.0	-	-	158.0	135.0
19	Denmark	Bettina Honoré	21	21.0	18	18.0	21	21.0	18	18.0	20	20.0	9	9.0	14	14.0	15	15.0	~~22~~	~~22.0~~	6	6.0	-	-	164.0	142.0
20	Thailand	Napalai Tansai	16	16.0	17	17.0	18	18.0	~~24~~	~~24.0~~	8	8.0	22	22.0	19	19.0	23	23.0	23	23.0	23	23.0	-	-	193.0	169.0
21	Cyprus	Gavriella Chatzidamianou	19	19.0	22	22.0	23	23.0	22	22.0	15	15.0	23	23.0	~~25~~	~~25.0~~	22	22.0	20	20.0	16	16.0	-	-	207.0	182.0
22	Hungary	Diána Detre	22	22.0	20	20.0	19	19.0	21	21.0	22	22.0	25	25.0	~~26~~	~~26.0~~	20	20.0	17	17.0	19	19.0	-	-	211.0	185.0
23	Mexico	Demita Vega	23	23.0	21	21.0	25	25.0	25	25.0	17	17.0	21	21.0	20	20.0	19	19.0	19	19.0	~~26~~	~~26.0~~	-	-	216.0	190.0
24	Russia	Tatiana Bazyuk	24	24.0	23	23.0	24	24.0	19	19.0	21	21.0	20	20.0	22	22.0	21	21.0	~~25~~	~~25.0~~	24	24.0	-	-	223.0	198.0
25	Argentina	Florencia Gutiérrez	27	27.0	19	19.0	27	27.0	20	20.0	23	23.0	26	26.0	23	23.0	~~DNF~~	~~28.0~~	24	24.0	27	27.0	-	-	244.0	216.0
26	United States	Nancy Rios	25	25.0	24	24.0	22	22.0	26	26.0	24	24.0	27	27.0	~~DNF~~	~~28.0~~	DNF	28.0	26	26.0	22	22.0	-	-	252.0	224.0
27	Turkey	Sedef Köktentürk	26	26.0	25	25.0	26	26.0	27	27.0	~~OCS~~	~~28.0~~	24	24.0	24	24.0	DNF	28.0	27	27.0	25	25.0	-	-	260.0	232.0

Legend: – Qualified for next phase; DNF – Did not finish; DSQ – Disqualified; OCS – On the course side of the starting line;
Discard is crossed out and does not count for the overall result.

== Daily standings ==
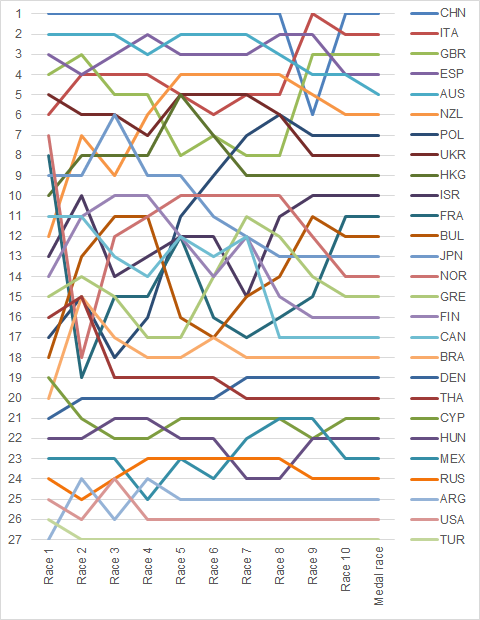
Graph showing the daily standings in the Women's RS:X during the 2008 Summer Olympics
