= Sergey Aksyutin =

Russian sport shooter

Personal information
- Full name: Sergey Vladimirovich Aksyutin
- Nationality: Russia
- Born: 1 January 1964 (age 62) Orenburg, Russian SFSR, Soviet Union
- Height: 1.90 m (6 ft 3 in)
- Weight: 100 kg (220 lb)

Sport
- Sport: Shooting
- Event: Skeet (SK125)
- Club: SK Sibakademstroy
- Coached by: Yury Kashuba

Sergey Vladimirovich Aksyutin (Russian: Сергей Владимирович Аксютин; born 1 January 1964 in Orenburg) is a Russian sport shooter. He was selected to compete for Russia at the 2004 Summer Olympics and eventually claimed his only individual medal with a bronze in skeet shooting at the 2006 ISSF World Cup meet in Qingyuan, China. A full-fledged resident athlete of the Shooting Union of Russia, Aksyutin trained throughout his sporting career under head coach Yury Kashuba at SK Sibakademstroy in Novosibirsk.

Aksyutin qualified for the Russian shooting team, as a 40-year-old, in the men's skeet at the 2004 Summer Olympics in Athens. He had registered a minimum qualifying score of 120 to join with his fellow shooter Valeriy Shomin, and fill in the second Olympic quota (previously reserved by Oleg Tishin at the ISSF World Cup meet in Perth, Australia) for Russia, following his ninth-place finish at the World Championships in Nicosia, Cyprus less than a year earlier. Aksyutin had shared an identical score of 120 birds with five other shooters, including his teammate Shomin, for fifteenth place, just two shots away from a final cutoff.
