= Nancy Rios =

American windsurfer (born 1988)

Personal information
- Full name: Nancy Damian Rios
- Nationality: United States
- Born: April 26, 1988 (age 38) Orange County, California, U.S.
- Height: 5 ft 2 in (1.57 m)
- Weight: 115 lb (52 kg)

Sailing career
- Sport: Sailing
- Club: Banana River Windsurfing Resort
- Coached by: Brandon Sebald
- Class: Sailboard

Nancy Damian Rios (born April 26, 1988) is an American former windsurfer, who specialized in the RS:X class. She finished fifth in her sporting discipline at the 2007 Pan American Games in Rio de Janeiro, and was eventually named the country's top female windsurfer for the 2008 Summer Olympics, finishing a lowly twenty-sixth place. A member of the sailing roster at Banana River Windsurfing Resort in Cocoa Beach, Florida, Rios trained under the tutelage of her personal coach Brandon Sebald.

Rios competed for the U.S. sailing squad in the inaugural women's RS:X class at the 2008 Summer Olympics in Beijing. Before securing one of the seven berths available at the Worlds in late January 2008, she topped the selection criteria in a three-way controversial battle against Karen Marriott and Farrah Hall at the U.S. Team Trials in Long Beach, California. Following the last of the 16-race regatta, Rios protested that her collision with Marriott and Hall ripped her sail and slowed her down towards the near end of the fleet. US Sailing favored Rio's appeal for redress, raised her cumulative score, and awarded her a spot on the team. During her maiden Games, Rios clearly struggled to catch a large fleet of windsurfers from behind under breezy conditions with marks lower than the top 20 and an unanticipated eighth-leg exit at the end of ten-race series, sitting her steadily in twenty-sixth overall with a net grade of 224. Moreover, Rios' cumulative score spared her from the bottom of the field by a slight, eight-point edge over Turkey's Sedef Köktentürk.
