= Cyprus at the 2012 Summer Olympics =

- IOC code: CYP
- NOC: Cyprus Olympic Committee
- Website: www.olympic.org.cy (in Greek and English)

in London
- Competitors: 13 in 7 sports
- Flag bearers: Marcos Baghdatis (opening); Chrystalleni Trikomiti (closing)
- Medals Ranked 69th: Gold 0 Silver 1 Bronze 0 Total 1

Summer Olympics appearances (overview)
- 1980; 1984; 1988; 1992; 1996; 2000; 2004; 2008; 2012; 2016; 2020; 2024

Republic of Cyprus competed at the 2012 Summer Olympics in London, United Kingdom from 27 July to 12 August 2012. This was the nation's ninth consecutive appearance at the Olympics.

Cyprus Olympic Committee sent the nation's smallest team ever to the Games since 1988. A total of 13 athletes, 9 men and 4 women, competed in 7 sports. Skeet shooter Georgios Achilleos became the first Cypriot athlete to participate in four Olympic games. Professional tennis player and one-time Australian Open finalist Marcos Baghdatis, who did not compete in Beijing because of injury, was the nation's flag bearer at the opening ceremony.

Cyprus left London with its first ever Olympic medal by sailor Pavlos Kontides, who won silver in the men's Laser event.

== Medalists ==
Medal	Name	Sport	Event	Date
Silver	Pavlos Kontides	Sailing	Laser	6 August

== Athletics ==
Cypriot athletes have so far achieved qualifying standards in the following athletics events (up to a maximum of 3 athletes in each event at the 'A' Standard, and 1 at the 'B' Standard):

Key

- Note–Ranks given for track events are within the athlete's heat only
- Q = Qualified for the next round
- q = Qualified for the next round as a fastest loser or, in field events, by position without achieving the qualifying target
- NR = National record
- N/A = Round not applicable for the event
- Bye = Athlete not required to compete in round

Men

Athlete	Event	Qualification		Final	
Athlete	Event	Distance	Position	Distance	Position
Kyriakos Ioannou	High jump	2.26	12 q	2.20	13
Apostolos Parellis	Discus throw	63.48	13	Did not advance	
Constantinos Stathelakos	Hammer throw	69.65	33	Did not advance	

Women

Athlete	Event	Heat		Semifinal		Final	
Athlete	Event	Result	Rank	Result	Rank	Result	Rank
Eleni Artymata	200 m	23.09	6 q	22.92	8	Did not advance	

== Cycling ==
Cyprus has qualified the following cyclists for the Games.

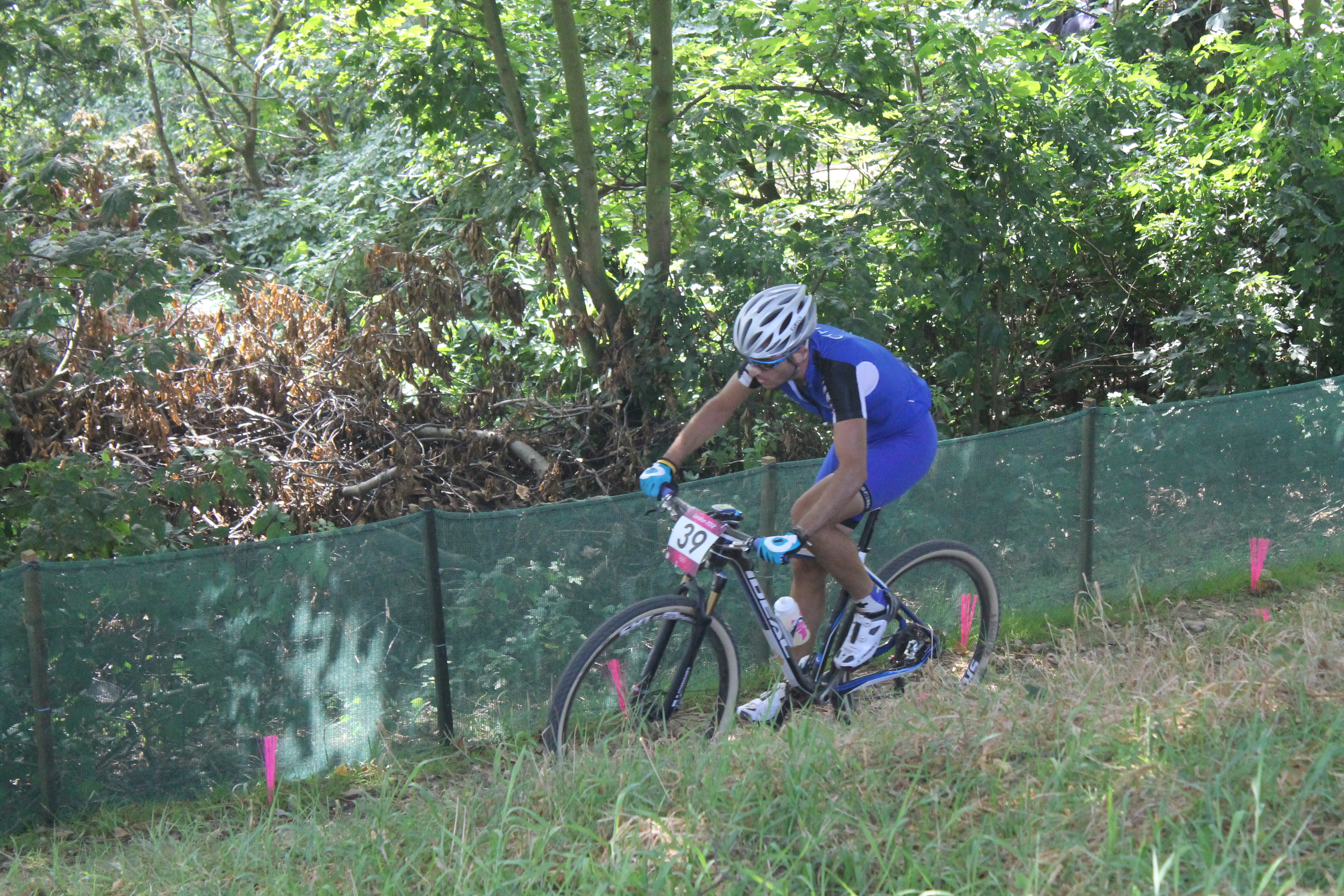
Marios Athanasiadis in men's cross-country race

=== Mountain biking ===
Athlete	Event	Time	Rank
Marios Athanasiadis	Men's cross-country	1:43:25	40

== Gymnastics ==
=== Rhythmic ===
Athlete	Event	Qualification						Final					
Athlete	Event	Hoop	Ball	Clubs	Ribbon	Total	Rank	Hoop	Ball	Clubs	Ribbon	Total	Rank
Chrystalleni Trikomiti	All-around	26.255	26.250	26.380	26.665	104.675	19	Did not advance					

== Sailing ==
Cyprus has qualified 1 boat for each of the following events

Men

Athlete	Event	Race											Net points	Final Rank
Athlete	Event	1	2	3	4	5	6	7	8	9	10	M*	Net points	Final Rank
Andreas Carioulou	RS:X	13	26	10	27	11	~~30~~	16	12	12	23	EL	150	17
Pavlos Kontides	Laser	9	4	1	1	2	4	~~12~~	7	7	4	10	59	2nd place, silver medalist(s)

M = Medal race; EL = Eliminated – did not advance into the medal race;

== Shooting ==
Cyprus has qualified for three quota places in shooting;

Men

Athlete	Event	Qualification		Final	
Athlete	Event	Points	Rank	Points	Rank
Georgios Achilleos	Skeet	118	11	Did not advance	
Antonakis Andreou	Skeet	115	22	Did not advance	

Women

Athlete	Event	Qualification		Final	
Athlete	Event	Points	Rank	Points	Rank
Panayiota Andreou	Skeet	57	16	Did not advance	

== Swimming ==
Swimmers have so far achieved qualifying standards in the following events (up to a maximum of 2 swimmers in each event at the Olympic Qualifying Time (OQT), and potentially 1 at the Olympic Selection Time (OST)):

Women

Athlete	Event	Heat		Semifinal		Final	
Athlete	Event	Time	Rank	Time	Rank	Time	Rank
Anna Stylianou	200 m freestyle	2:01.87	27	Did not advance			

== Tennis ==
Athlete	Event	Round of 64	Round of 32	Round of 16	Quarterfinals	Semifinals	Final / BM	
Athlete	Event	Opposition Score	Opposition Score	Opposition Score	Opposition Score	Opposition Score	Opposition Score	Rank
Marcos Baghdatis	Men's singles	Soeda (JPN); W 6–7^{(6–8)}, 7–6^{(7–5)}, 6–2	Gasquet (FRA); W 6–4, 6–4	A Murray (GBR); L 6–4, 1–6, 4–6	Did not advance			
