= Cyprus at the 2016 Summer Olympics =

- IOC code: CYP
- NOC: Cyprus Olympic Committee
- Website: www.olympic.org.cy (in Greek and English)

in Rio de Janeiro
- Competitors: 16 in 7 sports
- Flag bearer: Pavlos Kontides
- Medals: Gold 0 Silver 0 Bronze 0 Total 0

Summer Olympics appearances (overview)
- 1980; 1984; 1988; 1992; 1996; 2000; 2004; 2008; 2012; 2016; 2020; 2024

Cyprus competed at the 2016 Summer Olympics in Rio de Janeiro, Brazil, from 5 to 21 August 2016. This was the nation's tenth consecutive appearance at the Summer Olympics.

Cyprus Olympic Committee sent a team of 16 athletes, 10 men and 6 women, to compete in seven different sports at the Games. The nation's full roster in Rio de Janeiro was slightly larger by three athletes than those sent to London 2012. Among the sporting events represented by the nation's athletes, Cyprus made its Olympic debut in artistic gymnastics and women's road cycling.

The Cypriot delegation featured six returning Olympians, with only four of them having participated in more than two editions of the Olympic Games, including high jumper Kyriakos Ioannou, sprinter Eleni Artymata, 33-year-old windsurfer Andreas Cariolou (the oldest and most experienced competitor of the team), and Laser sailor Pavlos Kontides, who won a silver medal in London four years earlier. The nation's first ever Olympic medalist, and one of the potential frontrunners for gold in the Laser class at his third Games, Kontides was selected to lead the Cypriot team as the flag bearer in the opening ceremony.

Unlike the previous Olympics, Cyprus failed to earn a single medal in Rio de Janeiro. Kontides, Ioannou, and Serbian-born hurdler Milan Trajkovic came close to adding another medal for Cyprus at these Games, but finished seventh in the finals of their respective sporting events.

== Athletics ==
Cypriot athletes have so far achieved qualifying standards in the following athletics events (up to a maximum of 3 athletes in each event):

Key

- Note–Ranks given for track events are within the athlete's heat only
- Q = Qualified for the next round
- q = Qualified for the next round as a fastest loser or, in field events, by position without achieving the qualifying target
- NR = National record
- N/A = Round not applicable for the event
- Bye = Athlete not required to compete in round
- NM = No mark

Track & road events

Athlete	Event	Heat		Quarterfinal		Semifinal		Final	
Athlete	Event	Result	Rank	Result	Rank	Result	Rank	Result	Rank
Milan Trajkovic	Men's 110 m hurdles	13.59	3 Q	—		13.31	2 Q	13.41	7
Eleni Artymata	Women's 200 m	23.27	5	—		Did not advance			
Ramona Papaioannou	Women's 100 m	Bye		11.61	6	Did not advance			
Ramona Papaioannou	Women's 200 m	23.10 PB	4	—		Did not advance			

Field events

Athlete	Event	Qualification		Final	
Athlete	Event	Distance	Position	Distance	Position
Dimitrios Chondrokoukis	Men's high jump	2.26	=12 q	2.25	12
Kyriakos Ioannou	Men's high jump	2.26	=12 q	2.29	=7
Apostolos Parellis	Men's discus throw	63.35	8 q	63.72	8
Leontia Kallenou	Women's high jump	1.80 SB	=32	Did not advance	

== Cycling ==
=== Road ===
Cyprus has qualified one rider in the women's Olympic road race by virtue of her top 100 individual placement in the 2016 UCI World Rankings.

Athlete	Event	Time	Rank
Antri Christoforou	Women's road race	OTL	

== Gymnastics ==
=== Artistic ===
Cyprus has entered one artistic gymnast for the first time into the Olympic competition. Marios Georgiou had claimed his Olympic spot in the men's apparatus and all-around events at the Olympic Test Event in Rio de Janeiro.

Men

Athlete	Event	Qualification								Final							
Athlete	Event	Apparatus						Total	Rank	Apparatus						Total	Rank
Athlete	Event	F	PH	R	V	PB	HB	Total	Rank	F	PH	R	V	PB	HB	Total	Rank
Marios Georgiou	All-around	13.566	14.066	13.366	14.733	14.858	14.700	85.289	26 Q	0.000	0.000	0.000	12.833	12.466	9.433	34.732	23

== Sailing ==
Cypriot sailors have qualified one boat in each of the following classes through the 2014 ISAF Sailing World Championships, the individual fleet Worlds, and European qualifying regattas.

Athlete	Event	Race													Net points	Final rank
Athlete	Event	1	2	3	4	5	6	7	8	9	10	11	12	M*	Net points	Final rank
Andreas Cariolou	Men's RS:X	12	12	16	23	10	6	18	~~27~~	23	22	19	20	EL	181	19
Pavlos Kontides	Men's Laser	7	~~31~~	1	14	25	6	8	14	9	8	—		12	104	7

M = Medal race; EL = Eliminated – did not advance into the medal race

== Shooting ==
Cyprus has qualified one shooter each in the men's and women's skeet by virtue of their best finishes at the 2015 ISSF World Cup series, and the World Shotgun Championships, as long as they obtained a minimum qualifying score (MQS) by 31 March 2016.

Athlete	Event	Qualification		Semifinal		Final	
Athlete	Event	Points	Rank	Points	Rank	Points	Rank
Andreas Chasikos	Men's skeet	118	16	Did not advance			
Andri Eleftheriou	Women's skeet	64	15	Did not advance			

Qualification Legend: Q = Qualify for the next round; q = Qualify for the bronze medal (shotgun)

== Swimming ==
Cyprus has received a Universality invitation from FINA to send two swimmers (one male and one female) to the Olympics.

Athlete	Event	Heat		Semifinal		Final	
Athlete	Event	Time	Rank	Time	Rank	Time	Rank
Iacovos Hadjiconstantinou	Men's 400 m freestyle	4:03.53	47	—		Did not advance	
Sotiria Neofytou	Women's 100 m butterfly	1:02.91	37	Did not advance			

== Weightlifting ==
Cyprus has qualified one male weightlifter for the Olympics by virtue of his top 15 individual finish, among those who had not secured any quota places through the World or European Championships, in the IWF World Rankings as of 20 June 2016. The place was awarded to Greek-born Antonis Martasidis in the men's middleweight division (85 kg).

On 25 July 2016, Martasidis was ejected from the Games, after testing positive for the banned substance.

Athlete	Event	Snatch		Clean & Jerk		Total	Rank
Athlete	Event	Result	Rank	Result	Rank	Total	Rank
Antonis Martasidis	Men's −85 kg	Disqualified due to doping					
