= Demita Vega =

Mexican windsurfer

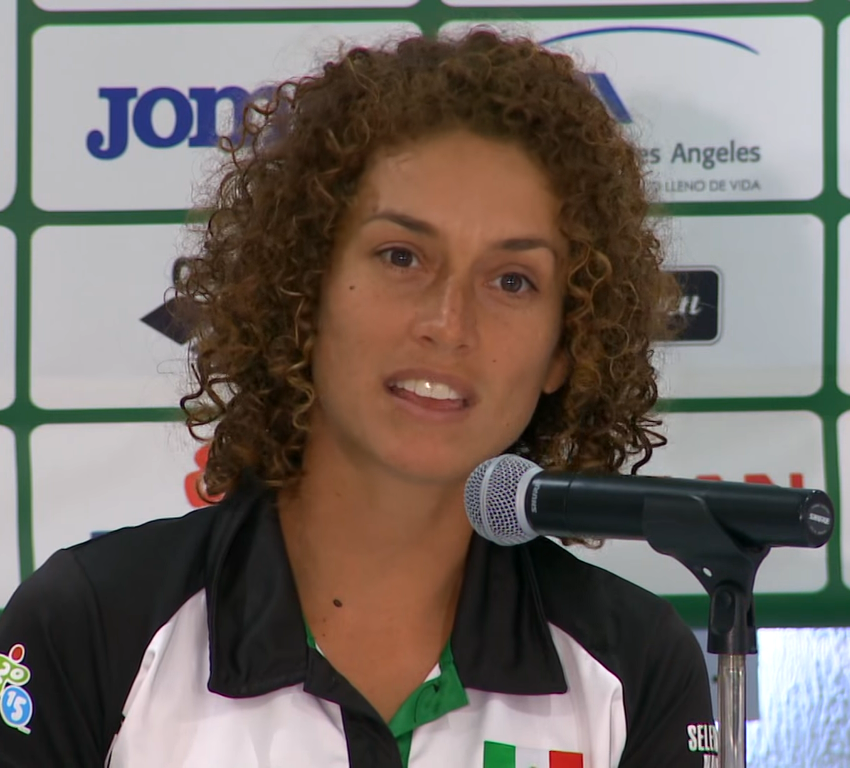
- Vega in 2016

Personal information
- Full name: Demita Vega de Lille
- Nationality: Mexico
- Born: 21 July 1983 (age 42) Mérida, Yucatán, Mexico
- Height: 1.70 m (5 ft 7 in)
- Weight: 57 kg (126 lb)

Sailing career
- Sport: Sailing
- Coached by: Adrien Gaillard
- Class: Sailboard
Medal record
Sailing
Representing Mexico
Pan American Games
Silver medal – second place	2011 Guadalajara	Women's RS:X
Silver medal – second place	2015 Toronto	Women's RS:X
Bronze medal – third place	2023 Santiago	Women's IQFoil

Demita Vega de Lille (Note: In this Spanish name, the first or paternal surname is Vega and the second or maternal family name is De Lille.) (born 21 July 1983 in Mérida, Yucatán) is a Mexican windsurfer, who specialized in Neil Pryde RS:X class. She represented her nation Mexico at the 2008 Summer Olympics, and later picked up a silver medal in windsurfing at the 2011 Pan American Games in Guadalajara. As of September 2014, Vega is ranked seventh in the world for the sailboard class by the International Sailing Federation, following her successes at the North American and ISAF World Championships.

Vega qualified for the Mexican squad in the newly introduced RS:X class at the 2008 Summer Olympics in Beijing by placing second and receiving a berth from the World Championships in Auckland, New Zealand. She posted a net score of 190 points to claim a creditable 23rd spot in a fleet against 26 other windsurfers.

At the 2011 Pan American Games in Guadalajara, Vega sailed smoothly in all the races with a remarkable grade of 28 to settle only for the silver medal in the women's sailboard class, falling behind Brazil's Patrícia Freitas by a 16-point gap. She also sought to compete for the 2012 Summer Olympics in London, but failed to fulfill her requirements with the Mexican Sailing Federation with a prospect to grant a place for her in the same class.

Demita Vega won the silver medal at the 2015 Toronto Panam and Parapan Am Games.

Two years later, at the 2014 ISAF Sailing World Championships in Santander, Spain, Vega picked up a twenty-fourth spot in the women's RS:X class, and is expected to compete for the Mexican sailing squad on her second Games in Rio de Janeiro.

Vega's also competed at the 2020 Summer Olympics.
