= Cyprus at the 1988 Summer Olympics =

- IOC code: CYP
- NOC: Cyprus Olympic Committee

in Seoul
- Competitors: 9 in 4 sports
- Flag bearer: Mikhalakis Tymbios
- Medals: Gold 0 Silver 0 Bronze 0 Total 0

Summer Olympics appearances (overview)
- 1980; 1984; 1988; 1992; 1996; 2000; 2004; 2008; 2012; 2016; 2020; 2024

Cyprus competed at the 1988 Summer Olympics in Seoul, South Korea.

== Competitors ==
The following is the list of number of competitors in the Games.

Sport	Men	Women	Total
Athletics	2	2	4
Judo	2	–	2
Sailing	2	0	2
Shooting	1	0	1
Total	7	2	9

== Results by event ==
=== Athletics ===
Men's 800 metres:

- Spyros Spyrou — Round 1: 3:34:32, Semifinals: 3:43.49

Men's 1500 metres:

- Spyros Spyrou — Round 1: 1:49.84

Men's triple jump:

- Marios Hadjiandreou — Preliminary: 15.95 metres (did not advance)

Women's long jump:

- Maria Lambrou Teloni — Preliminary: 6.29 metres (did not advance)

Women's 3 000 metres:

- Andri Avraam — Round 1: 9:02.18 (did not advance)

Women's 10 000 metres:

- Andri Avraam — Preliminary: 32:59.30 min (did not advance)

Women's Marathon

- Katerina Pratsi — did not finish (→ no ranking)

=== Judo ===
Men's Competition:

- Michalis Skouroumounis
- Elias Ioannou

=== Sailing ===
Men's Double-Handed Dinghy (470)

- Christos Christoforou, Andreas Karapatakis - (27th place)
