= Rosa Irene Campos =

Mexican windsurfer (born 1986)

Personal information
- Nationality: Mexican
- Born: 9 February 1986 (age 39)

Sport
- Sport: Windsurfing

Rosa Irene Campos (born 9 February 1986) is a Mexican windsurfer. She competed in the women's Mistral One Design event at the 2004 Summer Olympics.
