= Cyprus at the 1984 Summer Olympics =

- IOC code: CYP
- NOC: Cyprus Olympic Committee

in Los Angeles
- Competitors: 10 (all men) in 4 sports
- Flag bearer: Marios Kassianidis
- Medals: Gold 0 Silver 0 Bronze 0 Total 0

Summer Olympics appearances (overview)
- 1980; 1984; 1988; 1992; 1996; 2000; 2004; 2008; 2012; 2016; 2020; 2024

Cyprus competed at the 1984 Summer Olympics in Los Angeles, United States. Ten competitors, all men, took part in nine events in four sports.

== Athletics ==
Men's 10.000 metres

- Marios Kassianidis
  - Qualifying Heat – 29:06.08 (→ did not advance)

Men's Marathon

- Marios Kassianidis – 2:32:51 (→ 62nd place)
- Filippos Filippou – did not finish (→ no ranking)

Men's 3.000m Steeplechase:

- Philippos Philippou
  - Semifinals – 8:39.47 (→ did not advance)

Men's Long Jump

- Dimitrios Araouzos
  - Qualification – 5.67m (→ did not advance, 30th place)

== Cycling ==
One cyclist represented Cyprus in 1984.

Individual road race

- Spyros Agrotis – did not finish (→ no ranking)

== Judo ==
Men's under 78 kg:

- Ioannis Kouyallis – Preliminary:Lost to Gueye-Eljdji from Senegal

Men's under 86 kg:

- Costas Papacostas – Preliminary:Lost to Nose Seiki from Japan

== Shooting ==
Men's trap:

- Anastasios Lordos – 173 (47th position)
- Demetrios Papachrysostomou – 176 (35th position)

Men's skeet:

- Petros Kyritsis – 192 (13th position)
- Michael Tymvios – 85 (abandon)
