= Cyprus at the 1980 Summer Olympics =

- IOC code: CYP
- NOC: Cyprus Olympic Committee

in Moscow
- Competitors: 14 (12 men/2 women) in 3 sports
- Flag bearer: Kostas Papakostas
- Medals: Gold 0 Silver 0 Bronze 0 Total 0

Summer Olympics appearances (overview)
- 1980; 1984; 1988; 1992; 1996; 2000; 2004; 2008; 2012; 2016; 2020; 2024

Cyprus competed at the Summer Olympic Games for the first time at the 1980 Summer Olympics in Moscow, USSR.

== Results by event ==
=== Judo ===
Men's under 60 kg

- Spyros Spyrou
  1. First Round — Defeated Ashkhoussen Mamodaly Yusei Gachi (Madagascar)
  2. Second Round —Lost Jürg Röthlisberger (Switzerland)

Men's under 65 kg

- Constantinos Constantinou - Round 1

Men's under 71 kg

- Neophytos Aresti - Round 1

Men's under 86 kg

- Spyros Spyrou
  1. First Round — Estrella Milton (Ecuador) in 5:00
  2. Second Round —Lost Holliday Hohn Ippon (United Kingdom|Great Britain) in 2:28

Men's under 95 kg

- Panicos Evripidou - Round 1

=== Swimming ===
Men's 100 m Backstroke

- Laris Phylactou
  - Heats — 1:08.92 (→ did not advance)

Men's 100 m Breaststroke

- Linos Petridis

Men's 100 m Butterfly

- Linos Petridis
  - Heats — 1:06.61 (→ did not advance)

Men's 100 m Freestyle

- Laris Phylactou
  - Heats — 57,41 (→ did not advance)

Women's 100 m Backstroke

- Annabel Drousiotou
  - Heats — 1:15.85 (→ did not advance)

Women's 100 m Freestyle

- Olga Loizou
  - Heats — 1:06.50 (→ did not advance)

=== Sailing ===
Men's Finn (single handed dinghy)

- Laris Phylactou- 147 points (21st place)

Men's Double-Handed Dinghy (470)

- Demetrios Demetriou, Panayiotis Nicolaou - 117 points (14th place)
