= Shooting at the 2004 Summer Olympics – Men's skeet =

Men's skeet at the Games of the XXVIII Olympiad
- Venue: Markópoulo Olympic Shooting; Centre
- Date: August 21, 2004; August 22, 2004
- Competitors: 41 from 32 nations
- Winning score: 149

Medalists
1st place, gold medalist(s)		Andrea Benelli	Italy
2nd place, silver medalist(s)		Marko Kemppainen	Finland
3rd place, bronze medalist(s)		Juan Miguel Rodríguez	Cuba

The men's skeet shooting competition at the 2004 Summer Olympics was held on August 21 and 22 at the Markópoulo Olympic Shooting Centre near Athens, Greece.

The event consisted of two rounds: a qualifier and a final. In the qualifier, each shooter fired 5 sets of 25 shots in the set order of skeet shooting.

In this last Olympic skeet competition before rules were changed, Marko Kemppainen attained a perfect 125 to break the world and Olympic records in the qualification round, but missed one target in the final, allowing Andrea Benelli to catch him up with a score of 149 to force the gold medal shoot-off. Meanwhile, Cuba's Juan Miguel Rodríguez had shared a score of 147 targets with Qatar's Nasser Al-Attiyah and United States' Shawn Dulohery, until he fired a perfect ten in a three-way shoot-off to grab the bronze.

== Records ==
Prior to this competition, the existing world and Olympic records were as follows.

Qualification records
World record	Abdullah Al-Rashidi (KUW)	125	Bangkok, Thailand	9 July 2004
Olympic record	Mykola Milchev (UKR)	125	Sydney, Australia	23 September 2000

Final records
World record	Valeriy Shomin (RUS)	150 (125+25)	Granada, Spain	28 June 2003
Olympic record	Mykola Milchev (UKR)	150 (125+25)	Sydney, Australia	23 September 2000

== Qualification round ==
Rank	Athlete	Country	1	2	3	Day 1	4	5	Total	SO 1	SO 2	Notes
1	Marko Kemppainen	Finland	25	25	25	75	25	25	125			Q, =WR
2	Andrea Benelli	Italy	24	25	25	74	25	25	124			Q
3	Shawn Dulohery	United States	25	24	25	74	23	25	122	4		Q
4	Juan Miguel Rodríguez	Cuba	23	25	25	73	25	24	122	4		Q
5	Nasser Al-Attiyah	Qatar	24	24	25	73	25	24	122	4		Q
6	Harald Jensen	Norway	24	24	24	72	25	25	122	3	2	Q
7	Michael Nielsen	Denmark	25	23	25	73	25	24	122	3	1	
8	Erik Watndal	Norway	25	22	24	71	25	25	121			
9	Georgios Achilleos	Cyprus	24	24	25	73	23	25	121			
9	Abdullah Al-Rashidi	Kuwait	25	24	24	73	24	24	121			
9	James Graves	United States	25	25	23	73	24	24	121			
9	Mykola Milchev	Ukraine	23	25	24	72	24	25	121			
9	Jan Sychra	Czech Republic	25	25	24	74	23	24	121			
9	Anthony Terras	France	25	23	25	73	23	25	121			
15	Sergey Aksyutin	Russia	25	24	25	74	23	23	120			
15	Saied Al-Mutairi	Saudi Arabia	24	25	25	74	24	22	120			
15	Diego Duarte	Colombia	24	24	25	73	23	24	120			
15	Jin Di	China	24	25	24	73	25	22	120			
15	Paul Rahman	Australia	25	23	24	72	24	24	120			
15	Valeriy Shomin	Russia	25	25	25	75	22	23	120			
21	Hennie Dompeling	Netherlands	23	24	24	71	23	25	119			
21	Julio Elizardo Dujarric Lembcke	Dominican Republic	25	24	24	73	24	22	119			
21	Ennio Falco	Italy	23	24	24	71	25	23	119			
21	Andrzej Głyda	Poland	23	25	23	71	24	24	119			
21	Andrei Inešin	Estonia	24	25	24	73	23	23	119			
21	Antonis Nikolaidis	Cyprus	23	24	25	72	23	24	119			
21	Georgios Salavantakis	Greece	22	25	24	71	25	23	119			
21	Guillermo Alfredo Torres	Cuba	24	25	24	73	22	24	119			
29	George Barton	Australia	25	23	24	72	23	23	118			
29	Mostafa Hamdy	Egypt	25	25	21	71	25	22	118			
31	Jorge Atalah	Chile	24	24	23	71	24	22	117			
31	Michael Maskell	Barbados	23	23	23	69	23	25	117			
31	Axel Wegner	Germany	23	25	24	72	22	23	117			
34	Richard Brickell	Great Britain	23	24	23	70	21	24	115			
34	Amr El-Gaiar	Egypt	24	22	23	69	23	23	115			
34	Jan-Cor van der Greef	Netherlands	24	23	24	71	20	24	115			
37	Saeed Al Maktoum	United Arab Emirates	23	24	23	70	22	22	114			
37	Khurram Inam	Pakistan	24	24	24	72	20	22	114			
37	Lee Suk-tae	South Korea	22	24	22	68	23	23	114			
40	Ricky Teh Chee Fei	Malaysia	24	22	23	69	21	23	113			
41	Roger Dahi	Syria	24	18	23	65	20	21	106			

=OR Equalled Olympic record – =WR Equalled World record – Q Qualified for final – SO 1 Shoot-off for third place – SO 2 Shoot-off for sixth place

== Final ==
Rank	Athlete	Qual	Final	Total	Bronze shoot-off	Gold shoot-off
1st place, gold medalist(s)	Andrea Benelli (ITA)	124	25	149		5
2nd place, silver medalist(s)	Marko Kemppainen (FIN)	125	24	149		4
3rd place, bronze medalist(s)	Juan Miguel Rodríguez (CUB)	122	25	147	10	
4	Nasser Al-Attiyah (QAT)	122	25	147	9	
5	Shawn Dulohery (USA)	122	25	147	5	
6	Harald Jensen (NOR)	122	23	145		
