= Lívia Győrbiró =

Hungarian windsurfer

Personal information
- Nationality: Hungarian
- Born: 8 September 1974 (age 50); Budapest, Hungary

Sport
- Sport: Windsurfing

Lívia Győrbiró (born 8 September 1974) is a Hungarian windsurfer. She competed in the women's Mistral One Design event at the 2004 Summer Olympics.
