= Sailing at the 2004 Summer Olympics – Women's Mistral One Design =

Women's Mistral One Design at the Games of the XXVIII Olympiad
- Line drawing of the Mistral One Design
- Venue: Agios Kosmas Olympic Sailing Centre
- Dates: First race: 15 August 2004; Last race: 25 August 2004
- Competitors: 26 from 26 nations

Medalists
1st place, gold medalist(s)		Faustine Merret	France
2nd place, silver medalist(s)		Yin Jian	China
3rd place, bronze medalist(s)		Alessandra Sensini	Italy

The women's Mistral One Design was a sailing event on the Sailing at the 2004 Summer Olympics program in Agios Kosmas Olympic Sailing Centre. Eleven races were scheduled and completed with one discard. 26 sailors, on 26 boards, from 26 nation competed.

== Race schedule ==
●	Practice races	●	Competition day	●	Last day of racing

Date	August																	
Date	12 Thu	13 Fri	14 Sat	15 Sun	16 Mon	17 Tue	18 Wed	19 Thu	20 Fri	21 Sat	22 Sun	23 Mon	24 Tue	25 Wed	26 Thu	27 Fri	28 Sat	29 Sun
Actual	●	●		1,2		S3	S4	S5	S6	S7,8		S9,10		S11				
Proposed	PR			S1,2	Res	S3,4	Res	S5,6	Res	S7,8	Res	S9,10	Res	S11				

== Final results ==
Rank	Country	Helmsman	Race 1		Race 2		Race 3		Race 4		Race 5		Race 6		Race 7		Race 8		Race 9		Race 10		Race 11		Total	Total – discard
Rank	Country	Helmsman	Pos.	Pts.	Pos.	Pts.	Pos.	Pts.	Pos.	Pts.	Pos.	Pts.	Pos.	Pts.	Pos.	Pts.	Pos.	Pts.	Pos.	Pts.	Pos.	Pts.	Pos.	Pts.	Total	Total – discard
1st place, gold medalist(s)	France	Faustine Merret	2	2.0	~~13~~	~~13.0~~	1	1.0	4	4.0	2	2.0	4	4.0	4	4.0	5	5.0	4	4.0	3	3.0	2	2.0	44.0	31.0
2nd place, silver medalist(s)	China	Yin Jian	~~11~~	~~11.0~~	6	6.0	2	2.0	6	6.0	4	4.0	1	1.0	1	1.0	1	1.0	2	2.0	9	9.0	1	1.0	44.0	33.0
3rd place, bronze medalist(s)	Italy	Alessandra Sensini	~~7~~	~~7.0~~	1	1.0	6	6.0	3	3.0	1	1.0	2	2.0	3	3.0	6	6.0	3	3.0	2	2.0	7	7.0	41.0	34 .0
4	Hong Kong	Lee Lai-shan	3	3.0	8	8.0	5	5.0	1	1.0	~~OCS~~	~~27.0~~	3	3.0	2	2.0	4	4.0	5	5.0	8	8.0	3	3.0	59.0	42 .0
5	New Zealand	Barbara Kendall	1	1.0	9	9.0	~~OCS~~	~~27.0~~	2	2.0	OCS	27.0	5	5.0	5	5.0	3	3.0	1	1.0	1	1.0	4	4.0	85.0	58.0
6	Australia	Jessica Crisp	4	4.0	11	11.0	~~13~~	~~13.0~~	5	5.0	7	7.0	6	6.0	7	7.0	7	7.0	9	9.0	5	5.0	13	13.0	87.0	74.0
7	Germany	Amelie Lux	~~18~~	~~18.0~~	17	17.0	15	15.0	8	8.0	8	8.0	9	9.0	10	10.0	2	2.0	6	6.0	6	6.0	6	6.0	105.0	87.0
8	Spain	Blanca Manchón	10	10.0	5	5.0	14	14.0	13	13.0	3	3.0	11	11.0	13	13.0	~~15~~	~~15.0~~	8	8.0	7	7.0	11	11.0	110.0	95.0
9	Great Britain	Natasha Sturges	~~16~~	~~16.0~~	10	10.0	3	3.0	9	9.0	9	9.0	14	14.0	12	12.0	11	11.0	15	15.0	11	11.0	9	9.0	119.0	103.0
10	Ukraine	Olha Maslivets	5	5.0	4	4.0	11	11.0	12	12.0	10	10.0	~~DSQ~~	~~27.0~~	8	8.0	9	9.0	11	11.0	13	13.0	20	20.0	130.0	103.0
11	Norway	Jannicke Stålstrøm	9	9.0	3	3.0	7	7.0	15	15.0	14	14.0	12	12.0	11	11.0	8	8.0	14	14.0	14	14.0	~~OCS~~	~~27.0~~	134.0	107.0
12	Poland	Zofia Klepacka	8	8.0	2	2.0	16	16.0	7	7.0	6	6.0	15	15.0	~~20~~	~~20.0~~	19	19.0	20	20.0	4	4.0	16	16.0	133.0	113.0
13	Israel	Lee Korzits	15	15.0	15	15.0	12	12.0	~~17~~	~~17.0~~	12	12.0	8	8.0	14	14.0	12	12.0	7	7.0	10	10.0	12	12.0	134.0	117.0
14	Switzerland	Anja Käser	14	14.0	12	12.0	10	10.0	10	10.0	~~OCS~~	~~27.0~~	7	7.0	15	15.0	13	13.0	12	12.0	18	18.0	10	10.0	148.0	121.0
15	Greece	Athina Frai	6	6.0	18	18.0	4	4.0	16	16.0	11	11.0	17	17.0	9	9.0	16	16.0	18	18.0	~~OCS~~	~~27.0~~	8	8.0	150.0	123.0
16	United States	Lanee Beashel	13	13.0	16	16.0	9	9.0	18	18.0	17	17.0	13	13.0	6	6.0	14	14.0	~~19~~	~~19.0~~	15	15.0	5	5.0	145.0	126.0
17	Japan	Masako Imai	12	12.0	14	14.0	17	17.0	11	11.0	5	5.0	16	16.0	17	17.0	10	10.0	16	16.0	17	17.0	~~18~~	~~18.0~~	153.0	135.0
18	Belgium	Sigrid Rondelez	17	17.0	7	7.0	19	19.0	14	14.0	15	15.0	18	18.0	18	18.0	~~21~~	~~21.0~~	13	13.0	12	12.0	15	15.0	169.0	148.0
19	Bulgaria	Irina Konstantinova	20	20.0	~~22~~	~~22.0~~	8	8.0	20	20.0	13	13.0	10	10.0	16	16.0	18	18.0	17	17.0	16	16.0	14	14.0	174.0	152.0
20	Latvia	Vita Matīse	~~22~~	~~22.0~~	21	21.0	20	20.0	21	21.0	20	20.0	21	21.0	23	23.0	20	20.0	10	10.0	19	19.0	19	19.0	205.0	193.0
21	Cyprus	Gavriella Chatzidamianou	21	21.0	~~DNF~~	~~27.0~~	18	18.0	23	23.0	16	16.0	19	19.0	19	19.0	17	17.0	22	22.0	23	23.0	17	17.0	222.0	195.0
22	Argentina	Catalina Walther	19	19.0	23	23.0	21	21.0	19	19.0	19	19.0	20	20.0	21	21.0	23	23.0	23	23.0	20	20.0	~~OCS~~	~~27.0~~	235.0	208.0
23	Mexico	Rosa Irene Campos	23	23.0	~~25~~	~~25.0~~	23	23.0	22	22.0	18	18.0	24	24.0	22	22.0	22	22.0	21	21.0	24	24.0	21	21.0	245.0	220.0
24	Hungary	Lívia Győrbiró	24	24.0	19	19.0	22	22.0	~~25~~	~~25.0~~	22	22.0	22	22.0	25	25.0	25	25.0	24	24.0	21	21.0	23	23.0	252.0	227.0
25	Brazil	Carolina Borges	~~25~~	~~25.0~~	20	20.0	24	24.0	24	24.0	21	21.0	23	23.0	24	24.0	24	24.0	25	25.0	22	22.0	22	22.0	254.0	229.0
26	Puerto Rico	Karla Barrera	~~26~~	~~26.0~~	24	24.0	25	25.0	26	26.0	23	23.0	25	25.0	26	26.0	26	26.0	26	26.0	25	25.0	24	24.0	276.0	250.0

Legend: DNF – Did not finish; DNS – Did not start; DSQ – Disqualified; OCS – On the course side of the starting line;
Discard is crossed out and does not count for the overall result.

== Race Start Times ==
- Race 1 - 14:02 15 Aug 2004
- Race 2 - 15:19 15 Aug 2004
- Race 3 - 13:00 17 Aug 2004
- Race 4 - 15:36 18 Aug 2004
- Race 5 - 18:34 19 Aug 2004
- Race 6 - 18:01 20 Aug 2004
- Race 7 - 15:37 21 Aug 2004
- Race 8 - 16:56 21 Aug 2004
- Race 9 - 13:50 23 Aug 2004
- Race 10 - 15:46 23 Aug 2004
- Race 11 - 14:22 25 Aug 2004

== Daily standings ==
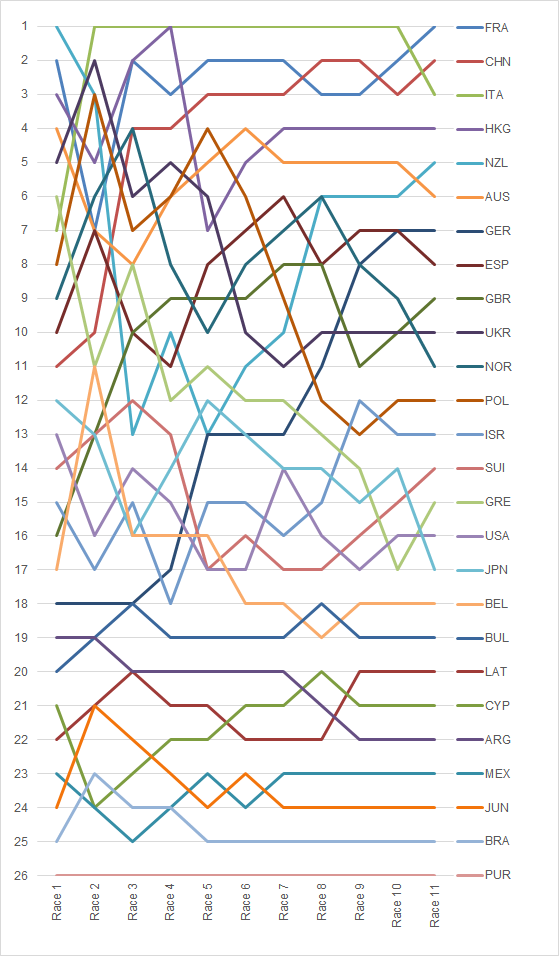
Graph showing the daily standings in the Women's Mistral One Design during the 2004 Summer Olympics
