= Karla Barrera =

Puerto Rican windsurfer (born 1984)

Personal information
- Nationality: Puerto Rican
- Born: 22 February 1984 (age 41); San Juan, Puerto Rico
- Height: 164 cm (5 ft 5 in)
- Weight: 54 kg (119 lb)

Sport
- Sport: Windsurfing

Karla Barrera (born 22 February 1984) is a Puerto Rican windsurfer. She competed in the women's Mistral One Design event at the 2004 Summer Olympics.
