= Marko Kemppainen =

Finnish sport shooter (born 1976)

Personal information
- Born: 13 July 1976 (age 50) Kajaani, Finland
Medal record
Men's shooting
Representing Finland
Olympic Games
Silver medal – second place	2004 Athens	Skeet

Marko Kemppainen (born 13 July 1976 in Kajaani) is a Finnish sports shooter. He competes in skeet shooting. He was a silver medallist at the 2004 Summer Olympics

Kemppainen won a bronze medal at the 2001 World Championship in Cairo. He represented Finland at the 2004 Summer Olympics. By winning the silver medal in men's skeet event he took the first medal for Finland in the Athens Olympics.
