= Sailing at the 2011 Pan American Games – Women's RS:X =

Women's sailboard at the 2011 Pan American Games
- Venue: Vallarta Yacht Club
- Dates: October 17 - October 23
- Competitors: 7 from 7 nations

Medalists
Gold medal	Patrícia Freitas	Brazil
Silver medal	Demita Vega	Mexico
Bronze medal	Farrah Hall	United States

The women's sailboard competition of the sailing events at the 2011 Pan American Games in Guadalajara were held from October 17 to October 23 at the Vallarta Yacht Club in Puerto Vallarta. The defending champion was Dominique Vallee of Canada.

Points were assigned based on the finishing position in each race (1 for first, 2 for second, etc.). The points were totaled from the top 9 results of the first 10 races, with lower totals being better. If a sailor was disqualified or did not complete the race, 8 points were assigned for that race (as there were 7 sailors in this competition). The top 5 sailors at that point competed in the final race, with placings counting double for final score. The sailor with the lowest total score won.

== Schedule ==
All times are Central Standard Time (UTC-6).

Date	Time	Round
October 17, 2011	13:00	1 and 2 races
October 18, 2011	13:00	3 and 4 races
October 19, 2011	13:00	5 and 6 races
October 21, 2011	13:00	7 and 8 races
October 22, 2011	13:00	9 and 10 races
October 23, 2011	15:20	Medal race

== Results ==
Race M is the medal race in which only the top 5 competitors took part. Each boat can drop its lowest result provided that all ten races are completed. If less than ten races are completed all races will count. Boats cannot drop their result in the medal race.

Rank	Athlete	Race											Total Points	Net Points
Rank	Athlete	1	2	3	4	5	6	7	8	9	10	M	Total Points	Net Points
1st place, gold medalist(s)	Patrícia Freitas (BRA)	(2)	1	1	1	2	1	1	1	1	1	2	14	12
2nd place, silver medalist(s)	Demita Vega (MEX)	1	5	2	3	1	3	(8); OCS	2	3	4	4	36	28
3rd place, bronze medalist(s)	Farrah Hall (USA)	3	2	(5)	3	3	2	2	5	4	2	10	44	36
4	Nikola Girke (CAN)	(4)	3	3	4	4	4	4	4	2	3	6	41	37
5	Jazmín López Becker (ARG)	5	4	4	5	5	(6)	3	3	6	5	8	53	47
6	Anayansi Pérez (CUB)	(6)	6	6	6	6	5	5	6	5	6	–	57	51
7	Monique Meijer (AHO)	(7)	7	7	7	7	7	6	7	7	7	–	69	62
