= Anna Khvorikova =

Russian windsurfer

Personal information
- Full name: Anna Sergeyevna Khvorikova
- Nickname: Anya
- Nationality: Russia
- Born: 30 August 1997 (age 28) Taganrog, Russia

Sailing career
- Sport: Sailing
- Club: Krestovsky Island Sailing Sports School
- Coached by: Maksym Oberemko
- Class: Sailboard

Anna Sergeyevna Khvorikova (Russian: Анна Сергеевна Хворикова; born 30 August 1997) is a Russian windsurfer, who specialized in Neil Pryde RS:X class. She was the country's top female windsurfer for the rescheduled 2020 Summer Olympics, finishing a lowly twenty-second place. A member and pupil of Krestovsky Island Sailing Sports School in her current residence St. Petersburg, Khvorikova trained most of her competitive sporting career under the tutelage of her personal coach, six-time Olympian and former Ukrainian-born windsurfer Maksym Oberemko.

Khvorikova competed for her maiden Russian sailing squad in the women's RS:X class at the rescheduled 2020 Summer Olympics in Tokyo. With the original nominee and Rio 2016 bronze medalist Stefania Elfutina withdrawing from the team due to health concerns, Khvorikova topped the selection criteria and lock the country's berth based on her cumulative scores attained at various international regattas stipulated by the Russian Yachting Federation. She enjoyed the initial quarter of the series with a couple of top ten marks recorded before fading rapidly towards the back of the fleet. Struggling to catch the other windsurfers for the remainder of her races under breezy conditions, Khvorikova ended her Olympic campaign in the twenty-second overall position with a net grade of 224 points.
