= Yasuko Kosuge =

Japanese windsurfer (born 1974)

Personal information
- Nationality: Japan
- Born: 26 May 1974 (age 52) Hayama, Kanagawa, Japan
- Height: 1.61 m (5 ft 3 1/2 in)
- Weight: 54 kg (119 lb)

Sailing career
- Sport: Sailing
- Club: Toyama Sailing Federation
- Class: Sailboard

Yasuko Kosuge (小菅 寧子, Kosuge Yasuko; born 26 May 1974) is a Japanese former windsurfer, who specialized in the RS:X class. She was the country's top female windsurfer for the 2008 Summer Olympics, finishing in thirteenth place. A member of Toyama Sailing Federation, Kosuge trained most of her competitive sporting career for the national team.

Kosuge competed for the Japanese sailing squad, as a 34-year-old, in the inaugural women's RS:X class at the 2008 Summer Olympics in Beijing. She topped the selection criteria in a duel against the quota recipient Yuki Sunaga for the country's RS:X berth, based on her cumulative scores in a series of international regattas approved by the Japan Sailing Federation. Kosuge enjoyed the initial half of the series with a couple of top ten marks recorded, before fading temporarily towards the middle of the fleet. She made a late surge to finish seventh on the final leg but fell short to enter the medal race by the narrowest margin, sitting her in thirteenth overall with 102 net points.
