= 2005 ISSF World Cup =

For the 2005 ISSF World Cup in the fifteen Olympic shooting events, the World Cup Final was held in August 2005 in Munich, Germany for the rifle and pistol events, and in November 2005 in Dubai, United Arab Emirates for the shotgun events.

== Rifle and pistol ==
The rifle and pistol World Cup Final in Munich, held from August 23 to August 28, was heavily dominated by Russia and China. Two world records were set during the competitions: Sergei Alifirenko's 589 in 25 m Rapid Fire Pistol was the best result of the year and hence also world record, as the rules were changed at the turn of the season, and Sergei Martynov achieved the maximum 600 in the qualification round of the Prone position event for a fourth time (although he was unable to retain his two-point lead through the final).

The winners were:

- Sergei Kovalenko, Russia, in men's 50 m Rifle Three Positions
- Eric Uptagrafft, United States, in men's 50 m Rifle Prone
- Denis Sokolov, Russia, in men's 10 m Air Rifle
- Boris Kokorev, Russia, in men's 50 m Pistol
- Sergei Alifirenko, Russia, in men's 25 m Rapid Fire Pistol
- Mikhail Nestruev, Russia, in men's 10 m Air Pistol
- Wu Liuxi, China, in women's 50 m Rifle Three Positions
- Du Li, China, in women's 10 m Air Rifle
- Chen Ying, China, in women's 25 m Pistol
- Jasna Šekarić, Serbia and Montenegro, in women's 10 m Air Pistol

== Shotgun ==
The shotgun competitions were held in Dubai from November 19 to November 25. Haley Dunn beat her own junior world record in the Skeet qualification round and went on to equal the final world record. In the men's Skeet competitions, two Cypriots equalled the qualification record, one of them proceeding with a perfect final and equalling the final record as well. The winners were:

- Giovanni Pellielo, Italy, in men's Trap
- Håkan Dahlby, Sweden, in men's Double Trap
- Antonis Nicolaides, Cyprus, in men's Skeet
- Elena Tkach, Russia, in women's Trap
- Haley Dunn, United States, in women's Skeet
