= Cyprus at the 2024 Summer Olympics =

- IOC code: CYP
- NOC: Cyprus Olympic Committee
- Website: www.olympic.org.cy (in Greek and English)

in Paris, France 26 July 2024 – 11 August 2024
- Competitors: 15 (6 men and 9 women) in 8 sports
- Flag bearer (opening): Milan Trajkovic & Elena Kulichenko
- Flag bearer (closing): Vera Tugolukova
- Medals Ranked 74th: Gold 0 Silver 1 Bronze 0 Total 1

Summer Olympics appearances (overview)
- 1980; 1984; 1988; 1992; 1996; 2000; 2004; 2008; 2012; 2016; 2020; 2024

Cyprus competed at the 2024 Summer Olympics in Paris from 26 July to 11 August 2024. It was the nation's twelfth consecutive appearance at the Summer Olympics.

== Medalists ==
Medal	Name	Sport	Event	Date
Silver	Pavlos Kontides	Sailing	Men's ILCA 7	7 August

== Competitors ==
The following is the list of number of competitors in the Games.

Sport	Men	Women	Total
Athletics	1	2	3
Cycling	0	1	1
Fencing	1	0	1
Gymnastics	1	1	2
Judo	0	1	1
Sailing	2	2	4
Shooting	0	1	1
Swimming	1	1	2
Total	6	9	15

== Athletics ==
Cypriot track and field athletes qualified for Paris 2024, by receiving the direct universality spots in the following event:

Key

- Note–Ranks given for track events are within the athlete's heat only
- Q = Qualified for the next round
- q = Qualified for the next round as a fastest loser or, in field events, by position without achieving the qualifying target
- NR = National record
- N/A = Round not applicable for the event
- Bye = Athlete not required to compete in round

Track and road events

Athlete	Event	Preliminary		Heat		Repechage		Semifinal		Final	
Athlete	Event	Result	Rank	Result	Rank	Result	Rank	Result	Rank	Result	Rank
Milan Trajkovic	Men's 110 m hurdles	—		13.43	4 q	Bye		13.32	3	Did not advance	
Olivia Fotopoulou	Women's 100 m	Bye		11.50	7	—		Did not advance			
Olivia Fotopoulou	Women's 200 m	—		23.07	5 R	22.92 SB	1 Q	22.98	8	Did not advance	

Field events

Athlete	Event	Qualification		Final	
Athlete	Event	Distance	Position	Distance	Position
Elena Kulichenko	Women's high jump	1.92	7 q	1.95	=7

== Cycling ==
=== Road ===
Cyprus entered one female rider to compete in the road race events at the Olympic, through the establishment UCI Nation Ranking.

Athlete	Event	Time	Rank
Antri Christoforou	Women's road race	4:10:20	62

== Fencing ==
Cyprus entered one fencer into the Olympic competition, which marking the nation's debut at these sports. Alex Tofalides qualified for the games by winning the 2024 Europe Zonal Qualifying Tournament in Differdange, Luxembourg.

Athlete	Event	Round of 64	Round of 32	Round of 16	Quarterfinal	Semifinal	Final / BM	
Athlete	Event	Opposition Score	Opposition Score	Opposition Score	Opposition Score	Opposition Score	Opposition Score	Rank
Alex Tofalides	Men's foil	Wojtkowiak (POL); W 15–10	Itkin (USA); L 10–15	Did not advance				

== Gymnastics ==
=== Artistic ===
Cyprus qualified one gymnast, Marios Georgiou, who was the highest-ranked eligible athlete in the all-around at the 2024 European Championships in Rimini, Italy.

Men

Athlete	Event	Qualification								Final							
Athlete	Event	Apparatus						Total	Rank	Apparatus						Total	Rank
Athlete	Event	F	PH	R	V	PB	HB	Total	Rank	F	PH	R	V	PB	HB	Total	Rank
Marios Georgiou	All-around	13.266	13.400	12.900	13.966	11.600	14.366	79.498	33	Did not advance							
Marios Georgiou	Horizontal bar	—					14.366	—	8	—					13.333	—	6

=== Rhythmic ===
Cyprus entered one rhythmic gymnast into the games by virtue of the highest rank eligible individual results, at the 2024 European Championships in Budapest, Hungary.

Athlete	Event	Qualification						Final					
Athlete	Event	Hoop	Ball	Clubs	Ribbon	Total	Rank	Hoop	Ball	Clubs	Ribbon	Total	Rank
Vera Tugolukova	Individual	31.150 (15)	31.200 (18)	30.600 (14)	28.800 (19)	121.750	16	Did not advance					

== Judo ==
Cyprus qualified one judoka for the following weight class at the Games. Sofia Asvesta (women's half-lightweight, 52 kg) got qualified via continental quota based on Olympic point rankings.

Athlete	Event	Round of 64	Round of 32	Round of 16	Quarterfinals	Semifinals	Repechage	Final / BM	
Athlete	Event	Opposition Result	Opposition Result	Opposition Result	Opposition Result	Opposition Result	Opposition Result	Opposition Result	Rank
Sofia Asvesta	Women's −52 kg	—	Iraoui (MAR); W 01–00	Buchard (FRA); L 00–10	Did not advance				

== Sailing ==
Cypriot sailors qualified one boat in each of the following classes through the 2023 Sailing World Championships in The Hague, Netherlands; and through the 2024 Semaine Olympique Française (Last Chance Regatta) in Hyères, France.

Elimination events

Athlete	Event	Race																				Net points	Rank	Race													Final rank
Athlete	Event	1	2	3	4	5	6	7	8	9	10	11	12	13	14	15	16	17	18	19	20	Net points	Rank	QF	SF1	SF2	SF3	SF4	SF5	SF6	F1	F2	F3	F4	F5	F6	Final rank
Denis Taradin	Men's Formula Kite	11	4	12	6	~~16~~	16	~~19~~	Cancelled									—				49	12	Did not advance													
Natasa Lappa	Women's IQFoil	16	~~25~~	7	17	20	21	16	10	6	16	13	~~25~~	6	22	Cancelled						170	19	Did not advance													

Medal race events

Athlete	Event	Race											Net points	Final rank
Athlete	Event	1	2	3	4	5	6	7	8	9	10	M*	Net points	Final rank
Pavlos Kontides	Men's ILCA 7	17	5	~~27~~	5	10	5	3	7	Cancelled		4	56	2nd place, silver medalist(s)
Marilena Makri	Women's ILCA 6	~~32~~	17	29	31	26	26	30	17	19	Cancelled	EL	195	30

M = Medal race; EL = Eliminated – did not advance into the medal race

== Shooting ==
Cypriot shooters achieved one quota places for Paris 2024 based on the re-allocations of universality spots.

Athlete	Event	Qualification		Final	
Athlete	Event	Points	Rank	Points	Rank
Konstantia Nikolaou	Women's skeet	116	20	Did not advance	

== Swimming ==
Cyprus sent two swimmers to compete at the 2024 Paris Olympics.

Athlete	Event	Heat		Semifinal		Final	
Athlete	Event	Time	Rank	Time	Rank	Time	Rank
Nikolas Antoniou	Men's 100 m freestyle	50.35	43	Did not advance			
Kalia Antoniou	Women's 100 m freestyle	54.72	18	Did not advance			

== See also ==
- Cyprus at the 2024 Winter Youth Olympics
