= Yin Jian (windsurfer) =

Chinese windsurfer

Medal record

Women's sailing

Representing China

Olympic Games
Gold medal – first place	2008 Beijing	RS:X
Silver medal – second place	2004 Athens	Mistral

Asian Games
Silver medal – second place	2002 Busan	Mistral

Yin Jian (simplified Chinese: 殷剑; traditional Chinese: 殷劍; pinyin: Yīn Jiàn; born December 25, 1978, in Xichang, Liangshan, Sichuan) is a double Olympic medal winning Chinese sailor, in women's windsurfing.

Yin won the silver medal in the 2004 women's Olympic sailboard competition. She was the 2008 Olympic women's windsurfing champion, achieving dominance over the fleet in light wind conditions with four race victories.

2008 Summer Olympic regatta

	Points												
Race	1	2	3	4	5	6	7	8	9	10	Medal race	Net	Position
	1	1	1	3	3	~~13~~	7	8	8	1	6	39	1
