= Georgios Achilleos =

Cypriot sport shooter

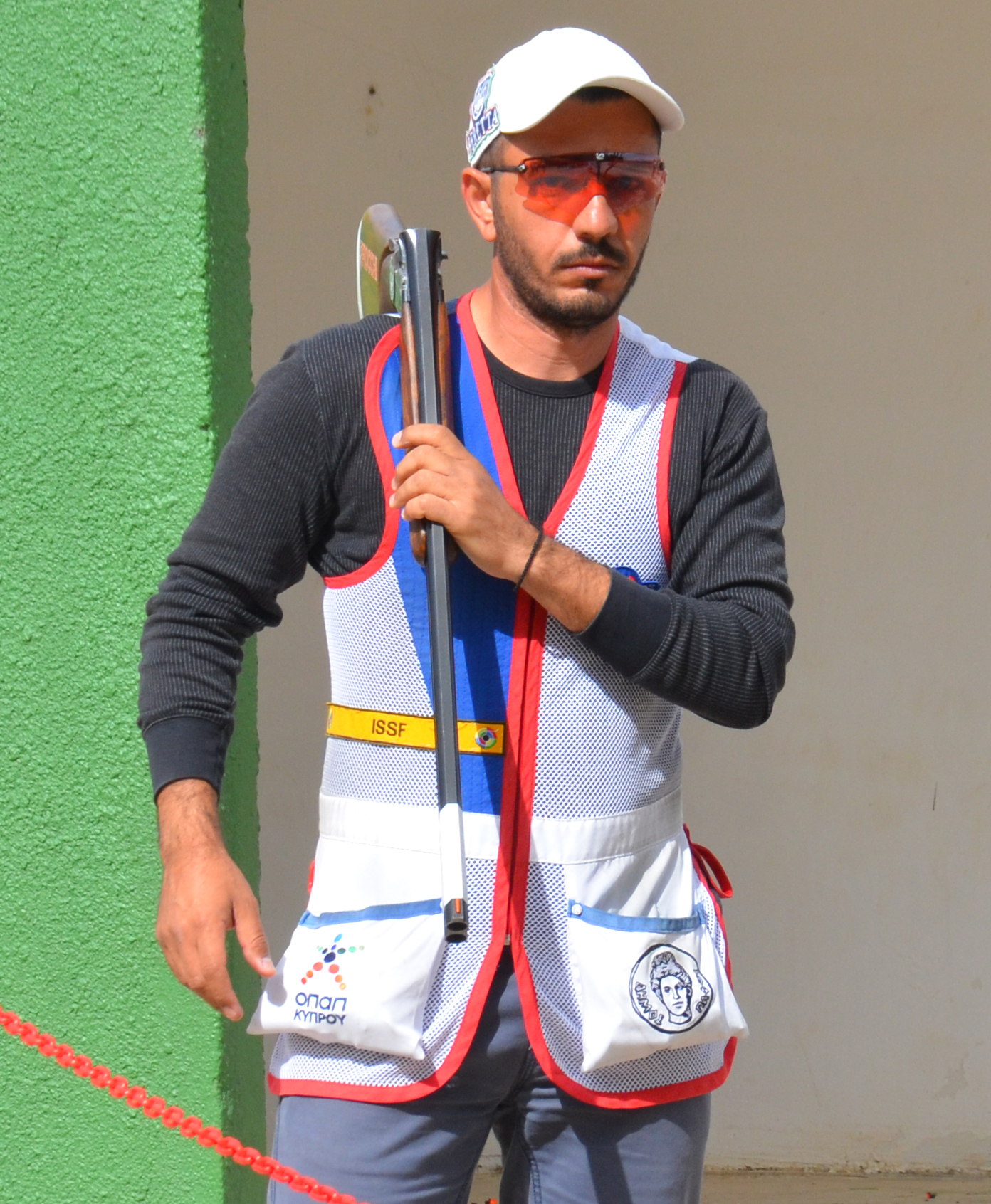

Personal information
- Nationality: Cypriot
- Born: 24 December 1980 (age 45) London, UK
- Height: 174 cm (5 ft 9 in)
- Weight: 83 kg (183 lb)

Sport
- Country: Cyprus
- Sport: Shooting
- Event: Skeet
Medal record
Men's shooting
Representing Cyprus
World Championships
Gold medal – first place	2007 Nicosia	Skeet individual
Gold medal – first place	2007 Nicosia	Skeet team
Gold medal – first place	2010 Munich	Skeet team
Silver medal – second place	2001 Cairo	Skeet team
Silver medal – second place	2009 Maribor	Skeet individual
Silver medal – second place	2019 Lonato	Skeet team
Bronze medal – third place	2010 Munich	Skeet individual
Bronze medal – third place	2017 Moscow	Skeet individual
World Cup Final
Gold medal – first place	2007 Belgrade	Skeet individual
Bronze medal – third place	2005 Dubai	Skeet individual
Bronze medal – third place	2009 Beijing	Skeet individual
World Cup
Gold medal – first place	2007 Santo Domingo	Skeet individual
Gold medal – first place	2008 Belgrade	Skeet individual
Gold medal – first place	2009 San Marino	Skeet individual
Gold medal – first place	2010 Dorset	Skeet individual
Gold medal – first place	2010 Lonato	Skeet individual
Gold medal – first place	2012 Lonato	Skeet individual
Silver medal – second place	2003 New Delhi	Skeet individual
Silver medal – second place	2005 Americana	Skeet individual
Silver medal – second place	2007 Lonato	Skeet individual
Silver medal – second place	2009 Munich	Skeet individual
Silver medal – second place	2011 Maribor	Skeet individual
Silver medal – second place	2011 Sydney	Skeet individual
Silver medal – second place	2017 Larnaca	Skeet individual
Bronze medal – third place	2000 Lonato	Skeet individual
Bronze medal – third place	2005 Changwon	Skeet individual
European Championships
Gold medal – first place	2007 Granada	Skeet individual
Bronze medal – third place	2012 Larnaca	Skeet individual
Bronze medal – third place	2013 Suhl	Skeet individual
European Games
Silver medal – second place	2015 Baku	Mixed Skeet
Commonwealth Games
Gold medal – first place	2006 Melbourne	Skeet individual
Gold medal – first place	2006 Melbourne	Skeet pairs
Gold medal – first place	2010 Delhi	Skeet pairs
Gold medal – first place	2014 Glasgow	Skeet individual
Gold medal – first place	2018 Gold Coast	Skeet individual
Silver medal – second place	2010 Delhi	Skeet individual
Mediterranean Games
Silver medal – second place	2009 Pescara	Skeet individual
Silver medal – second place	2013 Mersin	Skeet individual
Bronze medal – third place	2005 Almería	Skeet individual
Games of the Small States of Europe
Silver medal – second place	2001 San Marino	Skeet individual
Bronze medal – third place	2003 Malta	Skeet individual
Juniors Shooting
World Championships
Gold medal – first place	1999 Tampere	Skeet individual
European Championships
Silver medal – second place	1998 Nicosia	Skeet individual

Georgios Achilleos (Greek: Γεώργιος Αχιλλέως; born 24 December 1980) is a Cypriot sports shooter and past World titlist and World No. 1 in Skeet.

He is a four-time Skeet Shooting medalist in the World Championships, and a four-time Olympian, with his 5th position in Beijing 2008 being to date (as of 2017) Cyprus’ third-best all time placing at the Olympics, after Pavlos Kontides’ silver medal in Laser sailing in London 2012 and Antonis Nikolaidis’ 4th place in Skeet Shooting in Beijing 2008.

He was the national flag bearer at the 2004 and 2008 Summer Olympics.

Achilleos has the existing distinction of being the inaugural Cypriot athlete to set a World Record in an Olympic Sport. He is the current WR holder after shooting 125/125 at the 2015 Larnaca ISSF World Cup. His inaugural World Record was in 2005 in Dubai where he scored 124+24.

== Early life and career ==
Achilleos was born in London, United Kingdom in 1980. His parents originate from the town of Paphos on the west coast of Cyprus. He started competing in Skeet Shooting in a young age and recorded his first success in the Junior level. His international debut was at the 1997 European Championships in Sipoo, Finland where he took 9th place. His first major medal (silver) came at the 1998 European Championships, held in Nicosia, Cyprus. Achilleos competed in the 1998 World Championship in Barcelona, Spain taking 10th place.

The 1999 season was a breakthrough year for Achilleos. His debut World Cup in the Men's category ended in 16th place in Lima. He placed 31st in Kumamoto and European Championship (35th at Poussan. He won gold in the Junior's event at the 1999 World Championship in Tampere, Finland. His last major Junior distinction came in 2000 (after he already started regularly competing as a Senior), when he equaled the Junior World Record at the 2000 Lonato World Cup with 123+24, and took away a bronze medal. Achilleos automatically qualified for the 2000 Sidney Summer Olympics at the age of 19.

== Summer Olympics ==
He has represented the island in the 2000 Summer Olympics ranking 23rd, 2004 Summer Olympics ranking 9th, 2008 Summer Olympics ranking 5th and 2012 Summer Olympics where he finished in 11th place.

Olympic Games results
Event	2000	2004	2008	2012
Skeet	23rd 119	9th 121	5th 119+24	11th 118

=== Sydney 2000 ===
Just a few months before turning 20, George Achilleos was named a member of Team Cyprus at the 2000 Summer Olympics, held in Sydney. The young Cypriot started the event with the best possible way, shooting 25/25 and 24/25 at the two starting rounds, but then went on to close Day 1 on September 22 with a low 22/25. Despite his efforts in Day 2 where he recorded two sets of 24/25, Achilleos finished in 23rd place with 119/125. Ten shooters tied at 122/125 for the remaining three spots in the final, amongst them fellow Cypriot Antonakis Andreou, who went on to take 8th place.

=== Athens 2004 ===
Four years later, a now experienced Achilleos went to the Greek capital as one of the best young shooters in Skeet. He was the national flag barer at the Opening Ceremony at the OAKA stadium. The Cypriot delegation received a standing ovation by the mostly Greek crowd, due to the islands’ ties to Greece. George then set his eyes on the skeet event, which was held at the Markopoulo Shooting Centre on 21 and 22 August.

After shooting 24, 24 and then 25, Achilleos closed day 1 tied in 8th place with 73/75. Day 2 started with a 23/25 could seriously affect his hopes for the final. He closed the day with a perfect 25/25 to finish up in 9th place, just one disc away from the shoot-off.

=== Beijing 2008 ===
Achilleos went into the 2008 Summer Olympics in Beijing, China as the favorite for the gold medal, since he was world No1 in ISSF's rankings and the reigning World Champion. Due to his international successes, Achilleos was chosen for a second consecutive Olympiad to carry the flag at the Opening Ceremony, this time in the Bird's Nest of the Chinese capital.

A week later (15 and 16 August) the skeet event was set to take place and all Cypriot eyes were on the Beijing Shooting Range. Then President of the Republic of Cyprus, Mr. Demetris Christofias and former President Tassos Papadopoulos were also in attendance, hoping to witness Cyprus’ first ever Olympic medal.

Day 1 started bad for Achilleos, who shot 23, 24 and 23 for a total of 70/75. But with only nine shooters having better ranking after day 1, including four athletes with 71/75, the road to the final was still open. And George didn't disappoint on day 2. He started with a perfect 25/25 and closed the day with 24/25, which put him on 5th position (119/125). Fellow Cypriot Antonis Nikolaides also finished the qualification round in the top 6, with a score of 120/125, giving Cyprus its first ever double Olympic final participation in any event.

In what was expected to be an historic day for Cyprus, turned out to become one of Cyprus most painful. Achilleos recorded 24/25 in the final, which kept him in 5th position with a total of 143, just one disc shy of the bronze medal shoot off. Nikolaides also had 24/25 in the final, but went on to lose the medal shoot-off against Anthony Terras of France, settling for a 4th position. The 4th and 5th position by Nikolaides and Achilleos respectively is to date (as of 2017) Cyprus’ second and third best placing in the Olympics, following the silver medal of sailor Pavlos Kontides in London four years later.

=== London 2012 ===
Achilleos returned for his fourth Olympic appearance -a tied record for the island as of 2017. Although being the top finisher four years earlier, George didn't carry the flag at the Opening Ceremony since the skeet event was scheduled just three days later and he opted not to attend the Opening Ceremony. Tennis star Marcos Baghdatis was chosen to carry the flag.

The competition on day 1 at the Royal Artillery Barracks started negatively for Achilleos, with a 23 and a 22-round keeping him well below the top six. The Cypriot closed the day with a 24/25. On day 2 Achilleos was improved with a total of 49/50, but the 118 mark was two discs below the needed score to qualify for the final, finishing in 11th position.

== Shooting competitions ==
=== World Championships ===
The most important annual shooting event organized by the ISSF is the World Championships, an event in which George has won four medals as a Senior as of 2017, making him just one of a handful of Cypriot athletes who have won medals in senior world championships. The gold medal in the Nicosia 2007 World Championship is Achilleos’ biggest accomplishment, with three more medals coming in Maribor 2009, Munich 2010 and Moscow 2017.

=== World Cup ===
As of 2017 George Achilleos is the most medaled skeet shooter still active in the world, with a total of 15 podiums in World Cups. He has won six gold all in the span between 2007 and 2012. His first World Cup medal came in 2000 in Lonato, Italy, while his latest (as of 2017) came in the "home court" of Larnaca in 2017.

George has also won three medals in World Cup Finals. A gold in 2007, and bronze in 2005 and 2009.

=== Other events ===
Including the World Championships, World Cups and World Cup Finals, Achilleos has stepped on the podium in eight different international main events. The Cypriot skeet shooter has won medals in European Championships, Commonwealth Games, Mediterranean Games, European Games and even in the bi-annual Games of the Small States of Europe, a multisport event which is attended by European countries of one million population and below.

== World Records ==
As of 2017, Achilleos is the only Cypriot to have set a World Record in an Olympic sport, a feat that he managed more than once. Achilleos first equaled the World Record in skeet shooting in 2005 at Dubai, by shooting 124/125. He again equaled the World Record and currently shares the WR after scoring a perfect 125/125 in Larnaca in 2015.

Achilleos shot a perfect 125/125 two more times during domestic championships, although these particular events didn't count for a world record. These occurred in March 2011 at Paralimni and February 2015 in Larnaca.

== Honors and awards ==
As one of Cyprus’ most medaled athletes internationally in all sports since the beginning of the 21st century, Achilleos has been selected twice (2007, 2010) as the island's top athlete by the Cyprus Sports Writers Union. The particular ceremony (which takes place since the 80s) is considered as the most prestigious sporting award in the country, with the President of the Republic traditionally the person who presents the award to the best Cypriot athlete of the year. Besides winning top accolade twice, Achilleos has the record of most appearances in the top 5; 13 straight times with the run coming to an end at the 2017 event.

Achilleos was selected as the flag bearer of Cyprus for the opening ceremony of the 2014 Commonwealth Games in Glasgow at Celtic Park.

== Equipment and sponsors ==
Achilleos is one of Beretta's international sporting personalities. As of 2017 the Cypriot shooter uses the DT11 Black Edition from Beretta. Achilleos travels each year after the end of the season to the Beretta factory in Brescia, Italy for modifications to his weapons.

OPAP Cyprus has been a long time sponsor for Achilleos, with their partnership continuing since 2007. Olympia is George's official cartridge provider while adidas is a supporter.

== Personal life ==
Achilleos is married and has two children, a son born in 2006 and a second son born in 2014.

== See also ==
- Cyprus at the Olympic Games
- Cyprus' Olympic Flag Bearers

Olympic Games
Preceded by Antonakis Andreou	Flagbearer for Cyprus; Athens 2004	Succeeded by Georgios Achilleos
Olympic Games
Preceded by Georgios Achilleos	Flagbearer for Cyprus; Beijing 2008	Succeeded by Marcos Baghdatis
