= Sailing at the 2023 Pan American Games – Women's iQFoil =

Women's IQFoil at the 2023 Pan American Games
- Venue: Cofradia Nautica del Pacifico
- Dates: October 28 - November 3
- Competitors: 10 from 9 nations

Medalists
Gold medal	Mariana Aguilar	Mexico
Silver medal	Dominique Stater	United States
Bronze medal	Demita Vega	Mexico

The women's IQFoil competition of the sailing events at the 2023 Pan American Games in Santiago was held from October 28 to November 3 at the Cofradia Nautica del Pacifico.

Points were assigned based on the finishing position in each race (1 for first, 2 for second, etc.). The points were totaled from the top 13 results of the first 16 races, with lower totals being better. If a sailor was disqualified or did not complete the race, 11 points were assigned for that race (as there were 10 sailors in this competition). The top sailor at that point competed in the final race, while the second and third in the semi-final and the others in the quarter-final.

Mariana Aguilar from Mexico dominated the preliminary regatta and the final race to claim the gold medal. Dominique Stater from the United States was the third in the preliminary phase and won the semi-final to reach the final race, where she finished second. Demita Vega from Mexico received the bronze medal.

== Schedule ==
All times are (UTC-3).

Date	Time	Round
October 28, 2023	13:15	Races 1, 2, 3 and 4
October 30, 2023	15:16	Races 5, 6, 7, 8 and 9
October 31, 2023	13:13	Races 10, 11, 12 and 13
November 2, 2023	13:00	Races 14, 15 and 16
November 3, 2023	15:09	Quarter-final
November 3, 2023	16:03	Semi-final
November 3, 2023	16:23	Final

== Results ==
The results were as below.
Race M is the medal race.

Rank	Athlete	Nation	Race																			Total Points	Net Points
Rank	Athlete	Nation	1	2	3	4	5	6	7	8	9	10	11	12	13	14	15	16	QF	SF	F	Total Points	Net Points
1st place, gold medalist(s)	Mariana Aguilar	Mexico	1	1	1	(3)	(2)	1	2	2	2	(3)	1	1	2	1	1	1	—N/a	—N/a	1	25	17
2nd place, silver medalist(s)	Dominique Stater	United States	(4)	3	3	(4)	3	(4)	3	3	3	1	4	2	3	2	3	3	—N/a	1	2	48	36
3rd place, bronze medalist(s)	Demita Vega	Mexico	3	5	(6)	2	5	(6)	6	5	5	5	(7)	6	6	6	5	6	1	2	3	84	65
4	Chiara Ferretti	Argentina	6	6	5	6	(11); DNF	5	(7)	6	6	(7)	5	4	7	4	4	4	2	3	—N/a	93	68
5	María Belén Bazo	Peru	2	2	2	1	1	2	1	1	1	2	(3)	(3)	1	(3)	2	2	—N/a	4	—N/a	29	20
6	Bruna Martinelli	Brazil	(5)	4	4	5	4	3	4	4	4	4	2	(7)	4	5	(6)	5	3	—N/a	—N/a	70	52
7	Carenys González	Venezuela	(11); DNF	(11); DNF	(11); DNF	11; DNF	6	7	5	7	11; DNF	6	6	5	5	7	7	8	4	—N/a	—N/a	124	91
8	Matilde Pavone	Chile	(11); DNF	(11); DNF	(11); DNF	11; DNF	11; DNF	11; DNF	11; DNF	11; DNF	11; DNS	11; DNF	9	11; DNF	9	11; DNF	11; DNF	11; DNF	5	—N/a	—N/a	172	139
9	Rebecca Heller	Canada	(11); DNF	(11); DNF	(11); DNF	11; DNF	11; DNF	11; DNF	11; DNF	11; DNF	11; DNS	9 STP	8	11; DNF	9 STP	11; DNF	8	7	6	—N/a	—N/a	162	129
10	Yaimary Cervantes	Cuba	(11); DNS	(11); DNF	(11); DNF	11; DNF	11; DNF	11; DNF	11; DNF	11; DNS	11; DNS	11; DNC	11; DNC	11; DNC	11; DNC	11; DNC	11; DNC	11; DNC	7	—N/a	—N/a	176	143
