= Marina Zarma =

Cypriot swimmer (born 1978)

Personal information
- Born: 11 May 1978 (age 48)

Sport
- Sport: Swimming

Marina Zarma (born 11 May 1978) is a Cypriot swimmer. She competed in the women's 200 metre freestyle and women's 400 metre freestyle events at the 1996 Summer Olympics.
