= Valeriy Shomin =

Valery Kimovich Shomin (born 31 July 1971, in Moscow, Soviet Union) is a sport shooter who has thrice represented Russia at the Summer Olympics.

At the 2004 Summer Olympics in Athens he participated in the men's skeet event, finishing tied for 15th position. At the 2008 Games in Beijing he finished 19th in the men's skeet. At the 2012 Games he finished 4th in the men's skeet.
