= Kyriakos Dimosthenous =

Cypriot swimmer (born 1980)

Personal information
- Full name: Kyriakos Dimosthenous
- National team: Cyprus
- Born: 4 March 1980 (age 46)
- Height: 1.76 m (5 ft 9 in)
- Weight: 72 kg (159 lb)

Sport
- Sport: Swimming
- Strokes: Breaststroke

Kyriakos Dimosthenous (Greek: Κυριάκος Δημοσθένους; born March 4, 1980) is a Cypriot former swimmer, who specialized in breaststroke events. Dimosthenous qualified for the men's 100 m breaststroke at the 2004 Summer Olympics in Athens, by achieving a FINA B-standard of 1:04.74 from the Greek Open Championships in Piraeus. He challenged seven other swimmers in heat three, including 15-year-old Nguyen Huu Viet of Vietnam. He edged out Estonia's Aleksander Baldin to take a sixth spot by a tenth of a second (0.10) with a time of 1:05.54. Dimosthenous failed to advance into the semifinals, as he placed forty-sixth overall out of 60 swimmers on the first day of preliminaries.
