= Farrah Hall =

American windsurfer (born 1981)

Personal information
- Born: November 1, 1981 (age 45) Annapolis, Maryland, U.S.
- Height: 5 ft 7 in (170 cm) (2012)
- Weight: 127 lb (58 kg) (2012)

Sailing career
- Sport: Sailing
Medal record
Sailing
Representing United States
Pan American Games
Bronze medal – third place	2011 Guadalajara	Women's RS:X

Farrah Hall (born November 1, 1981, in Annapolis, Maryland) is an American sports sailor. She competes in RS:X, a windsurfing discipline.

Hall graduated from Broadneck High School in Annapolis in 1999 and from St. Mary's College of Maryland in 2003 with a B.A. in biology.

At the 2012 Summer Olympics, she competed in the women's sailboard (RS:X). She finished 20th.

She has qualified to represent the United States at the 2020 Summer Olympics.
