= Patrícia Freitas =

Brazilian windsurfer

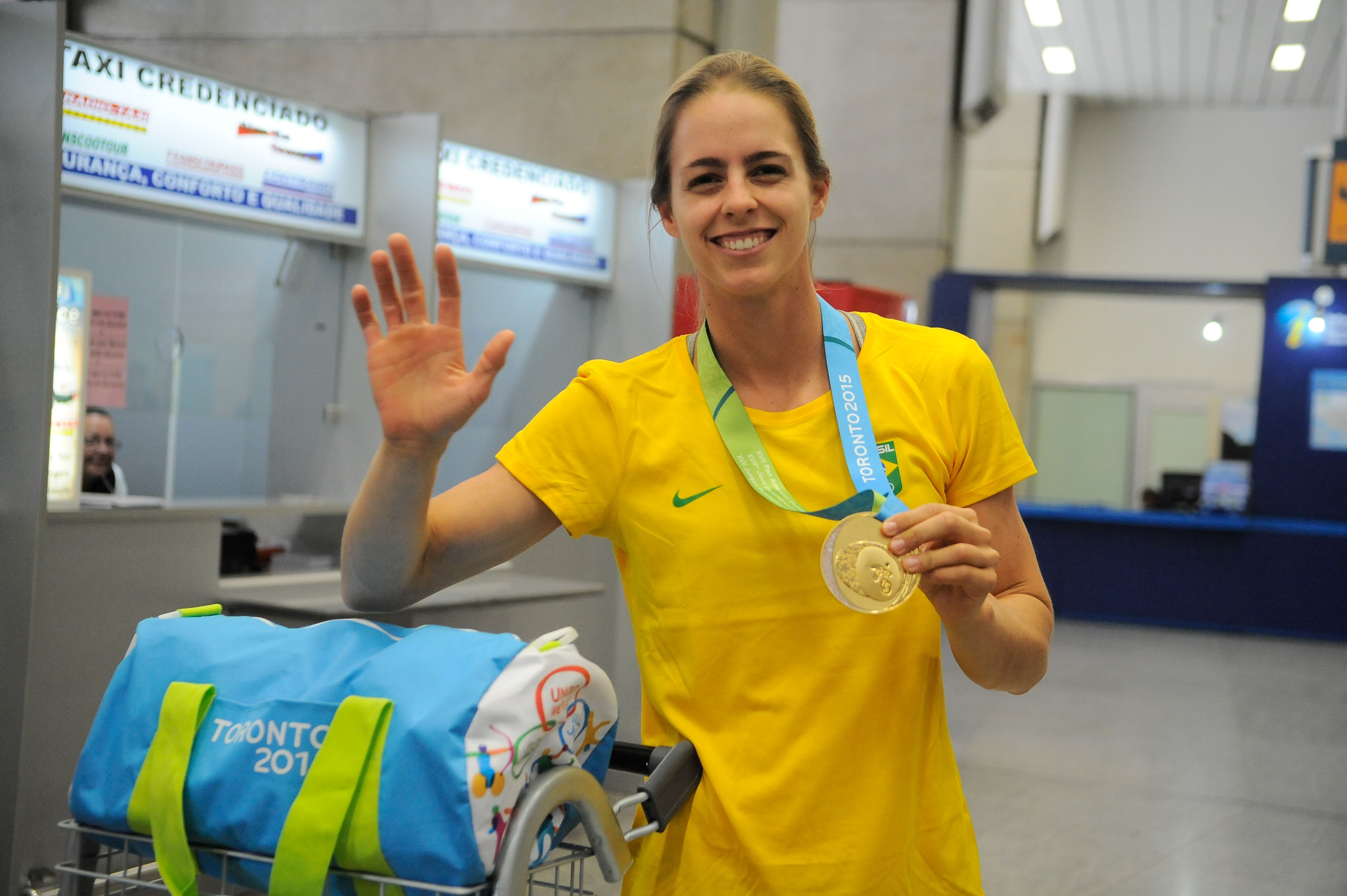
- Freitas in 2015

Personal information
- Full name: Patrícia da Costa Freitas
- Nickname: Paty
- Nationality: American - Brazilian
- Born: 10 March 1990 (age 36) Washington, District of Columbia, U.S.
- Height: 1.72 m (5 ft 8 in) (2012)
- Weight: 58 kg (128 lb) (2012)

Sailing career
- Sport: Sailing
- Club: Iate Clube do Rio de Janeiro
- Coached by: Lucas Souza
- Class: Sailboard
Medal record
Sailing
Representing Brazil
Pan American Games
Gold medal – first place	2011 Guadalajara	Women's RS:X
Gold medal – first place	2015 Toronto	Women's RS:X
Gold medal – first place	2019 Lima	Women's RS:X

Patrícia da Costa Freitas (born 10 March 1990) is an American-born Brazilian windsurfer, who specialized in Neil Pryde RS:X class. She represented Brazil in three editions of the Olympic Games (2008, 2012 and 2016) and captured her first ever individual title in her sailing career at the 2011 Pan American Games in Guadalajara, Mexico. Holding dual citizenship between Brazil and the United States, Freitas currently resides in Rio de Janeiro, where she sails and trains for the Rio de Janeiro Yacht Club (Portuguese: Iate Clube do Rio de Janeiro) under her personal coach and mentor Lucas Souza. As of September 2013, Freitas is ranked as one of the top ten sailors in the world for the sailboard class by the International Sailing Federation, following her successes at the South American and World Championships in her home nation.

Freitas made her official debut at the 2008 Summer Olympics in Beijing, where she placed eighteenth in the newly introduced RS:X class with a net score of 135 points.

At the 2011 Pan American Games in Guadalajara, Freitas dominated the races with a remarkable grade of 12 to claim the gold medal in the women's sailboard class, edging out the host nation's Demita Vega by a 16-point gap.

The following year, Freitas competed for her second Brazilian team in the RS:X class at the 2012 Summer Olympics in London by receiving a berth from her result at the ISAF Sailing World Championships in Perth, Western Australia. Struggling to attain a higher position during the early stages, Freitas managed to pull off a second and an eighth-place finish in the final legs but missed a chance to succeed for the medal race with a fourteenth-place effort and a net score of 110 points. At the 2012 Summer Olympics, she finished in 13th place.

She qualified again for her home Olympics in Rio 2016 and finished 8th at those Games.

She represented Brazil at the 2020 Summer Olympics.
