= Dimitrios Lappas =

Cypriot windsurfer (born 1972)

Personal information
- Nationality: Cypriot
- Born: 18 December 1972 (age 53)

Sport
- Sport: Windsurfing

Dimitrios Lappas (also spelled Demetris, born 18 December 1972) is a Cypriot windsurfer. He competed at the 1996 Summer Olympics and the 2000 Summer Olympics.
