= Andri Avraam =

Cypriot long-distance runner (born 1963)

Personal information
- Full name: Andrea Avraam
- Nationality: Cypriot
- Born: 20 January 1963 (age 63)

Sport
- Sport: Long-distance running
- Event: 3000 metres

Andrea Avraam (Greek: Άντρη Αβραάμ; born 20 January 1963) is a Cypriot long-distance runner. She competed in the women's 3000 metres at the 1988 Summer Olympics.
