= Petros Elton =

Cypriot sailor (born 1971)

Personal information
- Nationality: Cypriot
- Born: 20 April 1971 (age 53)

Sport
- Sport: Sailing

Petros Elton (born 20 April 1971) is a Cypriot sailor. He competed at the 1992 Summer Olympics and the 1996 Summer Olympics.
