= Gavriella Chatzidamianou =

Cypriot windsurfer (born 1986)

Personal information
- Nationality: Cyprus
- Born: 30 June 1986 (age 40)
- Height: 1.73 m (5 ft 8 in)
- Weight: 60 kg (132 lb)

Sailing career
- Sport: Sailing
- Club: Kerynia Nautica Club
- Class: Sailboard

Gavriella Chatzidamianou or Gabriella Hadjidamianou (also Giavrella Khatzidamianou, Greek: Γιαβριέλλα Χατζηδαμιανού; born 30 June 1986) is a Cypriot windsurfer, who specialized in the Mistral and RS:X classes. As of March 2008, she is ranked no. 57 in the world for her associated class by the International Sailing Federation.

At age eighteen, Chatzidamianou made her official debut for the 2004 Summer Olympics in Athens, where she placed twenty-first in the women's Mistral sailboard class by two points larger of her record from Latvia's Vita Matise, attaining a net score of 195.

Four years after competing in her last Olympics, Chatzidamianou qualified for her second Cypriot team, as a 22-year-old, at the 2008 Summer Olympics in Beijing, by finishing sixty-first from the RS:X World Championships in Auckland, New Zealand. She finished again in twenty-first place in the preliminary races of the women's RS:X class by three points ahead of Hungary's Diana Detre, lowering her net score to 182.
