= Antonis Nikolaidis =

Cypriot sport shooter

Personal information
- Nationality: Cyprus
- Born: 24 January 1967 (age 59) Islington, Greater London, Great Britain
- Height: 1.70 m (5 ft 7 in)
- Weight: 82 kg (181 lb)

Sport
- Sport: Shooting
- Event: Skeet (SK125)
- Coached by: Petr Malek
Medal record
Men's shooting
Representing Cyprus
Commonwealth Games
Gold medal – first place	1998 Kuala Lumpur	SK125 (pairs)
Gold medal – first place	2002 Manchester	SK125 (pairs)
Gold medal – first place	2006 Melbourne	SK125 (pairs)
Bronze medal – third place	2002 Manchester	SK125
Games of the Small States of Europe
Gold medal – first place	2003 Malta	Skeet

Antonis Nikolaidis (Greek: Αντώνης Νικολαϊδης; born 24 January 1967 in Islington, Greater London, Great Britain) is a British-born Cypriot sport shooter. He captured a total of seven medals (three silver and four bronze) in men's skeet shooting at the ISSF World Cup series, and shared titles with Costas Stratis at the 1998 Commonwealth Games and with Georgios Achilleos in the doubles at the 2002 Commonwealth Games and 2006 Commonwealth Games. Nikolaidis also competed for Cyprus in the same discipline in three editions of the Olympic Games (1992, 1996, and 2004), but he neither reached the final round, nor claimed an Olympic medal.

Sixteen years after competing in his first Olympics, Nikolaidis qualified for his fourth Cypriot team, as a 41-year-old, at the 2008 Summer Olympics in Beijing, by placing second from the 2007 ISSF World Cup series in Changwon, South Korea. He had finished on exactly the same score of 144 targets (120 in the preliminary rounds and 24 in the final) as France's Anthony Terras in men's skeet shooting, but narrowly lost the nation's first ever Olympic medal in a shoot-off by one point for a bonus of two.

== Olympic results ==
Olympic results
Event	1992	1996	2004	2008
Skeet	25th 145	26th 118	21st 119	4th 120+24
