= Andreas Cariolou =

Cypriot windsurfer (born 1982)

Personal information
- Native name: Ανδρέας Φεοβος Καριόλου
- Full name: Andreas Pheobus Kariolou
- Nationality: Cyprus
- Born: 24 November 1982 (age 43) Engomi, Cyprus
- Height: 1.81 m (5 ft 11 in)
- Weight: 73 kg (161 lb)

Sailing career
- Sport: Sailing
- Club: Kyrenia Nautical Club
- Class: Sailboard

Andreas Pheobus Kariolou (Greek: Ανδρέας Φεοβος Καριόλου; born 24 November 1982) is a five-time Olympic windsurfer from Cyprus, racing for Kyrenia Nautical Club

He accomplished thirteenth-place finishes at the 2004 Summer Olympics in Athens, and at the 2008 Summer Olympics in Beijing, closely missing qualification into the medal race. At his third Olympics in London, Cariolou improved further in the men's event, but suffered a few bad races, which affected his position in the overall rankings, and ultimately ended up in seventeenth place. In Rio 2016 Olympics he was again close to the top 10 mid championship, but he ended in 19th place.

After some time off, he returned to action in 2017 with a 16th place at the European Championship. In September 2019 he qualified for his 5th Olympic Games, which is an all-time record for Cyprus, being the first athlete from the island-nation to qualify for five Olympic Games.

A few highlights from his career:

3rd place World Championship-2005 - Italy

6th place European Championship 2011- Bulgaria

8th place- Sailing World Cup final 2019- France

Multiple medals in Athens Eurolymp sailing weeks

Multiple times finalist in World Sailing Cup events

14 consecutive years National champion
