= List of flag bearers for Cyprus at the Olympics =

Cyprus at the Olympics
- IOC code: CYP
- NOC: Cyprus Olympic Committee
- Website: www.olympic.org.cy (in Greek and English)
- Medals: Gold 0 Silver 2 Bronze 0 Total 2

Summer appearances
- 1980; 1984; 1988; 1992; 1996; 2000; 2004; 2008; 2012; 2016; 2020; 2024

Winter appearances
- 1980; 1984; 1988; 1992; 1994; 1998; 2002; 2006; 2010; 2014; 2018; 2022; 2026

This is a list of flag bearers who have represented Cyprus at the Olympics.

Flag bearers carry the national flag of their country at the opening ceremony of the Olympic Games.

#	Event year	Season	Flag bearer	Sport	Ref.
1	1980	Winter	Andreas Pilavakis	Alpine skiing	
2	1980	Summer	Kostas Papakostas	Judo	
3	1984	Winter	Alexis Fotiadis	Alpine skiing	
4	1984	Summer	Marios Kassianidis	Athletics	
5	1988	Winter	Karolina Fotiadou	Alpine skiing	
6	1988	Summer	Mikhalakis Tymbios	Skeet shooting	
7	1992	Winter	Sokratis Aristodimou	Alpine skiing	
8	1992	Summer	Marios Hadjiandreou	Athletics	
9	1994	Winter	Karolina Fotiadou	Alpine skiing	
10	1996	Summer	Anninos Marcoullides	Athletics	
11	1998	Winter	Andreas Vasili	Alpine skiing	
12	2000	Summer	Antonakis Andreou	Skeet shooting	
13	2002	Winter	Theodoros Christodoulou	Alpine skiing	
14	2004	Summer	Georgios Achilleos	Skeet shooting	
15	2006	Winter	Theodoros Christodoulou	Alpine skiing	
16	2008	Summer	Georgios Achilleos	Skeet shooting	
17	2010	Winter	Christopher Papamichalopoulos	Alpine skiing	
18	2012	Summer	Marcos Baghdatis	Tennis	
19	2014	Winter	Constantinos Papamichael	Alpine skiing	
20	2016	Summer	Pavlos Kontides	Sailing	
21	2018	Winter	Dinos Lefkaritis	Alpine skiing	
22	2020	Summer	Andri Eleftheriou	Shooting	
22	2020	Summer	Pavlos Kontides	Sailing	
23	2022	Winter	Yianno Kouyoumdjian	Alpine skiing	
24	2024	Summer	Elena Kulichenko	Athletics	
24	2024	Summer	Milan Trajkovic	Athletics	

== See also ==
- Cyprus at the Olympics
