= Athletics at the Games of the Small States of Europe =

Athletics is one of the sports at the biennial Games of the Small States of Europe. Athletics competitions have been held at every edition of the games since 1985 and is one of the eight core sports of the games.

== Editions ==
Games	Year	Host city	Host country	Dates	Events
1	1985	City of San Marino	San Marino	23–26 May	
2	1987	Monaco City	Monaco	14–17 May	
3	1989	Nicosia	Cyprus	17–20 May	
4	1991	Andorra la Vella	Andorra	21–25 May	
5	1993	Valletta	Malta	25–29 May	
6	1995	Luxembourg City	Luxembourg	29 May – 3 June	
7	1997	Reykjavík	Iceland	2–7 June	
8	1999	Vaduz	Liechtenstein	24–29 May	
9	2001	City of San Marino	San Marino	29 May – 2 June	
10	2003	Valletta	Malta	2–7 June	
11	2005	Andorra la Vella	Andorra	30 May – 4 June	
12	2007	Monaco City	Monaco	4–9 June	
13	2009	Nicosia	Cyprus	1–6 June	
14	2011	Schaan	Liechtenstein	30 May – 4 June	
15	2013	Luxembourg City	Luxembourg	27 May – 1 June	
16	2015	Reykjavík	Iceland	27 May – 1 June	
17	2017	City of San Marino	San Marino	29 May – 3 June	
18	2019	Budva	Montenegro	27 May – 1 June	
19	2021	Andorra la Vella	Andorra	Future event	
20	2023	Valletta	Malta	Future event	
21	2025	Monaco City	Monaco	Future event	

== See also ==
- List of Games of the Small States of Europe records in athletics
