= San Marino national shooting team =

The San Marino national shooting team represent the Republic of San Marino in International shooting competitions such as Olympic Games or World shooting Championships. It provided the highest results in Olympic sports for the small country.

== History ==
Shooting in San Marino is controlled by Federazione Sammarinese Tiro a Volo(for shotgun events) and Federazione Sammarinese Tiro a Segno (for rifle and pistol). National shooting team was present in every Olympic Games, in which San Marino have competed (13 participation).

The nation, that have never won an olympic medal, has reached its highest result thanks to a shooting event: Alessandra Perilli's fourth place in Women's trap at London 2012.

San Marino won, indeed, many medals in shooting events at Mediterranean Games and Games of the Small States of Europe, especially thanks to its shotgun athletes.

== Results ==
Event	Total			
Event	Gold medal	Silver medal	Bronze medal	Tot.
Olympic Games	0	0	0	0
World Championships	0	0	4	4
Mediterranean Games	1	4	1	6
Games of the Small States of Europe	13	7	15	35

=== Olympic Games ===
San Marino reached its best olympic results in shooting: Alessandra Perilli was fourth in Women's Trap in 2012 after an unlucky shoot-off, Emanuela Felici was seventh in the same discipline at Sydney 2000 and Athens 2004, Francesco Amici was seventh in Men's Trap at Athens 2004, while Daniela Del Din was fifteenth in Women's Trap at Beijing 2008.

=== World Championships ===
San Marino gained four bronze medals in ISSF World Shooting Championships.

Francesco Amici was third in Men's Trap in 1995 World Championships in Nicosia, Cyprus. Daniela Del Din repeated the same result in 2007 World Championships, in Nicosia again. Men and women teams won two bronze medal in 2010 Championships, in Munich.

- 1995 Nicosia, Cyprus
  - Francesco Amici (Men's Trap)
- 2007 Nicosia, Cyprus
  - Daniela Del Din (Women's Trap)
- 2010 Munich, Germany
  - Men's team trap
  - Women's team trap

=== Mediterranean Games ===
Shooting provided six medals to San Marino in Mediterranean Games.

In 1987 Gian Nicola Berti won the first medal for San Marino with his second place in Men's Trap. Stefano Selva repeated the same result in 1993 games. More recently, in 2005 Daniela Del Din won the first female medal thanks to a second place in Women's Trap, while in 2009 Games the national shooting team gained three medals: gold for Daniela Del Din, silver for Alessandra Perilli and bronze for Francesco Amici, always in trap events.

- 1987 Latakia, Syria
  - Gian Nicola Berti (Men's Trap)
- 1987 Languedoc-Roussillon, France
  - Stefano Selva(Men's Trap)
- 2005 Almeria, Spain
  - Daniela Del Din(Women's Trap)
- 2009 Pescara, Italy
  - Daniela Del Din(Women's Trap)
  - Alessandra Perilli(Women's Trap)
  - Francesco Amici (Men's Trap)

=== Games of the Small States of Europe ===
San Marino won 35 medals in shooting events at Games of the Small States. In detail:

- 1987 Monaco
  - Gian Nicola Berti (Men's Trap)
- 1989 Cyprus
  - Francesco Amici (Men's Trap)
  - Alfio Tomassoni (Men's Trap)
  - Adriano Felici (Men's Skeet)
- 1991 Andorra
  - Alfio Tomassoni (Men's Trap)
  - Adriano Felici (Men's Skeet)
- 1993 Malta
  - Alfio Tomassoni (Men's Trap)
  - Maurizio Zonzini (Men's Double Trap)
  - Adriano Felici (Men's Skeet)
- 1995 Luxembourg
  - Francesco Amici (Men's Trap)
  - Davide Chiaruzzi (Men's 10 mt. pistol)
  - Maurizio Zonzini (Men's Double Trap)
- 1997 Iceland
  - Francesco Amici (Men's Trap)
  - Maurizio Zonzini (Men's Double Trap)
  - Moreno Benedettini (Men's Skeet)
  - Stefano Selva (Men's Trap)
- 2001 San Marino
  - Francesco Amici (Men's Trap)
  - Nadia Marchi (Women's 10 mt. pistol)
  - Moreno Benedettini (Men's Skeet)
  - Stefano Selva (Men's Trap)
- 2003 Malta
  - Francesco Amici (Men's Trap)
  - Marcello Massaro (Men's 10 mt. pistol)
  - Maurizio Zonzini (Men's Double Trap)
  - Nadia Marchi (Women's 10 mt. pistol)
  - Erika Ghiotti (Women's 10 mt. rifle)
  - Mirko Bugli (Men's 10 mt. pistol)
- 2005 Andorra
  - Francesco Amici (Men's Trap)
  - Moreno Benedettini (Men's Skeet)
  - Nadia Marchi (Women's 10 mt. pistol)
- 2009 Cyprus
  - Alfio Tomassoni (Men's Trap)
  - Daniela Del Din (Women's Trap)
  - Alessandra Perilli (Women's Trap)
  - Mirko Bugli (Men's 10 mt. pistol)
  - Maurizio Zonzini (Men's Double Trap)
- 2011 Liechtenstein
  - Mirko Bugli (Men's 10 mt. pistol)

== See also ==
- San Marino at the Olympics
