= Andorra men's national volleyball team =

National sports team

Andorra
- Association: Andorran Volleyball Federation (FAV)
- Confederation: CEV

Uniforms
Home	Away
- fav.ad (in Catalan)

The Andorra men's national volleyball team is the national team of Andorra.

== Results ==
=== European Volleyball Championship of the Small Countries Division ===
Year	Pos	Pld	W	L
(Malta) 2000	Did not enter			
(Andorra) 2002	6th	5	1	4
(Luxembourg) 2004	5th	4	0	4
(Cyprus) 2007	2nd place, silver medalist(s)	3	1	2
(Luxembourg) 2009	Did not enter			
(Andorra) 2011	3rd place, bronze medalist(s)	4	2	2
(Cyprus) 2013	Did not enter			
(Luxembourg) 2015	Did not enter			
(Iceland) 2017	Did not enter			

=== Games of the Small States of Europe ===
Year	Pos	Pld	W	L
(Monaco) 1987	4th			
(Cyprus) 1989	7th			
(Andorra) 1991	7th			
(Malta) 1993	7th			
(Luxembourg) 1995	2nd place, silver medalist(s)			
(Iceland) 1997	3rd place, bronze medalist(s)			
(Liechtenstein) 1999	5th			
(San Marino) 2001	4th			
(Malta) 2003	4th	5	2	3
(Andorra) 2005	2nd place, silver medalist(s)	4	3	1
(Monaco) 2007	4th	5	2	3
(Cyprus) 2009	2nd place, silver medalist(s)	4	3	1
(Liechtenstein) 2011	6th	5	0	5
(Luxembourg) 2013	Did not enter			
(Iceland) 2015	Did not enter			
(San Marino) 2017	Did not enter			
(Montenegro) 2019	Did not enter			
