= Diego Mularoni =

Sammarinese swimmer

Personal information
- Full name: Diego Mularoni
- National team: San Marino
- Born: 27 November 1979 (age 46)
- Height: 1.77 m (5 ft 10 in)
- Weight: 76 kg (168 lb)

Sport
- Sport: Swimming
- Strokes: Freestyle
Medal record
Men's swimming
Representing San Marino
Games of the Small States of Europe
Gold medal – first place	1999 Vaduz	400 m freestyle
Gold medal – first place	1999 Vaduz	1500 m freestyle
Gold medal – first place	2001 San Marino	400 m freestyle
Gold medal – first place	2001 San Marino	1500 m freestyle
Gold medal – first place	2003 Valletta	400 m freestyle
Gold medal – first place	2003 Valletta	1500 m freestyle
Silver medal – second place	1997 Reykjavík	1500 m freestyle
Silver medal – second place	1999 Vaduz	200 m freestyle
Silver medal – second place	2001 San Marino	100 m freestyle
Silver medal – second place	2001 San Marino	200 m freestyle
Silver medal – second place	2003 Valletta	200 m freestyle
Bronze medal – third place	2003 Valletta	100 m freestyle
Bronze medal – third place	2003 Valletta	4×200 m freestyle

Diego Mularoni (born November 27, 1979) is a Sammarinese former swimmer, who specialized in freestyle events. He is a three-time Olympian (1996, 2000, and 2004), and a current Sammarinese record holder in the 100, 200, 400, and 1500 m freestyle since 2001. He has won a total of 13 medals (six golds, five silver, and two bronze) at the Games of the Small States of Europe.

Mularoni made his official debut, as San Marino's only swimmer (aged 16), at the 1996 Summer Olympics in Atlanta. He failed to reach the top 16 final in the 100 m freestyle, finishing in fifty-ninth place with a time of 57.11.

In 1999, Mularoni reached his breakthrough in swimming, when he earned two gold medals each in the 400 and 1500 m freestyle at the Games of the Small States of Europe (GSSE) in Vaduz, Liechtenstein.

Mularoni also proved his strength in long-distance swimming at the 2000 Summer Olympics in Sydney, when he decided to compete in the 1500 m freestyle, which was later dominated by host nation Australia's Grant Hackett. Swimming in heat two, he rounded out a field of six swimmers to last place and thirty-ninth overall in 16:12.91.

When San Marino hosted the 2001 Games of the Small States of Europe in Serravalle, Mularoni managed to defend titles in the 400 m freestyle (3:56.73) and 1500 m freestyle (15:57.20). He also set two Sanmarinese records each to earn silver medals in the 100 m freestyle (52.83) and 200 m freestyle (1:53.70).

At the 2004 Summer Olympics in Athens, Mularoni was elected by the Sammarinese National Olympic Committee (Italian: Comitato Olimpico Nazionale Sammarinese), as San Marino's top swimmer, to be the flag bearer in the opening ceremony. He qualified only for the men's 200 m freestyle by clearing a FINA B-standard entry time of 1:53.87 from GSSE in Valletta, Malta. He challenged seven other swimmers in heat three, including 16-year-old Shaune Fraser of the Cayman Islands. He rounded out the field to last place by a 3.16-second margin behind winner Aleksandar Malenko of Macedonia in 1:56.18. Mularoni failed to advance into the semifinals, as he placed fifty-sixth overall in the preliminaries.
