= Cyprus at the 1992 Winter Olympics =

- IOC code: CYP
- NOC: Cyprus Olympic Committee
- Website: www.olympic.org.cy (in Greek and English)

in Albertville
- Competitors: 5 (4 men, 1 woman) in 1 sport
- Flag bearer: Sokratis Aristodimou (alpine skiing)
- Medals: Gold 0 Silver 0 Bronze 0 Total 0

Winter Olympics appearances (overview)
- 1980; 1984; 1988; 1992; 1994; 1998; 2002; 2006; 2010; 2014; 2018; 2022; 2026

Cyprus was represented at the 1992 Winter Olympics in Albertville, France by the Cyprus Olympic Committee.

In total, five athletes represented Cyprus, all in the alpine skiing events.

== Competitors ==
In total, five athletes represented Cyprus at the 1992 Winter Olympics in Albertville, France in one sport.

Sport	Men	Women	Total
Alpine skiing	4	1	5
Total	4	1	5

== Alpine skiing ==
Four Cypriot athletes participated in the alpine skiing events – Sokratis Aristodimou, Alekhis Fotiadis, Karolina Fotiadou and Andreas Vasili.

The men's super-G took place on 16 February 1992. Aristodimou completed the course in one minute 30.13 seconds to finish 80th overall. Fotiadis completed the course in one minute 30.31 seconds to finish 81st overall. Vasili completed the course in one minute 32.78 seconds to finish 84th overall.

The men's giant slalom took place on 18 February 1992. Aristodimou completed his first run in one minute 25.03 seconds and his second run in one minute 23.13 seconds for a combined time of two minutes 48.16 seconds to finish 76th overall. Fotiadis completed his first run in one minute 22.01 seconds and his second run in one minute 17.98 seconds for a combined time of two minutes 39.99 seconds to finish 61st overall. Vasili completed his first run in one minute 22.86 seconds and his second run in one minute 23.4 seconds for a combined time of two minutes 46.26 seconds to finish 69th overall.

The women's super-G also took place on 18 February 1992. Fotiadou did not start.

The women's giant slalom took place on 19 February 1992. Fotiadou completed her first run in one minute 28.66 seconds and her second run in one minute 28.48 seconds for a combined time of two minutes 57.14 seconds to finish 39th overall.

The women's slalom took place on 20 February 1992. Fotiadou completed her first run in one minute 6.13 seconds and her second run in 58.06 seconds for a combined time of two minutes 4.19 seconds to finish 35th overall.

The men's slalom took place on 22 February 1992. Aristodimou completed his first run in one minute 12.68 seconds and his second run in one minute 11.21 seconds for a combined time of two minutes 23.89 seconds to finish 47th overall. Fotiadis completed his first run in one minute 7.1 seconds and his second run in one minute 7.66 seconds for a combined time of two minutes 14.76 seconds to finish 44th overall. Vasili completed his first run in one minute 11.97 seconds and his second run in one minute 34.7 seconds for a combined time of two minutes 46.67 seconds to finish 55th overall. Haris Papacharalambous did not start.

Men

Athlete	Event	Race 1	Race 2	Total	
Athlete	Event	Time	Time	Time	Rank
Andreas Vasili	Super-G			1:32.78	84
Alekhis Fotiadis	Super-G			1:30.31	81
Sokratis Aristodimou	Super-G			1:30.13	80
Sokratis Aristodimou	Giant Slalom	1:25.03	1:23.13	2:48.16	76
Andreas Vasili	Giant Slalom	1:22.86	1:23.40	2:46.26	69
Alekhis Fotiadis	Giant Slalom	1:22.01	1:17.98	2:39.99	61
Sokratis Aristodimou	Slalom	1:12.68	1:11.21	2:23.89	47
Andreas Vasili	Slalom	1:11.97	1:34.70	2:46.67	55
Alekhis Fotiadis	Slalom	1:07.10	1:07.66	2:14.76	44

Women

Athlete	Event	Race 1	Race 2	Total	
Athlete	Event	Time	Time	Time	Rank
Karolina Fotiadou	Giant Slalom	1:28.66	1:28.48	2:57.14	39
Karolina Fotiadou	Slalom	1:06.13	58.06	2:04.19	35

== See also ==
- Official Olympic Reports
- Olympic Winter Games 1992, full results by sports-reference.com
