= Dinos Lefkaritis =

Cypriot alpine skier (born 1995)

Personal information
- Native name: Ντίνος Λευκαρίτης
- National team: Cyprus
- Born: March 30, 1995 (age 31) Larnaca, Cyprus
- Years active: 2008–present
- Height: 6 ft 0 in (183 cm)
- Weight: 176 lb (80 kg)

Sport
- Sport: Alpine skiing
- Events: Giant slalom, slalom
- Club: Nicosia Ski Club
Medal record
Men's alpine skiing
Representing the Republic of Cyprus
Event	1st	2nd	3rd
Small State Games	0	1	0
Total	0	1	0

Dinos Lefkaritis (Ancient Greek pronunciation: [Ντίνος Λευκαρίτης]; born March 30, 1995) is a Cypriot alpine skier who represented the Republic of Cyprus in the 2018 Winter Olympics in Pyeongchang, South Korea.

He was asked to compete in the 2014 Winter Olympics in Sochi, Russia, however, an injury prohibited him from competing; he was replaced by Constantinos Papamichael. Lefkaritis won the silver medal representing Cyprus in the 2017 Games of the Small States of Europe.

== Biography ==
Dinos Lefkaritis was born on March 30, 1995, in Larnaca, Cyprus. He began skiing at the age of 5 on the Troodos Mountains, a large mountain range on Mount Olympus, the highest point in Cyprus. He was named Junior Ski Athlete of the Year by the Cyprus Skiing Federation in 2011, 2013, and 2014.

He attended the American Academy of Larnaca from 2007 to 2014. He worked as a public relations officer for Cyprus's United Nations Youth and Student Association during his last year of secondary school. Lefkaritis speaks Greek, German, and English.

He attended Bates College in Lewiston, Maine where he double majored in engineering and economics. He graduated in 2019 While at university, he participates on their ski team and is counted among the college's 12 Olympians. He is the college's only male Alpine skier to compete in the Olympics. Lefkaritis withdrew temporarily from the college during the second semester of his third year to train for the Olympics. He trained with the Cyprus Skiing Federation on mountain ranges in Europe and South America.

== Career ==
=== Early career: 2008–2017 ===
He began competing for his home country in international competitions in 2008. Lefkaritis competed in the 2012 Winter Youth Olympic Games in Innsbruck. In 2013, he trained with Cyprus representatives in Ushuaia, Argentina before training for slalom racing in Cortina d'Ampezzo, Italy. After competing in the 2013 FIS Alpine World Ski Championships he sustained an injury (anterior cruciate ligament tear); he suspended training for three months to recover. In February 2015, he competed in the FIS Alpine World Ski Championships in Vail, Colorado. He was asked to compete in the 2014 Winter Olympics in Sochi, Russia, however, an injury prohibited him from competing; he was replaced by Constantinos Papamichael. Lefkaritis won the silver medal representing Cyprus in the 2017 Games of the Small States of Europe.

=== 2018 Winter Olympics ===
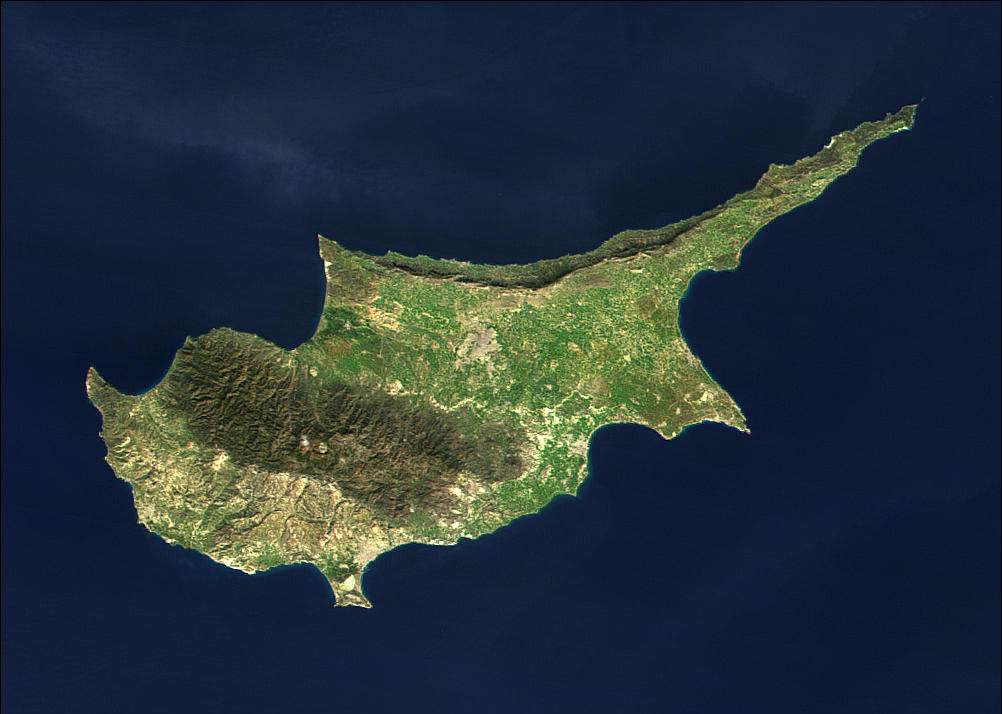
Lefkaritis represented the island of Cyprus during the 2018 Winter Olympics.

On January 22, 2018, Lefkaritis was officially ranked as the best alpine skier by the Cyprus Skiing Federation out of his ski club, Nicosia Ski Club. He was given the Olympic Solidarity Athlete Scholarship to assist him in preparing for the games. Lefkaritis was assigned the head coach of the national team–Milan Matic–to prepare him for his first event. The head of mission, who was also named Dinos Lefkaritis, is his father, and served as the president of their national ski federation. He reported to the Olympic Record that his alpine skiing inspiration was Austrian skier, Hermann Maier.

On February 9, 2018, he carried his country's flag during the Olympic opening ceremony. According to the official Olympic schedule, Lefkaritis was to ski in the men's giant slalom on February 18 and men's slalom on February 21, 2018. On Sunday, February 18, 10:15 AM, he skied in the Intermediate 1 section of men's giant slalom. He recorded a 19.06 min time in the section with a difference of +2.36; the time disqualified him from placing into the Intermediate 2 section of the competition. He needed an extra 2.85 seconds to qualify for the next round.

Due to inclement weather, the first and second runs of men's slalom were pushed to February 22 and relocated to the Yongpyong Alpine Centre. At approximately 10:00 AM, Dinos skied in the first run of the men's slalom. During the start of his run, a ski went out on Lefkaritis causing him to swerve into another line and fall near the top of the course. After negotiating eight gates, he ascended the course to restart his run. However, halfway up the course he stopped, yelled, and "[struck] his helmet with a hand in frustration". His run was one of 54 to be recorded as a "Did Not Finish (DNF)" as he did not restart and complete the course.

Lefkaritis carried the flag of Cyprus during the closing ceremonies of the Olympics on February 25, 2018. According to Balla.com.cy, Lefkaritis posted the following on Facebook on February 24: "The Olympics are a hell of an experience. They push you to face yourself in new ways. I learned a lot, I am really inspired and I am ready to work harder for more."

== See also ==
- Sport in Cyprus
- Cyprus at the Olympics
- Cyprus at the 2014 Winter Olympics
- Cyprus at the 2018 Winter Olympics
- Alpine skiing at the 2018 Winter Olympics
- List of Bates College people
