= Georgios Dimitriadis =

Cypriot swimmer (born 1981)

Personal information
- Full name: Georgios Dimitriadis
- National team: Cyprus
- Born: 29 June 1981 (age 45) Athens, Greece
- Height: 1.76 m (5 ft 9 in)
- Weight: 67 kg (148 lb)

Sport
- Sport: Swimming
- Strokes: Individual medley
Medal record
Men's swimming
Representing Cyprus
Games of the Small States of Europe
Silver medal – second place	2001 San Marino	200 m IM
Bronze medal – third place	2001 San Marino	400 m IM
2003 Games of the Small States of Europe
Silver medal – second place	2003 Malta	400 m IM
Bronze medal – third place	2003 Malta	200 m IM

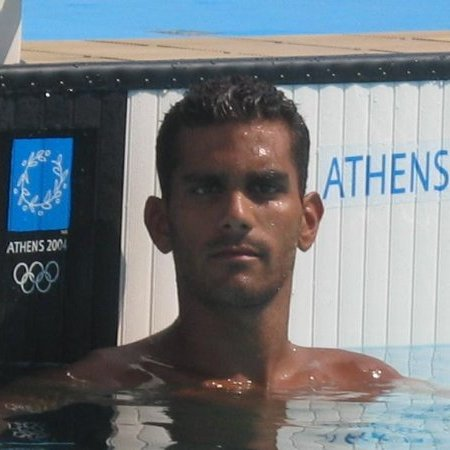
George Demetriades in 2014.

Georgios Dimitriadis (Greek: Γιώργος Δημητριάδης; born June 29, 1981) is a Cypriot former swimmer, who specialized in individual medley events. He is a two-time Olympian (2000 and 2004), and a former Cypriot record holder in the 200, and 400 m individual medley (25m pool) and 400 m individual medley (50m pool)

== International career ==
=== 2000 ===
Dimitriadis made his official debut with Cyprus at the 2000 Summer Olympics in Sydney, where he competed in the men's 200 m individual medley. Swimming in heat one, he picked up a fifth seed and fifty-third overall by a 4.88-second margin behind winner Andrei Pakin of Kyrgyzstan in 2:12.76.

=== 2001 ===
In 2001, Dimitriadis competed at 2001 Games of the Small States of Europe where he placed 3rd at 400 meters and 2nd at 200 meters Individual medley and 2nd at 4 X 200 freestyle relay

At the 2001 Mediterranean Games Dimitriadis competed at 400 metre individual medley placed 7th at the finals and 10th at 200 m individual medley. He also competed at 4x100 freestyle relay, where Cyprus placed 6th.

=== 2002 ===
At the 2002 FINA World Swimming Championships (25 m) in Moscow, competed at the 2nd of the 7 preliminary heats of 100 meters Individual Medley and with the time of 59.35 placed forty-third. A day before, he competed at 200 meters Individual Medley, placed fifty with the time of 2:08.75.

The same year, he participated at 2002 Commonwealth Games at 400 m Individual Medley and at 200 m Individual Medley

=== 2003 ===
In 2003 he competed at 2003 Games of the Small States of Europe where he placed 2nd at 400 meters and 3rd at 200 meters Individual Medley.

On July of the same year, participated at 2003 World Aquatics Championships in Barcelona where he competed at 200 meters Individual Medley placed fifty-first in seventy-eight competitors with the time of 2:11.87.

=== 2004 ===
At the 2004 Summer Olympics in Athens, Dimitriadis qualified again for the 200 m individual medley, by eclipsing a FINA B-standard entry time of 2:08.60 from the Akropolis Grand Prix in Athens. He participated in the same heat as Sydney against two other swimmers Jorge Oliver of Puerto Rico and Yevgeniy Ryzhkov of Kazakhstan. He rounded out the field to second place and forty-eighth overall by a 3.43-second margin behind Oliver with a slowest time of 2:12.27.

After 2004 Summer Olympics, Dimitriadis announced his retirement from swimming.

== College career ==
Dimitriadis has a Bsc in Physical education and sports Science at the University of Athens.

He specialized in Swimming with small ages, and in coaching competitive swimmers.

== Honors and awards ==
Dimitriadis was honored by the Cyprus Swimming Federation and by the Cyprus Ministry of Defense for his swimming achievements.
