= Cyprus at the 1988 Winter Olympics =

- IOC code: CYP
- NOC: Cyprus Olympic Committee
- Website: www.olympic.org.cy (in Greek and English)

in Calgary
- Competitors: 3 (2 men, 1 woman) in 1 sport
- Flag bearer: Karolina Fotiadou
- Medals: Gold 0 Silver 0 Bronze 0 Total 0

Winter Olympics appearances (overview)
- 1980; 1984; 1988; 1992; 1994; 1998; 2002; 2006; 2010; 2014; 2018; 2022; 2026

Cyprus competed at the 1988 Winter Olympics in Calgary, Alberta, Canada.

== Competitors ==
The following is the list of number of competitors in the Games.

Sport	Men	Women	Total
Alpine skiing	2	1	3
Total	2	1	3

== Alpine skiing ==
Men

Athlete	Event	Race 1	Race 2	Total	
Athlete	Event	Time	Time	Time	Rank
Alekhis Fotiadis	Super-G			DNF	–
Sokratis Aristodimou	Super-G			2:03.10	48
Alekhis Fotiadis	Giant Slalom	1:23.17	1:20.45	2:43.62	58
Sokratis Aristodimou	Giant Slalom	1:20.54	1:16.53	2:37.07	54
Alekhis Fotiadis	Slalom	DNF	–	DNF	–
Sokratis Aristodimou	Slalom	1:11.48	1:04.62	2:16.10	32

Women

Athlete	Event	Race 1	Race 2	Total	
Athlete	Event	Time	Time	Time	Rank
Karolina Fotiadou	Giant Slalom	1:19.02	1:25.56	2:44.58	27
Karolina Fotiadou	Slalom	1:07.36	1:07.56	2:14.92	26
