= Cyprus at the 1984 Winter Olympics =

- IOC code: CYP
- NOC: Cyprus Olympic Committee
- Website: www.olympic.org.cy (in Greek and English)

in Sarajevo
- Competitors: 5 (4 men, 1 woman) in 1 sport
- Medals: Gold 0 Silver 0 Bronze 0 Total 0

Winter Olympics appearances (overview)
- 1980; 1984; 1988; 1992; 1994; 1998; 2002; 2006; 2010; 2014; 2018; 2022; 2026

Cyprus competed at the 1984 Winter Olympics in Sarajevo, Yugoslavia.

== Alpine skiing ==
Men

Athlete	Event	Race 1		Race 2		Total	
Athlete	Event	Time	Rank	Time	Rank	Time	Rank
Pavlos Photiadis	Giant Slalom	DNF	–	–	–	DNF	–
Lambros Lambrou	Giant Slalom	1:56.46	78	1:59.51	69	3:55.97	70
Giannos Pipis	Giant Slalom	1:56.18	76	2:11.55	75	4:07.73	75
Alexis Photiadis	Giant Slalom	1:52.98	73	2:01.05	70	3:54.03	69
Pavlos Photiadis	Slalom	DSQ	–	–	–	DSQ	–
Alexis Photiadis	Slalom	DNF	–	–	–	DNF	–
Giannos Pipis	Slalom	1:30.69	66	1:30.83	47	3:01.52	47
Lambros Lambrou	Slalom	1:17.27	58	1:17.35	42	2:34.62	41

Women

Athlete	Event	Race 1		Race 2		Total	
Athlete	Event	Time	Rank	Time	Rank	Time	Rank
Lina Aristodimou	Giant Slalom	1:29.22	50	1:34.23	43	3:03.45	43
Lina Aristodimou	Slalom	1:08.53	26	1:11.11	21	2:19.64	21
