= Men's Volleyball at the Games of the Small States of Europe =

- Sport: Volleyball
- Founded: 1987
- First season: 1987
- No. of teams: 9 members
- Continent: Europe (CEV)
- Most recent champion: Luxembourg (4th title)
- Most titles: Cyprus (11 titles)
- Broadcaster: Laola1.tv (online)
- Website: European Volleyball Confederation

The Men's Volleyball at the Games of the Small States of Europe is a multi sport Events for men's volleyball national teams, it was first introduced in the Second Edition of the Games of the Small States of Europe for men, currently it is held biannually and organized by the European Olympic Committees, controlled by the European Volleyball Confederation, the volleyball federation from Europe.

== Results summary ==
Year	Host	Final			Third place match		
Year	Host	Champions	Score	Runners-up	3rd place	Score	4th place
1987; Details	Monaco	Cyprus		San Marino	Luxembourg		
1989; Details	Cyprus	Cyprus		Luxembourg	Liechtenstein		
1991; Details	Andorra	Luxembourg		Liechtenstein	Monaco		
1993; Details	Malta	Cyprus		Monaco	San Marino		
1995; Details	Luxembourg	Cyprus		Andorra	Luxembourg		
1997; Details	Iceland	Cyprus		San Marino	Andorra		
1999; Details	Liechtenstein	Cyprus		San Marino	Iceland		
2001; Details	San Marino	San Marino		Cyprus	Luxembourg		
2003; Details	Malta	Cyprus		San Marino	Luxembourg		Andorra
2005; Details	Andorra	Cyprus		Andorra	San Marino		Luxembourg
2007; Details	Monaco	Cyprus		San Marino	Luxembourg		Andorra
2009; Details	Cyprus	Cyprus		Andorra	Iceland		San Marino
2011; Details	Liechtenstein	Montenegro		Cyprus	Luxembourg		Iceland
2013; Details	Luxembourg	Cyprus		Luxembourg	Monaco		San Marino
2015; Details	Iceland	Luxembourg		Iceland	San Marino		Monaco
2017; Details	San Marino	Luxembourg		Cyprus	San Marino		Monaco
2019; Details	Montenegro	Montenegro		Cyprus	Luxembourg		San Marino
2025; Details	Andorra	Luxembourg		Cyprus	San Marino		Monaco

== Medal table ==
Rank	Nation	Gold	Silver	Bronze	Total
1	Cyprus	11	5	0	16
2	Luxembourg	4	2	7	13
3	Montenegro	2	0	0	2
4	San Marino	1	5	5	11
5	Andorra	0	3	1	4
6	Iceland	0	1	2	3
6	Monaco	0	1	2	3
8	Liechtenstein	0	1	1	2
Totals (8 entries)		18	18	18	54

== Sources ==
- European Volleyball Confederation
- www.eocgsse.org
