= Cyprus at the 2018 Winter Olympics =

- Flag of Cyprus
- IOC code: CYP
- NOC: Cyprus Olympic Committee
- Website: www.olympic.org.cy (in Greek)

in Pyeongchang, South Korea 9 to 25 February 2018
- Competitors: 1 (1 man) in 1 sport
- Flag bearer: Dinos Lefkaritis
- Medals: Gold 0 Silver 0 Bronze 0 Total 0

Winter Olympics appearances (overview)
- 1980; 1984; 1988; 1992; 1994; 1998; 2002; 2006; 2010; 2014; 2018; 2022; 2026

Cyprus competed at the 2018 Winter Olympics in Pyeongchang, South Korea, which were held from 9 to 25 February 2018. The country's participation in Pyeongchang marked its eleventh appearance at the Winter Olympics since its debut in 1980. The athlete delegation of the country was composed of one competitor, alpine skier Dinos Lefkaritis.

Lefkaritis first competed in the men's giant slalom and was unplaced in the rankings after he did not complete his first run. He then competed in the men's slalom and was again unplaced in the rankings after he did not complete his first run. Thus, Cyprus has yet to win a Winter Olympic medal.

== Background ==
The 2018 Winter Olympics were held in Pyeongchang, South Korea, from 9 to 25 February 2018. This edition marked the nation's eleventh appearance at the Winter Olympics since its debut at the 1980 Winter Olympics in Lake Placid, United States. The nation had never won a medal at the Winter Olympics, with its best performance coming from alpine skier Lina Aristodimou placing 21st in the women's slalom at the 1984 Winter Olympics in Sarajevo.

=== Delegation and ceremonies ===
Six Cypriot alpine skiers had met the qualification criteria for the 2018 Winter Games but only the athlete who had the fewest number of points would qualify. Dinos Lefkaritis would qualify for the nation. Accompanying him at the games were his coach Milan Matic, secretary general of the Cyprus Olympic Committee (COC) Charalambos Lottas, and COC executive Giotis Ioannidis.

The Cypriot delegation came in 75th out of the 91 National Olympic Committees in the 2018 Winter Olympics Parade of Nations within the opening ceremony. Lefkaritis solely held the flag for the delegation in the parade. At the closing ceremony, he held the flag again.

== Competitors ==
List of Cypriot competitors at the 2018 Winter Olympics
Sport	Men	Women	Total
Alpine skiing	1	0	1
Total	1	0	1

== Alpine skiing ==
Cyprus qualified one male alpine skier.

The alpine skiing events were held at the Yongpyong Alpine Centre. Lefkaritis first competed in the men's giant slalom on 18 February. There, he did not finish his first run and did not get to do a second. He would not place in the rankings. He then competed in the men's slalom on 22 February. Again, he would not finish his first run and did not get to do a second. He would not place in the rankings.

Alpine skiing summary
Athlete	Event	Run 1		Run 2		Total	
Athlete	Event	Time	Rank	Time	Rank	Time	Rank
Dinos Lefkaritis	Men's giant slalom	DNF					
Dinos Lefkaritis	Men's slalom	DNF					

== See also ==
- Cyprus at the 2018 Summer Youth Olympics
