= Cyprus at the 2002 Winter Olympics =

- IOC code: CYP
- NOC: Cyprus Olympic Committee
- Website: www.olympic.org.cy (in Greek and English)

in Salt Lake City
- Competitors: 1 in 1 sport
- Flag bearer: Theodoros Christodoulou
- Medals: Gold 0 Silver 0 Bronze 0 Total 0

Winter Olympics appearances (overview)
- 1980; 1984; 1988; 1992; 1994; 1998; 2002; 2006; 2010; 2014; 2018; 2022; 2026

Cyprus sent a delegation to compete at the 2002 Winter Olympics in Salt Lake City, United States from 8–24 February 2002. This was Cyprus' seventh consecutive appearance at a Winter Olympic Games after their debut at the 1980 Winter Olympics. The delegation consisted of one athlete, Theodoros Christodoulou, an alpine skier. He finished 54th in the giant slalom and failed to complete the slalom.

== Background ==
The Cyprus Olympic Committee was first recognised by the International Olympic Committee in 1978, and the nation has participated in every Summer Olympics and Winter Olympic Games since their debut in 1980. At the time of the Salt Lake City Olympics, no Cypriot athlete had ever won a medal. They would win their first medal at the 2012 Summer Olympics. This was their seventh appearance at a Winter Olympic Games. The 2002 Winter Olympics were held from 8–24 February 2002; a total of 2,399 athletes representing 77 National Olympic Committees took part. The only athlete sent by Cyprus to Salt Lake City was an alpine skier, Theodoros Christodoulou. He was the flag bearer for both the opening ceremony and the closing ceremony.

== Alpine skiing ==
Theodoros Christodoulou was 24 years old at the time of the Salt Lake City Olympics, and he was making his Olympic debut. On 21 February, he participated in the men's giant slalom, finishing the first run in a time of 1 minute and 21.67 seconds, and the second in 1 minute and 19.92 seconds. This made his total time for the competition to be 2 minutes and 41.59 seconds, and placed him 54th, out of 57 competitors who finished the race, the gold medal was won by Stephan Eberharter of Austria in a time of 2 minutes and 23.28 seconds. Three days later, on 24 February, Christodoulou took part in the slalom, where he completed the first run in 59.74 seconds and was in 46th place. However, he failed to finish the second run, and went unranked for the competition. Christodoulou would later go on to represent Cyprus at the 2006 Winter Olympics.

Athlete	Event	Race 1	Race 2	Total	
Athlete	Event	Time	Time	Time	Rank
Theodoros Christodoulou	Giant slalom	1:21.67	1:19.92	2:41.59	54
Theodoros Christodoulou	Slalom	59.74	DNF	DNF	–
