= Cyprus at the 1980 Winter Olympics =

- IOC code: CYP
- NOC: Cyprus Olympic Committee
- Website: www.olympic.org.cy (in Greek and English)

in Lake Placid
- Competitors: 3 (2 men, 1 woman) in 1 sport
- Flag bearer: Andreas Pilavakis
- Medals: Gold 0 Silver 0 Bronze 0 Total 0

Winter Olympics appearances (overview)
- 1980; 1984; 1988; 1992; 1994; 1998; 2002; 2006; 2010; 2014; 2018; 2022; 2026

Cyprus competed at the Winter Olympic Games for the first time at the 1980 Winter Olympics in Lake Placid, United States.

== Alpine skiing ==
| Athlete | Event | Race 1 | | Race 2 | | Total | |
| Athlete | Event | Time | Rank | Time | Rank | Time | Rank |
Men
| Andreas Pilavakis | Giant Slalom | 1:44.92 | 62 | DSQ | | | |
| Andreas Pilavakis | Slalom | 1:30.64 | 42 | 1:23.78 | 37 | 2:54.42 | 37 |
| Philippos Xenophontos | Giant Slalom | 1:49.52 | 63 | 1:48.57 | 53 | 3:38.09 | 54 |
| Philippos Xenophontos | Slalom | 1:25.19 | 41 | 1:18.97 | 36 | 2:44.16 | 36 |
Women
| Lina Aristodimou | Giant Slalom | 1:39.78 | 40 | 1:57.07 | 33 | 3:36.85 | 33 |
| Lina Aristodimou | Slalom | DNF | | | | | |

== Sources ==
- Official Olympic Reports
- Olympic Winter Games 1980, full results by sports-reference.com
