= Squash at the 2003 Games of the Small States of Europe =

Results for squash at the 2003 Games of the Small States of Europe.

== Men's Team ==
Each team received a point for each game won and 5 for each match won.

Position	Team	Played	Won	Lost	Games Won	Games Lost	Points
1	Liechtenstein	5	5	0	72	10	97
2	Malta	5	4	1	62	24	82
3	Cyprus	5	3	2	44	42	59
4	Monaco	5	2	3	34	52	44
5	Luxembourg	5	1	4	34	55	39
6	Iceland	5	0	5	10	73	10

== Women's Team ==
Each team received a point for each game won and 5 for each match won.

Position	Team	Played	Won	Lost	Games Won	Games Lost	Points
1	Malta	4	4	0	34	3	46
2	Luxembourg	4	3	1	28	12	37
3	Liechtenstein	4	1	3	19	22	22
4	Monaco	4	2	2	14	29	20
5	Iceland	4	0	4	4	33	4
