= Cyprus at the 1998 Winter Olympics =

- The flag of Cyprus
- IOC code: CYP
- NOC: Cyprus Olympic Committee
- Website: www.olympic.org.cy (in Greek)

in Nagano
- Competitors: 1 (man) in 1 sport
- Flag bearer: Andreas Vasili
- Medals: Gold 0 Silver 0 Bronze 0 Total 0

Winter Olympics appearances (overview)
- 1980; 1984; 1988; 1992; 1994; 1998; 2002; 2006; 2010; 2014; 2018; 2022; 2026

Cyprus sent a delegation to compete at the 1998 Winter Olympics in Nagano, Japan from 7–22 February 1998. This was Cyprus' sixth appearance at a Winter Olympics. Their delegation to Nagano consisted of a single alpine skier, Andreas Vasili. In the men's slalom competition on the penultimate day of the games, he failed to finish his first run and was eliminated.

== Background ==
The Cyprus Olympic Committee was first recognized by the International Olympic Committee in 1978, and the nation has participated in every Summer Olympics and Winter Olympic Games since their debut in 1980. The Nagano Olympics were therefore their sixth appearance at a Winter Olympics. Cyprus has won only one medal in Olympic competition, in sailing at the 2012 Summer Olympics. The 1998 Winter Olympics were held from 7–22 February 1998; a total of 2,176 athletes represented 72 National Olympic Committees. The Cypriot delegation to Nagano consisted of one alpine skier, Andreas Vasili. He was the flag bearer for the opening ceremony.

== Competitors ==
The following is the list of number of competitors in the Games.

Sport	Men	Women	Total
Alpine skiing	1	0	1
Total	1	0	1

== Alpine skiing ==
Andreas Vasili was 26 years old at the time of the Nagano Olympics, and was making his second Olympic appearance, having previously represented Cyprus at the 1992 Winter Olympics. On 21 February, he was one of 66 competitors in the men's slalom, a two-run race where the total of an athlete's times determined their final position. Vasili failed to finish the first run, and was eliminated from the competition. The gold medal was won later in the day by Hans Petter Buraas and the silver by Ole Kristian Furuseth, both of Norway; bronze was won by Thomas Sykora of Austria.

Athlete	Event	Race 1	Race 2	Total	
Athlete	Event	Time	Time	Time	Rank
Andreas Vasili	Men's slalom	DNF	–	DNF	–
