= Cyprus at the 2006 Winter Olympics =

- IOC code: CYP
- NOC: Cyprus Olympic Committee
- Website: www.olympic.org.cy (in Greek and English)

in Turin
- Competitors: 1 in 1 sport
- Flag bearers: Theodoros Christodoulou (opening and closing)
- Medals: Gold 0 Silver 0 Bronze 0 Total 0

Winter Olympics appearances (overview)
- 1980; 1984; 1988; 1992; 1994; 1998; 2002; 2006; 2010; 2014; 2018; 2022; 2026

Cyprus sent a delegation to compete in the 2006 Winter Olympics in Turin, Italy from 10–26 February 2006. This was Cyprus' eighth appearance at a Winter Olympic Games. The Cypriot delegation consisted of one alpine skier, Theodoros Christodoulou. His best performance was 34th in the men's giant slalom.

== Background ==
The Cyprus Olympic Committee was first recognised by the International Olympic Committee in 1978, and the nation has participated in every Summer Olympics and Winter Olympic Games since debuting in 1980. At the time of the Turin Olympics, no Cypriot athlete had ever won a medal. They would win their first medal at the 2012 Summer Olympics six years after Turin. This was their eighth appearance at a Winter Olympic Games. The only athlete sent by Cyprus to Turin was an alpine skier, Theodoros Christodoulou. He was the flag bearer for both the opening ceremony and the closing ceremony.

== Alpine skiing ==
Theodoros Christodoulou was 28 years old at the time of the Turin Olympics, and had previously represented Cyprus at the 2002 Winter Olympics. On 20 February, he took part in the men's giant slalom, posting run times of 1 minute and 30.47 seconds and 1 minute and 31.56 seconds. His total time was 3 minutes and 2.03 seconds, which placed him 34th out of 41 competitors who finished both legs of the race. The men's slalom was held on 25 February. Christodoulou completed his two runs in 1 minute and 5.58 seconds and 1 minute and 0.97 seconds. His total time was therefore 2 minutes and 6.55 seconds, which ranked him 38th, out of 47 classified finishers.

Athlete	Event	Final			
Athlete	Event	Run 1	Run 2	Total	Rank
Theodoros Christodoulou	Men's giant slalom	1:30.47	1:31.56	3:02.03	34
Theodoros Christodoulou	Men's slalom	1:05.58	1:00.97	2:06.55	38

== See also ==
- Cyprus at the 2006 Commonwealth Games
