= XIX Games of the Small States of Europe =

The XIX Games of the Small States of Europe may refer to:

- 2021 Games of the Small States of Europe, a 2021 sporting event which would have been the XIX Games but was cancelled due to the COVID-19 pandemic.
- 2023 Games of the Small States of Europe, a 2023 sporting event.
