= Cyprus at the 1994 Winter Olympics =

- IOC code: CYP
- NOC: Cyprus Olympic Committee
- Website: www.olympic.org.cy (in Greek and English)

in Lillehammer
- Competitors: 1 in 1 sport
- Flag bearer: Karolina Fotiadou
- Medals: Gold 0 Silver 0 Bronze 0 Total 0

Winter Olympics appearances (overview)
- 1980; 1984; 1988; 1992; 1994; 1998; 2002; 2006; 2010; 2014; 2018; 2022; 2026

Cyprus sent a delegation to compete at the 1994 Winter Olympics in Lillehammer, Norway from 12–27 February 1994. This was Cyprus' fifth consecutive appearance at a Winter Olympic Games since their debut in the 1980 Winter Olympics. The delegation sent to Lillehammer by Cyprus consisted of a single alpine skier, Karolina Fotiadou. In the women's super-G she came in 46th place.

== Background ==
The Cyprus Olympic Committee was first recognized by the International Olympic Committee in 1978, and the nation has participated in every Summer Olympics and Winter Olympic Games since their debut in 1980. The 1994 Winter Olympics were held from 12–27 February 1994, a total of 1,737 athletes took part, representing 67 National Olympic Committees. This was Cyprus' fifth consecutive Winter Olympics appearance. The only athlete sent to Lillehammer by Cyprus was alpine skier Karolina Fotiadou. She was chosen as the flag bearer for the opening ceremony.

== Competitors ==
The following is the list of number of competitors in the Games.

Sport	Men	Women	Total
Alpine skiing	0	1	1
Total	0	1	1

== Alpine skiing ==
Karolina Fotiadou was 23 years old at the time of the Lillehammer Olympics. She was a veteran of the 1988 Winter Olympics, and the 1992 Winter Olympics. Her only event in Lillehammer was the women's super-G. On 15 February, she finished the single run race in a time of 1 minute and 43.97 seconds, which put her 46th and last among competitors who finished the race. The gold medal was won by Diann Roffe-Steinrotter of the United States in a time of 1 minute and 22.15 seconds, silver was won by Svetlana Gladysheva of Russia, and bronze was taken by Isolde Kostner of Italy.

Athlete	Event	Final	
Athlete	Event	Time	Rank
Karolina Fotiadou	Women's super-G	1:43.97	46
