= Sophia Papamichalopoulou =

Cypriot alpine skier (born 1990)

Personal information
- Born: April 5, 1990 (age 36) Athens, Greece
- Height: 1.60 m (5 ft 3 in)

Skiing career
- Sport: Alpine skiing
- Club: Ski Club Larnaca
- Disciplines: Slalom, giant slalom, super-G

Olympics
- Teams: 1 - (2010)
- Medals: 0

World Championships
- Teams: 0
- Medals: 0

Sophia Papamichalopoulou (Greek: Σοφία Παπαμιχαλοπούλου; born April 5, 1990) is an alpine skier who represented Cyprus at the 2010 Winter Olympics along with her brother Christopher. Sophia was Cyprus's flag bearer during the 2010 Winter Olympics closing ceremony.

== Olympic Games ==
| Year | Location | Result |
|---|---|---|
| 2010 | Vancouver | 53rd Slalom; 55th Giant slalom |
