= Cyprus Archery Federation =

Sports governing body in Cyprus

Cyprus Archery Federation Κυπριακή Ομοσπονδία Τοξοβολίας
- Abbreviation: CAF (Κ.Ο.ΤΟΞ)
- Formation: 1973
- Headquarters: Nicosia
- Location: Cyprus
- Website: archery.org.cy

The Cyprus Archery Federation (CAF) (Greek: Κυπριακή Ομοσπονδία Τοξοβολίας, Κ.Ο.ΤΟΞ) is the governing body for the sport of archery in Cyprus. It runs an annual national championship, and has hosted a number of international competitions.

== History ==
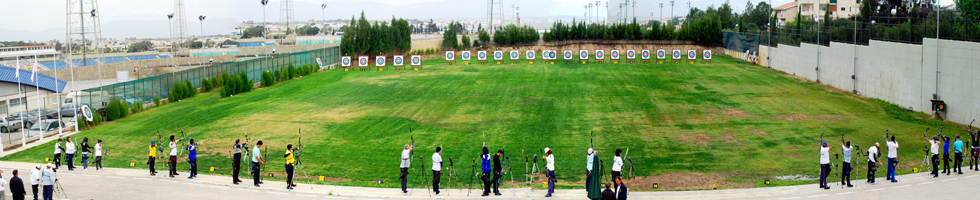
Cyprus Archery Federation grounds

The Cyprus Archery Federation was founded in 1972 but became active much later. In 1987 the Cyprus Archery Club (CAC) in Nicosia was founded later followed by Artemis and Kentavros clubs.

On April 8, 1989 the first Pancyprian Archery Tournament was held at Lapatsa Sporting Club using training bows at a distance of 30 m. One year later CAF held the international Tournament Theofanideia in memory of Stelios Theofanides, a major figure in Cypriot archery. Subsequently Theofanideia become an annual event that CAF holds every year at an international level archery tournament.

Since 1991, the CAF runs a Pancyprian Championship in all age categories and disciplines. In 1993 the first beginners championship was held which was then renamed as the Academies Championship. The two championships are incorporated into the Federation's plans and the winners from each championship are awarded monetary prizes at the end of each championship year.

In 1993 CAF was awarded the first European Archery Grand Prix. It was the biggest athletic event ever held by the Federation and led to CAF organizing the same event in 1994. Since then it held the Grand Prix in 1999 with the participation of 180 athletes from 28 countries and in 2001 with the participation of 135 athletes from 20 countries. In 2007 the European Junior Championship was held in Limassol with the participation of 191 athletes from 18 countries.

In 1996 CAF held the first ever biannual European Small Nations Games. In 1998 they were held by San Marino, 2000 by Malta, 2002 by Luxembourg, 2004 by San Marino and in 2006 again by Cyprus as Monaco was unable to hold them.

Today CAF has more than 1000 registered athletes from 22 Member Clubs. It enjoys recognition by the Cyprus Sports Organisation (KOA) and the Cyprus Olympic Committee (KOE). In addition to its activities at the competitive level, it supports training in coaching, judging and technical equipment setup. It is an active member of the International Archery Federation (FITA) and the European and Mediterranean Archery Union (EMAU).

== Board of directors ==
Elections held in March 2017 have resulted in a new board of directors with the following structure:

- President: Andreas Theofylaktou
- Vice President: Costas TTallis
- Secretary General: Nicos Nicolaou
- Treasurer: Maria Dicomiti
- Ephor: Rena Aristou
- Member: Marinos Panayi
- Member: Lefteris Kokkinos
