= Cyprus at the 2022 Winter Olympics =

- Flag of Cyprus
- IOC code: CYP
- NOC: Cyprus Olympic Committee
- Website: www.olympic.org.cy (in Greek)

in Beijing, China 4–20 February 2022
- Competitors: 1 (1 man and 0 women) in 1 sport
- Flag bearer (opening): Yianno Kouyoumdjian
- Flag bearer (closing): Volunteer
- Medals: Gold 0 Silver 0 Bronze 0 Total 0

Winter Olympics appearances (overview)
- 1980; 1984; 1988; 1992; 1994; 1998; 2002; 2006; 2010; 2014; 2018; 2022; 2026

Cyprus participated at the 2022 Winter Olympics in Beijing, China, held between 4 and 20 February 2022. The country's participation in the Games marked its twelfth appearance at the Winter Olympics since its debut in the 1980 Games.

The Cypriot team consisted of a lone athlete skier, Yianno Kouyoumdjian. While Kouyoumdjian served as the country's flag-bearer during the opening ceremony, a volunteer served as the flag bearer during the closing ceremony. Cyprus did not win any medals in the Games, and had won a lone silver medal in the history of Winter Games.

== Background ==
Athletes from Cyprus competed in the Olympic Games representing Greece from 1896 through 1976. The Cyprus Olympic Committee was formed on 10 June 1974 and recognized by the International Olympic Committee (IOC) in April 1979.

The nation made its debut in the Winter Olympics at the 1980 Games held in 1924 held in Lake Placid, United States. Since making its official Olympic début in 1980, the nation has competed at every Winter Olympics. This edition of the Games marked the nation's twelfth appearance at the Winter Games.

The 2022 Winter Olympics were held in Beijing, China between 4 and 20 February 2022. The lone participant Skier Yianno Kouyoumdjian was the country's flag-bearer in the Parade of Nations during the opening ceremony. An IOC volunteer served as the flag bearer during the closing ceremony. The nation had previously won a lone silver medal in the history of the Winter Games, and did not win a medal in the 2022 edition.

== Competitors ==
The Cypriot delegation consisted of a lone athlete competing in alpine skiing.

Sport	Men	Women	Total
Alpine skiing	1	0	1
Total	1	0	1

== Alpine skiing ==
The basic qualification mark for the slalom and giant slalom events stipulated an average of less than 160 points in the list published by the International Ski Federation (FIS) as on 17 January 2022. The quotas were allocated further based on athletes satisfying other criteria with a maximum of 22 athletes (11 male and 11 female athletes) from a single participating NOC. Cypriot alpine skier Yianno Kouyoumdjian met the basic qualification standard with 85.38 points in the slalom and 73.78 points in the giant slalom categories. Subject to the other criteria, Kouyoumdjian qualified to participate in both the events at the games.

Kouyoumdjian was born in 1997 and was participating in his first Olympic Games. In the men's giant slalom event held on 13 February 2022 at the Yanqing National Alpine Skiing Centre, Kouyoumdjian completed his first run in 1:20.66 to be ranked 50th amongst the 54 competitors. Though he took slightly longer to complete the course during his second run at 1:21.85, he was ranked higher at 39th position. With a combined time of 2:42.51, he finished 42nd in the overall classification. In the men's slalom event held on 16 February 2022, Kouyoumdjian failed to finish his first run, thus earning a DNF.

Athlete	Event	Run 1		Run 2		Total	
Athlete	Event	Time	Rank	Time	Rank	Time	Rank
Yianno Kouyoumdjian	Men's giant slalom	1:20.66	50	1:21.85	39	2:42.51	42
Yianno Kouyoumdjian	Men's slalom	DNF		Did not advance			

== See also ==
- Cyprus at the 2022 Commonwealth Games
