= Swimming at the 2003 Games of the Small States of Europe =

== Medal summary ==
=== Men ===
Event	Gold		Silver		Bronze	
50 m freestyle	Chrysanthos Papachrysanthou (CYP)	23.15	Orn Arnason (ISL)	23.40	Stavros Michaedlies (CYP)	23.55
100 m freestyle	Chrysanthos Papachrysanthou (CYP)	51.81	Anthimos Rotos (CYP)	51.84	Alexandros Aresti (CYP)	53.01
200 m freestyle	George Bagri (MON)	01:52.90	Diego Mularoni (SMR)	01:53.87	Alexandros Aresti (CYP)	01:53.89
400 m freestyle	Diego Mularoni (SMR)	04:01.43	Emanuele Nicolini (SMR)	04:03.10	Hocine Haciane (AND)	04:05.62
1500 m freestyle	Diego Mularoni (SMR)	15:58.74	Emanuele Nicolini (SMR)	16:21.21	Ivan Grougnet (AND)	16:40.93
100 m backstroke	Orn Arnason (ISL)	57.50	Pierre Schwitz (LUX)	59.08	Eric Rottinger (MON)	59.21
200 m backstroke	Orn Arnason (ISL)	02:07.75	Pierre Schwitz (LUX)	02:10.60	Eric Rottinger (MON)	02:14.34
100 m breaststroke	Alwin de Prins (LUX)	01:03.04	Jakob Johann Sveinsson (ISL)	01:04.42	Jon Sigurdsson (ISL)	01:06.26
200 m breaststroke	Jakob Johann Sveinsson (ISL)	02:18.88	Hocine Haciane (AND)	02:20.55	Numi Gunnarsson (ISL)	02:25.78
100 m butterfly	George Bagri (MON)	55.87	Orn Arnason (ISL)	56.04	Luc Decker (LUX)	56.31
200 m butterfly	Luc Decker (LUX)	02:04.80	Hocine Haciane (AND)	02:05.24	George Bagri (MON)	01:06.26
200 m individual medley	Orn Arnason (ISL)	02:06.87	George Bagri (MON)	02:07.36	George Demetriades (CYP)	02:08.77
400 m individual medley	Hocine Haciane (AND)	04:33.16	George Demetriades (CYP)	04:37.16	Omar Fridriksson (ISL)	04:45.21
4×100 m freestyle relay	Cyprus	03:28.65	Iceland	03:29.33	Monaco	03:30.22
4×200 m freestyle relay	Monaco	07:45.77	Luxembourg	07:54.81	Andorra	07:59.97
4×100 m medley relay	Iceland	03:51.32	Monaco	03:51.66	Luxembourg	03:51.73

=== Women ===
Event	Gold		Silver		Bronze	
50 m freestyle						
100 m freestyle	Chrysanthos Papachrysanthou (CYP)	51.81	Anthimos Rotos (CYP)	51.84	Alexandros Aresti (SMR)	53.01
200 m freestyle						
400 m freestyle	Diego Mularoni (SMR)	04:01.43	Emanuele Nicolini (SMR)	04:03.10	Hocine Haciane (AND)	04:05.62
800 m freestyle						
50 m backstroke						
100 m backstroke	Orn Arnason (ISL)	57.50	Pierre Schwitz (LUX)	59.08	Eric Rottinger (MON)	59.21
200 m backstroke	Orn Arnason (ISL)	02:07.75	Pierre Schwitz (LUX)	02:10.60	Eric Rottinger (MON)	02:14.34
50 m breaststroke						
100 m breaststroke	Alwin De Prins (LUX)	01:03.04	Jakob Sveinsson (ISL)	01:04.42	Jon Sigurdsson (ISL)	01:06.26
200 m breaststroke						
50 m butterfly						
100 m butterfly	George Bagri (MON)	55.87	Orn Arnason (ISL)	56.04	Luc Decker (LUX)	56.31
200 m butterfly	Luc Decker (LUX)	02:04.80	Hocine Haciane (AND)	02:05.24	George Bagri (MON)	01:06,26
200 m individual medley	Orn Arnason (ISL)	02:06.,87	George Bagri (MON)	02:07.36	George Demetriades (CYP)	02:08.77
400 m individual medley						
4×100 m freestyle relay						
4×200 m freestyle relay	Monaco	07:45.77	Luxembourg	07:54.81	Andorra	07:59.97
4×100 m medley relay						
