= Alexandra Taylor =

Cypriot alpine skier (born 1994)

Personal information
- National team: Cyprus
- Born: 4 May 1994 (age 31) Egkomi, Cyprus
- Height: 1.74 m (5 ft 9 in)
- Weight: 64 kg (141 lb)

Alexandra Taylor (born 4 May 1994) is an alpine skier from Cyprus. She was scheduled to compete for Cyprus at the 2014 Winter Olympics in the slalom competition, however withdrew from the competition, because she fractured the first lumbar vertebra on 18 February, four days before the race.

== See also ==
- Cyprus at the 2014 Winter Olympics
- Alpine skiing at the 2014 Winter Olympics
