= Constantinos Papamichael =

Cypriot alpine skier (born 1993)

Personal information
- Born: 6 September 1993 (age 32) Lemesos, Cyprus
- Height: 1.65 m (5 ft 5 in)
- Weight: 61 kg (134 lb)

Sport
- Country: Cyprus
- Sport: Alpine skiing

Constantinos Papamichael (born 6 September 1993) is a Cypriot alpine skier. He competed for the 2014 Winter Olympics in the slalom and giant slalom events. In giant slalom race he finished 64th, almost 30 seconds behind the winner Ted Ligety.

He began alpine skiing at the age of nine and qualified for the national team at the age of thirteen. He participated in FIS Alpine World Ski Championships 2011 as well as the FIS Alpine World Ski Championships 2013. His best result at the FIS Alpine World Ski Championships is 45th place in the men's slalom competition in 2013 in Schladming.

He was chosen to be Cyprus' flag bearer at the opening ceremony of the 2014 Winter Olympics.

== See also ==
- Sport in Cyprus
- Cyprus at the Olympics
- Cyprus at the 2014 Winter Olympics
