= Cyprus at the 2026 Winter Olympics =

- Flag of Cyprus
- IOC code: CYP
- NOC: Cyprus Olympic Committee
- Website: www.olympic.org.cy (in Greek)

in Milan and Cortina d'Ampezzo, Italy 6 February 2026 – 22 February 2026
- Competitors: 2 (1 man and 1 woman) in 1 sport
- Flag bearers (opening): Yianno Kouyoumdjian & Andrea Loizidou
- Flag bearer (closing): Yianno Kouyoumdjian
- Medals: Gold 0 Silver 0 Bronze 0 Total 0

Winter Olympics appearances (overview)
- 1980; 1984; 1988; 1992; 1994; 1998; 2002; 2006; 2010; 2014; 2018; 2022; 2026

Cyprus competed at the 2026 Winter Olympics in Milan and Cortina d'Ampezzo, Italy, which was held from 6 to 22 February 2026.

The Cypriot team consisted of two alpine skiers (one per gender). Alpine skiers Yianno Kouyoumdjian and Andrea Loizidou were the country's flagbearer during the opening ceremony. Meanwhile, Yianno Kouyoumdjian was the country's flagbearer during the closing ceremony.

== Competitors ==
The following is the list of number of competitors participating at the Games per sport/discipline.

Sport	Men	Women	Total
Alpine skiing	1	1	2
Total	1	1	2

== Alpine skiing ==
Cyprus qualified one female and one male alpine skier through the basic quota.

Athlete	Event	Run 1		Run 2		Total	
Athlete	Event	Time	Rank	Time	Rank	Time	Rank
Yianno Kouyoumdjian	Men's giant slalom	1:29.14	64	1:22.97	66	2:52.11	64
Yianno Kouyoumdjian	Men's slalom	1:10.88	39	1:08.58	34	2:19.46	34
Andrea Loizidou	Women's slalom	DNF					
