= Cyprus at the 2010 Winter Olympics =

- IOC code: CYP
- NOC: Cyprus Olympic Committee
- Website: www.olympic.org.cy/index.php/gr/ (in Greek)

in Vancouver
- Competitors: 2 in 1 sport
- Flag bearers: Christopher Papamichalopoulos (opening); Sophia Papamichalopoulou (closing)
- Medals: Gold 0 Silver 0 Bronze 0 Total 0

Winter Olympics appearances (overview)
- 1980; 1984; 1988; 1992; 1994; 1998; 2002; 2006; 2010; 2014; 2018; 2022; 2026

Cyprus sent a delegation to compete at the 2010 Winter Olympics in Vancouver, British Columbia, Canada, held between 12–28 February 2010. The national delegation consisted of two athletes, alpine skiers Christopher Papamichalopoulos and Sophia Papamichalopoulou. Papamichalopoulou finished 53rd in the women's slalom, the best finish for Cyprus at these Olympics.

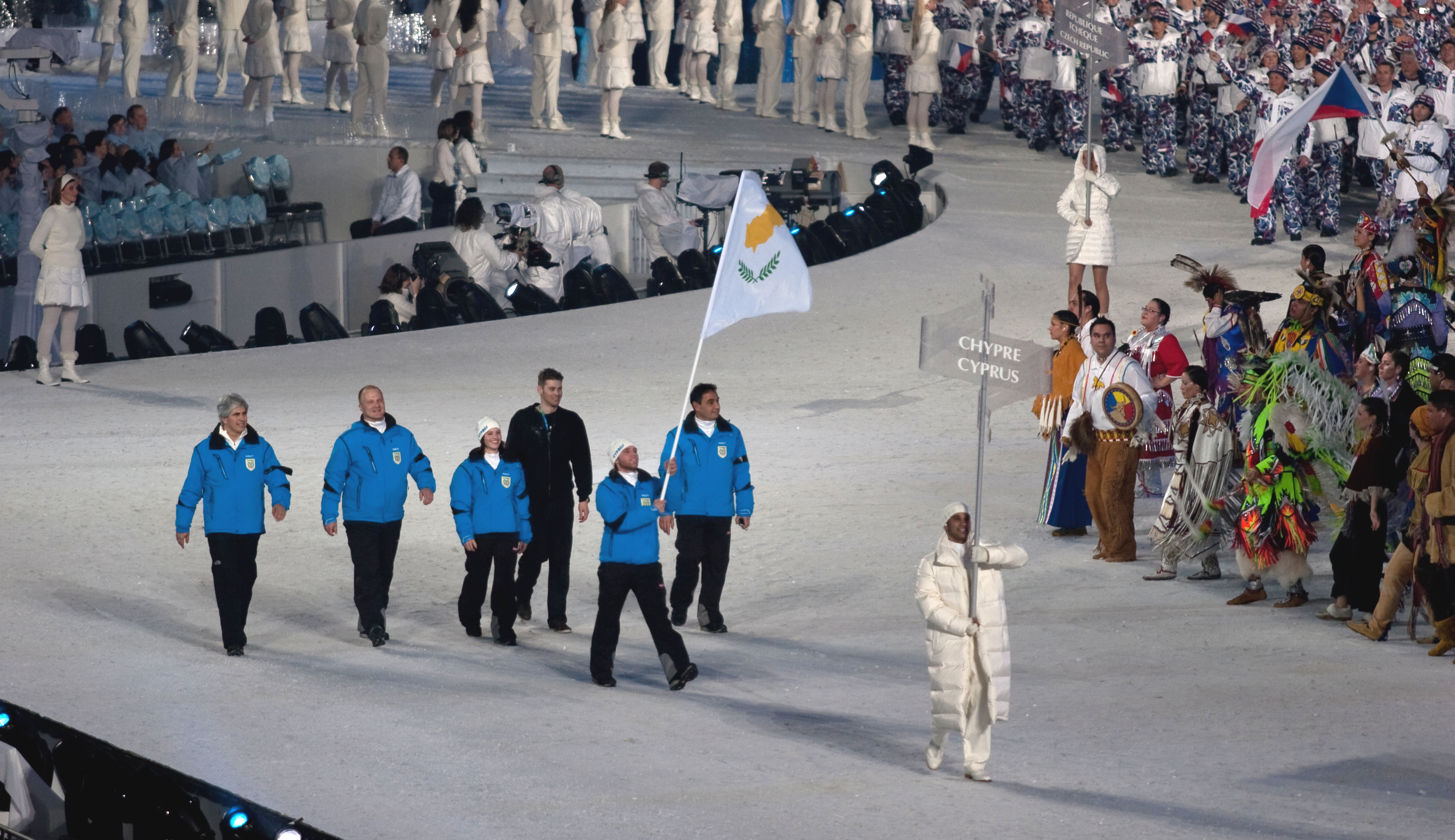
The athletes entering the stadium during the opening ceremonies.

== Background ==
The Cyprus Olympic Committee was first recognized by the International Olympic Committee in 1978, and the nation has participated in every Summer Olympics and Winter Olympic Games since their debut in 1980. At the time of the Vancouver Olympics, no Cypriot athlete had ever won a medal. They would win their first medal at the 2012 Summer Olympics two years after Vancouver. The nation sent two alpine skiers to Vancouver, the brother and sister pair of Christopher Papamichalopoulos and Sophia Papamichalopoulou. Papamichalopoulos was chosen as the flag bearer for the opening ceremony, while Papamichalopoulou was awarded the honor for the closing ceremony.

== Alpine skiing ==
Christopher Papamichalopoulos was 21 at the time of the Olympics. In the giant slalom, held on 23 February, he finished the first run with a time of 1 minute and 29 seconds, but failed to finish the second run, and was unranked for the event. He took part in the men's slalom on 27 February, but failed to finish the first run.

Sophia Papamichalopoulou was 19 years old at the time of the Vancouver Olympics. She competed in both the women's giant slalom and the women's slalom. The giant slalom was held on 24–25 February, as weather postponed the second run until the next day. In her first run, she posted a time of 1 minute and 28 seconds; the next morning she was faster, recording a time of 1 minute and 23 seconds. Her total time of 2 minute and 51 seconds was good for 55th place out of 60 competitors who finished both runs. The slalom event was held on 26 February, and Papamichalopoulou posted two runs of 1 minute and 2 seconds each. Her combined time was good enough for 53rd place, out of 55 competitors who finished both legs of the race.

Athlete	Event	Run 1	Run 2	Total	Rank
Christopher Papamichalopoulos	Men's slalom	DNF			
Christopher Papamichalopoulos	Men's giant slalom	1:29.02	DNF		
Sophia Papamichalopoulou	Women's slalom	1:02.47	1:02.71	2:05.18	53
Sophia Papamichalopoulou	Women's giant slalom	1:28.38	1:23.48	2:51.86	55
