= Volleyball at the Games of the Small States of Europe =

Volleyball at the Games of the Small States of Europe may refer to:

- Men's Volleyball at the Games of the Small States of Europe
- Women's Volleyball at the Games of the Small States of Europe
