= 2021 Games of the Small States of Europe =

Multi-sport event involving athletes from the smallest states of Europe

XIX Games of the Small States of Europe (Note: After the 2021 Games were cancelled, the 2023 Games in Malta became the XIX Games of the Small States of Europe.)
- Host city: Andorra la Vella
- Country: Andorra

The 2021 Games of the Small States of Europe, also formerly known as the XIX Games of the Small States of Europe, was a cancelled sporting event, previously scheduled to take place in Andorra la Vella, the capital city of Andorra. Andorra previously held the 1991 and the 2005 installments of the Games. The 2021 games were cancelled due to the rescheduling of the 2020 Summer Olympics in July 2021 because of the COVID-19 pandemic, with Andorra looking to instead host the 2025 games.

== Bidding and preparation ==
The nations of the GSSE host the event on a rotational basis every two years. Although Malta was originally expected to host the 2021 Games, they instead decided to swap places with Andorra in order to give enough time to build the necessary infrastructure. In May 2016, Andorra confirmed its candidacy for hosting the 2021 Games.

In February 2019, the Organising Committee of the Games first met and was formed of Antoni Martí (the then Prime Minister of Andorra), Olga Gelabert, Marc Pons, Jaume Martí, Jordi Cerqueda, Josep Besolí, Jordi Beal.

In May 2019, Jaume Marti Mandico, president of the Andorran Olympic Committee, was appointed as the President of the Games of the Small States of Europe, as is customary during editions of the Games.

== Games ==
=== Expected participating teams ===
- Andorra (details)
- Cyprus (details)
- Iceland (details)
- Liechtenstein (details)
- Luxembourg (details)
- Malta (details)
- Monaco (details)
- Montenegro (details)
- San Marino (details)
- Vatican City (details)

After attending the previous edition with observer status, the Vatican City achieved full member status and was eligible to enter the 2021 tournament, despite not being an International Olympic Committee member, through a partnership with the Italian Olympic Committee.

=== Expected sports ===
In 2017, the Small States of Europe Karate Federation president Andreas Vasileiou said that he thought the course was "set" for karate's "anticipated debut at the 2021 Games."

During the 2017 Games, the Andorran Olympic Committee announced that they expected to have the following sports at the 2021 Games:

- Athletics
- Basketball
- Cycling
- Gymnastics
- Judo
- Karate
- Shooting
- Swimming
- Table tennis
- Tennis
- Taekwondo
- Volleyball
