= Cyprus at the 2014 Winter Olympics =

- IOC code: CYP
- NOC: Cyprus Olympic Committee
- Website: www.olympic.org.cy (in Greek and English)

in Sochi
- Competitors: 2 in 1 sport
- Flag bearers: Constantinos Papamichael (opening); Alexandra Taylor (closing)
- Medals: Gold 0 Silver 0 Bronze 0 Total 0

Winter Olympics appearances (overview)
- 1980; 1984; 1988; 1992; 1994; 1998; 2002; 2006; 2010; 2014; 2018; 2022; 2026; 2030

Cyprus competed at the 2014 Winter Olympics in Sochi, Russia from 7 to 23 February 2014. The team of two athletes competing in alpine skiing was unveiled on January 29, 2014.

== Competitors ==
Sport	Men	Women	Total
Alpine skiing	1	1	2
Total	1	1	2

== Alpine skiing ==
According to the final quota allocation released on January 20, 2014, Cyprus has two athletes in qualification position. Alexandra Taylor had to withdraw from competition, because she sustained a back injury during training.

Athlete	Event	Run 1		Run 2		Total	
Athlete	Event	Time	Rank	Time	Rank	Time	Rank
Constantinos Papamichael	Men's giant slalom	1:35.74	69	1:37.37	66	3:13.11	64
Constantinos Papamichael	Men's slalom	DNF					
Alexandra Taylor	Women's slalom	DNS					
