= Sport in Cyprus =

Slovakia playing Cyprus in international rugby union

Cyprus, due to its population and size, has modest international sporting achievements. Most sports are governed by associations under the umbrella of the Cyprus Sport Organisation (Greek: Κυπριακός Οργανισμός Αθλητισμού).

== Football ==
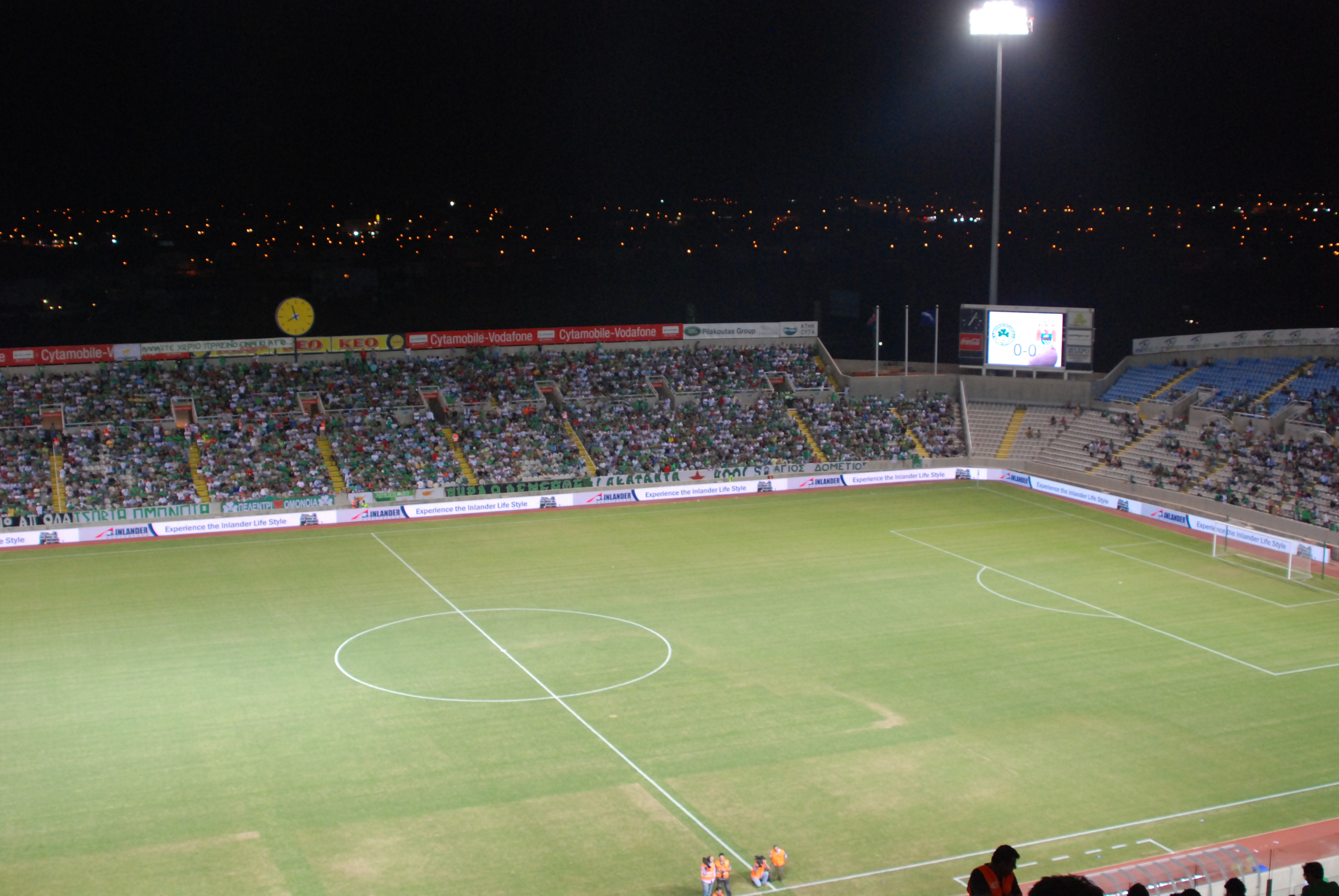
GSP Stadium in Nicosia

Football is the most popular sport in Cyprus. Football was introduced to Cyprus early in the 20th century by the British. As football became established, the clubs were united in agreeing that an official body was needed to regulate the sport. In September 1934, the Cyprus Football Association (CFA) was formed and matches were soon being played on an official basis. The association became a FIFA member in 1948 and an UEFA member in 1962. The Cypriot national team has not yet qualified for any major events, while major Cypriot clubs compete at European competitions with limited success. APOEL FC made history in 2012 by being the first Cypriot team to reach the quarter-finals of Champions League. As of right now, there are 3 professional divisions in the Cypriot football system and more than a hundred clubs across all 6 tiers. The Cypriot First Division is the top tier in the system.

== Basketball ==
Basketball is also quite popular in Cyprus. The Cypriot league is semi-professional, but Cypriot teams have had good European campaigns. In 2008-07 season, EKA AEL has finished 3rd in the FIBA EuroCup.

Cyprus made their debut at the EuroBasket in 2025 as one of the four co-hosts in the group with Italy, Spain, Greece, Bosnia & Herzegovina and Georgia. They have lost all 5 matches, but history has been made.

== Tennis ==
Tennis in Cyprus has recently received more attention mainly due to Marcos Baghdatis' success in the ATP rankings. Baghdatis reached the final of the 2006 Australian Open, was a semifinalist at the 2006 Wimbledon Championships and reached a career-high ATP singles ranking of World No. 8 in August 2006.

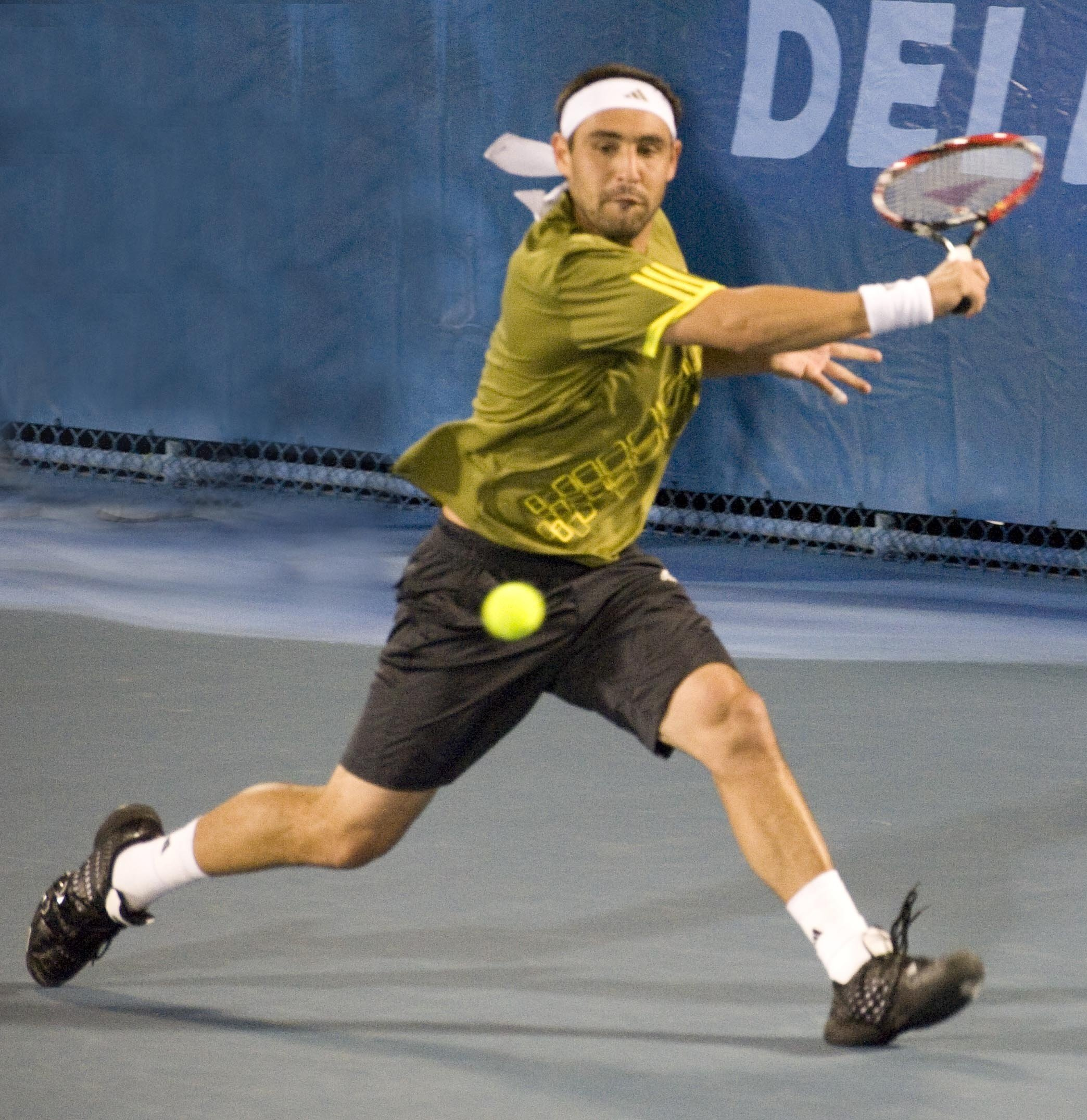
Marcos Baghdatis is the most popular athlete in Cyprus

== Cricket ==
Cricket in Cyprus has recently received more attentionis the governing body of cricket in Cyprus. It is a member of the European Cricket Council and an associate member[1] of the International Cricket Council since 1999.' Cyprus Cricket Association

== Athletics ==
In recent years, Cypriot athletes have achieved some notable successes in Athletics. High jumper Kyriakos Ioannou has won medals in the IAAF World Athletics Championships, Commonwealth Games and the Mediterranean Games. Sprinter Eleni Artymata has also won multiple medals in the Mediterranean Games, including gold medals in the 200 metres in 2009 and 2013.

== Rugby union ==
Rugby union is not very popular on Cyprus, although in the last 2 years it has become more popular. In this sport, in Cyprus, there are 4 different teams, Larnaca Spartans, Limassol Crusaders, Nicosia Titans and Paphos Tigers.

== Olympic Games ==
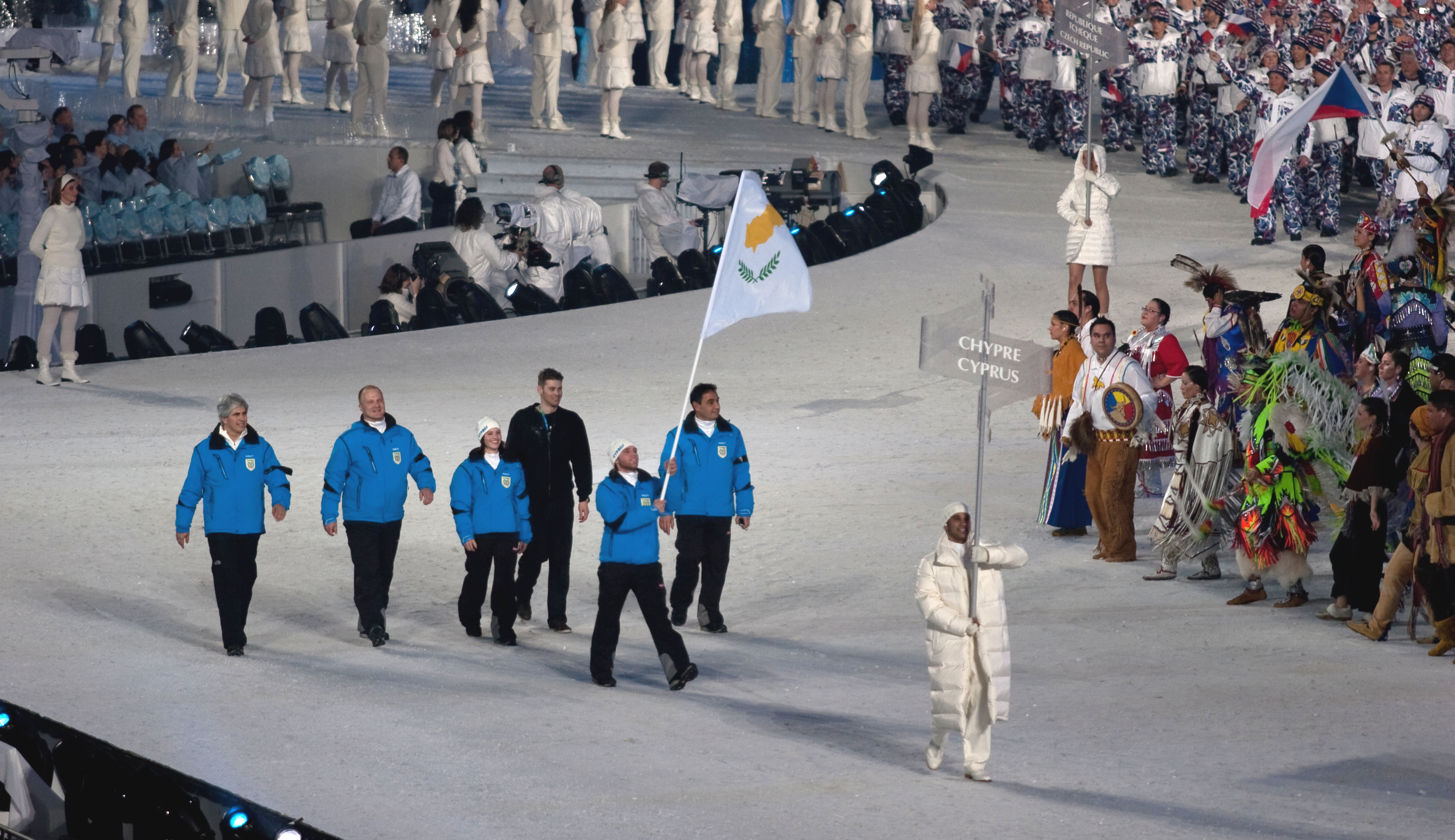
Cyprus in 2010 Winter Olympics

Cyprus has sent athletes to every summer and winter Olympic Games held since 1980. Pavlos Kontides, competing in the men's Laser class sailing event, won the country's first-ever Olympic medal in 2012.

== Cyprus Rally ==
The Cyprus Rally is a rallying competition held yearly in Cyprus since 1970. The event is run by the Cyprus Automobile Association[1] and is based in the city of Limassol (Lemesos). It is run on the winding gravel roads of the nearby mountains of Troödos. It was part of the FIA World Rally Championship from 2000 to 2006. In 2007, the event was part of the FIA Middle East Rally Championship. The same applies for 2008. It is due to rejoin the World Rally Championship in 2009.

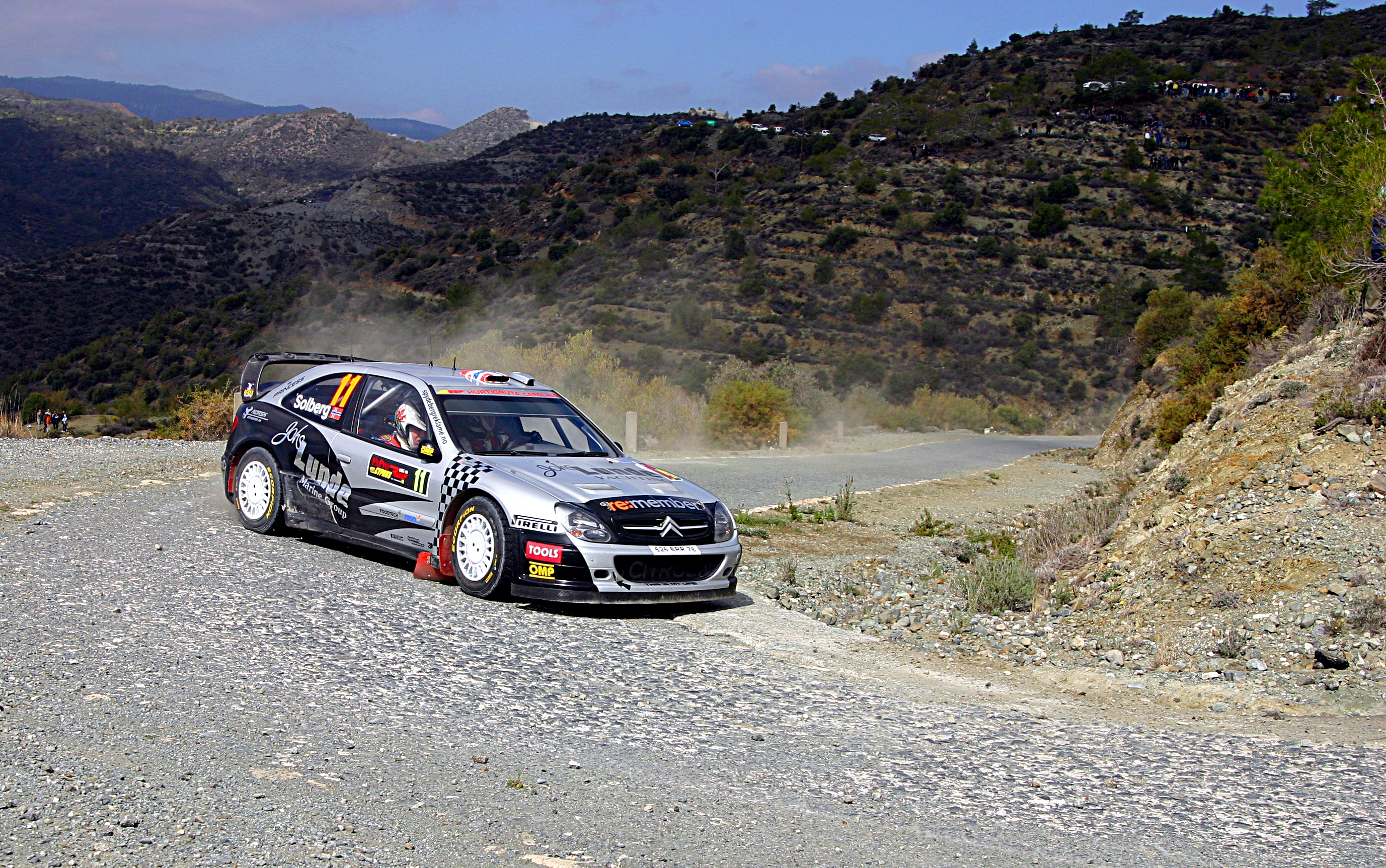
The Cyprus Rally

== Skiing ==
The sport of Skiing first appeared on Cyprus sometime around 1934, when a group of people created the first "Mountaineering Club" of the island. Unfortunately though, the ensuing World War II meant that the development of skiing was delayed for several years.

The Cyprus Ski Club was created on March 2, 1947 and since then it has a leading role in the development of skiing on the island. The first lift was built and operated on the eastern face of Mt. Olympus using primitive equipment, while a second lift was built in 1951 near the "Dolphin" restaurant, to the west of Troodos Square (the remnants of this lift, which was powered by the engine of a Ford truck, can still be seen).

After the independence of Cyprus in 1960, the Ski Club developed into its modern form, with a ski Federation under the auspices of the FIS, and four regional clubs (Nicosia, Limassol, Troodos, and Famagusta) competing in various skiing competitions. Until 1968, mobile lifts operated by the British Army were used, but in 1968 the first lift owned by the CSC was built at Sun Valley 1. The big lift at North Face was the second to be built, followed by Hermes (Sun Valley 2) in 1973, and Hera (North Face 2) in 1986. Simultaneously, more trails were created reaching 9 by 1986. Each of the lifts has its own base area with a cafeteria, and the various lifts are interconnected by a trail network.

Alongside of the development of the area, the CSC initiated the tradition of skiing lessons for the school children of the area from the 1959 season onwards. In 1960, the Federation introduced the annual Pan Cyprian ski competitions. Since 1963, Cypriot skiers have started participating in international competitions, with first participation in the World Championships coming in 1978 at Garmisch-Partenkirchen, Germany. The first Winter Olympic participation of Cyprus took place in the 1980 Olympics at Lake Placid. Ever since, Cyprus has been actively participating in the various regional competitions, as well as the World Championships and the Olympics.

Today many hundreds of Cypriots and perhaps as many foreigners enjoy the wonderful sport of skiing every winter on the beautiful slopes of Mt Olympus. Skiing, with its 60-year plus history on this island, is here not only to stay, but to continue its growth.

== Paragliding ==
It is a relatively new sport in Cyprus, but some clubs has developed around the island. Cyprus Paragliding Club is one of the most active in improving the quality of flights, and finding new sites where paragliding could be possible. From time to time local competitions are organized. Noticeable sites are Curium, Stavrovouni, where is possible to fly above the Stavrovouni Monastery.

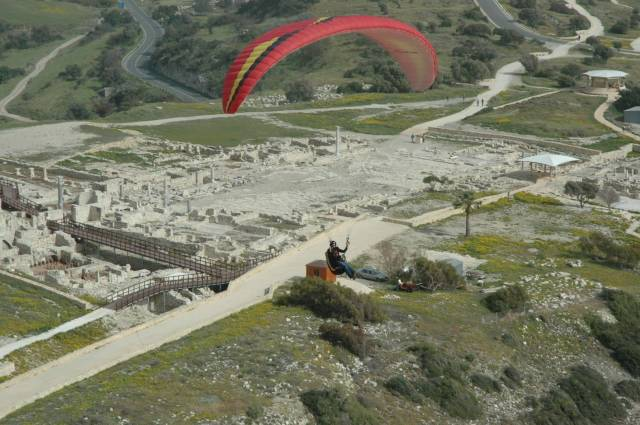
Paragliding in Cyprus

== Beach volleyball ==
Cyprus featured a women's national team in beach volleyball that competed at the 2018–2020 CEV Beach Volleyball Continental Cup.

== More ==
Official website ministry of sport: https://www.facebook.com/ypourgeiopaideias Twitter: @cymoec
