= 1985 Games of the Small States of Europe =

International multi-sport event

I Games of the Small States of Europe I Giochi dei piccoli stati d'Europa
- Country: San Marino
- Nations: 8
- Athletes: 222
- Events: 49 in 7 sports
- Opening: 23 May 1985
- Closing: 26 May 1985
- Opened by: Marino Bollini & Giuseppe Amici

The I Games of the Small States of Europe (GSSE) were the inaugural GSSE edition. The first Games were hosted by the Republic of San Marino and held in 1985.

== Competitions ==
- Athletics ()
- Basketball ()
- Cycling ()
- Judo ()
- Shooting ()
- Swimming ()
- Weightlifting ()

== Medal table ==
Final Table:

* Host nation (San Marino)

| Rank | Nation | Gold | Silver | Bronze | Total |
|---|---|---|---|---|---|
| 1 | Iceland (ISL) | 21 | 7 | 4 | 32 |
| 2 | Cyprus (CYP) | 15 | 8 | 9 | 32 |
| 3 | Luxembourg (LUX) | 11 | 23 | 18 | 52 |
| 4 | San Marino (SMR)* | 2 | 11 | 11 | 24 |
| 5 | Andorra (AND) | 0 | 0 | 4 | 4 |
| 5 | Liechtenstein (LIE) | 0 | 0 | 4 | 4 |
| 7 | Monaco (MON) | 0 | 0 | 2 | 2 |
| 8 | Malta (MLT) | 0 | 0 | 1 | 1 |
| Totals (8 entries) | | 49 | 49 | 53 | 151 |
