= Volleyball at the 2003 Games of the Small States of Europe =

== Men's Team ==
Each team received a 2 points for each match won.

| Position | Team | Played | Won | Lost | Points | Sets Won | Sets Lost | Ratio | Won | Lost | Ratio |
|---|---|---|---|---|---|---|---|---|---|---|---|
| 1 | Cyprus | 5 | 5 | 0 | 10 | 15 | 2 | 7.50 | 75 | 32 | 2.34 |
| 2 | San Marino | 5 | 4 | 1 | 9 | 14 | 3 | 4.60 | 101 | 91 | 1.11 |
| 3 | Luxembourg | 5 | 3 | 2 | 8 | 6 | 6 | 1.00 | 75 | 61 | 1.23 |
| 4 | Andorra | 5 | 2 | 3 | 7 | 6 | 9 | 0.67 | 91 | 101 | 0.90 |
| 5 | Iceland | 5 | 1 | 6 | 6 | 6 | 13 | 0.46 | 61 | 75 | 0.81 |
| 6 | Malta | 5 | 0 | 5 | 5 | 1 | 15 | 0.07 | 32 | 75 | 0.43 |

== Women's Team ==
Each team received a 2 points for each match won.

| Position | Team | Played | Won | Lost | Points | Sets Won | Sets Lost | Ratio | Won | Lost | Ratio |
|---|---|---|---|---|---|---|---|---|---|---|---|
| 1 | Cyprus | 5 | 5 | 0 | 10 | 15 | 5 | 3.0 | 483 | 400 | 1.21 |
| 2 | Luxembourg | 5 | 4 | 1 | 9 | 13 | 6 | 2.2 | 439 | 366 | 1.20 |
| 3 | San Marino | 5 | 3 | 2 | 8 | 11 | 9 | 1.2 | 439 | 453 | 0.97 |
| 4 | Malta | 5 | 2 | 3 | 7 | 11 | 9 | 1.2 | 429 | 388 | 1.11 |
| 5 | Iceland | 5 | 1 | 4 | 6 | 5 | 12 | 0.4 | 346 | 417 | 0.83 |
| 6 | Liechtenstein | 5 | 0 | 5 | 5 | 1 | 15 | 0.1 | 289 | 401 | 0.72 |
