= Andreas Pilavakis (alpine skier) =

Cypriot alpine skier (born 1959)

Personal information
- Nationality: Cypriot
- Born: 15 February 1959 (age 66)

Sport
- Sport: Alpine skiing

Andreas Pilavakis (born 15 February 1959) is a Cypriot alpine skier. He competed in two events at the 1980 Winter Olympics.
