= Christopher Papamichalopoulos =

Cypriot alpine skier (born 1988)

Personal information
- Born: April 5, 1988 (age 38) Athens, Greece
- Height: 1.78 m (5 ft 10 in)

Skiing career
- Sport: Alpine skiing
- Club: Ski Club Larnaca
- Disciplines: Slalom, giant slalom, super-G

Olympics
- Teams: 1 - (2010)
- Medals: 0

World Championships
- Teams: 2 - (2007, '09)
- Medals: 0

Christopher Papamichalopoulos (Greek: Χριστόφορος Παπαμιχαλόπουλος; born April 5, 1988) is an alpine skier from Cyprus. He competed for Cyprus at the 2010 Winter Olympics in the slalom and giant slalom. Christopher was Cyprus's flag bearer during the 2010 Winter Olympics opening ceremony.

During February 2009, he competed for Cyprus at the FIS Alpine World Ski Championships 2009 held in Val d'Isère, Savoie, France. In 2007 he competed at the FIS Alpine World Ski Championships 2007 held at Åre, Sweden, achieving 43rd position in the event of Slalom.

Previously, at the 2005 European Youth Olympic Festival (EYOF), held in Monthey, Switzerland, he competed in the events of Slalom (38th), giant slalom (DNF1), and Super G (49th).
