= Cyprus at the Olympics =

- IOC code: CYP
- NOC: Cyprus Olympic Committee
- Website: www.olympic.org.cy (in Greek and English)
- Medals Ranked 126th: Gold 0 Silver 2 Bronze 0 Total 2

Summer appearances
- 1980; 1984; 1988; 1992; 1996; 2000; 2004; 2008; 2012; 2016; 2020; 2024; 2028

Winter appearances
- 1980; 1984; 1988; 1992; 1994; 1998; 2002; 2006; 2010; 2014; 2018; 2022; 2026

Cyprus officially made its debut in 1980 and has participated in every Summer Olympic Games and Winter Olympic Games.

== With the Colors of Greece ==
Cypriot athletes first participated in the modern Olympic Games during the inaugural 1896 Athens Olympics. At these Games, Cypriot competitors competed under the Greek flag. One of the most notable among them was Ioannis Frangoudis, an exceptional shooter of his time. Frangoudis won a gold medal in the 25-meter rapid fire pistol event and a silver medal in the men's 300-meter free rifle event with three positions.

The first Cypriot athlete to compete in the Olympics was Anastasios Andreou, a 110-meter hurdles champion. At the Athens Games, Andreou competed in the preliminary rounds of his event but finished fourth in his heat and did not advance. A significant moment in Cypriot Olympic history was the participation of Domnitsa Lanitou-Kavounidou. Born in Limassol, Lanitou-Kavounidou served as a champion for the "Olympia" Athletic Club. She was the first Greek female track and field athlete to compete in the Olympics. At the 1936 Berlin Olympics, she competed in the 100 meters and the 80 meters hurdles. After World War II, she also participated in the 1948 London Olympics.

Later, Stavros Tziortzis achieved notable success at the 1972 Munich Olympics, competing in the 400-meter hurdles. Tziortzis managed to qualify for the final and finished in sixth place.

== As an Independent Nation ==
The Cyprus Olympic Committee was established on June 10, 1974, and was recognized as an official member of the International Olympic Committee in April 1979, during a session in Montevideo. Cyprus made its first appearances in the Olympics at the 1980 Winter Games in Lake Placid and the 1980 Summer Games in Moscow. Since then, Cyprus has participated in all subsequent Olympic Games with a total of 128 athletes.

Cyprus as an independent Country has sent athletes to every Olympic Games held since 1980. Cyprus earned its first Olympic medal in the 2012 Summer Olympics when Pavlos Kontides earned a silver medal in the men's laser sailing event. They had a near miss at the 2008 Olympics when Antonis Nikolaidis lost the bronze medal shoot-off in men's skeet. In the 2024 Summer Olympics, Kontides won a second silver medal for the nation.

Turkish Cypriots who are unable or unwilling to compete under the flag of the Republic of Cyprus either compete for Turkey, another country, or not at all, due to that the illegally occupied areas in the north, selfproclaimed as Turkish Republic of Northern Cyprus is not internationally recognized by any major or minor authority (including the IOC), it has no Olympic committee. Therefore, all Cypriot Olympians are required to compete under the name and flag of the Republic of Cyprus.

== Medal tables ==
=== Medals by Summer Games ===
Games	Athletes	Gold	Silver	Bronze	Total	Rank
(Soviet Union) 1980 Moscow	14	0	0	0	0	–
(United States) 1984 Los Angeles	10	0	0	0	0	–
(South Korea) 1988 Seoul	9	0	0	0	0	–
(Spain) 1992 Barcelona	17	0	0	0	0	–
(United States) 1996 Atlanta	17	0	0	0	0	–
(Australia) 2000 Sydney	22	0	0	0	0	–
(Greece) 2004 Athens	20	0	0	0	0	–
(China) 2008 Beijing	17	0	0	0	0	–
(United Kingdom) 2012 London	13	0	1	0	1	70
(Brazil) 2016 Rio de Janeiro	16	0	0	0	0	–
(Japan) 2020 Tokyo	15	0	0	0	0	–
(France) 2024 Paris	16	0	1	0	1	74
(United States) 2028 Los Angeles	future event					
(Australia) 2032 Brisbane	future event					
Total		0	2	0	2	126

=== Medals by Winter Games ===
Games	Athletes	Gold	Silver	Bronze	Total	Rank
(United States) 1980 Lake Placid	3	0	0	0	0	–
(Socialist Federal Republic of Yugoslavia) 1984 Sarajevo	5	0	0	0	0	–
(Canada) 1988 Calgary	3	0	0	0	0	–
(France) 1992 Albertville	4	0	0	0	0	–
(Norway) 1994 Lillehammer	1	0	0	0	0	–
(Japan) 1998 Nagano	1	0	0	0	0	–
(United States) 2002 Salt Lake City	1	0	0	0	0	–
(Italy) 2006 Turin	1	0	0	0	0	–
(Canada) 2010 Vancouver	2	0	0	0	0	–
(Russia) 2014 Sochi	2	0	0	0	0	–
(South Korea) 2018 Pyeongchang	1	0	0	0	0	–
(China) 2022 Beijing	1	0	0	0	0	–
(Italy) 2026 Milano Cortina	2	0	0	0	0	–
(France) 2030 French Alps	future event					
(United States) 2034 Utah	future event					
Total		0	0	0	0	–

=== Medals by summer sport ===
Sport	Gold	Silver	Bronze	Total
Sailing	0	2	0	2
Totals (1 entries)	0	2	0	2

== List of medalists ==
Medal	Name(s)	Games	Sport	Event
Silver	Pavlos Kontides	2012 London	Sailing	Laser
Silver	Pavlos Kontides	2024 Paris	Sailing	Laser

== See also ==
- List of flag bearers for Cyprus at the Olympics
- Category:Olympic competitors for Cyprus
- Cyprus at the Paralympics
- Cyprus Photographers at Olympic Games by Cypnoc
