= Lina Aristodimou =

Cypriot alpine skier (born 1965)

Personal information
- Nationality: Cypriot
- Born: 30 March 1965 (age 59); Nicosia, Cyprus

Sport
- Sport: Alpine skiing

Lina Aristodimou (born 30 March 1965) is a Cypriot alpine skier. She competed at the 1980 Winter Olympics and the 1984 Winter Olympics. She was the first woman to represent Cyprus at the Olympics.
