= 1987 Games of the Small States of Europe =

International multi-sport event

II Games of the Small States of Europe II Jeux des petits États d'Europe
- Country: Monaco
- Nations: 8
- Athletes: 468
- Events: 66 in 9 sports
- Opening: 14 May 1987
- Closing: 17 May 1987
- Opened by: Rainier III

The II Games of the Small States of Europe were held in the Principality of Monaco from 14 to 17 May 1987.

== Competitions ==
- Athletics ()
- Basketball ()
- Cycling ()
- Judo ()
- Shooting ()
- Swimming ()
- Tennis ()
- Powerlifting ()
- Volleyball ()

== Medal count ==
Final Table:

* Host nation (Monaco)

Rank	Nation	Gold	Silver	Bronze	Total
1	Iceland (ISL)	27	14	7	48
2	Luxembourg (LUX)	15	25	22	62
3	Cyprus (CYP)	13	17	16	46
4	Monaco (MON)*	6	3	11	20
5	Liechtenstein (LIE)	3	1	6	10
6	San Marino (SMR)	1	5	5	11
7	Malta (MLT)	1	1	4	6
8	Andorra (AND)	0	0	1	1
Totals (8 entries)		66	66	72	204
