= 2003 Games of the Small States of Europe =

International multi-sport event

X Games of the Small States of Europe X Logħob tal-Pajjiżi ż-Żgħar tal-Ewropa
- Country: Malta
- Nations: 8
- Events: 105 in 10 sports
- Opening: 2 June 2003
- Closing: 7 June 2003
- Opened by: Guido de Marco
- Website: www.nocmalta.org/gsse.htm

The 2003 Games of the Small States of Europe, or the Xth Games of the Small States of Europe, were held in Valletta, Malta from June 2 to 7, 2003. Valletta previously hosted the games in 1993. Malta was not due to host the Games again until 2009, but a strong bid helped them to gain the games six years early. Administration of the games was done jointly by the Maltese Ministry of Education and the Malta Olympic Committee. The games were declared open by President Guido de Marco on June 2.

== Overview and participation ==
The 2003 edition of the Games of the Small States of Europe was attended by all of the eligible nations. Eligible nations are European states with fewer than 1 million citizens. A total of 820 athletes from the eight eligible nations competed, the highest ever; 803 had attended the 1993 Games in Malta and the 2005 Games in Andorra had 793 participants. The host nation Malta had 156 athletes, the most of any nation. Cyprus sent 143 competitors. The Icelandic delegation was 133 participants. Luxembourg also had 113 representatives. Monaco and San Marino came with 89 and 78 athletes, respectively. Andorra brought 66 participants, less than half of the total they would bring to the 2005 Games. Liechtenstein had the smallest delegation, bringing only 42 athletes.

== Competitions ==
Competitions in the 2003 Games were held in ten disciplines.

Numbers in parentheses indicate the number of medal events contested in each sport.

- Athletics (35)
- Basketball (2)
- Judo (16)
- Sailing (3)
- Shooting (7)
- Squash (4)
- Swimming (31)
- Table tennis (6)
- Tennis (4)
- Volleyball (2)

== Themes and mascots ==
The theme song of the 2003 Games of the Small States was called “Reaching Higher” and continued in with the traditional themes of such music for international competitions. “Reaching Higher” was performed at the opening ceremonies by Ira Losco, a Maltese singer who had gained prominence in the Eurovision Song Contest 2002 representing Malta.

The mascot of the 2003 Games was Elmo, a cartoon-illustrated Pikeman. The official descriptions of Elmo state that he was chosen as mascot because Pikemen, as well as athletes, both need “a combination of physical preparation and a strong will to achieve success.”

The official emblem for the 2003 Games is based around eight points. These eight points have two meanings: they resemble the Maltese Cross, a traditional symbol of Malta, and represent the eight competing members of the Games of the Small States of Europe. The logos colours incorporate the colours of the flags of participant nations.

== Highlights ==
- Cypriot sprinter Anninos Marcoullides won his final medals in the Games of the Small States, winning the 100 m and 200 m double. His total medal count in the Games stands at 12.
- Björn Margeirsson of Iceland ended Andorran middle-distance runner Victor Martínez's dominance of the 1500 m; Martínez had won the previous three titles and also went on to win the 2005 title.
- Andorran long-distance runner Toni Bernardó won a double of his own, winning the men's 5,000 m and 10,000 m.
- Men's hurdling events were not held at the 2003 Games. Morfo Baourda of Cyprus won the women's 100 m hurdles.
- Cyprus beat Iceland in men's basketball despite 26 points in the final for Damon Johnson in a losing effort. Cyprus also did well in the women's basketball competition, winning a silver medal as Malta won the gold in dominating fashion.
- In Volleyball, Cyprus won both the men's and women's gold medals. Luxembourg and San Marino also had success. Luxembourg took the silver in women's and the bronze in men's competition; San Marino took the silver in men's and the bronze in women's.
- Iceland was upset in both 4 × 100 m swimming relays. Luxembourg won the women's event, and Cyprus won the men's. The Icelandic relay teams were silver medalists in each.

== Medal count ==
* Host nation (Malta)

Rank	Nation	Gold	Silver	Bronze	Total
1	Cyprus (CYP)	34	20	27	81
2	Luxembourg (LUX)	21	17	15	53
3	Iceland (ISL)	20	24	23	67
4	Malta (MLT)*	11	18	15	44
5	Monaco (MON)	7	7	10	24
6	San Marino (SMR)	6	10	9	25
7	Andorra (AND)	4	6	8	18
8	Liechtenstein (LIE)	2	1	2	5
Totals (8 entries)		105	103	109	317

== Venues ==
Most of the events were concentrated in and around Valletta, but very few took place in Valletta proper. Swimming events took place at the National Swimming Pool Complex, which is also where the official offices of the Malta Olympic Committee are located. The swimming complex is under the scope of the University of Malta.

Adjacent to the Swimming Complex, and also on the university campus, was the sports complex where basketball games were held. Both events were in Msida, near Valletta. Tennis and squash were held at the sporting in club in Marsa, south of Valletta. Also located in Marsa is the Maltese National Athletics Stadium, known as the Matthew Micallef St. John Athletics Stadium.

Athletics events were held at the stadium, which underwent upgrades in preparation for the Games. Judo took place in the Sporting Pavilion at St. Aloysius’ College in Birkirkara. The volleyball events took place at two different locations in two different cities. Women's volleyball took place at the Cottonera Sports Complex in Cospicua. Men's volleyball took place in the Corradino Sports Complex in Paola, a few miles south.

Among the events held further from Valletta were the sailing events. Sailing events took place in at St. Paul's Bay at the New Dolmen Beach Resort. Shooting events took place in Bidnija.

All events but one took place on Malta, this being table tennis that was held at the Gozo Sports Complex in Rabat, also known as Victoria, Malta.

== See also ==
- Games of the Small States of Europe
- Malta 2003
