= Andreas Vasili =

Cypriot alpine skier (born 1971)

Personal information
- Nationality: Cypriot
- Born: 19 October 1971 (age 53)

Sport
- Sport: Alpine skiing

Andreas Vasili (Greek: Ανδρέας Βασίλης; born 19 October 1971) is a Cypriot alpine skier. He competed at the 1992 Winter Olympics and the 1998 Winter Olympics.
