= Alekhis Fotiadis =

Cypriot alpine skier (born 1967)

Personal information
- Nationality: Cypriot
- Born: 25 July 1967 (age 57); Nicosia, Cyprus

Sport
- Sport: Alpine skiing

Alekhis Fotiadis (Greek: Αλέχης Φωτιάδης; born 25 July 1967) is a Cypriot alpine skier. He competed at the 1984, 1988 and the 1992 Winter Olympics. At the first Games in Sarajevo, he placed 69th in the giant slalom and did not finish the slalom. Four years later in Calgary, he placed 58th in the giant slalom. He also competed in the supergiant and slalom, but failed to finish both events. At the last Olympics, he placed 81st in the super giant, 61st in the giant slalom and 44th in the slalom. He was a member of the Cyprus Ski Club.
