= Theodoros Christodoulou =

Cypriot alpine skier (born 1977)

Personal information
- Nationality: Cypriot
- Born: Theodoros Christodoulou; March 12, 1977 (age 49)

Sport
- Country: Cyprus
- Sport: Alpine skiing

Theodoros Christodoulou (Greek: Θεόδωρος Χριστοδούλου; born March 12, 1977) is a Cypriot alpine skier.

He represented his country at the 2002 and 2006 Winter Olympics.
