= Sokratis Aristodimou =

Cypriot alpine skier (born 1970)

Personal information
- Nationality: Cypriot
- Born: 4 May 1970 (age 54)

Sport
- Sport: Alpine skiing

Sokratis Aristodimou (Greek: Σωκράτης Αριστοδήμου; born 4 May 1970) is a Cypriot alpine skier. He competed at the 1988 Winter Olympics and the 1992 Winter Olympics.
