= 1999 Games of the Small States of Europe =

International multi-sport event

VIII Games of the Small States of Europe VIII Spiele der kleinen Staaten von Europa
- Country: Liechtenstein
- Nations: 8
- Athletes: 566
- Events: 86 in 9 sports
- Opening: 24 May 1999
- Closing: 29 May 1999

The VIII Games of the Small States of Europe were held from 24 to 29 May 1999 in the Principality of Liechtenstein.

== Competitions ==
- Athletics ()
- Cycling ()
- Judo ()
- Shooting ()
- Squash ()
- Swimming ()
- Table tennis ()
- Tennis ()
- Volleyball ()

== Medal count ==
* Host nation (Liechtenstein)

Rank	Nation	Gold	Silver	Bronze	Total
1	Iceland (ISL)	29	20	24	73
2	Luxembourg (LUX)	20	16	19	55
3	Cyprus (CYP)	14	13	15	42
4	San Marino (SMR)	6	5	7	18
5	Andorra (AND)	5	12	11	28
6	Monaco (MON)	5	9	6	20
7	Malta (MLT)	4	8	8	20
8	Liechtenstein (LIE)*	3	3	2	8
Totals (8 entries)		86	86	92	264
