= 1997 Games of the Small States of Europe =

International multi-sport event

VII Games of the Small States of Europe VII Smáþjóðaleikarnir
- Host city: Reykjavík
- Country: Iceland
- Nations: 8
- Athletes: 714
- Events: 87 in 10 sports
- Opening: 2 June 1997
- Closing: 7 June 1997
- Opened by: Ólafur Ragnar Grímsson

The VI Games of the Small States of Europe were held from 2 to 7 June 1997 in Reykjavík, Iceland.

== Competitions ==
- Athletics ()
- Basketball ()
- Cycling ()
- Gymnastics ()
- Judo ()
- Shooting ()
- Squash ()
- Swimming ()
- Table tennis ()
- Tennis ()
- Volleyball ()

== Medal count ==
Final Table:

* Host nation (Iceland)

Rank	Nation	Gold	Silver	Bronze	Total
1	Iceland (ISL)*	33	32	32	97
2	Cyprus (CYP)	30	25	14	69
3	Monaco (MON)	7	6	14	27
4	Malta (MLT)	5	10	12	27
5	Luxembourg (LUX)	4	3	9	16
6	San Marino (SMR)	3	5	11	19
7	Andorra (AND)	3	5	10	18
8	Liechtenstein (LIE)	2	3	3	8
Totals (8 entries)		87	89	105	281
