= 1993 Games of the Small States of Europe =

International multi-sport event

V Games of the Small States of Europe V Logħob tal-Pajjiżi ż-Żgħar tal-Ewropa
- Country: Malta
- Nations: 8
- Athletes: 690
- Events: 87 in 8 sports
- Opening: 25 May 1993
- Closing: 29 May 1993
- Opened by: Ċensu Tabone

The V Games of the Small States of Europe were hosted by the Republic of Malta from 25 to 29 May 1993.

== Competitions ==
- Athletics ()
- Basketball ()
- Cycling ()
- Judo ()
- Shooting ()
- Swimming ()
- Tennis ()
- Volleyball ()

== Medals count ==
* Host nation (Malta)

Rank	Nation	Gold	Silver	Bronze	Total
1	Iceland (ISL)	36	17	15	68
2	Cyprus (CYP)	26	23	22	71
3	Luxembourg (LUX)	8	14	10	32
4	Monaco (MON)	7	13	10	30
5	Malta (MLT)*	4	7	21	32
6	Liechtenstein (LIE)	4	2	7	13
7	San Marino (SMR)	2	6	5	13
8	Andorra (AND)	0	5	10	15
Totals (8 entries)		87	87	100	274
