= 1995 Games of the Small States of Europe =

International multi-sport event

VI Games of the Small States of Europe VI Spiller vun de klenge Staate vun Europa VI Jeux des petits États d'Europe VI Spiele der kleinen Staaten von Europa
- Country: Luxembourg
- Nations: 8
- Athletes: 684
- Events: 88 in 9 sports
- Opening: 29 May 1995
- Closing: 3 June 1995
- Opened by: Jean, Grand Duke of Luxembourg

The VI Games of the Small States of Europe were held from 29 May to 3 June 1995, hosted by the Grand Duchy of Luxembourg.

== Competitions ==
- Athletics ()
- Basketball ()
- Cycling ()
- Judo ()
- Shooting ()
- Swimming ()
- Table tennis ()
- Tennis ()
- Volleyball ()

== Medals count ==
* Host nation (Luxembourg)

Rank	Nation	Gold	Silver	Bronze	Total
1	Iceland (ISL)	33	17	28	78
2	Cyprus (CYP)	22	25	22	69
3	Luxembourg (LUX)*	20	26	12	58
4	Liechtenstein (LIE)	5	2	1	8
5	Monaco (MON)	3	4	17	24
6	Andorra (AND)	2	5	8	15
7	San Marino (SMR)	2	5	2	9
8	Malta (MLT)	1	4	7	12
Totals (8 entries)		88	88	97	273
