= 2005 Games of the Small States of Europe =

International multi-sport event

XI Games of the Small States of Europe XI Jocs dels Petits Estats d'Europa
- Country: Andorra
- Nations: 8
- Events: 120 in 11 sports
- Opening: 30 May 2005
- Closing: 4 June 2005
- Opened by: Joan Enric Vives Sicília
- Main venue: Estadi Comunal d'Andorra la Vella
- Website: www.andorra2005.ad/

The 2005 Games of the Small States of Europe, or the XIth Games of the Small States of Europe, were held in Andorra la Vella, Andorra from May 30 to June 4, 2005. Andorra la Vella previously hosted the games in 1991. Administration of the games was done jointly by the Andorran government and the Andorran Olympic Committee. Joan Enric Vives Sicília, one of the Co-Princes of Andorra, declared the games open on May 30.

== Overview and participation ==
The 2005 edition of the Games of the Small States of Europe was one of the largest ever and was attended by all eligible countries. Eligible nations are European states with less than 1 million citizens. 793 total athletes from the eight eligible nations competed, the highest since 803 attended the 1993 Games in Valletta. Cyprus had 150 participants. The host nation Andorra brought 132. Iceland and Luxembourg had 120 and 118 participants respectively. San Marino brought 94 athletes, while Monaco brought 76. Malta participated with 66 athletes, and Liechtenstein brought 37.

== Competitions ==
Competitions in the 2005 Games were held in ten disciplines; a total of 120 events were held in these ten disciplines. There was one change in disciplines since the 2003 Games; Squash was removed from competition. It was replaced in Andorra by Taekwondo.

Numbers in parentheses indicate the number of medal events contested in each sport.

- Athletics (35)
- Basketball (2)
- Cycling
- Judo (20)
- Shooting (7)
- Swimming (31)
- Table tennis
- Taekwondo
- Tennis (4)
- Volleyball (2)

== Themes and mascots ==
Official Mascot

The 2005 Games theme song was called “The Flame in the Hands.” Lyrics and music were both written by composer Pep Sala. Andorran singer Estefania Alimbau performed the theme at the games’ opening ceremonies. The intention is for “The Flame in the Hands” to become the general theme of the Games of the Small States of Europe, not just the 2005 Games.

The mascot of the games was Bagaleu, a white owl with multicolored glasses. Bagaleu was designed by an Andorran student. The student also composed a myth of Bagaleu's origins; in this story, he hails from the town of Llorts. Bagaleu publicly debuted in Parc Central in Andorra la Vella on October 20, 2004.

== Highlights ==
IOC president Jacques Rogge and former IOC president Juan Antonio Samaranch both attended the opening ceremonies of the Games at Sonwell Field.

Among the star athletes of the games was Andorran swimmer Hocine Haciane. Haciane won five gold medals and one silver medal, winning the 400 m freestyle, 200 m breaststroke, 200 m butterfly, 200 m and 400 m medleys, and finishing second in the 1,500 m freestyle. Hacine spent the time before the competition training in Paris. Haciane is an internationally established competitor. Previously, Haciane carried the flag for Andorra in the Opening Ceremony at the 2004 Summer Olympics in Athens, Greece. Haciane was the only Andorran to win a medal of any color in the pool.

Another athlete with great success in the pool was Icelandic swimmer Sigrun Bra Sverrisdottir. She had five medals in the freestyle: bronzes in the 100 m and 200 m, and golds in the 400 m, 800 m, and 4x100 m relay. The Icelandic swimmers had great success overall, winning 34 medals, twice the number of second place Cyprus. Unsurprisingly, they fared well in the swimming relays, being the only nation to win a medal in each of the six relay events. Cyprus won medals in five.

Cyprus continued its success in relays at the athletics events. Cypriots have won every women's 4x400 m held in competition, and also won their third straight men's 4x400 m. Cyprus also won the women's 4x100 m. Malta won the other relay, the men's 4x100 m, which Cyprus had won in the 2001 and 2003 Games.

Daniel Abenzoar-Foule of Luxembourg won the men's 100 m and 200 m, taking advantage of the retirement of Anninos Marcoullides. Marcoullides had won the double at the previous two Games and four times in total. Abenzoar finished second to Marcoullides in the 200 m at Malta in 2003.

Cypriot Eleni Artymata duplicated Abenzoar's feat on the women's side, winning the women's 100 m and 200 m. Artymata also duplicated the feat of countrywoman Marilia Gregoriou, who won the same double in 2003. Artymata tied Gregoriou's competition record in the women's 100 m with a time of 11.67 seconds. In the women's middle-distance events, fellow Cypriot Anna Christofidou pulled off a double of her own, winning the 800 m and 1500 m.

Several athletes defended their titles from the previous games. Among the most notable was Irini Charalambous, a female Cypriot jumper. Charalambous won her third consecutive long jump title, and her fourth in the last five Games. Cyprus also retained the women's triple jump when Maria Diikiti retained her title as well. Andorran distance runner Toni Bernardó repeated in the men's 5000 m, and Andorran middle-distance runner Victor Martínez won the 1500 m. Martínez won the 1500 m at the 1997, 1999, and 2001 Games.

Liechtenstein may have won the fewest medals at the 2005 Games, but had great success in the cycling events. Marc Ruhe won gold in the mountain course, while Dimitri Jiriakov finished first in the road course. Luxembourg also had success in cycling events. Luxembourgers won gold and silver in the cycling time trial, silver and bronze in the road race, and silver in the mountain race; all five Luxembourger cycling medals were won by different riders.

Cyprus won the gold medal in men's basketball with a win over Andorra, coming back from a significant deficit and winning the game on the strength of a seventeen-point fourth quarter advantage. Unlike many tournaments, though, the short duration of the Games of the Small States means that the tournament is purely in round-robin format, so Andorra did not win the silver medal. Iceland took the silver in men's basketball, and Luxembourg the bronze. Iceland also took the silver in women's basketball, while Luxembourg took the gold and Malta the bronze.

Iceland won three individual taekwondo events, and Cyprus won another three. These successes led the Icelanders to win the women's team medal and the Cypriots the men's. Also held in Escaldes-Engordany were the Judo events. Monaco had their best showing in Judo, winning three golds, a silver, and four bronzes. Iceland had similar success in Judo as in Taekwondo, and won four golds, continuing their success at the Prat Gran Pavilion.

In racquet sports, the Maltese fared well in men's table tennis. They took gold and silver in men's singles, and then the duo paired to win the doubles and lead Malta to the team medal. The Sammarinese and Luxembourgers split dominance for the women's events, each winning a gold, with San Marino taking the team title. Luxembourg made up for that, winning both women's tennis events and the men's doubles. Monaco took the men's singles gold.

Cyprus had a very successful Games and led the medal count again after leading it in Malta. Their success stretched across all disciplines, but they were especially successful in Athletics. Iceland finished second in the medal table; almost half of the Icelandic medals came in swimming events. Andorra had a large boost in successes from being the host nation and having more athletes participate; they had 11 more medals than in Malta in 2003.

== Medal count ==
* Host nation (Andorra)

Rank	Nation	Gold	Silver	Bronze	Total
1	Cyprus (CYP)	39	28	24	91
2	Iceland (ISL)	26	23	27	76
3	Luxembourg (LUX)	18	21	23	62
4	Monaco (MON)	11	8	18	37
5	Andorra (AND)*	8	14	9	31
6	Malta (MLT)	7	13	18	38
7	San Marino (SMR)	6	9	7	22
8	Liechtenstein (LIE)	5	5	3	13
Totals (8 entries)		120	121	129	370

== Venues ==
Fittingly, most of the events of the 2005 Games took place in Andorra la Vella itself. Swimming and volleyball were both held at the Serradells Pavilion. Basketball took place at the main sports complex in the city, Poliesportiu de Govern. Beach Volleyball was held in Parc Central, in the center of the city. All athletics events similarly took place in the similarly centrally located Estadi Comunal d'Andorra la Vella.

Road cycling events took place on the streets of Andorra la Vella. Mountain cycling events took place in the skiing resort town of Pal in the province of La Massana. Also taking place in that province were tennis events. Tennis was held indoors on hard courts at L'Aldosa Sport Complex in the town of La Massana.

Some shooting events took place at the La Rabassa range in Sant Julià de Lòria. Taekwondo and Judo events also took place outside of Andorra la Vella, at the Prat Gran Pavilion in Escaldes-Engordany. Lastly, table tennis took place at the Centre d'Encamp in Encamp.

Many of the venues used in the 2005 Games were also used in 1991, the last time Andorra hosted the event.

== See also ==
- Games of the Small States of Europe
- Andorra 2005 (archived)
