= 1991 Games of the Small States of Europe =

International multi-sport event

IV Games of the Small States of Europe IV Jocs dels Petits Estats d'Europa
- Country: Andorra
- Nations: 8
- Athletes: 697
- Events: 82 in 8 sports
- Opening: 21 May 1991
- Closing: 25 May 1991
- Opened by: Joan Martí i Alanis

The IV Games of the Small States of Europe were hosted by the Principality of Andorra and held from 21 to 25 May 1991.

== Competitions ==
- Athletics ()
- Basketball ()
- Cycling ()
- Judo ()
- Shooting ()
- Swimming ()
- Tennis ()
- Volleyball ()

== Medals count ==
Final Table:

* Host nation (Andorra)

| Rank | Nation | Gold | Silver | Bronze | Total |
|---|---|---|---|---|---|
| 1 | Iceland (ISL) | 27 | 19 | 18 | 64 |
| 2 | Luxembourg (LUX) | 23 | 22 | 15 | 60 |
| 3 | Cyprus (CYP) | 22 | 16 | 23 | 61 |
| 4 | Monaco (MON) | 8 | 13 | 14 | 35 |
| 5 | San Marino (SMR) | 1 | 2 | 5 | 8 |
| 6 | Malta (MLT) | 1 | 2 | 4 | 7 |
| 7 | Andorra (AND)* | 0 | 5 | 9 | 14 |
| 8 | Liechtenstein (LIE) | 0 | 3 | 3 | 6 |
| Totals (8 entries) | | 82 | 82 | 91 | 255 |
