= Karolina Fotiadou =

Cypriot alpine skier (born 1970)

Personal information
- Nationality: Cypriot
- Born: 10 August 1970 (age 56)

Sport
- Sport: Alpine skiing

Karolina Fotiadou (Greek: Καρολίνα Φωτιάδου; born 10 August 1970) is a Cypriot alpine skier. She competed at the 1988, 1992 and the 1994 Winter Olympics.
