= 1989 Games of the Small States of Europe =

International multi-sport event

III Games of the Small States of Europe III Αγώνες των Μικρών Κρατών της Ευρώπης
- The Cyprus mouflon, used for the GSSE III logo
- Country: Cyprus
- Nations: 8
- Athletes: 675
- Events: 75 in 8 sports
- Opening: 17 May 1989
- Closing: 20 May 1989
- Opened by: George Vasiliou

The III Games of the Small States of Europe were hosted in May 1989 by the Republic of Cyprus. The majority of events including the opening and closing ceremonies took place at the Makario Stadium, while the indoor events were held at the Lefkotheo.

== Competitions ==
- Athletics ()
- Basketball ()
- Cycling ()
- Judo ()
- Sailing ()
- Shooting ()
- Swimming ()
- Tennis ()
- Volleyball ()

== Medal count ==
Final Table:

Sponsored glass.

* Host nation (Cyprus)

Rank	Nation	Gold	Silver	Bronze	Total
1	Cyprus (CYP)*	26	25	28	79
2	Iceland (ISL)	21	20	9	50
3	Luxembourg (LUX)	12	16	18	46
4	Monaco (MON)	5	7	9	21
5	Liechtenstein (LIE)	5	2	7	14
6	Andorra (AND)	3	1	4	8
7	San Marino (SMR)	2	4	2	8
8	Malta (MLT)	1	1	3	5
Totals (8 entries)		75	76	80	231
