= 2001 Games of the Small States of Europe =

IX Games of the Small States of Europe IX Giochi dei piccoli stati d'Europa
- Country: San Marino
- Nations: 8
- Athletes: 658
- Events: 101 in 11 sports
- Opening: 28 May 2001
- Closing: 2 June 2001

The IX Games of the Small States of Europe were held from 28 May to 2 June 2001 in the Republic of San Marino.

== Competitions ==
Numbers in parentheses indicate the number of medal events contested in each sport.

- Athletics (31) ()
- Basketball ()
- Bocce ()
- Cycling ()
- Judo ()
- Shooting ()
- Swimming ()
- Synchronised swimming ()
- Table tennis ()
- Tennis ()
- Volleyball ()

== Medal count ==
* Host nation (San Marino)

Rank	Nation	Gold	Silver	Bronze	Total
1	Iceland (ISL)	31	18	16	65
2	Cyprus (CYP)	27	21	17	65
3	Luxembourg (LUX)	12	24	16	52
4	San Marino (SMR)*	12	8	16	36
5	Malta (MLT)	7	12	16	35
6	Monaco (MON)	5	8	14	27
7	Andorra (AND)	5	6	7	18
8	Liechtenstein (LIE)	2	2	2	6
Totals (8 entries)		101	99	104	304
