= Games of the Small States of Europe =

Multi-sport event

- Logo of the event
- Genre: Multi-sport competitions
- Location: International
- Inaugurated: 1985; 41 years ago
- Previous event: 2025
- Next event: 2027
- Organiser: European Olympic Committees
- Website: www.eocgsse.org

Member states in red, Vatican City in blue as unknown status, Faroe Islands in green as a prospective member

The Games of the Small States of Europe (GSSE) is a biennial multi-sport event, launched by the Republic of San Marino, organized by and featuring the National Olympic Committees of nine European small states since 1985. The Games are held at the end of May or beginning of June and feature competition in nine Summer Olympic sports.

== Member countries ==
The games are organized by the members of the European Olympic Committees (EOC). From its initial forming at the 1984 Olympics through 2009, there were eight members; the group's ninth member (Montenegro) was admitted in 2009. In order to be eligible, each member must have a population of less than one million people. Cyprus is the only exception (when counting the whole island (Note: The population of areas administered by the Republic of Cyprus is 923,272 according to the 2021 census.)); however, its population was below one million in 1984. The participating countries are:

- Andorra
- Cyprus
- Iceland
- Liechtenstein
- Luxembourg
- Malta
- Monaco
- Montenegro
- San Marino

The Faroe Islands are also seeking to compete at the Games; however, unlike the other participants, the Islands are neither an independent state (they are an autonomous part of Denmark) nor an EOC member.

== Editions ==
No.	Year	Host city	Host nation	Dates	Nations	Competitors	Sports	Events	Champions
1	1985	City of San Marino	San Marino	23–26 May	8	222	7	49	Iceland (ISL)
2	1987	Monaco City	Monaco	14–17 May	8	468	9	66	Iceland (ISL)
3	1989	Nicosia	Cyprus	17–20 May	8	675	8	75	Cyprus (CYP)
4	1991	Andorra la Vella	Andorra	21–25 May	8	697	8	82	Iceland (ISL)
5	1993	Various	Malta	25–29 May	8	690	8	87	Iceland (ISL)
6	1995	Luxembourg City	Luxembourg	29 May – 3 June	8	684	9	88	Iceland (ISL)
7	1997	Reykjavík	Iceland	2–7 June	8	714	10	87	Iceland (ISL)
8	1999	Vaduz	Liechtenstein	24–29 May	8	566	9	86	Iceland (ISL)
9	2001	City of San Marino	San Marino	29 May – 2 June	8	658	11	101	Iceland (ISL)
10	2003	Various	Malta	2–7 June	8	765	10	105	Cyprus (CYP)
11	2005	Andorra la Vella	Andorra	30 May – 4 June	8	793	11	120	Cyprus (CYP)
12	2007	Monaco City	Monaco	4–9 June	8	1,062	12	121	Cyprus (CYP)
13	2009	Various (Note: The majority of the events were hosted in Cyprus' capital city Nicosia, with other events taking place in Limassol and the National Park of Machairas.)	Cyprus	1–6 June	8	843	9	120	Cyprus (CYP)
14	2011	Various (Note: The Games were held in nine different municipalities of Liechtenstein.)	Liechtenstein	30 May – 4 June	9	750	9	113	Cyprus (CYP)
15	2013	Luxembourg City	Luxembourg	27 May – 1 June	9	762	12	120	Luxembourg (LUX)
16	2015	Reykjavík	Iceland	27 May – 1 June	9	789	11	120	Iceland (ISL)
17	2017	City of San Marino	San Marino	29 May – 3 June	9	889	11	131	Luxembourg (LUX)
18	2019	Budva	Montenegro	27 May – 1 June	9	846	10	113	Luxembourg (LUX)
~~19~~	~~2021~~	~~Andorra la Vella~~	~~Andorra~~	Cancelled due to the COVID-19 pandemic and to avoid conflict with the rescheduled 2020 Summer Olympics					
19	2023	Various	Malta	28 May – 3 June	9	835	10	125	Malta (MLT)
20	2025	Andorra la Vella	Andorra	26 May – 1 June	9	800+	12	160	Cyprus (CYP)
21	2027	Monaco City	Monaco	17–23 May	Future event				
22	2029	Luxembourg	Luxembourg	Future event					
23	2031	TBA	Cyprus	Future event					

== List of sporting disciplines ==
Some sports consist of multiple disciplines. Disciplines from the same sport are grouped under the same color:

Aquatics Basketball Cycling Gymnastics Volleyball
The 2021 Games were cancelled.

Sport (Discipline)	Body	85	87	89	91	93	95	97	99	01	03	05	07	09	11	13	15	17	19	21	23	25
Swimming (records)	LEN	•	•	•	•	•	•	•	•	•	•	•	•	•	•	•	•	•	•		•	•
Synchronized swimming	LEN									•												•
3x3 basketball	FIBAE																				•	
Basketball	FIBAE	•	•	•	•	•	•	•		•	•	•	•	•		•	•	•	•		•	•
Mountain biking	UEC													•	•	•		•			•	•
Road cycling	UEC	•	•	•	•	•	•	•	•	•		•			•	•		•			•	•
Artistic	UEG							•					•	•		•	•				•	•
Rhythmic	UEG													•								•
Beach volleyball	CEV												•	•	•	•	•	•	•		•	•
Volleyball	CEV		•	•	•	•	•	•	•	•		•	•	•	•	•	•	•	•		•	•
Archery	WAE																	•				
Athletics (records)	EAA	•	•	•	•	•	•	•	•	•	•	•	•	•	•	•	•	•	•		•	•
Boules	CMSB									•			•						•		•	
Golf	EGA																	•				
Judo	EJU	•	•	•	•	•	•	•	•	•	•	•	•	•	•	•	•	•	•		•	•
Karate	EKF																				•	•
Rugby sevens	RE																					•
Sailing	EUROSAF									•		•	•	•								•
Squash	ESF							•	•		•				•							
Shooting	ESF	•	•	•	•	•	•	•	•	•	•	•	•	•	•	•	•	•	•		•	•
Table tennis	ETTU						•	•	•	•	•	•	•	•	•	•	•	•	•		•	•
Taekwondo	ETU											•									•	
Tennis	TE		•	•	•	•	•	•	•	•	•	•	•	•	•	•	•	•	•		•	•
Weightlifting	EWF	•	•																			
Sport (Discipline)	Body	85	87	89	91	93	95	97	99	01	03	05	07	09	11	13	15	17	19	21	23	25

== All-time medal table ==
As of the 2025 Games of the Small States of Europe.

Rank	Nation	Gold	Silver	Bronze	Total
1	Cyprus (CYP)	555	483	440	1,478
2	Iceland (ISL)	535	415	449	1,399
3	Luxembourg (LUX)	443	447	425	1,315
4	Monaco (MON)	163	182	267	612
5	Malta (MLT)	124	198	250	572
6	Liechtenstein (LIE)	79	86	113	278
7	San Marino (SMR)	76	132	168	376
8	Montenegro (MNE)	67	37	57	161
9	Andorra (AND)	65	111	153	329
Totals (9 entries)		2,107	2,091	2,322	6,520

== See also ==
- Island Games
- Championships of the Small States of Europe
- European Volleyball Championship of the Small Countries Division
- FIBA European Championship for Small Countries
- FIBA Women's European Championship for Small Countries
- European Small Nations Karate Championships
- European Small Nations Weightlifting Championships
