= Cyprus Olympic Committee =

National Olympic Committee

- Country: Cyprus
- Code: CYP
- Created: 1974
- Recognized: 1978
- Continental Association: EOC
- Headquarters: Olympic House, Strovolos, Nicosia, Cyprus
- President: George Chrysostomou
- Secretary General: Andreas Georgiou
- Website: www.olympic.org.cy

The Cyprus Olympic Committee (COC; Greek: Κυπριακή Ολυμπιακή Επιτροπή; IOC Code: CYP) is National Olympic Committee representing the Republic of Cyprus. It is responsible for promoting the Olympic ideals on the island and for ensuring that Cyprus is represented with athletes at the Olympic Games and other multi-sport events.

Members of the committee are 31 sports federations, which elect the Executive Council composed of the president and twelve members.

The COC organized twice the Games of the Small States of Europe, in 1989 and in 2009.

== Mission and Games ==
The Cyprus Olympic Committee is responsible for safeguarding and implementing Olympism and the Olympic ideals in Cyprus. It's also responsible for supporting, entering and overseeing teams for the Olympic Games, European Games, Commonwealth Games, Mediterranean Games, Mediterranean Beach Games, Games of the Small States of Europe and other Junior-level multisport competitions such as the Youth Olympic Games, the Summer and Winter European Youth Olympic Festival and the Youth Commonwealth Games.

== History ==
The Cyprus Olympic Committee was founded on June 10, 1974, and became a member of the International Olympic Committee in 1979. Prior to that, Cypriot athletes competed in international events representing Greece. Amongst the most well known Cypriots who have represented Greece are Ioannis Frangoudis (triple shooting medalist in Athens 1896), Aristidis Konstantinidis (cycling gold medalist in Athens 1896), Stavros Tziortzis (7th in the 400m hurdles in Munich 1972) and Lakis Georgiou Psimolofitis (8th in skeet shooting in Munich 1972).

Cyprus’ first ever Olympic participation came in the Winter Games of 1980 at Lake Placid in United States, while the debut of Cyprus in the Summer Olympics came six months later in Moscow. Since then, Cyprus has been present at every Summer and Winter Olympic Games as well as other multisport events in continental and world level.

=== Landmark moments ===
The greatest accomplishment for Cyprus at the Olympics came in London 2012, when Laser sailor Pavlos Kontides won the silver medal, which is (as of 2017) the only Cypriot Olympic medal. Other successes for Cyprus at Olympic level were the 4th and 5th place by Antonis Nikolaidis and Georgios Achilleos respectively at the Beijing 2008 skeet shooting event, and the placing of six athletes (Kyriakos Ioannou, Pavlos Kontides, Milan Trajkovic, Apostolos Parellis, Dimitrios Chondrokoukis and Marios Georgiou) in their event finals in the Rio 2016 Games.

Cyprus' best placing in the Commonwealth Games came in 2010 at Delhi, India, when the island was 10th among 75 nations in the medal standings at the XIX Commonwealth Games.

The COC twice hosted the Games of the Small States of Europe, in compliance with the hosting rotation of the participant countries. The capital Nicosia hosted the III Games in 1989 while the event returned to the island in 2009 for the XIII Games with Nicosia and Limassol hosting events.

=== List of presidents ===
Since 1974, six individuals have served as President of the Cyprus Olympic Committee. The longest term was that of Kikis N. Lazarides who served as president between 1984 and 2008. The current president is George Chrysostomou who was elected in October 2020 for the Olympic Cycle 2020–2024.

President	Term
Stelios Garanis	1974–1976
Demetrakis Demetriades	1976–1984
Kikis N. Lazarides	1984–2008
Ouranios Ioannides	2008–2016
Dinos Michaelides	2016–2020
George Chrysostomou	2020–present

== Executive committee ==
Following the scheduled elections for the four-year circle until 2024, in October 2020, George Chrysostomou was elected president, after serving as vice-president in the previous four-year cycle.

Mr George Chrysostomou served as president of the Cyprus Basketball Federation between 2004 and 2014.

The 2020-2024 committee of the Cyprus NOC is represented by:

- President: George Chrysostomou
- Vice President: Yiotis Ioannides
- Secretary General: Andreas Georgiou
- Treasurer: Alexandros Christoforou
- Members: Andreas Theofylaktou, Sotos Trikomitis, Pavlos Georgiades, George Apostolou, Demetris Leontis, George Papageorgiou, Odysseas Patsalides.

== Member federations ==
The Cyprus National Federations are the organizations that coordinate all aspects of their individual sports. They are responsible for training, competition and development of their sports. There are currently 29 Olympic Summer and two Winter Sport Federations in Cyprus.

National Federation	Summer or Winter	Headquarters
Cyprus Archery Federation	Summer	Olympic House, Nicosia
Cyprus Athletics Federation	Summer	Olympic House, Nicosia
Cyprus Badminton Federation	Summer	Olympic House, Nicosia
Cyprus Basketball Federation	Summer	Olympic House, Nicosia
Cyprus Boxing Federation	Summer	Olympic House, Nicosia
Cyprus Canoe Federation	Summer	Olympic House, Nicosia
Cyprus Cycling Federation	Summer	Olympic House, Nicosia
Cyprus Equestrian Federation	Summer	Nicosia
Cyprus Fencing Federation	Summer	Olympic House, Nicosia
Cyprus Football Federation	Summer	Engomi, Nicosia
Cyprus Golf Federation	Summer	Olympic House, Nicosia
Cyprus Gymnastics Federation	Summer	Olympic House, Nicosia
Cyprus Handball Federation	Summer	Olympic House, Nicosia
Cyprus Hockey Federation	Summer	Nicosia
Cyprus Judo Federation	Summer	Olympic House, Nicosia
Cyprus Karate Federation	Summer	Olympic House, Nicosia
Cyprus Pentathlon Federation	Summer	Olympic House, Nicosia
Cyprus Rowing Federation	Summer	Limassol
Cyprus Rugby Federation	Summer	Olympic House, Nicosia
Cyprus Sailing Federation	Summer	Limassol
Cyprus Shooting Federation	Summer	Olympic House, Nicosia
Cyprus Skating Federation	Winter	Nicosia
Cyprus Ski Federation	Winter	Olympic House, Nicosia
Cyprus Swimming Federation	Summer	Olympic House, Nicosia
Cyprus Table Tennis Federation	Summer	Olympic House, Nicosia
Cyprus Taekwondo Federation	Summer	Olympic House, Nicosia
Cyprus Tennis Federation	Summer	Olympic House, Nicosia
Cyprus Triathlon Federation	Summer	Nicosia
Cyprus Volleyball Federation	Summer	Olympic House, Nicosia
Cyprus Weightlifting Federation	Summer	Olympic House, Nicosia
Cyprus Wrestling Federation	Summer	Olympic House, Nicosia

== Olympic House and Museum ==
The Olympic House, headquarters of the COC, opened on September 16, 2006, in a ceremony attended by the then President of the Republic of Cyprus Tassos Papadopoulos and president of the IOC Jacques Rogge. The three-story building houses almost every sporting federations of the island, including sports which aren't on the Olympic schedule. The Olympic House covers an area of 7500 m2 and cost 5,63 million Cyprus pounds. The Olympic House also houses the Cyprus Olympic Museum, which spans since 2012 on all three floors of the building. More than 400 artifacts are on display in the Olympic Museum, including the suit worn by Pavlos Kontides at London 2012, a medal won by Theofanis Theodotou in the Zappas Olympics in 1888 and sporting gear of the 1946 Boston Marathon winner Stylianos Kyriakides.

== Events and awards ==
In a way of implementing the beliefs and ideals of the Olympic Movement, the COC organizes events which inspire people and the younger generation. The special events vary from year to year and include multisport events as well as local and national events. These are the Olympic Day, Pierre de Coubertin student conference, National Olympic Academy conference, Olympic Education program, Woman in Sport conference, Award Banquets for the best junior athletes, and Fair Play ambassador appointment. The COC also organizes events which target to integrate and introduce sports to persons from sensitive groups such as refugees.

== Sponsors ==
The Cyprus Olympic Committee is supported by a number of sponsors, with the funds assisting the participation of the country in international events and for the organization of various non-sporting events.

OPAP Cyprus are the Long Time Sponsor. RCB Bank, Carbo One and Charalambides Christis are the Major Sponsor. CYTA, Toyota and Metro Supermarkets are the official sponsors.

== See also ==
- Cyprus at the Olympics
- Cyprus at the Paralympics
- Flag bearers for Cyprus at the Olympics
- Cyprus at the Commonwealth Games
- 1989 Games of the Small States of Europe
- 2009 Games of the Small States of Europe
